= List of University of Manitoba alumni =

This list of University of Manitoba alumni includes notable graduates, non-graduates, and current students of the University of Manitoba.

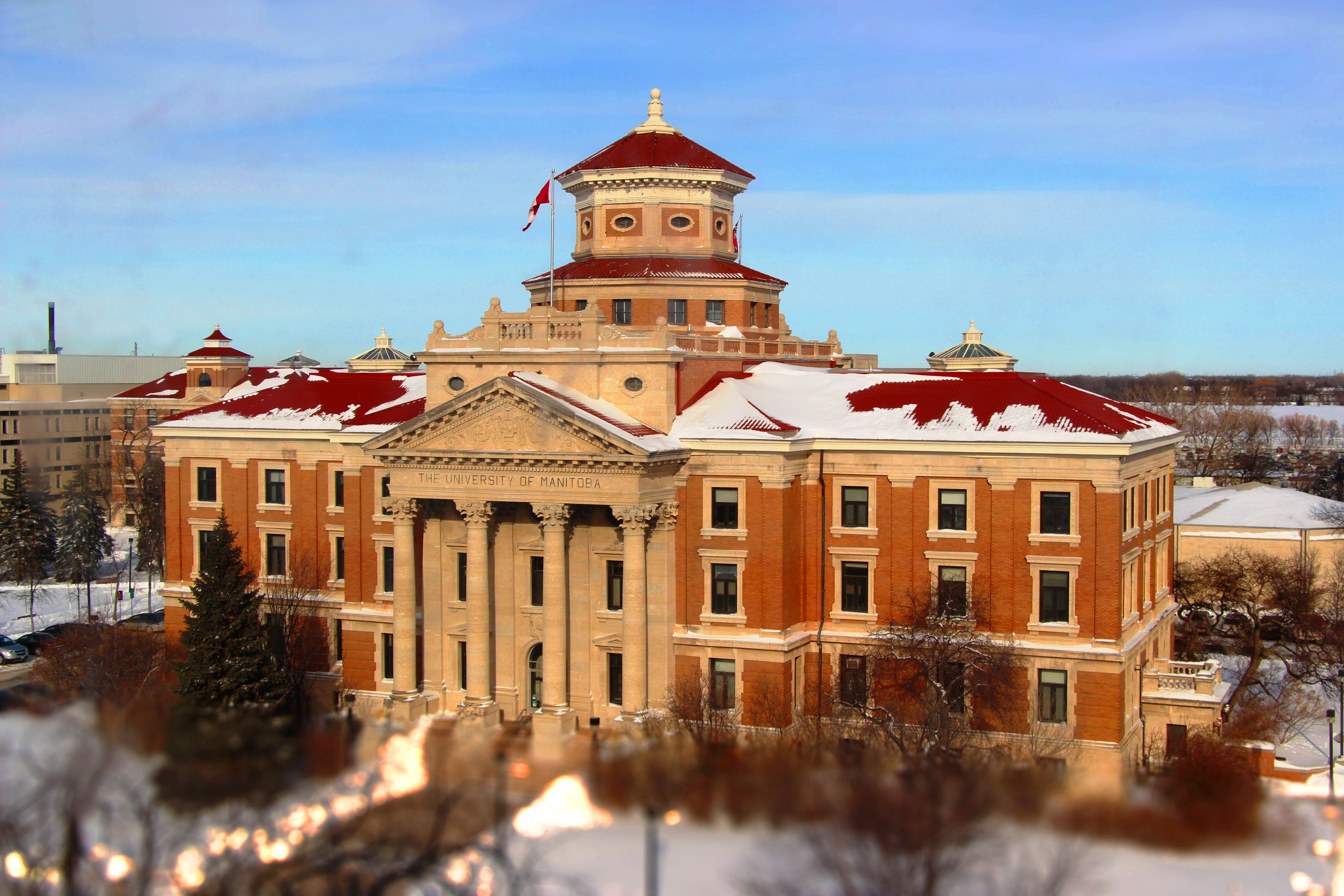
University of Manitoba Administration Building

== List ==
Alumni of the University of Manitoba

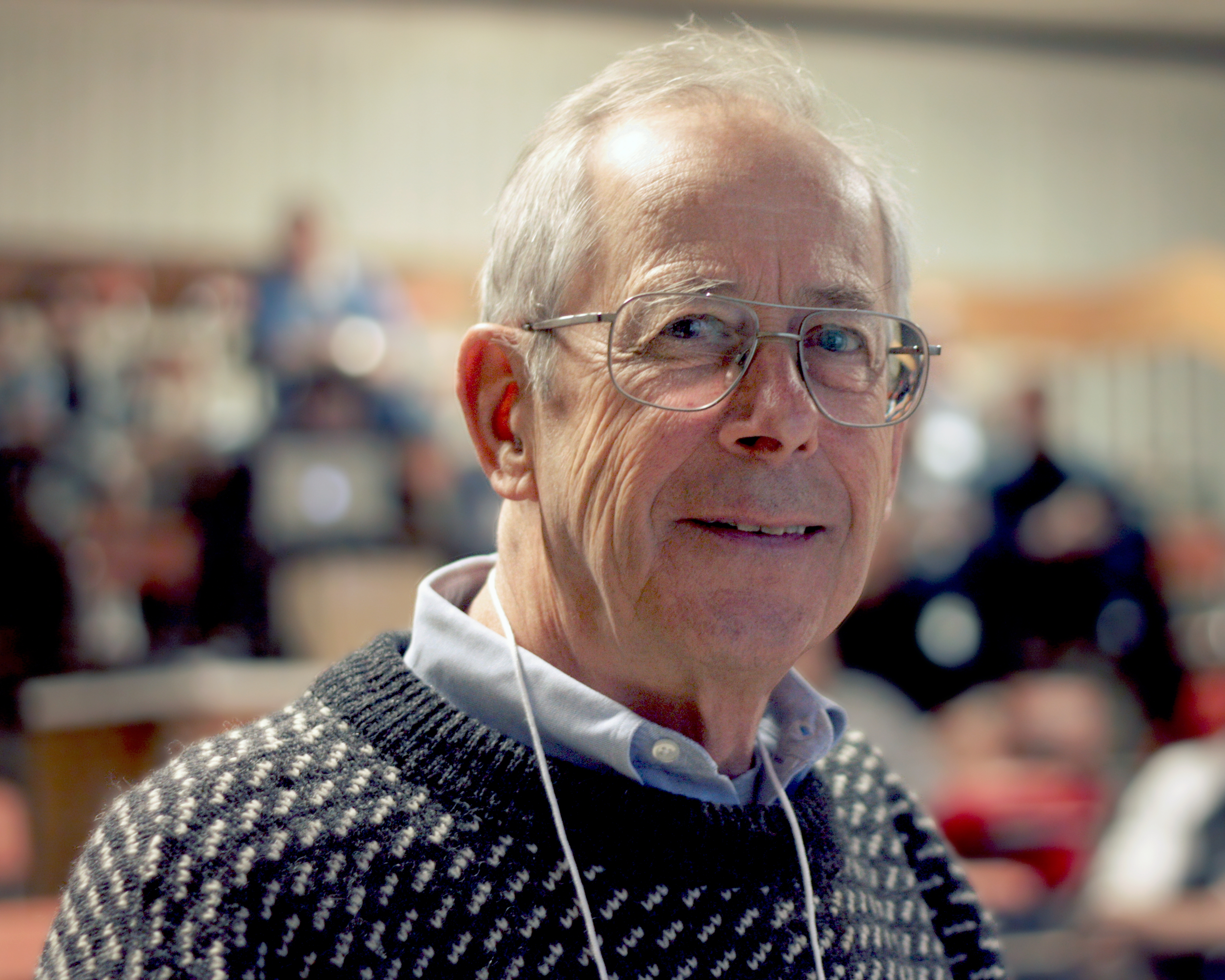
Jim Peebles, BSc 1958, Nobel Prize in Physics

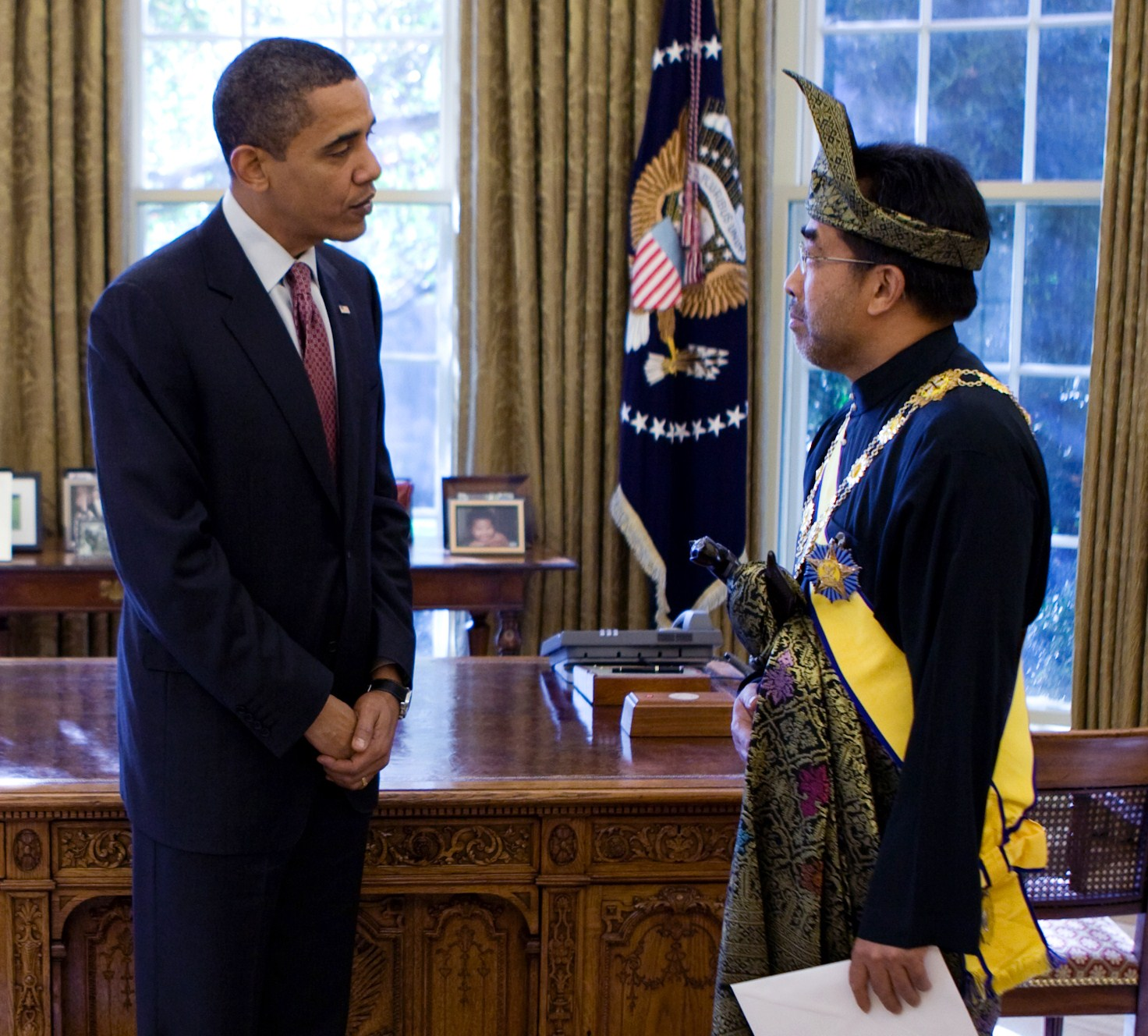
Jamaluddin Jarjis, MSc 1977, Malaysian politician

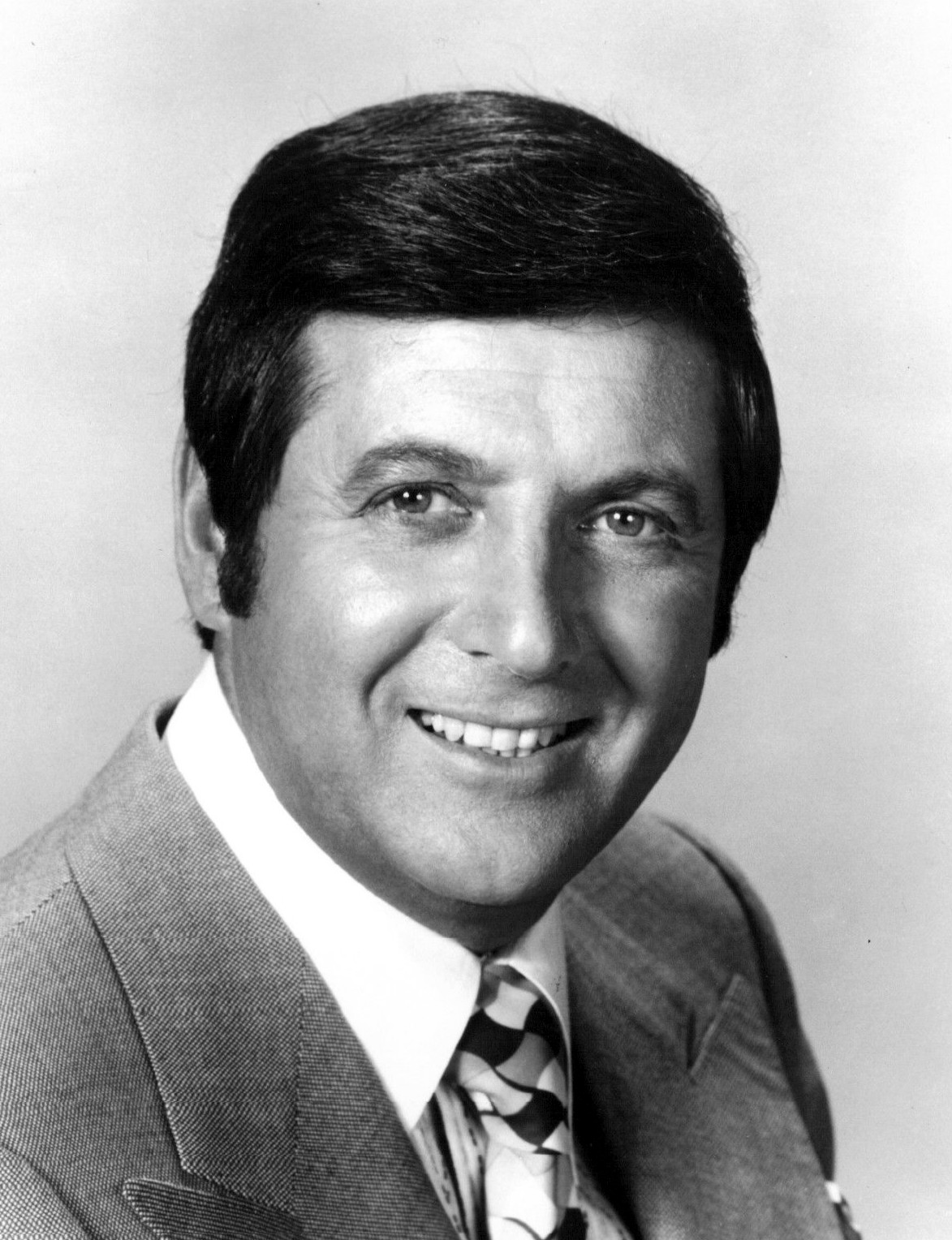
Monty Hall, BSc 1945, host of game show Let's Make a Deal

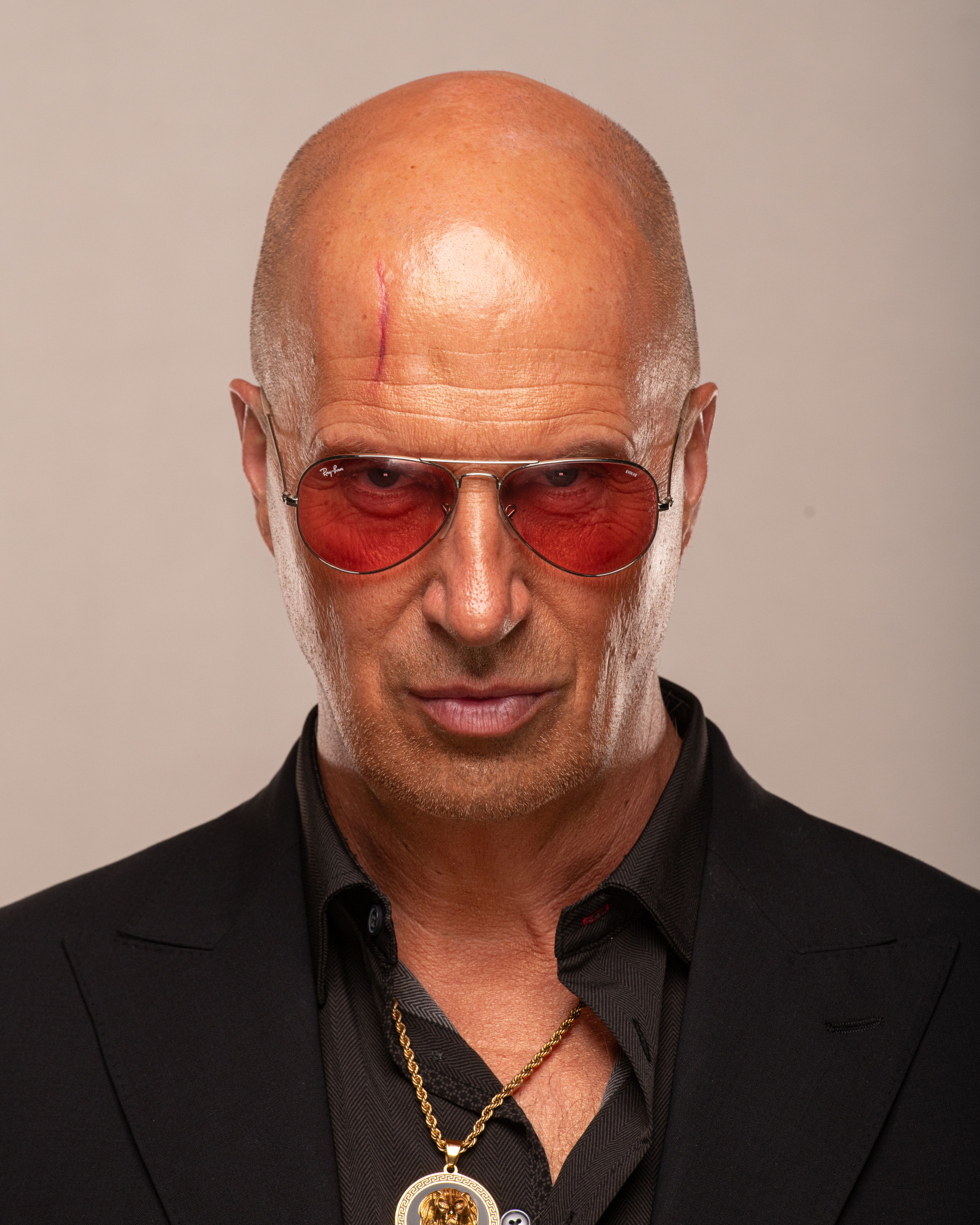
Don Callis, BA 1991, MBA 2003, professional wrestling manager formerly signed to WWE and currently signed to AEW

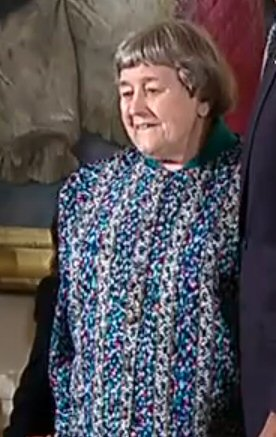
Yvonne Brill, BS 1945, engineer for NASA and the International Maritime Satellite Organization

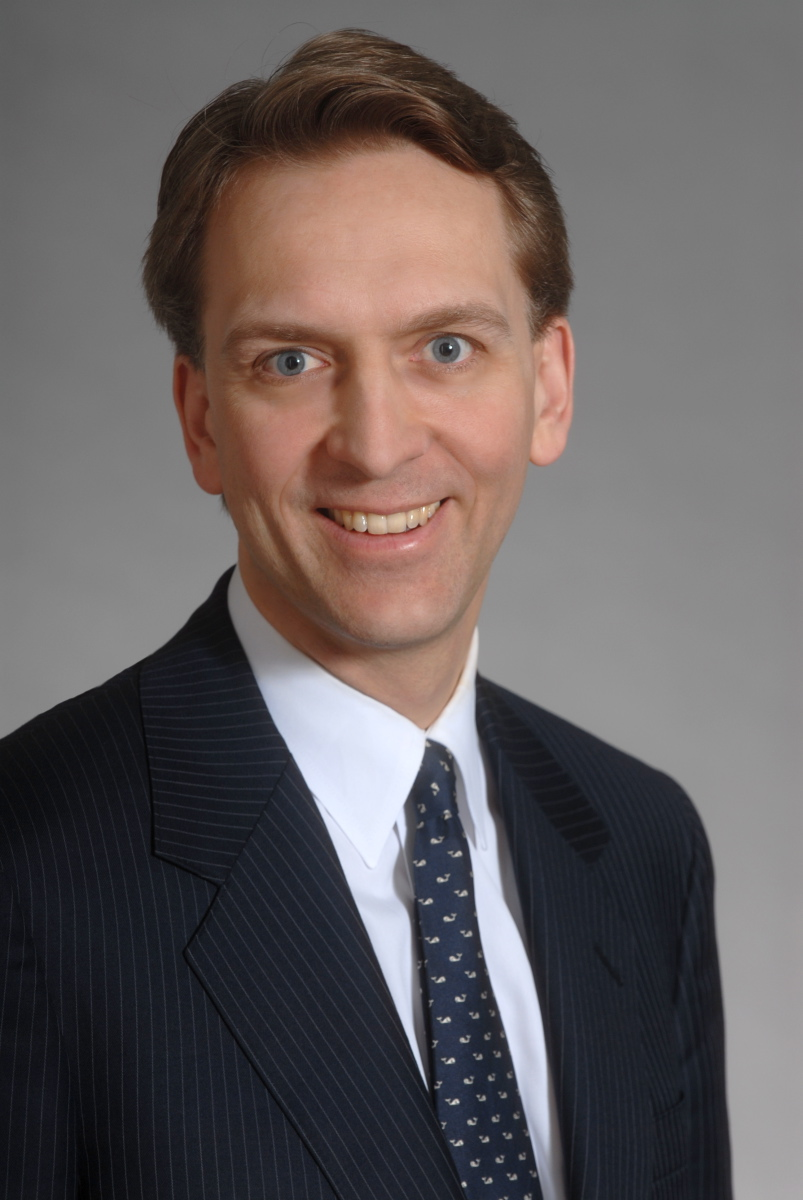
Bruce Flatt, BComm 1987, CEO of Brookfield Asset Management

| Name | Occupation / known for | UM credentials / activities | Additional details |
|---|---|---|---|
| Douglas Abra | judge | BA (1968); LL.B (1972) | |
| Samuel Hunter Adams | lawyer and 21st mayor of Calgary | BA (1906) | |
| Tracie O. Afifi | research scientist | BSc (1999); MSc (2003), PhD (2009) | |
| Judie Alimonti | immunologist and research scientist | PhD | |
| Peter Allen | composer | BMus (1975) | |
| Rob Altemeyer | politician | BA | |
| Nancy Ames | scientist | BSc (1980); BSc (1982) | |
| Victor Anonsen | footballer and artist | BA (1977) | |
| Frank Aquila | judge | LL.B (1982) | |
| Germaine Arnaktauyok | printmaker, painter and illustrator | BFA (1968) | |
| Niki Ashton | politician | BA | |
| Gordon J. G. Asmundson | psychologist and professor | MA; PhD (1991) | |
| David Asper | lawyer and businessman; son of Izzy Asper | BA (1981) | |
| Gail Asper | lawyer; daughter of Izzy Asper | BA (1981); LL.B.(1984) | |
| Izzy Asper | tax lawyer and media magnate of CanWest Global Communications Corp. | BA (1953); LLB (1957); LLM (1964) | In 2000, the university's Faculty of Management was re-named to the Asper School of Business in his honour. |
| Robert Astley | actuary | BSc | |
| Ken Attafuah | criminologist | BA (1982) | |
| Nahlah Ayed | reporter | BSc; MSc | |
| George Ayittey | economist and president of the Free Africa Foundation | PhD | |
| Tim Ball | public speaker and professor | MA | |
| G. Michael Bancroft | chemist and synchrotron scientist; first director of the Canadian Light Source | MSc (1964) | |
| David G. Barber | environmental scientist | BSc (1981); MSc (1987) | |
| Kathy Bardswick | president and CEO of The Co-operators | BS | |
| Lindon W. Barrett | cultural theorist | BA (1983) | |
| Robert Beamish | cardiologist | MD (1942) | |
| William Moore Benidickson | former member of Parliament, federal cabinet minister, and senator | | |
| George Montegu Black II | businessman, father of Conrad Black | | |
| Andy Blair | National Hockey League player in the 1920s and 1930s, mostly with the Toronto Maple Leafs | | |
| Richard Spink Bowles | lawyer and former Manitoba lieutenant-governor | BA (1933); LLB (1937) | |
| Yvonne Brill | rocket and jet propulsion engineer who invented the fuel-efficient rocket thruster that keeps satellites in orbit today | BS (1945) | The Yvonne C. Brill Lectureship in Aerospace Engineering of the American Institute of Aeronautics and Astronautics (AIAA) is named in her honour and presented annually. |
| Harold J Brodie | mycologist | BSc (1929) | |
| Harold Buchwald | lawyer | BA (1948); LL.B (1952); LL.M (1957) | |
| Wilfred Buck | scientific facilitator and Indigenous star lore expert | B.Ed. | |
| Don Callis | professional wrestler, MHSAA Darts finalist (1978) | BA (1991); MBA (2003) | |
| Norman Cantor | medieval scholar and writer | BA (1951) | |
| Albert Chan | Hong Kong politician and lawmaker | BA; BSW | |
| Richard Condie | Academy Award-nominated animator; creator of The Big Snit | BA (1967) | |
| Constantine of Irinoupolis | American Orthodox hierarch, primate of the Ukrainian Orthodox Church of the USA | St. Andrew's College graduate (1959) | |
| Meaghan DeWarrenne-Waller | fashion model; winner of Canada's Next Top Model, Cycle 3 | | |
| Brian Dickson | former chief justice of Canada | LL.B (1938) | |
| Gerry Ducharme | politician and cabinet minister in the 1988–1995 Progressive Conservative government | | |
| Mary Dunn | president of the Dominion Women's Amateur Hockey Association and the Manitoba branch of the Women's Amateur Athletic Federation of Canada | BS (1938) | |
| Audrey Dwyer | actor and writer | | |
| Marcel Dzama | artist | BFA (1997) | |
| Ed Evanko | actor and singer | BA | |
| Gordon S. Fahrni | Canada’s longest-lived physician (108 years old) | MD (1911) | |
| Faouzia | singer-songwriter | | |
| Fernanda Ferreira | cognitive psychologist | BA in Psychology (1982) | |
| Gary Filmon | premier of Manitoba (1988–1999) | BSc Civil Engineering | |
| Danny Finkleman | former CBC Radio host | LL.B | |
| Bruce Flatt | CEO of Brookfield Asset Management and billionaire ranked by Forbes magazine | BComm | |
| Steven Fletcher | politician; former Conservative MP in the House of Commons; former federal cabinet minister | BSc geological engineering; MBA at Asper | |
| Nahanni Fontaine | politician | MA | |
| Phil Fontaine | Indigenous Canadian leader | BA (1981) | |
| Waldron Fox-Decent | mediator, professor, Crown Corporation chairman | BA (1959); MA (1971) | |
| Eira Friesen | advocate for women in Winnipeg | BSc (1939) | |
| Patrick Friesen | poet, playwright, essayist | | |
| Donna Giberson | Entomologist | PhD | |
| Erving Goffman | sociologist who introduced the concept of dramaturgy into the field | BSc | |
| Jyoti Gondek | mayor of Calgary | | |
| Audrey Gordon | politician, former minister of Health and Seniors Care in Manitoba | BA; MBA | |
| Velvl Greene | scientist and academic | BS in agriculture; MS dairy bacteriology | |
| Monty Hall | television personality | BSc | Hall was also president of Variety Clubs International and received the Order of Canada. |
| Ellie Harvie | actress | BA | |
| S.I. Hayakawa | scholar and professor of semantics; United States senator | BA (1927) | |
| John Alexander Hopps | inventor of the world's first artificial pacemaker; known as the "father of biomedical engineering in Canada" | BEng (1941) | |
| Gad Horowitz | political scientist who coined the term "Red Tory" | BA | |
| Barbara Humphreys | architect and author, specializing in public service, historic preservation, and housing | B.Arch. (1941) | |
| Johanna Hurme | architect and activist | BEnvD (1996); MArch | |
| Israel Idonije | retired NFL defensive end | | |
| Jamaluddin Jarjis | former Malaysian ambassador to the United States; former Malaysian government minister | MSc | |
| Francis Lawrence Jobin | former lieutenant-governor of Manitoba | | |
| F. Ross Johnson | businessman; CEO of RJR Nabisco | BComm (1952) | |
| Tanya Kappo | lawyer and Indigenous rights activist | JD (2012) | |
| Sam Katz | mayor of Winnipeg (2004–2014) | BA (1973) | |
| Guy Gavriel Kay | novelist and poet | BA (1975) | |
| Humayun Akhtar Khan | politician | MS | |
| David Kilgour | former federal minister of Transport | BA | |
| Wab Kinew | premier of Manitoba (2023–present) | BA | |
| Greg Kopp | acting dean of Engineering at the University of Western Ontario | BSc (1989) | |
| Scott Koskie | former member of the Canada men's national volleyball team | BRMCD (1995) | |
| Roman Kroitor | co-founder of IMAX Corporation | MA (1951) | |
| Amanda Lang | journalist; senior business correspondent for CBC News | | |
| Allan Levine | author, known mainly for his award-winning non-fiction and historical mystery writing | BA (1978) | |
| Bob Lowes | ice hockey coach and executive | | |
| James Lunney | politician; former Conservative member of Parliament for the riding of Nanaimo—Alberni in BC | | |
| Inky Mark | former federal Conservative member of Parliament for Dauphin—Swan River, Manitoba | | |
| Bill Mason | author, filmmaker, environmentalist | | |
| Pearl McGonigal | former lieutenant-governor of Manitoba | | |
| William John McKeag | former lieutenant-governor of Manitoba | | |
| Marshall McLuhan | famed media scholar | | |
| Harry Medovy | pediatrician and academic | | |
| Ovide Mercredi | Aboriginal Canadian leader | LLB (1977) | |
| Ted Milian | Canadian football player | | |
| W.O. Mitchell | writer | | |
| W. L. Morton | historian | | |
| Arnold Naimark | physician, academic, and former president of the U of M | | |
| Alison Norlen | artist | | |
| William Norrie | mayor of Winnipeg (1979–1992) | BA (1950); LLB (1955) | |
| Gordon Orlikow | decathlon, heptathlon, and hurdles competitor, Athletics Canada chairman, Canadian Olympic Committee member, Korn/Ferry International partner; competed for the Manitoba Bisons in track and field; honoured on the Bisons Walkway of Honour | | |
| Rey Pagtakhan | physician, academic, former MP and federal cabinet minister | | |
| Malcolm Peat | emeritus professor at Queen's University | | Member of the Order of the British Empire (MBE) |
| Jim Peebles | astrophysicist | | won the Crafoord Prize (2005), Nobel Prize in Physics (2019), Companion of the Order of Canada, Order of Merit (CC, OM, 2020) |
| Leonard Peikoff | philosopher | | |
| Frank Pickersgill | Special Operations Executive agent in World War II, executed by the Nazis | | |
| Barry Posner | physician and research scientist on diabetes | | |
| Jon Pylypchuk | artist | | |
| Clay Riddell | oil tycoon; founder, president and CEO of Paramount Resources, based in Calgary | BSc Honours (1959) | The university's Clayton H. Riddell Faculty of Environment, Earth, and Resources is named in his honour. |
| Claude C. Robinson | ice hockey and sports executive | 1902 | inducted into the Hockey Hall of Fame and Canadian Olympic Hall of Fame |
| Dufferin Roblin | former premier of Manitoba | | |
| Marshall Rothstein | Supreme Court of Canada judge | | |
| Alexei Maxim Russell | internationally-published novelist | | |
| Fred Sandhu | Provincial Court of Manitoba judge | | |
| Edward Schreyer | premier of Manitoba (1969–1977) and governor general of Canada (1979–1984) | | |
| Cynthia Scott | Oscar-winning filmmaker | BA | |
| Richard Scott | former chief justice of Manitoba Court of Appeal | | |
| Harry Seidler | Australian architect | | |
| Mohamed Ali Al-Shaaban | television personality and surgeon | BSc (2006) | |
| Mitchell Sharp | former Liberal minister of Finance | | |
| Patricia Alice Shaw | linguist specializing in phonology and known for her work on First Nations languages | | |
| Louis Slotin | physicist and chemist who took part in the Manhattan Project | BSc (1932); MSc (1933) | |
| Robert Steen | mayor of Winnipeg (1977–1979) | | |
| Mary Ann Steggles | Commonwealth scholar and international expert on British colonial statuary | | Olive Beatrice Stanton recipient |
| Iain Stewart | theoretical physicist | | |
| Olawale Sulaiman | neurosurgeon and academic | | |
| William Sweet | philosopher and professor at St, Francis Xavier University | MA (1979) | Fellow of the Royal Society of Canada (FRSC) |
| Frank Trafford Taylor | lawyer and former president of Kiwanis International | | |
| John W.M. Thompson | Manitoba MLA and provincial cabinet minister | | |
| Grace Eiko Thomson | curator, activist, and internment camp survivor | BFA (1977) | |
| Thorbergur Thorvaldson | cement chemist | | |
| Miriam Toews | novelist | | |
| Vic Toews | politician; former minister of justice and attorney general and the president of the Treasury Board in the cabinet of Prime Minister Stephen Harper | | |
| Andrew Unger | satirist and novelist | BA (2002); BEd. (2004) | |
| Chris Urmson | CEO of Aurora Innovation | BSc (1998) | |
| Adele Wiseman | author | | |
| Svetlana Zylin | playwright and director | | |
