= College of Physicians and Surgeons of British Columbia =

Canadian regulatory college

- Formation: 1886; 140 years ago
- Headquarters: Vancouver, British Columbia
- Region served: British Columbia
- President: Anne Priestman
- Registrar and CEO: Patrick Rowe
- Vice-President: Tarjeet Mann
- Treasurer: Chantal Leger
- Website: www.cpsbc.ca

The College of Physicians and Surgeons of British Columbia is a regulatory college which regulates the practice of medicine in British Columbia. The primary function of the college is to ensure that physicians are qualified, competent and fit to practise medicine. The college administers processes for responding to complaints from patients and for taking action if a physician is practising in a manner that is incompetent, unethical or illegal.

All physicians who practise medicine in British Columbia must be registered with the college.

The college also administers quality assurance and accreditation programs to ensure that every physician in the province is practising according to professional standards and that all of BC's diagnostic and private medical and surgical facilities are accredited.

== Mandate ==
The College of Physicians and Surgeons of British Columbia regulates the practice of medicine under the authority of provincial law. All physicians who practise medicine in the province must be registrants of the college. The college's overriding interest is the protection and safety of patients. The role of the college is to ensure physicians meet expected standards of practice and conduct. "A practice standard reflects the minimum standard of professional behaviour and ethical conduct on a specific topic or issue expected by the College of all physicians in British Columbia", and the body of standards itself is strongly influenced by national edicts, such as the CMA Code of Ethics and Professionalism, and the Tri-Council Policy Statement: Ethical Conduct for Research Involving Humans.

Regulation of the medical profession is based on the foundation that the college must act first and foremost in the interest of the public. The primary function of the college is to ensure that physicians are qualified, competent and fit to practise medicine. The college administers processes for responding to complaints from patients and for taking action if a physician is practising in a manner that is incompetent, unethical or illegal. The college also administers a number of quality assurance activities to ensure physicians remain competent throughout their professional lives.

=== COVID-19 ===
During the COVID-19 pandemic in British Columbia, the college provided guidance for doctors to respond to the crisis in a uniform manner. On March 16, 2020, the college suspended evaluations for the Non-Hospital Medical and Surgical Facilities Accreditation Program (NHMSFAP) and Diagnostic Accreditation Program (DAP).

== Governance structure ==
The role of the college and its authority and powers are set out in the Health Professions Act, RSBC 1996, c.183, the Regulations and the Bylaws made under the Act. A Board of 10 peer-elected physicians and five members of the public appointed by the Ministry of Health (British Columbia) govern the college.

=== Board of directors ===
The Board of Directors as of February 2024 consists of:

- Anne Priestman, President - District 4, Fraser
- Tarjeet Mann, Vice-president - Victoria
- Chantal Leger, Treasurer - District 3, Vancouver and surrounding area
- Jason Wale - District 1, Vancouver Island South
- Justin Kingsley - District 2, Vancouver Island Central and Northern
- Ron Abrahams - District 3, Vancouver and surrounding area
- Christopher Nguan - District 3, Vancouver and surrounding area
- Shauna Tsuchiya - District 5, Thompson-Okanagan
- Anneline Du Preez - District 6, Kootenays
- Karen Seland - District 7, Northern
- Shannon McDonald - Victoria
- Jane Dyson - Vancouver
- Margo Greenwood - Prince George
- Haike Muller - Kamloops
- Shirley Ross - Vancouver
- Lionel Yip - Vancouver

Under the legislation, the college has 14 committees made up of board members, medical professionals and public representatives who review issues and provide guidance and direction to the Board and the college staff. The daily operations of the college are administered by the registrar (CEO) and other medical and professional staff.

=== Affiliations ===
While the college often collaborates with stakeholders and partners in the public interest, the college is an independent body, separate from government and other organizations, such as Doctors of BC (formerly BCMA).

The college participates as a member in various national and international regulatory associations including the Federation of Medical Regulatory Authorities of Canada (FMRAC) and the International Association of Medical Regulatory Authorities (IAMRA). It is also a member of the Coalition for Physician Enhancement, a continuing medical education initiative based in Kentucky.

== See also ==
- Ministry of Health (British Columbia)
- Royal College of Physicians and Surgeons of Canada
- College of Family Physicians of Canada
- Canadian Medical Association
- Medical Council of Canada
- Medical Services Plan of British Columbia
- Doctors of BC
- British Columbia Medical Journal
- HealthLinkBC
