= Asmundson =

Asmundson is a surname. Notable people with the surname include:

- Freeman Asmundson (born 1943), retired Canadian professional ice hockey player
- Gordon J. G. Asmundson, Canadian psychologist
- Ossie Asmundson (1908–1964), professional ice hockey right winger
- Ruthlane Uy Asmundson, political moderate currently serving as Mayor of the City of Davis, California, USA
