= Norlén =

Norlén or Norlen is a Swedish surname. Notable people with the surname include:

- Alison Norlen (born 1962), Canadian artist
- Andreas Norlén (born 1973), Swedish politician
- Göran Norlén (1931–2020), Swedish speedway rider
- Henrik Norlén (born 1970), Swedish actor
- Johan Norlén (born 1971), Swedish officer
