= Jody Toor =

Canadian politician

Jody Toor MLA

Member of the British Columbia Legislative Assembly for Langley-Willowbrook
- Incumbent
- Assumed office October 19, 2024
- Preceded by: Andrew Mercier

Parliamentary Secretary of Tourism
- Incumbent
- Assumed office November 20, 2026
- Preceded by: Office Established

Personal details
- Party: BC Conservative

Jody Toor MLA is a Canadian politician who has served as a member of the Legislative Assembly of British Columbia (MLA) representing the electoral district of Langley-Willowbrook since the 2024 British Columbia election. She is a member of the British Columbia Conservative Party.

== Early life and career ==
Toor was born and raised in the city of Langley. She is a mother of two daughters, and wife to Dr. Charn Toor who runs an optometry clinic in Walnut Grove.

Toor is a holistic health practitioner and runs her own integrative holistic clinic in Langley. According to ConsciousMind Labs, on whose executive board she sits, Toor holds a double PhD in Doctor of Integrative Medicine and Doctor of Humanitarian Services with the Board Of Integrative Medicine from Quantum University in Hawaii. Quantum University is unaccredited and online, and has a disclaimer that notes that its degrees are not equivalent to Doctor of Medicine or Doctor of Naturopathic Medicine degrees. On the British Columbia Conservative Party's biographical page for Toor, it is noted that she is non-prescribing and not registered with the College of Physicians and Surgeons of BC.

Toor is a breast cancer survivor and cites this experience as motivating and deepening her commitment to advocating for healthcare policies that prioritize prevention, early detection, and a holistic approach to wellness.

She also volunteers as a community worker with her local food bank and charity groups.

== Political career ==
In the 2022 British Columbia municipal elections, Toor unsuccessfully ran for a council seat in Surrey on Jinny Sims's Surrey Forward slate.

On June 18, 2024, Toor was nominated by the British Columbia Conservative Party as their candidate for Langley-Willowbrook. She went on to win a seat in the Legislative Assembly of BC during the 2024 provincial election, defeating NDP incumbent Andrew Mercier by 867 votes

She currently serves as caucus chair for the British Columbia Conservative Party's caucus. On March 11, 2025, her private member's bill, the Perinatal and Postnatal Mental Health Strategy Act (Bill M 204), became the first private member's bill in 43 years to pass second reading with unanimous support in a recorded vote. The bill was aimed at integrating perinatal and postnatal mental health care into the provincial healthcare system to ensure that critical resources during and post-pregnancy were accessible to mothers and their families. 91 of 93 MLAs were present in the house and it passed unanimously.

== Political controversies ==
During the 2024 provincial election, NDP Health Minister Adrian Dix criticized Toor's use of the title doctor despite not being a medical doctor and not being part of the College of Physicians and Surgeons of British Columbia. Her campaign website consistently noted these facts, though earlier versions of her website referred to Toor as "Dr. Jody Toor" and "Dr. Toor". On October 16, 2024, the Hospital Employees' Union filed a complaint with the College of Complementary Health Professionals of BC to investigate her alleged use of the doctor title.

== Electoral record ==
2026 British Columbia general election: Langley-Willowbrook
Party	Candidate	Votes	%	±%	Expenditures
Conservative	Jody Toor	10,720	52.30		
New Democratic	Andrew Mercier	7,400	36.10		
Green	Anisha Sandhu	1,580	7.71		
OneBC	Shubham Joshi	755	3.68	—	
Total valid votes		20,455	99.79		
Total rejected ballots		43	0.21		
Turnout		20,498			
Registered voters					
Conservative hold		Swing		+6.36	
Source: Elections BC

2024 British Columbia general election: Langley-Willowbrook
Party	Candidate	Votes	%	±%	Expenditures
Conservative	Jody Toor	10,979	48.24	+40.4	$65,269.39
New Democratic	Andrew Mercier	10,112	44.43	-5.0	$52,816.43
Green	Petrina Arnason	1,670	7.34	-3.1	$1,993.47
Total valid votes/expense limit		22,761	99.92	–	$71,700.08
Total rejected ballots		18	0.08	–	
Turnout		22,779	55.44	–	
Registered voters		41,088			
Conservative notional gain from New Democratic		Swing		+22.7	
Source: Elections BC

== See also ==
- 43rd Parliament of British Columbia
