= Barry Posner =

Barry Posner may refer to:

- Barry Posner (physician) (born 1937), Canadian physician and research scientist
- Barry Posner (leadership scholar) (born 1949), American leadership academic
