= Dan Peterson (politician) =

Canadian politician (1940–2025)

Member of the British Columbia Legislative Assembly for Langley
- In office October 22, 1986 – September 20, 1991 Serving with Carol Gran
- Preceded by: Bob McClelland
- Succeeded by: Lynn Stephens

Personal details
- Born: Dan George Peterson; August 31, 1940; Edmonton, Alberta
- Died: July 8, 2025 (aged 84); Abbotsford, British Columbia
- Political party: Social Credit

Daniel George Peterson (August 31, 1940 – July 8, 2025) was a Canadian politician who served as a member of the Legislative Assembly of British Columbia (MLA) from 1986 to 1991, serving alongside Carol Gran in the riding of Langley. A member of the Social Credit Party, he was defeated in the 1991 general election when he sought a second term in the riding of Fort Langley-Aldergrove.
