= Hunter Vogel =

Canadian politician

Member of the Legislative Assembly of British Columbia
- In office September 30, 1963 – August 30, 1972 Serving with Ernest LeCours (1963–1966)
- Preceded by: New riding
- Succeeded by: Robert Howard McClelland
- Constituency: Delta (1963–1966); Langley (1966–1972)

Mayor of the City of Langley
- In office March 15, 1955 – May 29, 1955
- Succeeded by: Ernest Edward Sendell

Personal details
- Born: August 4, 1903 Vancouver, British Columbia
- Died: April 25, 1990 (aged 86) Langley, British Columbia
- Party: Social Credit
- Spouse: Margaret Isabel Gunn
- Children: 3 (including William)

Hunter Bertram August Vogel (August 4, 1903 – April 25, 1990) was a Canadian politician. He served in the British Columbia Legislative Assembly from 1963 to 1972, as a Social Credit member for the constituency of Delta (1963-1966), and then Langley (1966-1972).

Vogel was born to Hans Broder Anton Vogel, a German (Danish?) immigrant, and Anne Georgia Hunter, originally from Canada. He completed a business course from the University of Toronto via correspondence. In 1929, he married Margaret Isabel Gunn.

Vogel was the first mayor of the City of Langley, serving from March 15, 1955 to May 29, 1955.

Son William (Bill) (born 1931) was a mayor of Surrey. Sons Richard (Dick) Vogel and Walter (Wink), born 1934) also founded Mushroom Records in 1974.

In 1946, Vogel purchased a paint company, Cloverdale Paint. When he was elected to the legislature, he turned over the leadership of Cloverdale Paint to his son, Walter (Wink). By 2005, Cloverdale Paint had 65 franchises across Canada.

Hunter Vogel died of respiratory failure from chronic obstructive pulmonary disease in 1990, aged 86.
