= Ed McKitka =

Canadian politician (1934–2014)

Mayor of Surrey, British Columbia
- In office 1975–1977
- Preceded by: Bill Vander Zalm
- Succeeded by: Bill Vogel

Personal details
- Born: Adolf Mikitka; March 15, 1934 Vilna, Alberta
- Died: February 4, 2014 (aged 79) Chilliwack, British Columbia

Edward Adolph McKitka (born Adolf Mikitka; March 15, 1934 – February 4, 2014) was a Canadian politician who served as the Mayor of Surrey, British Columbia for one term from 1975 until 1977.

McKitka was first elected as a Surrey city alderman in 1968. He was elected Mayor of Surrey, British Columbia's second largest city, in 1975, serving a single term in office from 1975 to 1977. In November 1977, McKitka was defeated for re-election by Bill Vogel in the Surrey mayoral election.

McKitka left office under a police investigation for misuse of office. He was convicted of breach of trust committed during his mayoral tenure and served time in prison. In 1979, McKitka returned to politics when he was re-elected as a Surrey alderman for a one-year term.

Ed McKitka died from injuries sustained in a one vehicle accident in Chilliwack, British Columbia, on February 4, 2014, at the age of 79. He had been driving his truck near the Vedder River Bridge at the time of the accident. Bob Bose, who also served as Mayor from 1988 to 1996, praised McKitka saying, "He was one of the most charismatic persons I've ever known. Incorrigible, but you had to love him."
