= Langley (provincial electoral district) =

Defunct provincial electoral district in British Columbia, Canada

British Columbia electoral district

Defunct provincial electoral district
- Legislature: Legislative Assembly of British Columbia
- District abolished: 2024
- First contested: 1966
- Last contested: 2020

Demographics
- Population (2001): 54,174
- Area (km²): 576

Langley is a former provincial electoral district for the Legislative Assembly of British Columbia, Canada. The riding was first contested in the 1966 general election.

The riding was created out of the Delta constituency in 1966. Until the election of 1991, it was considered a safe seat for the Social Credit Party. Since then, the BC Liberals have won the seat by significant margins in six consecutive elections. It returned one MLA from 1966 to 1986, two MLAs from 1986 to 1991, and one MLA from 1991 to the present day.

Under the 2021 redistribution that took effect with the 2024 election, the riding ceased to exist under its current name after almost 60 consecutive years. The largest portion of the district formed the new seat of Langley-Willowbrook, while its southern end became part of Langley-Abbotsford.

== Demographics ==
Population, 2001	54,174
Population Change, 1996–2001	6.6%
Area (km^{2})	94
Pop. Density (people per km^{2})	576

== Members of the Legislative Assembly ==
Assembly	Years	Member	Party
28th	1966–1969	Hunter Bertram Vogel	Social Credit
29th	1969–1972	Hunter Bertram Vogel	Social Credit
30th	1972–1975	Robert Howard McClelland	Social Credit
31st	1975–1979	Robert Howard McClelland	Social Credit
32nd	1979–1983	Robert Howard McClelland	Social Credit
33rd	1983–1986	Robert Howard McClelland	Social Credit
34th	1986–1991	Robert Howard McClelland	Social Credit
Two Member District
34th	1986–1991	Carol Gran	Social Credit
34th	1986–1991	Dan Peterson	Social Credit
35th	1991–1996	Lynn Stephens	Liberal
36th	1996–2001	Lynn Stephens	Liberal
37th	2001–2005	Lynn Stephens	Liberal
38th	2005–2009	Mary Polak	Liberal
39th	2009–2013	Mary Polak	Liberal
40th	2013–2017	Mary Polak	Liberal
41st	2017–2020	Mary Polak	Liberal
42nd	2020–2024	Andrew Mercier	New Democratic

== Election results ==
2020 British Columbia general election
Party	Candidate	Votes	%	±%	Expenditures
New Democratic	Andrew Mercier	11,089	47.17	+12.56	$28,812.20
Liberal	Mary Polak	8,014	34.09	−10.31	$41,052.70
Green	Bill Masse	2,469	10.50	−4.77	$1,354.87
Conservative	Shelly Jan	1,936	8.24	+3.20	$14,325.84
Total valid votes		23,508	100.00	–	
Total rejected ballots					
Turnout					
Registered voters					
Source: Elections BC

2017 British Columbia general election
Party	Candidate	Votes	%	±%	Expenditures
Liberal	Mary Polak	10,755	44.40	−7.04	$57,403
New Democratic	Gail Chaddock-Costello	8,384	34.61	+7.48	$9,689
Green	Elizabeth Helen Walker	3,699	15.27	+5.72	
Conservative	Justin Greenwood	1,221	5.04	−6.84	$171
Libertarian	Robert Kerr Pobran	166	0.68	–	
Total valid votes		24,225	100.00		
Total rejected ballots		128	0.53		
Turnout		24,353	59.40		
Source: Elections BC

2013 British Columbia general election
Party	Candidate	Votes	%	±%	Expenditures
Liberal	Mary Polak	14,039	51.44	−5.18	$110,992
New Democratic	Andrew Mercier	7,403	27.13	−8.64	$57,812
Conservative	John Cummins	3,242	11.88	–	$21,714
Green	Wally Martin	2,608	9.55	+1.95	$586
Total valid votes		27,292	100.00		
Total rejected ballots		122	0.45		
Turnout		27,414	59.06		
Source: Elections BC

B.C. General Election 2009 Langley
Party	Candidate	Votes	%	±%
Liberal	Mary Polak	13,295	56.62%	
NDP	Kathleen Stephany	8,400	35.77%	
Green	Ron Abgrall	1,788	7.61%	–
Total		23,483	100.00%	

B.C. General Election 2005: Langley
Party	Candidate	Votes	%	±%
Liberal	Mary Polak	12,877	52.18%	
NDP	Dean Morrison	8,303	33.64%	
Green	Kathleen Blanche Stephany	3,042	12.33%	–
Marijuana	Chris Scrimes	278	1.13%	
Platinum	Lee Anthony Davies	180	0.73%	–
Total		24,680	100.00%	

B.C. General Election 2001: Langley
Party	Candidate	Votes	%	±	Expenditures
Liberal	Lynn Stephens	14,564	64.85%		$47,825
Green	Pat Taylor	2,847	12.68%	–	$492
NDP	Paul Latham	2,720	12.11%		$1,961
Unity	Gordon Nelson	1,605	7.15%		$4,453
Marijuana	Mavis Becker	723	3.21%		$721
Total valid votes		22,459	100.00%		
Total rejected ballots		66	0.29%		
Turnout		22,525	71.97%		

B.C. General Election 1996: Langley
Party	Candidate	Votes	%	±	Expenditures
Liberal	Lynn Stephens	9,277	46.62%		$50,227
NDP	Kim Richter	5,795	29.12%		$17,136
Reform	Joe Lopushinsky	3,224	16.20%		$33,546
Progressive Democrat	Paul MacDonald	1,195	6.00%	–	
Green	Fely Gotia-Walters	262	1.32%	–	$240
Social Credit	Ian B. Thompson	148	0.74%	–	$5,178
Total valid votes		19,901	100.00%		
Total rejected ballots		125	0.62%		
Turnout		20,026	73.19%		

B.C. General Election 1991: Langley
Party	Candidate	Votes	%	±	Expenditures
Liberal	Lynn Stephens	7,149	38.95%		$5,383
NDP	Derrill Thompson	5,762	31.39%		$22,296
Social Credit	Carol M. Gran	5,201	28.34%	–	$62,018
Family Coalition	Barrie O. Norman	180	0.98%	–	$1,323
Independent	Nora E. Galenzoski	62	0.34%		$120
Total valid votes		18,354	100.00%		
Total rejected ballots		354	1.89%		
Turnout		18,708	76.24%		

== See also ==
- List of British Columbia provincial electoral districts
- Canadian provincial electoral districts
