= Canadian Medical Protective Association =

Canadian not-for-profit organization

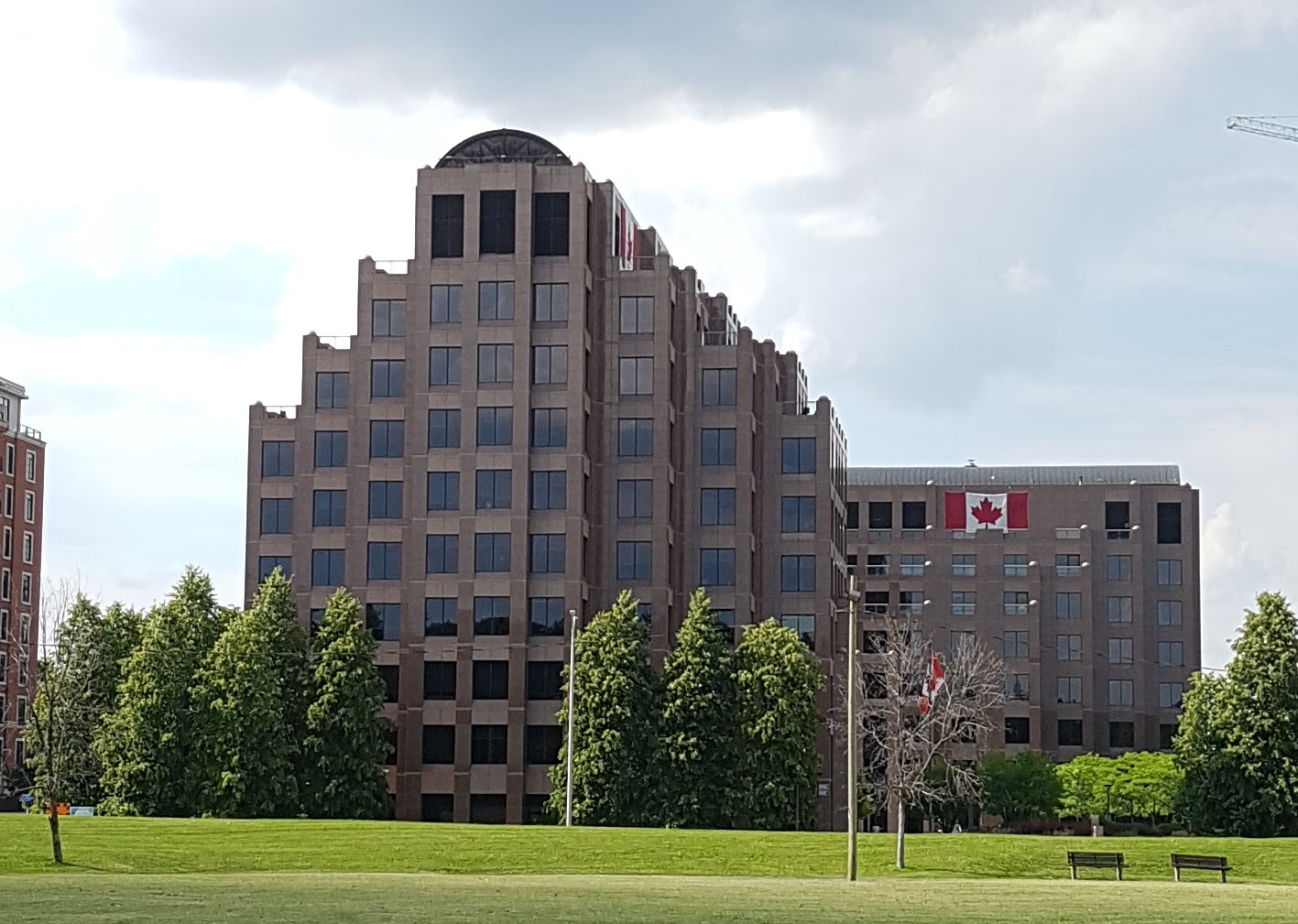
- CMPA headquarters
- Type: Non-profit organization / Special Act Corporation
- Purpose: To protect the professional integrity of physicians and promote safe medical care in Canada
- Headquarters: Ottawa, Ontario, Canada
- Executive Director / CEO: Lisa Calder
- Website: cmpa-acpm.ca

The Canadian Medical Protective Association (CMPA) is a membership-based, not-for-profit organization that provides legal defence, liability protection, and risk-management education for physicians in Canada. The CMPA also provides compensation to patients and their families proven to have been harmed by negligent medical care (fault in Québec). In 2016, the CMPA's membership list totaled 95,691 physicians.

The organization has its headquarters in Ottawa, Ontario, Canada.

== History ==
=== Early days ===
Founded at the 1901 annual meeting of the Canadian Medical Association, the CMPA was incorporated by an Act of Parliament on 27 February 1913, and given Royal Assent on 16 May 1913.

On its 100th anniversary, the CMPA published A History of the Canadian Medical Protective Association 1901-2001. This document contains excerpts from the earliest CMPA annual reports. From pages 7–9:

Object of the New Association Dr. R.W. Powell, who was the first president of the CMPA, retained the position for 33 years. Dr. Powell’s annual reports optimistically predicted the CMPA would be a large and important organization while describing the difficulties in increasing the membership. His reports are interspersed with harangues on recruiting new members and the 1911 annual report boasted: We have struck terror into the evil minded who have sought to besmirch and even blackmail members of our noble profession. The business of the CMPA was and still is protecting physicians, which it does by hiring the best legal help. Testament to the calibre of the legal assistance is evidenced by the number of CMPA counsel who have been appointed to the bench in provincial and federal courts through the years.

Incorporation - A Stormy Passage The Act of Incorporation generated considerable lively debate in both the House of Commons and Senate of Canada. Members of Parliament received petitions objecting to it. Feelings ran high. An MP said in debate: I think this legislation is dangerous. It is legislation against the interests of the mass of the people, and is the creation of a monopolistic corporation... against the rights of the individual in the matter of the selection of his method of cure and treatment in the case of disease. Speaking about protecting the rights of the individual, another MP summed up: If the individual realizes that instead of going up against a man whom he believes to be guilty, he has to go up against a strong corporation composed of the medical men of the country, with a fund at their disposal to fight such cases, I think he will feel that an injustice is being done. There was also concern about recruiting physicians to support a plaintiff's case in court.

Consistent Core Values Dr Powell often reiterated the value: Our organization does not consist in the fights we have put up or in the open success we have had but rather in the silent influence we have swayed against litigants who for a money gain have sought to blast the reputation of conscientious, painstaking and reputable practitioners knowing or suspecting that they have an easy mark and that to avoid publicity a medical man will often submit to what amounts to blackmail. These litigants have found out that our Counsel stands ready to accept service of the writ and your Executive stands ready with a bank account to furnish the sinews of war. Dozens and dozens of cases have thus been strangled at their inception and have disappeared like dew off the grass. This feature gentlemen is the strength and glory of your association. (CMPA Annual Report, 1919)

The CMPA co-sponsored the 10th Annual International Conference on Medical Regulation, which took place at the Ottawa Convention Centre in October 2012.

== Governance ==
The CMPA is a Special Act corporation because it was established by virtue of an Act of Canadian Parliament. The CMPA is not a regulated insurer. It offers medico-legal services to members, defined in the act as licensed physicians practicing in Canada. Unlike some insurers, the CMPA offers discretionary medico-legal assistance and follows by-laws dictating how and when it can offer its services.

In its Strategic Plan, the CMPA's stated mission is "To protect the professional integrity of physicians and promote safe medical care in Canada." To that end, the CMPA seeks to resolve medico-legal matters on behalf of its member, identify and promote practices that reduce physicians' medical liability risk, identify system-level changes to reduce adverse events, and support public policy that contributes to an effective and sustainable medical liability system.

== Patient safety ==
In recent years the CMPA has promoted itself as a contributor to safer medical care, by claiming to reduce the number and severity of adverse medical events. Each year the CMPA hosts a series of "risk management" conferences and symposia for Canadian physicians, delivers approximately 400 customized workshops, and publishes a quarterly magazine (CMPA Perspective), among other activities.

The CMPA partners with the Canadian Patient Safety Institute (CPSI) to develop programs and tools aimed at improving patient safety: Canadian Disclosure Guidelines, CPSI Safety Competencies, Canadian Patient Safety Officer Course, Patient Safety Education Program, and the Advancing Safety for Patients in Residency (ASPIRE) program.

Nevertheless, as noted by the 2008 Canadian Healthcare Safety Symposium, there is more work to be done to improve patient safety:

The progress of the patient safety movement is being stymied by regulatory, structural and attitudinal problems, according to speakers at the eighth annual Canadian Healthcare Safety Symposium. A 'huge gulf' exists between the number of Canadian patients injured by negligence and those who receive compensation, said University of Alberta law professor Gerald Robertson. 'One must seriously question the efficacy of a model which compensates so few who are entitled to it.' Only about 2% of patients injured by negligence in Canada receive compensation, he said, basing his calculation on figures from the Canadian Medical Protective Association research estimating the number of preventable adverse events in Canadian hospitals. Meanwhile, the number of lawsuits against Canadian doctors is dropping — down 30% since 1998 (from 1339 suits commenced in 1998, to 928 suits in 2007) — and only 30% of plaintiffs seeking compensation are successful in court, Robertson noted. Medical negligence cases are complex, time-consuming, expensive and almost always undertaken on a contingency-fee basis. As a result, lawyers are unlikely to take on cases unless there is a chance of a settlement valued over $100 000, he said, noting that lawyers usually seek a fee equal to 30% of a successful settlement. The patient-safety movement may 'raise consciousness' about the need for better compensation for patients, since it will likely raise awareness about the frequency of adverse medical events.

One claimant who received compensation, Campbellford resident John Lewis, said "one of the main barriers to patient safety in this country" is the Canadian Medical Protective Association. "It's extremely powerful because of the political influence it wields."

Critics of loser-pays rules and bans on contingency fees say such efforts discriminate against patients who can't afford to pursue a claim. However, Canada's loser-pays rule is rarely invoked by the CMPA, largely because most plaintiffs are not in a position to pay.

== Liability protection ==
The CMPA describes itself as a "mutual defence" organization for doctors. In other words, it is not an insurance company. There is no contract between the CMPA and member physicians ensuring that the CMPA pays damages to victims of medical malpractice. When a doctor is brought before the Canadian justice system, the doctor's legal defence is funded by the CMPA, which uses its discretion on the cases it takes. The CMPA may defend a doctor sued in civil court for medical negligence causing injury, and may also defend a doctor charged in criminal court for offenses ranging from financial fraud (such as over-billing), to malfeasance, sexual battery, and felony crimes.

CMPA - National Statistics 2012
Action	Number
Legal actions commenced	869
Legal actions proceeding to trial → won by the patient	10
Legal actions proceeding to trial → won by the doctor	63
Legal actions settled out of court	444
Legal actions dismissed, discontinued, or abandoned	514

The national statistics for negligence lawsuits shown in the table (right) are from the 2012 CMPA Annual Report. The CMPA does not distinguish between lawsuits which are dismissed, discontinued, or abandoned, but provides only an accumulated total for this category. A lawsuit may be dismissed by the courts, or a lawyer may inform a plaintiff that there is no reasonable chance of success with a lawsuit, in which case it may be abandoned or discontinued. Often, a Statement of Claim is filed years before the case is resolved, thus the number of actions commenced in a given year need not equal the sum of the resolved cases in that year.

== Financing ==
Doctors pay annual membership fees to the CMPA. Provincial governments reimburse a portion of those fees as part of negotiated contracts with provincial medical associations, in lieu of other forms of compensation provided to Canadian physicians.

Membership fees, together with investment income, have enabled the CMPA to acquire a $2.6 billion reserve fund used to provide doctors with legal defence for cases in which the CMPA deems are defensible. CMPA funds are also used to provide compensation, in the form of awards and settlements, to patients and their families found to have been harmed by negligent clinical care. In 2012, CMPA paid out $249 million in awards and settlements.

== No-fault medical compensation ==
When the CMPA was incorporated there was an imbalance of knowledge between doctor and patient, which in turn led to what may be considered an imbalance of power in the doctor-patient relationship. Some point to abuse by MDs, both in the healthcare system and in the court system. The arrival of the internet brought a sea change. Today, objective medical information is so readily available that patients no longer need to live in a city with a university medical library to become informed about their own health conditions. Doctor rating sites have sprung up, covering every continent. The skill level of MDs, or lack thereof, may be exposed on such sites. Doctors need to keep up to date with technical advances in their field, and demonstrate high ethical standards. Patients, meanwhile, are demanding a medical Glasnost of transparency and accountability.

Some critics of the current system want to replace the current tort-based system with a so-called "no-fault" medical compensation system. In 2008, the Canadian Medical Association Journal printed a three-part series on this topic. In 2008, Healthcare Quarterly published "Giving Back the Pen: Disclosure, Apology and Early Compensation After Harm in the Health Care Setting." The title refers to a comment made by Bishop Desmond Tutu regarding the importance of restitution after harm: If you take my pen and say you are sorry and don't give me back my pen, nothing has happened.

In 2005 the CMPA published a comparative analysis of medical liability systems internationally, including in countries with "no fault" systems. It called for "common sense reforms" within the current tort-based compensation system, concluding that Canada's current system is fundamentally sound and "is very likely the best possible model for our circumstances."

== See also ==
- Medical malpractice
- Negligence
