= Lynn Stephens =

Canadian politician

Member of the British Columbia Legislative Assembly for Langley
- In office October 17, 1991 – May 17, 2005
- Preceded by: Carol Gran; Dan Peterson
- Succeeded by: Mary Polak

Minister of State Responsible for Women of British Columbia
- In office June 2001 – January 2004
- Premier: Gordon Campbell

Personal details
- Born: October 12, 1941 (age 85) Regina, Saskatchewan
- Party: BC Liberal

Mary Lynn Stephens (born October 12, 1941) is a former Canadian politician who served as a member of the Legislative Assembly of British Columbia (MLA) from 1991 to 2005. A member of the BC Liberal Party, she represented the riding of Langley and served as the Minister of State Responsible for Women from 2001 to 2004 under Premier Gordon Campbell.

Stephens was born in Regina, Saskatchewan.
