= Bob McClelland =

Canadian politician (1933-2015)

Member of the British Columbia Legislative Assembly for Langley
- In office August 30, 1972 – October 22, 1986
- Preceded by: Hunter Vogel
- Succeeded by: Carol Gran; Dan Peterson

Minister of Industry and Small Business Development of British Columbia
- In office February 27, 1985 – August 13, 1986
- Premier: Bill Bennett; Bill Vander Zalm
- Preceded by: Don Phillips
- Succeeded by: Position abolished

Minister of Labour of British Columbia
- In office August 10, 1982 – February 27, 1985
- Premier: Bill Bennett
- Preceded by: Jack Heinrich
- Succeeded by: Terry Segarty

Minister of Energy, Mines and Petroleum Resources of British Columbia
- In office November 24, 1979 – August 10, 1982
- Premier: Bill Bennett
- Preceded by: Jim Hewitt
- Succeeded by: Brian Smith

Minister of Health of British Columbia
- In office December 22, 1975 – November 24, 1979
- Premier: Bill Bennett
- Preceded by: Dennis Cocke
- Succeeded by: Rafe Mair

Personal details
- Born: Robert Howard McClelland; November 2, 1933 Calgary, Alberta
- Died: September 29, 2015 (aged 81) Nanaimo, British Columbia
- Party: Social Credit
- Occupation: Broadcaster

Robert Howard McClelland (November 2, 1933 – September 29, 2015) was a broadcaster, journalist and political figure in British Columbia, Canada. He represented Langley in the Legislative Assembly of British Columbia from 1972 to 1986 as a member of the Social Credit Party, and served as cabinet minister under premiers Bill Bennett and Bill Vander Zalm.

== Early life and career ==
McClelland was born and educated in Calgary, Alberta, then moved to British Columbia as a driver for a furniture moving company. In the 1960s he worked at various radio stations including CHWK Chilliwack, CJJC Langley, CHQT Edmonton and CHQM Vancouver; he subsequently returned to CJJC to serve as operations manager. He had also worked as publisher of the Fraser Valley News Herald and a monthly country and western music newspaper, and served as Langley alderman from 1969 to 1972.

He was married twice, and was father to two children.

== Provincial politics ==
McClelland ran as a Social Credit (Socred) candidate in the 1972 provincial election, and was elected member of the Legislative Assembly for Langley, serving as opposition health critic in the 30th Parliament. With the Socreds losing power in that election, leader W. A. C. Bennett resigned in 1973, and McClelland joined the subsequent leadership race. He finished in second place on the first ballot, losing to Bennett's son Bill.

The Socreds returned to power in the 1975 election, and the re-elected McClelland was named to Bill Bennett's cabinet that December as Minister of Health. Following his re-election in 1979, he was re-assigned as Minister of Energy, Mines and Petroleum Resources that November, then became Minister of Labour in August 1982. He earned the nickname "Broadway Bob" from his opponents after a controversy arose in 1982 about a taxpayer-funded visit to New York City in 1980; the trip included tickets to a burlesque Broadway musical and costs for keeping a limousine on standby for ten hours at Plaza Hotel.

McClelland was re-elected in 1983, and in February 1985 became Minister of Industry and Small Business Development. The night before taking on his new cabinet role, he phoned and paid $130 to Top Hat Productions, a Victoria escort service that was under surveillance by police. In November 1985, McClelland was called by the defence to testify in the criminal trial of Top Hat's operator, Arlie Blakely, who faced 19 counts of offences related to prostitution. McClelland testified that he had drunk too much alcohol that night to retain memory of everything that happened. The matter became known as the "Top Hat Affair".

McClelland remained in cabinet until his resignation in August 1986, one week after Bill Vander Zalm took over as premier; he did not contest that October's election.

== Retirement and death ==
After retiring from politics, McClelland moved to Gabriola Island with his wife Denise. He died of cancer in Nanaimo on September 29, 2015, at the age of 81.
