= British Columbia Medical Journal =

- Discipline: Medicine
- Language: English
- Edited by: D.R. Richardson

Publication details
- Former names: Vancouver Medical Association Bulletin, British Columbia Medical Journal
- History: 1924–present
- Publisher: BC Medical Association (Canada)
- Frequency: 10/year

Standard abbreviations
- ISO 4: B. C. Med. J.

Indexing
- CODEN: BCMJAC
- ISSN: 0007-0556
- LCCN: 79310920 cn 79310920
- OCLC no.: 01586013

Links
- Journal homepage; Online archive

The British Columbia Medical Journal is a peer-reviewed general medical journal covering scientific research, review articles, and updates on contemporary clinical practices written by British Columbian physicians or focused on topics likely to be of interest to them, such as columns from the BC Centre for Disease Control and the Insurance Corporation of British Columbia. Although published by the Doctors of BC professional association, it maintains distance from the association in order to encourage open debate. It hosts an online database of all issues from 2000. The current editor-in-chief is David R. Richardson.

== Frequency of publication ==
The journal publishes 10 issues per year, with combined issues in January/February and July/August.

== History ==
The journal was originally known as the Vancouver Medical Association Bulletin and was published by the Vancouver Medical Association (VMA) for 34 years, from October 1924 until January 1959.

In its early years, the journal relied heavily on advertiser supporting. In 1957, as this income had begun to decline, the VMA and the BCMA entered into an agreement to restructure the publication, including its retitling, with BCMA paying to sustain the financially troubled journal. The first issue under the British Columbia Medical Journal title was released in January 1959. In January 1963, in response to continued decreasing advertiser support, the BCMA took over the journal completely.

== Cover art ==
Jerry Wong has been the cover artist for the British Columbia Medical Journal since 1982.

== Open access ==
The British Columbia Medical Journal is an open access journal. All articles from 2000 onwards are archived on the journal's web site.

== Indexation ==
As in June 2024, one paper from this journal is indexed in PubMed.

== Current Status ==
The journal is publishing articles online on a regular basis (september 2026).

== J.H. MacDermot Prize ==
Till 1967, the British Columbia Medical Journal welcomed article submissions from student authors, and each year awarded a prize of $1000 for the best article written by a medical student in the province of British Columbia. The prize honored John Henry MacDermot (1883–1969), who became the editor of the Vancouver Medical Bulletin at its formation in 1924, remaining at the helm until 1967, when he retired.
