= Langley-Willowbrook =

Provincial electoral district in British Columbia, Canada

British Columbia electoral district
- Interactive map of riding boundaries

Provincial electoral district
- Legislature: Legislative Assembly of British Columbia
MLA
Jody Toor
Conservative
- District created: 2023
- First contested: 2024
- Last contested: 2026

Demographics
- Population (2021): 57,709
- Area (km²): 23
- Pop. density (per km²): 2,509.1
- Census division: Metro Vancouver
- Census subdivision: Langley

Langley-Willowbrook is a provincial electoral district for the Legislative Assembly of British Columbia.

The riding was created under the 2021 British Columbia electoral redistribution and was first contested in the 2024 general election. It was formed from portions of Langley.

== Demographics ==
Population, 2021	57,709
Area (km^{2})	23
Pop. Density (people per km^{2})	2,509
Source: BC Electoral Boundaries Commission

== Geography ==
The riding encompasses the City of Langley, and portions of the Township of Langley immediately north and south of the city's limits, including the Willowbrook neighbourhood.

== Members of the Legislative Assembly ==
This riding has elected the following members of the Legislative Assembly:

Assembly	Years	Member	Party
Langley-Willowbrook; Riding created from Langley
43rd	2024–2026	Jody Toor	Conservative
44th	2026–present	Jody Toor	Conservative

== Election results ==
2026 British Columbia general election
The 2026 general election will be held on October 24.
Party	Candidate	Votes	%	±%	Expenditures
OneBC	Shubham Joshi				
Conservative	Jody Toor				
New Democratic	Andrew Mercier				
Green	Anisha Sandhu				
Total valid votes					
Total rejected ballots					
Turnout					
Registered voters					
Source: Elections BC

2024 British Columbia general election
Party	Candidate	Votes	%	±%	Expenditures
Conservative	Jody Toor	10,979	48.24	+40.4	$65,269.39
New Democratic	Andrew Mercier	10,112	44.43	-5.0	$52,816.43
Green	Petrina Arnason	1,670	7.34	-3.1	$1,993.47
Total valid votes/expense limit		22,761	99.92	–	$71,700.08
Total rejected ballots		18	0.08	–	
Turnout		22,779	55.44	–	
Registered voters		41,088			
Conservative notional gain from New Democratic		Swing		+22.7	
Source: Elections BC

2020 provincial election redistributed results
Party	%
New Democratic	49.4
Liberal	32.4
Green	10.4
Conservative	7.8

== See also ==
- List of British Columbia provincial electoral districts
- Canadian provincial electoral districts
