= William Vogel =

Canadian politician (1931–2019)

William M. Vogel

Mayor of Surrey, British Columbia
- In office 1978–1980
- Preceded by: Edward McKitka
- Succeeded by: Don Ross

Personal details
- Born: November 16, 1931 Burnaby, British Columbia
- Died: February 1, 2019 (aged 87) Langley, British Columbia
- Parents: Hunter Vogel (father); Margaret Isabel Gunn (mother)
- Occupation: businessman, pilot

William Michael Vogel (November 16, 1931 – February 1, 2019) was a Canadian politician who served as Mayor of Surrey, British Columbia from 1978 to 1980. He previously served as an alderman on Surrey City Council from 1973 to 1977. Prior to his death he lived in Langley, British Columbia and was a former pilot. His father, Hunter Vogel was a businessman and founder/owner of the Cloverdale Paint company. His father was also a former mayor of Langley, as well as a member of the British Columbia Legislature. Vogel died in Langley, British Columbia on February 1, 2019, at the age of 87.
