= Andrew Mercier =

Canadian politician

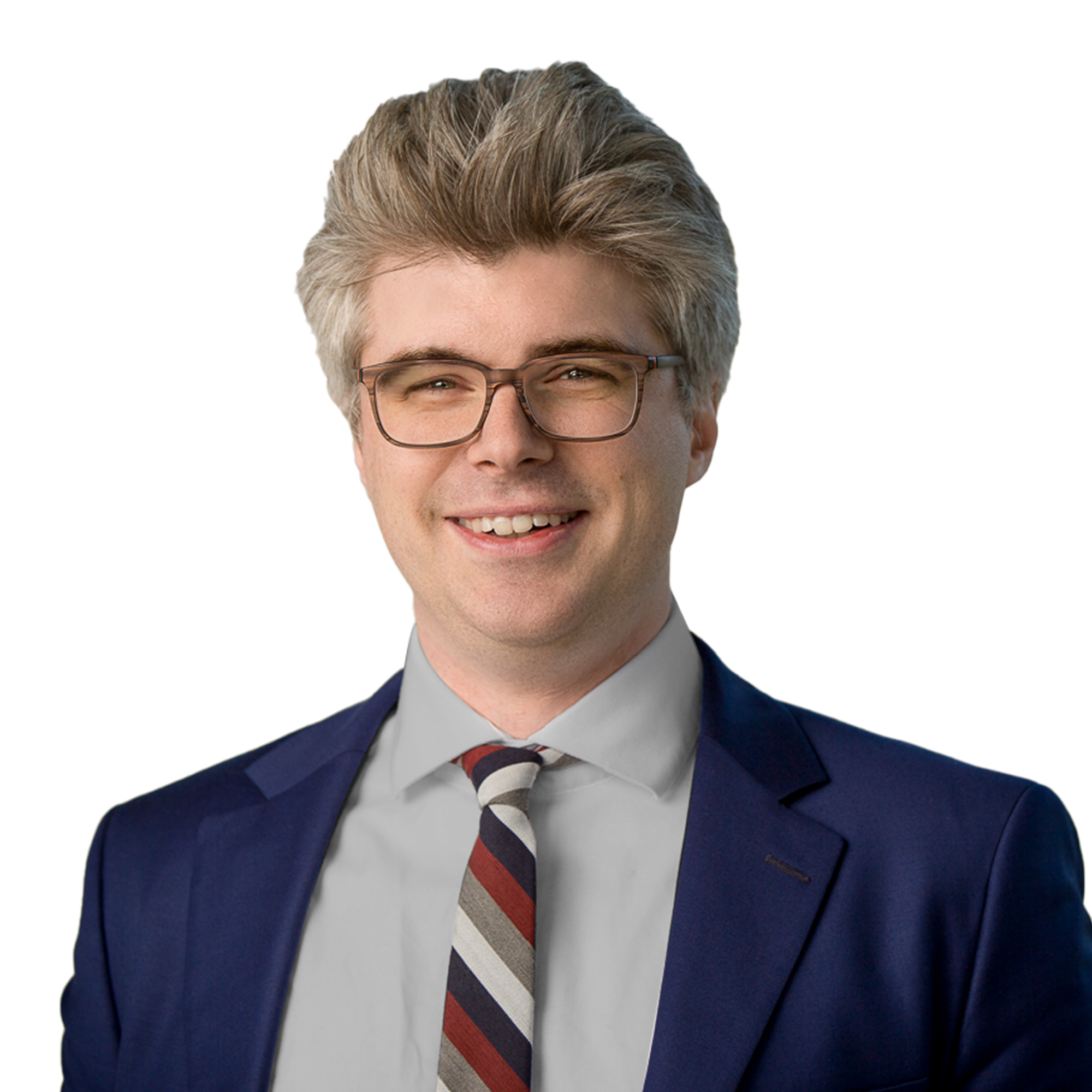

Minister of State for Sustainable Forestry Innovation of British Columbia
- In office January 15, 2024 – November 18, 2024
- Premier: David Eby
- Preceded by: Position established

Minister of State for Workplace Development of British Columbia
- In office December 7, 2022 – January 15, 2024
- Premier: David Eby
- Preceded by: Position established
- Succeeded by: Position abolished

Parliamentary Secretary for Skills Training of British Columbia
- In office November 26, 2020 – December 7, 2022
- Premier: John Horgan; David Eby
- Preceded by: Position established
- Succeeded by: Position abolished

Member of the British Columbia Legislative Assembly for Langley
- In office October 24, 2020 – September 21, 2024
- Preceded by: Mary Polak
- Succeeded by: Jody Toor

Personal details
- Born: 1985
- Party: New Democratic
- Education: Dalhousie University; University of New Brunswick
- Occupation: Lawyer; Trade Unionist

Andrew Mercier (born 1985) is a Canadian politician and trade unionist who served as a member the Legislative Assembly of British Columbia (MLA) from 2020 to 2024. A member of the British Columbia New Democratic Party, he represented the riding of Langley.

== Early life ==
Raised in Langley, British Columbia, Mercier graduated from the University of New Brunswick with a Bachelor of Arts Degree and in 2017 graduated from the Schulich School of Law at Dalhousie University with a Juris Doctor.

Prior to his election, Mercier held a variety of positions within the labour movement, most recently serving as the executive director of the BC Building Trades Council and as legal counsel for Teamsters Local 213.

== Political career ==
Mercier was elected in the 2020 general election and served as the Parliamentary Secretary for Skills Training from 2020 to 2022. Later he served as the Minister of State for Workforce Development from 2022 to 2024 and as Minister of State for Sustainable Forestry Innovation in 2024 until his election defeat in the 2024 general election. He contested the riding of Langley-Willowbrook but was unseated by Conservative Party candidate Jody Toor.

In 2026, Mercier endorsed Rob Ashton in that year's federal NDP leadership race.

== Electoral record ==
2026 British Columbia general election: Langley-Willowbrook
Party	Candidate	Votes	%	±%	Expenditures
Conservative	Jody Toor	10,720	52.30		
New Democratic	Andrew Mercier	7,400	36.10		
Green	Anisha Sandhu	1,580	7.71		
OneBC	Shubham Joshi	755	3.68	—	
Total valid votes		20,455	99.79		
Total rejected ballots		43	0.21		
Turnout		20,498			
Registered voters					
Conservative hold		Swing		+6.36	
Source: Elections BC

2024 British Columbia general election: Langley-Willowbrook
Party	Candidate	Votes	%	±%	Expenditures
Conservative	Jody Toor	10,979	48.24	+40.4	$65,269.39
New Democratic	Andrew Mercier	10,112	44.43	-5.0	$52,816.43
Green	Petrina Arnason	1,670	7.34	-3.1	$1,993.47
Total valid votes/expense limit		22,761	99.92	–	$71,700.08
Total rejected ballots		18	0.08	–	
Turnout		22,779	55.44	–	
Registered voters		41,088			
Conservative notional gain from New Democratic		Swing		+22.7	
Source: Elections BC

2020 British Columbia general election: Langley
Party	Candidate	Votes	%	±%	Expenditures
New Democratic	Andrew Mercier	11,089	47.17	+12.56	$28,812.20
Liberal	Mary Polak	8,014	34.09	−10.31	$41,052.70
Green	Bill Masse	2,469	10.50	−4.77	$1,354.87
Conservative	Shelly Jan	1,936	8.24	+3.20	$14,325.84
Total valid votes		23,508	100.00	–	
Total rejected ballots					
Turnout					
Registered voters					
Source: Elections BC

2013 British Columbia general election: Langley
Party	Candidate	Votes	%	±%	Expenditures
Liberal	Mary Polak	14,039	51.44	−5.18	$110,992
New Democratic	Andrew Mercier	7,403	27.13	−8.64	$57,812
Conservative	John Cummins	3,242	11.88	–	$21,714
Green	Wally Martin	2,608	9.55	+1.95	$586
Total valid votes		27,292	100.00		
Total rejected ballots		122	0.45		
Turnout		27,414	59.06		
Source: Elections BC
