= Carol Gran =

Canadian politician

Kelowna City Councillor
- In office December 5, 2005 – December 1, 2008

Member of the British Columbia Legislative Assembly for Langley
- In office October 22, 1986 – September 20, 1991 Serving with Dan Peterson
- Preceded by: Bob McClelland
- Succeeded by: Lynn Stephens

Personal details
- Born: November 18, 1941 (age 84) Saskatoon, Saskatchewan
- Party: British Columbia Social Credit Party

Caroline Mary "Carol" Gran (née Millard; November 18, 1941) is a former political figure in British Columbia. She represented Langley in the Legislative Assembly of British Columbia from 1986 to 1991 as a Social Credit member.

She was born in Saskatoon, Saskatchewan, the daughter of Charles Richard Millard and Hilda Irene Handbury, and was educated in Winfield, Alberta. In 1970, she married John Arvid Gran, her second husband. Before entering politics, she worked as an ad copywriter in the broadcasting industry. Gran was an alderman for Langley, British Columbia. She served in the provincial cabinet as Minister of Government Management Services, Minister responsible for Women's Programs, and Minister responsible for the Family. Gran was defeated by Lynn Stephens when she ran for reelection to the provincial assembly in 1991. She was a member of the Kelowna City Council as a city councillor from 2005 to 2008. In 2011, Gran ran unsuccessfully for a seat for Kelowna City Council.
