= William Canniff =

Canadian surgeon and historian (1830–1910)

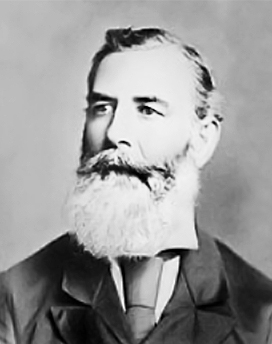
- Born: June 20, 1830; Thurlow, Upper Canada
- Died: October 18, 1910; Belleville, Ontario, Canada
- Occupations: Surgeon, Public Health Physician
- Known for: First permanent Medical Officer of Health in Toronto, Ontario, Canada

William Canniff (born in Thurlow, Upper Canada, 20 June 1830; died in Belleville, Ontario 18 October 1910) was a surgeon, public health pioneer, historian and advocate of Canadian nationalism.

== Education ==
Dr. William Canniff trained in medicine in Canada, the US, Great Britain and Europe prior to settling in Belleville where he practiced surgery. In 1852 he enrolled at the Victoria College Medical School studying under Dr. William Thomas Aikins. Following brief periods of study and practice in New York, London, Edinburgh, Dublin, and Paris, Canniff returned to Belleville, Ontario, joining the faculty of the Victoria School in 1859 as a lecturer in pathology. Canniff was rapidly promoted to Professor of Surgery, however, he resigned his position in 1863 following a conflict with his colleague, John Rolph. Canniff returned to the Victoria School in 1868 and remained there until its closure in 1874. During his brief departure from Victoria College, Canniff authored the first Canadian textbook on pathology, A manual of the principles of surgery: based on pathology for students, Philadelphia: Lindsay & Blakiston, 1866. Canniff became a founding member of the Canadian Medical Association in 1867 and the Ontario Medical Association in 1880.

== Toronto's Medical Officer of Health ==
In 1883, Canniff became Toronto's first permanent Medical Officer of Health. In his role as MOH, Canniff appreciated the role of water in disease transmission, and advocated hygienic waste-water disposal and a centralized drinking water supply for the city. Throughout his tenure as chief medical officer for Toronto, Canniff met resistance from physicians who defied his department's requirement for infectious disease reporting, arguing that the extra effort needed to do this went uncompensated. At the same time, city council continued to pressure Canniff for his failure to collect comprehensive disease surveillance statistics, criticizing his lack of impact on the growing spread of infectious illnesses. Both factors fed Canniff's frustration, ultimately leading to his resignation from the department in 1890. After Canniff's departure, the position remained unfilled for two years until the hiring of Dr. Norman Allen.

== Other interests ==
Canniff was a member of the Canada First movement whose membership promoted Canadian nationalism. Canniff was also a noted historian, authoring History Of The Settlement Of Upper Canada, Ontario: With Special Reference To The Bay Quinte, Toronto: Dudley & Burns, Toronto, 1869; Mason; History Of The Province Of Ontario (Upper Canada), Toronto: A.H. Hovey, 1872; and The Medical Profession in Upper Canada 1783-1850, Toronto: William Briggs, 1894.
