= Mary Polak =

Canadian politician (born 1960s)

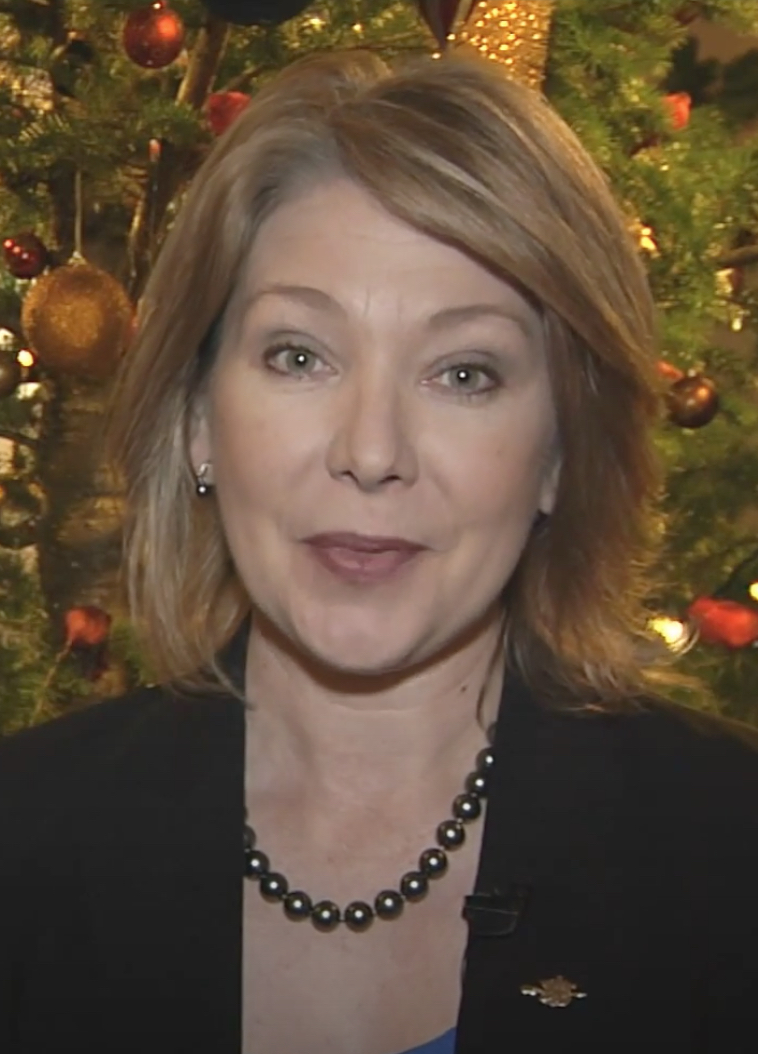

Minister of Health of British Columbia
- In office 12 June 2017 – 18 July 2017
- Premier: Christy Clark
- Preceded by: Terry Lake
- Succeeded by: Adrian Dix

Minister of Environment of British Columbia
- In office 10 June 2013 – 12 June 2017
- Premier: Christy Clark
- Preceded by: Terry Lake
- Succeeded by: Jordan Sturdy

Minister of Transportation and Infrastructure of British Columbia
- In office 5 September 2012 – 10 June 2013
- Premier: Christy Clark
- Preceded by: Blair Lekstrom
- Succeeded by: Todd Stone

Minister of Aboriginal Relations and Reconciliation of British Columbia
- In office 14 March 2011 – 5 September 2012
- Premier: Christy Clark
- Preceded by: Barry Penner
- Succeeded by: Ida Chong

Minister of Children and Family Development and Minister Responsible for Child Care of British Columbia
- In office 10 June 2009 – 14 March 2011
- Premier: Gordon Campbell
- Preceded by: Tom Christensen
- Succeeded by: Mary McNeil

Minister of Healthy Living and Sport of British Columbia
- In office 23 June 2008 – 10 June 2009
- Premier: Gordon Campbell
- Succeeded by: Ida Chong

Parliamentary Secretary to the Minister of Health for the Conversation on Health of British Columbia
- In office 19 December 2006 – 23 June 2008
- Premier: Gordon Campbell

Member of the British Columbia Legislative Assembly for Langley
- In office 17 May 2005 – 21 September 2020
- Preceded by: Lynn Stephens
- Succeeded by: Andrew Mercier

Personal details
- Born: 1967 or 1968 (age 58–59)
- Party: BC Liberal

Mary Ruth Polak (born 1967 or 1968) is a Canadian politician who served as a member of the Legislative Assembly of British Columbia (MLA) representing the riding of Langley from 2005 until her defeat in the 2020 general election. She was re-elected to the Legislative Assembly of British Columbia in 2017, having represented the constituents of Langley since 2005 and was appointed Minister of Health on 12 June 2017 by Premier Christy Clark. Prior to her new cabinet post, she served as the Minister of the Environment, Minister of Transportation and Infrastructure, Minister of Aboriginal Relations and Reconciliation, Minister of Children and Family Development and Minister Responsible for Child Care, Minister of Healthy Living and Sport, and Parliamentary Secretary to the Minister of Health for the Conversation on Health. Before being elected to the legislative assembly, Polak served as a trustee and former chair of the Surrey School Board in Surrey, British Columbia. She currently resides in Langley, British Columbia.

== Surrey School trustee ==
=== Same-sex-parents book controversy ===
Polak was recruited to run as a member of the Surrey Electors Team by school trustee Heather Stilwell. As a Trustee on the Surrey School Board, she voted down a request, along with the majority of the school board, to add three specific books dealing with same sex families as recommended learning resources for the kindergarten and grade one curriculum. These books were requested by a kindergarten teacher to reflect the realities of today's families and to teach his pupils about diversity and tolerance. The Government of British Columbia also declined to approve the same books.

A legal battle to overturn the decision to ban the three books went all the way to the Supreme Court of Canada, where the school board's decision was returned to the board. The judgment cited the need for families headed by same-sex couples to be respected. Chief Justice Beverly McLachlin dismissed the school board's argument that children would be confused or misled by classroom information about same-sex parents. The Surrey School Board then approved a different set of books depicting same sex families. In doing so, Surrey became the first school district in British Columbia to approve books depicting same sex families as recommended learning resources for primary grades, including kindergarten.

=== Results publishing ===
As school board chair, Polak made Surrey the first school district in British Columbia to publish school-by-school results for both elementary and secondary schools. These results were based on controversial standardized tests, opposed by a majority of public school teachers. They were published in Vancouver newspapers as "rankings" by the Fraser Institute. Polak also served as chair of the Council of British Columbia School Districts and on the board of directors of the British Columbia School Trustees Association.

== Provincial politics ==
She tried unsuccessfully to gain a seat in the Legislative Assembly as a candidate for the BC Liberal Party, but lost the 2004 Surrey-Panorama Ridge by-election to Jagrup Brar, the New Democratic Party of British Columbia candidate. This was a substantial defeat for the governing Liberals.

Polak won a seat in the 2005 provincial election in the riding of Langley by over 52%, 18 points ahead of her next closest competitor. As an MLA for Langley she served as the Parliamentary Secretary to the Minister of Health for the Conversation on Health and later as the Minister of Healthy Living and Sport.

Polak ran successfully again in the 2009 Provincial election, earning more than 56% at the polls and increased her margin over her nearest opponent to more than 20 points.

In the 2013 British Columbia general election, Mary Polak sought reelection in Langley for a third term. She won her riding easily with nearly 52% of the popular vote nearly doubling the vote total of Andrew Mercier, the NDP candidate. She also defeated John Cummins, the leader of the British Columbia Conservative Party who received less than 12% of the popular vote. A week before Election Day, Polak's campaign manager, Todd Hauptman, resigned, citing homophobia among the Langley electorate as his reason for stepping down. Polak suggested that Hauptman had not fully disclosed his reasons for resigning. She said that Hauptman quit after being alleged to have leaked information about the Liberal Party's strategy to the New Democratic Party (NDP); Polak said that the New Democratic Party candidate was a friend of Hauptman's. Hauptman, a gay man, issued a press release about his resignation. Xtra!, a magazine that publishes lesbian and gay Canadian news, requested an interview with Hauptman to which he originally assented and later declined.

== Electoral record ==
2020 British Columbia general election: Langley
Party	Candidate	Votes	%	±%	Expenditures
New Democratic	Andrew Mercier	11,089	47.17	+12.56	$28,812.20
Liberal	Mary Polak	8,014	34.09	−10.31	$41,052.70
Green	Bill Masse	2,469	10.50	−4.77	$1,354.87
Conservative	Shelly Jan	1,936	8.24	+3.20	$14,325.84
Total valid votes		23,508	100.00	–	
Total rejected ballots					
Turnout					
Registered voters					
Source: Elections BC

2017 British Columbia general election: Langley
Party	Candidate	Votes	%	±%	Expenditures
Liberal	Mary Polak	10,755	44.40	−7.04	$57,403
New Democratic	Gail Chaddock-Costello	8,384	34.61	+7.48	$9,689
Green	Elizabeth Helen Walker	3,699	15.27	+5.72	
Conservative	Justin Greenwood	1,221	5.04	−6.84	$171
Libertarian	Robert Kerr Pobran	166	0.68	–	
Total valid votes		24,225	100.00		
Total rejected ballots		128	0.53		
Turnout		24,353	59.40		
Source: Elections BC

2013 British Columbia general election: Langley
Party	Candidate	Votes	%	±%	Expenditures
Liberal	Mary Polak	14,039	51.44	−5.18	$110,992
New Democratic	Andrew Mercier	7,403	27.13	−8.64	$57,812
Conservative	John Cummins	3,242	11.88	–	$21,714
Green	Wally Martin	2,608	9.55	+1.95	$586
Total valid votes		27,292	100.00		
Total rejected ballots		122	0.45		
Turnout		27,414	59.06		
Source: Elections BC
