= Canadian Medical Association =

Association of doctors in Canada

- Established: 1867
- Type: Professional association
- Purpose: Advocacy on national health and medical matters
- Headquarters: Ottawa, Ontario, Canada
- Region served: Canada
- Official language: English, French
- President: Dr. Bolu Ogunyemi (2026-2027)
- President-Elect: Dr. Courtney Howard (2027-2028)
- Past-President: Dr. Margot Burnell (2025-2026)
- CEO: Alex Munter
- Website: www.cma.ca

The Canadian Medical Association (CMA; French: Association médicale canadienne, AMC) is a national, voluntary association representing physicians and medical learners in Canada. It engages in policy advocacy and collaborates with provincial and territorial medical associations on health-related matters.

CMA publishes the Canadian Medical Association Journal (often abbreviated as CMAJ) which is a peer-reviewed medical journal that includes original clinical research, commentaries, and reviews of clinical topics, health policy, and practice updates.

== Vision ==
According to its 2024 strategic plan, Impact 2040, the CMA states that its vision is “a vibrant profession and a healthy population.”

The plan outlines goals such as supporting accessible health systems, promoting well-being within the medical profession, and addressing barriers to equitable health outcomes across Canada

== Membership ==
The CMA represents Canadian physicians and medical learners across stages of training and practice. It works with provincial and territorial medical associations and other national organizations on shared policy priorities. Membership is open to every medical learner and physician; it is complimentary for students, residents, the first five years of practice and retirees, and costs $195 every two years for those six or more years in practice.

== History ==
Efforts to form a national medical association date back to 1844, when Quebec physician Dr. Joseph Painchaud and colleagues discussed ways to support physicians and their families. There were false starts in attempts to form an association, but soon after Confederation, practicing physicians were successful in developing a national body.

A formal meeting to establish the Canadian Medical Association took place in Quebec City on October 9 to 11, 1867, with 164 physicians attending to discuss medical education and licensure.Sir Charles Tupper, later Prime Minister of Canada, served as the association’s first president.

The CMA Code of Ethics and Professionalism has existed in one form or another since 1868. As recently as 2015 this document was considered by the CMA to be "arguably the most important document produced by the CMA. It has a history of providing ethical guidance to Canada's physicians. The Code is reviewed and updated periodically with the most recent revision to be released in 2026 at the direction of the CMA Board.

In its first 25 years, meeting attendance was small. There was a notice of motion in 1894 to disband it and in 1921, the association faced insolvency.

The Montreal Medical Journal became the Canadian Medical Association Journal in 1911.

The CMA played a role in the establishment of the Royal College of Physicians and Surgeons of Canada, the College of Family Physicians of Canada, the Canadian Medical Protective Association, and the Medical Council of Canada.

The association participated in public health responses to the 1918 Spanish Flu, the 2002 SARS outbreak, and the 2009-10 H1N1 influenza pandemic.

In the 1930s, the CMA contributed funds toward the creation of the Canadian Cancer Society (CCS), using proceeds from donations made to a national jubilee fund for King George V’s silver jubilee.

Since the 1950s, the CMA has publicly opposed tobacco use and supported policies restricting tobacco marketing in Canada.

In 1957, the CMA helped develop the Registered Retirement Savings Plan, aimed at improving retirement security for Canadians. It later created MD Financial Management to provide financial services for physicians and their families. The CMA sold it to Scotiabank in 2018 for $2.6 billion, under a 10-year collaboration agreement — a decision that drew both support and criticism within the profession.

In 2018, the CMA withdrew from the World Medical Association (WMA) in protest over plagiarism concerns involving the incoming WMA president’s speech. In 2025, the CMA announced it was rejoining the WMA “at a time when global health issues are demanding increasing attention and collective action.”

On September 18, 2024, the CMA issued an apology for its role and the broader medical profession’s involvement in harms to First Nations, Inuit and Métis Peoples in Canada’s health system.

== Advocacy and Policy Work ==
The CMA engages in advocacy on health issues affecting Canadians and the medical profession. It develops policy positions through consultations with members, stakeholder organizations, people with lived experience of the health system and scientific reviews.

Areas of focus have included:

- Improving access to primary care
- Supporting Indigenous health and reconciliation in health care
- Advocating for climate-resilient health systems and environmentally sustainable health care
- Reducing physician burnout
- Improving physicians’ working conditions
- Addressing false health information

=== Trustworthy health information ===
In 2024, the CMA and Abacus Data launched a Health and Media Tracking Survey to shed light on the prevalence of false health information in Canada, its impact on health and the health system, and potential strategies to mitigate the problem.

To improve the media environment and provide accessible, evidence-based health and health system information, the CMA has launched Healthcare for Real and Tellement Santé. The CMA is also advocating for the passage of the federal government’s Safe Social Media Act to hold digital platforms accountable for online harms to people living in Canada, especially children.

=== Medical Assistance in Dying ===
Following the 2015 Supreme Court of Canada decision that struck down the Criminal Code's absolute prohibition on physician-assisted dying, the CMA developed guiding principles for discussions with members and the federal government. The association contributed to the development of MAID legislation through submissions to federal committees and Health Canada.

The CMA’s policy emphasizes respect for patient dignity and the rights of physicians to act according to their conscience — whether to participate in or decline involvement in MAID.

=== Drugs: Pharmacare, opioids and cannabis ===
The CMA supports the goal of ensuring access to medically necessary pharmaceuticals that are safe, effective, and affordable.

It is a member of the Pan-Canadian Collaborative on Education for Improved Opioid Prescribing, which promotes evidence-based prescribing practices.

The association has submitted evidence to parliamentary committees on cannabis policy, identifying health risks and recommending measures to protect children and youth following the Cannabis Act.

=== Health and technology ===
The CMA has examined the role of digital technologies in improving access to care and physicians’ working conditions.

In 2019, it joined the Royal College of Physicians and Surgeons of Canada and the College of Family Physicians of Canada to form a virtual care task force, which issued reports in 2020 and 2022 on virtual health implementation.

More recently, the CMA collaborated with these partners and Canada Health Infoway on recommendations to make it safer and easier to share critical medical records between health professionals and for patients to access their own health data.

The CMA is also working on the trustworthy and effective use of Artificial Intelligence (AI) in health care.

== Physician health and wellness ==
The CMA conducts the National Physician Health Survey (NPHS) — a benchmark for physician wellness across Canada — to measure rates of burnout, anxiety, depression and other forms of psychological distress among doctors and medical learners. The survey was conducted in 2017, 2021 and 2025. Results from the 2025 survey show that after the stresses of the COVID-19 pandemic, doctors are still struggling with excessive workloads, exhaustion and burnout, leading some to reduce clinical hours or consider leaving practice altogether.

== Provincial and territorial medical associations ==
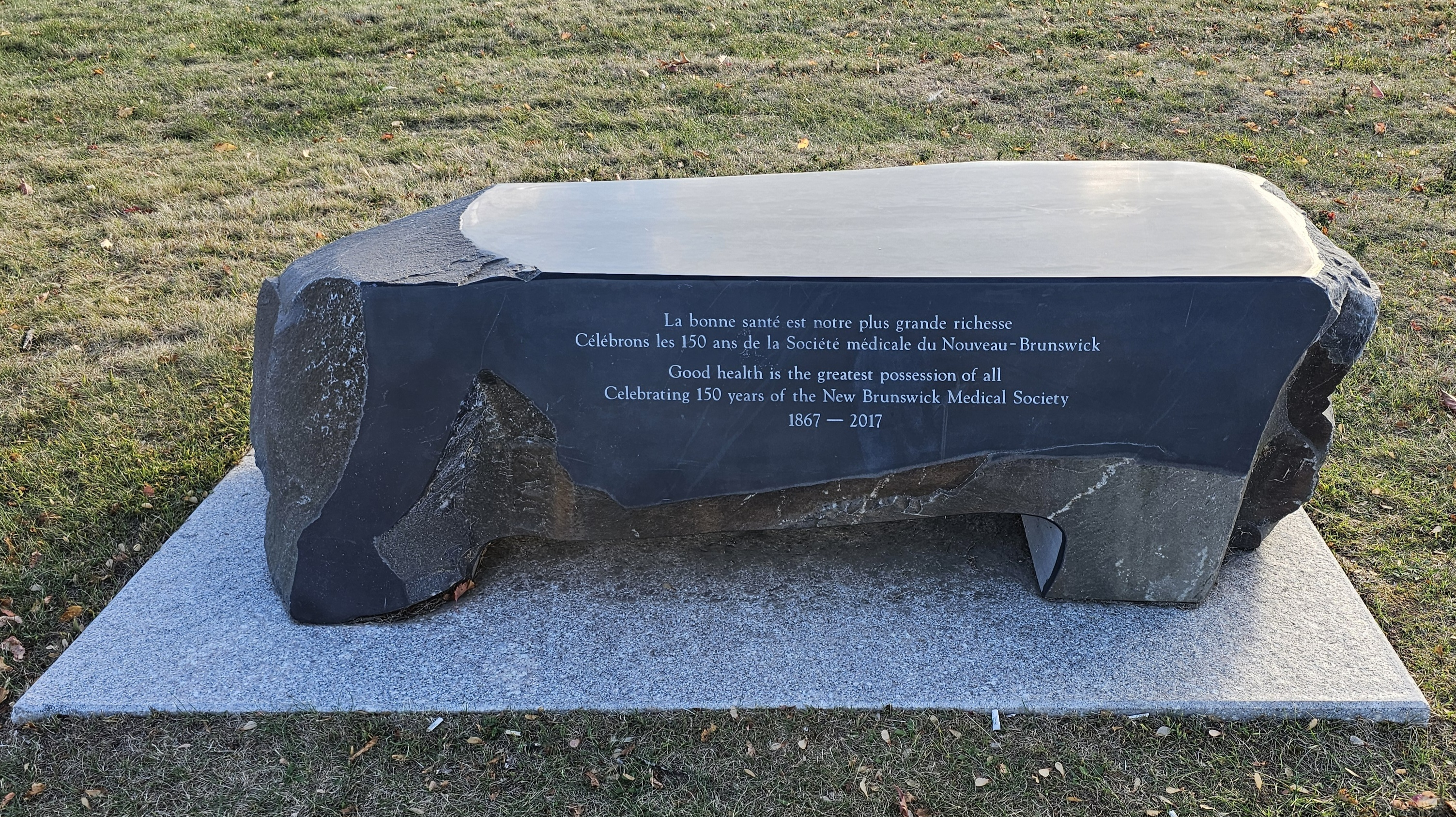
A bench in Fredericton commemorating the 150th anniversary of the New Brunswick Medical Society

The CMA collaborates with organizations representing physicians from coast to coast to coast, including:

- Doctors of BC
- Alberta Medical Association
- Saskatchewan Medical Association
- Doctors Manitoba (the Manitoba Medical Association in the association's bylaws)
- Ontario Medical Association
- New Brunswick Medical Society
- Doctors Nova Scotia
- Medical Society of PEI
- Newfoundland and Labrador Medical Association
- Northwest Territories Medical Association
- Yukon Medical Association

== Governance ==
The CMA Board of Directors includes 19 members, representing physicians, residents, medical students and a lay representative. The board meets four times a year and sets the association’s policy direction. The association holds a public annual general meeting to review financial statements and discuss business matters.

In 2018, the association launched the CMA Patient Voice, a group of 12 individuals that provide a patient’s perspective to the CMA’s work.

The CMA also established at Indigenous Guiding Circle of First Nations, Inuit and Métis leaders, experts, Elders and Knowledge Keepers to guide its work in advancing truth, reconciliation and equity in health care for Indigenous Peoples.

== Subsidiaries and related organizations ==
CMA Impact Inc. oversees business and operations aligned with the CMA’s strategic priorities.

The CMA Foundation provides charitable funding to registered Canadian health charities physicians support initiatives.

The CMAJ Group publishes a range of peer-reviewed publications that support physicians and the medical profession.

== Leadership ==
=== President ===
- 1867, 1868, 1869 – Sir Charles Tupper
- 1870 – Daniel McNeill Parker
- 1871 – James A. Sewell
- 1872 – Sir James Alexander Grant
- 1873 – William Marsden
- 1874 – LeBaron Botsford
- 1875 – E. M. Hodder
- 1876 – William Hales Hingston
- 1877 – Joseph Workman
- 1878 – I. D. MacDonald
- 1879 – R. P. Howard
- 1880 – William Canniff
- 1881 – G. E. Fenwick
- 1882 – J. A. Mullin
- 1883 – M. Sullivan
- 1884 – Sir William Osler
- 1885 – T. K. Holmes
- 1886 – J. E. Graham
- 1887 – George Ross
- 1888 – H. P. Wright
- 1889 – James Ross
- 1890 – Thomas George Roddick
- 1891 – James Bray
- 1892 – Charles Sheard
- 1893 – T. T. S. Harrison
- 1894 – William Bayard
- 1895 – James Thorburn
- 1896 – V. H. Moore
- 1897 – J. M. Beausoleil
- 1898 – I. H. Cameron
- 1899 – R. W. Powell
- 1900 – H. H. Chown
- 1901 – F. J. Shepherd
- 1902 – W. H. Moorehouse
- 1903 – S. J. Tunstall
- 1904 – John Stewart
- 1905 – A. McPhedran
- 1906 – ?
- 1907 – Frederick Montizambert
- 1908 – R. Blanchard
- 1909 – Adam Wright
- 1910 – G. E. Armstrong
- 1911 – H. G. Mackid
- 1912 – H. A. Macallum
- 1913 – Murray MacLaren
- 1914 – R. E. McKechnie
- 1915 – ?
- 1916 – ?
- 1917 – Alexander D. Blackader
- 1918 – Henry Beaumont Small
- 1919 – J. W. Scane
- 1920 – R. E. McKechnie
- 1921 – Murdoch Chisholm
- 1922 – Thomas Glendenning Hamilton
- 1923 – C. F. Martin
- 1924 – J. F. Kidd
- 1925 – David Low
- 1926 – F. Leeder
- 1927 – F. N.G. Starr
- 1928 – S. R. Jenkins
- 1929 – A. T. Bazin
- 1930 – Harvey Smith
- 1931 – A. S. Monro
- 1932 – Alex Primrose
- 1933 – G. A. B. Addy
- 1934 – John McEachern
- 1935 – Jonathan Campbell Meakins
- 1936 – Hermann Robertson
- 1937 – T. H. Leggett
- 1938 – K. A. MacKenzie
- 1939 – F. S. Patch
- 1940 – Duncan Archibald Graham
- 1941 – Gordon S. Fahrni
- 1942 – Albert Ernest Archer
- 1943 – D. S. Lewis
- 1944 – Harris McPhedran
- 1945 – Léon Gérin-Lajoie
- 1946 – W. W. Wilson
- 1947 –F. G. McGuiness
- 1948 – William Magner
- 1949 – J. F. C. Anderson
- 1950 – Norman Gosse
- 1951 – H. B. Church
- 1952 – Harold Orr
- 1953 – C. W. Burns
- 1954 – G. F Strong
- 1955 – T. C. Routley
- 1956 – Renaud Lemieux
- 1957 – M. A. R. Young
- 1958 – A. F. VanWart
- 1959 –
- 1960 –
- 1961 –
- 1962 –
- 1963 –
- 1964 –
- 1965 –
- 1966 –
- 1967 –
- 1968 –
- 1969 –
- 1970 –
- 1971 –
- 1972 –
- 1973 –
- 1974 –
- 1975 –
- 1976 –
- 1977 –
- 1978 –
- 1979 –
- 1980 –
- 1981 –
- 1982 –
- 1983 –
- 1984 –
- 1985 –
- 1986 –
- 1987 –
- 1988 –
- 1989 –
- 1990 –
- 1991 –
- 1992 –
- 1993 –
- 1994 –
- 1995 –
- 1996 –
- 1997 –
- 1998 –
- 1999 –
- 2000 –
- 2001 –
- 2002 –
- 2003 –
- 2004 –
- 2005 –
- 2006 –
- 2007 –
- 2008 –
- 2009 –
- 2010 –
- 2011 –
- 2012 –
- 2013 –
- 2014 –
- 2015 –
- 2016 –
- 2017 –
- 2018 –
- 2019 –
- 2020 –
- 2021 –
- 2022 –
- 2023 –
- 2024 –
- 2025 – Margot Burnell
- 2026 – Bolu Ogunyemi
- 2027 – Courtney Howard

== Arms ==
Coat of arms of the Canadian Medical Association
Adopted 1974 Crest A sun in splendour Or issuant from a wreath of maple leaves Gules veined Or Escutcheon Or a rod of Aesculapius entwined by a branch of maple, all within a bordure Gules charged with four fleurs-de-lis alternating with four lions’ faces Or Motto INTEGRITATE ET MISERICORDI (Latin for 'With integrity and mercy') Badge A rod of Aesculapius entwined by a branch of maple Gules ensigned by a crown rayonné Or

== See also ==
- Canadian Medical Association Journal
- Canadian Medical Protective Association
- James Thorburn: President, CMA, 1895
- List of Canadian organizations with royal patronage
