= Robert Beamish =

Canadian cardiologist

- Born: Robert Earl Beamish; September 16, 1916; Shoal Lake, Manitoba, Canada
- Died: February 17, 2001 (aged 84); Winnipeg, Manitoba, Canada
- Education: Brandon College (BA) University of Manitoba (MD)
- Occupation: Cardiologist
- Medical career
- Profession: Physician
- Awards: Queen Elizabeth II Silver Jubilee Medal; Order of Canada; Order of Manitoba

Robert Earl Beamish, CM OM (September 16, 1916 – February 17, 2001) was a Canadian physician and cardiologist.

== Early life and education ==
Beamish was born in Shoal Lake, Manitoba on September 16, 1916, the son of Henry and Mary May (McLeod) Beamish. He graduated with a B.A. from Brandon College in 1937. In 1942 he was awarded an M.D. in 1942 and two years later B. Sc. (Med.) from the University of Manitoba. From 1947 to 1948, he studied in London after being awarded a Nuffield Dominion Travelling Fellowship.

== Career ==
He served in Canada with the Royal Canadian Army Medical Corps from 1944 to 1946, retiring with the rank of captain. Upon returning to Canada, Beamish began his efforts to have the study and treatment of heart disease established as a legitimate field of medical specialty in Canada. He pioneered the idea that by lowering cholesterol the risk of heart disease was significantly lowered.

He served as a physician and cardiologist at the University of Manitoba, the Winnipeg Health Sciences Centre and the Manitoba Clinic, where he established the department of cardiology. In 1970, he joined the Great West Life Assurance Co., becoming Vice President, Underwriting and Medical. He was appointed Professor Emeritus of the University of Manitoba in 1989 and received honorary degrees from Brandon University and the University of Manitoba.

He was a Founding Director of the Manitoba Heart Foundation and served on its Medical Committee for over 30 years. He was also chairman of the Medical Advisory Committee of the Heart and Stroke Foundation of Canada from 1970 to 1972. He was President of both the Manitoba Medical Association and the Manitoba College of Physicians and Surgeons.

He is the co-author of Manitoba Medicine: A Brief History (1999, ISBN 0-88755-660-4).

In 1990 he was made a Member of the Order of Canada. In 2000 he was made a Member of the Order of Manitoba.

== Personal life and death ==
In 1943, he married Mary Kathleen Weekes. They had three daughters: Catherine (born 1949), Judith (born 1953) and Mary Anne (born 1955).

Beamish died in Winnipeg on February 17, 2001.
