= Gordon J. G. Asmundson =

Canadian psychologist

- Born: August 29, 1964 (age 62); Zweibrücken, Germany
- Education: University of Manitoba (Ph.D., 1991)
- Known for: Anxiety Disorders and Pain
- Awards: 2014 Donald O. Hebb Award; Saskatchewan Order of Merit (2020); Officer of the Order of Canada (2022)
- Scientific career
- Fields: Clinical psychology
- Workplaces: University of Regina
- Thesis: Panic attacks, anxiety sensitivity and cardiac awareness (1991)
- Doctoral advisor: Lorna Sandler

Gordon John Glenn Asmundson OC SOM FRSC (born August 29, 1964) is a Canadian psychologist and professor of psychology at the University of Regina. Asmundson is recognized for his research on anxiety, chronic pain, and posttraumatic stress, as well as for his recent work on the psychology of pandemics.

== Early life and education ==
Asmundson was born in August 1964 in Zweibrücken, Germany. He spent his childhood living on several Canadian military bases with his parents and two older siblings. Upon the completion of his Honours degree in psychology, he completed his Masters and Doctoral studies at the University of Manitoba under the supervision of Lorna Sandler and G. Ron Norton. His post-doctorate years were completed under the supervision of Murray Stein and John Walker. Throughout his graduate and post-doctorate studies he learned from his mentors the importance of concise writing.

== Career ==
In 2002, he began his first academic post at the university of Regina, where he remains today as the head of the Anxiety and Illness Behaviours Laboratory and the Psychology of Pandemics Network and maintains a small clinical practice.

Asmundson has published over 400 peer-reviewed journal articles, 73 book chapters, and 9 books. In addition to numerous awards received over the course of his career, Asmundson was inducted as a Fellow of the Royal Society of Canada (2009) – as well as the Canadian Psychological Association Donald O. Hebb Award for Distinguished Contributions to Psychology as a Science (2014), the Canadian Pain Society Distinguished Career Award (2018), the Saskatchewan Order of Merit (2020) and the Order of Canada as an Officer (2022). His graduate students are also regular recipients of prestigious awards, and five have received the CIHR Brain Star Award in the past several years.

== Areas of research ==
Recently, he has contributed to a growing body of literature regarding COVID-19-related distress; having developed a measure of COVID-19-related distress, and identifying the psychological impacts of COVID-19 among the general population.

His research has focused on anxiety disorders, traumatic stress and pain.

== Works ==
- Asmundson, G. J. G. (In Press). Comprehensive Clinical Psychology, 2nd Edition. Elsevier.
- Asmundson, G. J. G., & Afifi, T. O. (2019). Adverse childhood experiences (ACEs): Using evidence to advance research, practice, policy and prevention. Academic Press.
- Asmundson, G.J. G., Norton, G. R., & Stein, M.B. (2002). Clinical research: A practical guide. Sage.
- Asmundson, G. J. G. & Taylor, S. (2005). It's not all in your head: How worrying about your health could be making you sick and what you can do about it. New York: Guilford.
- Asmundson, G. J. G., Taylor, S., & Cox, B. J. (eds.) (2001). Health anxiety: Clinical and research perspectives on hypochondriasis and related disorders. John Wiley & Sons.
- Asmundson, G. J. G., Vlaeyen, J. W. S., & Crombez, G. (eds.) (2004). Understanding and treating fear of pain. Oxford University Press.
- Hofmann, S., & Asmundson, G. J. G. (eds.) (2017). The science of cognitive behavioral therapy. Academic Press.
- McKay, D., Abramowitz, J. S., Taylor, S., & Asmundson, G. J. G. (2009). Current perspectives on the anxiety disorders: Implications for DSM-V and beyond. New York: Springer.
- Taylor, S. & Asmundson, G. J. G. (2004). Treating health anxiety: A cognitive-behavioral approach. New York: Guilford.
- Asmundson, G. J. (2015). "The village that helped me face fear: Reflections on the training and early career experiences of the 2014 Donald O. Hebb Award recipient". Canadian Psychology, 56(1), 29.
