= Barbara Humphreys =

Canadian architect and author

- Born: October 8, 1919; Saskatchewan, Canada
- Died: February 21, 2017 (aged 97); Manotick Ontario Canada
- Education: University of Manitoba
- Occupation: Architect
- Spouse: Doug
- Children: Gwyneth

Barbara A. Humphreys (alternate, Humphreys; born in Saskatchewan) is a Canadian architect and author, specializing in public service, historic preservation, and housing.

== Life ==
Barbara Alice Humphreys was born on October 8, 1919 in Kelliher, Saskatchewan. Humphreys graduated from the University of Manitoba with a degree in architecture (1941). She worked for the Defence Industries Limited Architectural Division (Montreal), and the Plant Engineering Division of Victory Aircraft Limited (Malton. She was in private practice from 1954. In 1969, she directed a survey of Rideau Canal corridor's architectural heritage. This was a pilot project for the Canadian Inventory of Historic Buildings, and Humphreys was both its founder and chief. Humphreys retired in 1981.

== Selected works ==
- 1970, "Didsbury", Cannington Manor, Saskatchewan
- 1972, The Allen House, Yarmouth, N.S.
- 1972, Pichet House -127 rue Royal Ste. Famille, Ile d'Orleans (with Meredith H Sykes)
- 1974, Canadian historic sites : occasional papers in archaeology and history, no. 10 (with Jane E Harris; Edward F Bush; Parks Canada. National Historic Parks and Sites Branch)
- 1974, The architectural heritage of the Rideau Corridor (with Jane E Harris; Edward F Bush)
- 1979, Eversley Farm, R.R. No. 3, King City, Ontario
- 1980, The buildings of Canada : a guide to pre-20th-century styles in houses, churches and other structures (with Meredith H Sykes; Michael Middleton; Parks Canada)

== Awards ==
- 1992, Gabrielle Léger Medal (awarded to volunteers or professionals who have made an outstanding contribution to the conservation of heritage in Canada over a period of twenty years or more)

== Bibliography ==
- Adams, Annmarie; Tancred, Peta (2000). Designing Women: Gender and the Architectural Profession. University of Toronto Press. ISBN 978-0-8020-8219-0.
- Cameron, Christina (1989). Charles BaillairgŽ: Architect and Engineer. McGill-Queen's Press - MQUP. ISBN 978-0-7735-0638-1.
- Peter Martin Associates (1999). Canadian Book Review Annual. Peter Martin Associates. ISBN 9780968242131.
