= Victor Anonsen =

Canadian artist and football player (born 1954)

Victor Anonsen (born May 19, 1954) is a Canadian artist and former professional football player, born in Moose Jaw, who played in the Canadian Football League as a wide receiver.

A graduate of the University of Manitoba, in 1978 he played three games with the Calgary Stampeders and two regular season games and three play-off games - including the Grey Cup - with the Montreal Alouettes. In 1979 he played 12 games with the Toronto Argonauts and two with the Winnipeg Blue Bombers. Anonsen caught 8 passes for 115 yards in his career. He is now an artist in Victoria, British Columbia.
