= Donna Giberson =

Donna J. Giberson
- Born: Canada
- Education: University of Calgary; University of Manitoba
- Scientific career
- Fields: Entomology; Dipterology
- Workplaces: University of Prince Edward Island

Donna Giberson is a Canadian freshwater ecologist whose work focused on the Maritimes and Canadian Arctic. She conducted research on the life history, diversity, and habitat usage of aquatic insects as well as the effects of anthropogenic and natural disturbances on streams. Giberson also has an interest in the role of volunteers and citizen scienctists in entomology and science more broadly.

== Career ==
Giberson obtained her PhD from the University of Manitoba in 1991. She spent one year as an NSERC post-doctoral Fellow and sessional lecturer at Mount Allison University. Then, she spent 25 years as faculty at the University of Prince Edward Island, before retiring. While working at the University of Prince Edward Island, Giberson studied the species composition and distribution of mosquitoes on the island extensively.

Giberson is a fellow of the Entomological Society of Canada. She also has played several roles for the Biological Survey of Canada including as secretary, newsletter editor, and director. She is also the author of the Mayfly Newsletter, the newsletter of the Permanent Committee of the International Conferences on Ephemeroptera. Giberson has also played

== Awards and recognitions ==
In 2022 Giberson was recognized with the Entomological Society of Canada Gold Medal, which recognizes outstanding achievement in Canadian entomology. Giberson has also been recognized with several awards from the University of Prince Edward Island including the Presidential Merit Award for Teaching, the MacLauchlan Prize for Effective Writing, and the Award for Scholarly Achievement (twice).

== Bibliography ==
Giberson has published nearly 50 peer-reviewed articles and book chapters, over 40 reports and other articles, and contributed to 8 books and identification guides, mostly on aquatic insects.

=== Selected works ===
- Giberson, Donna J. Species composition, distribution, and seasonal patterns of dragonflies and damselflies of Prince Edward Island National Park. Prince Edward Island National Park, 2003.
