= CMA Code of Ethics and Professionalism =

The CMA Code of Ethics and Professionalism (Code) is a document produced by the Canadian Medical Association. The Code articulates the ethical and professional commitments and responsibilities of the medical profession in Canada.

== History ==
The CMA Code of Ethics was first published in 1868, and as recently as 2015 was considered by the CMA to be "arguably the most important document produced by the CMA. It has a long and distinguished history of providing ethical guidance to Canada's physicians. Focus areas include decision-making, consent, privacy, confidentiality, research and physician responsibilities. The code is updated every 5-6 years and has a major revision approximately every 20 years. Changes must be approved by CMA General Council."

On 15 October 1996, the CMA Board of Directors approved a document entitled Code of Ethics of the Canadian Medical Association, which contained a Preface, and 43 enumerated points in sections entitled: General Responsibilities; Responsibilities to the Patient; Responsibilities to Society; Responsibilities to the Profession; and Responsibilities to Oneself.

The CMA Code of Ethics was updated in 2004. This document, which was in force at least until March 2015 was composed of four double-column pages and had 54 enumerated points in the section heads identified in 1996.

The code was once again revised and published in December 2018.

In March 2019, the College of Physicians & Surgeons of Newfoundland and Labrador adopted the CMA Code "in accordance with the College's By-Law 5: Code of Ethics".

== 2018 Synopsis ==
As of December 2018, the Code document is seven pages long and organized into three alphabetically itemized sections. Section C is by far the longest, and contains 44 numerically itemized paragraphs.

=== Section A ===
Section A, entitled VIRTUES EXEMPLIFIED BY THE ETHICAL PHYSICIAN, is concerned with five virtues that the medical profession should strive to embody:

- compassion,
- honesty,
- humility,
- integrity and
- prudence.

=== Section B ===
Section B, entitled FUNDAMENTAL COMMITMENTS OF THE MEDICAL PROFESSION, documents:

- Commitment to the well-being of the patient
- Commitment to respect for persons
- Commitment to professional integrity and competence
- Commitment to professional excellence
- Commitment to self-care and peer support
- Commitment to inquiry and reflection

=== Section C ===
Section C entitled PROFESSIONAL RESPONSIBILITIES documents:

- Patient–physician relationship
- Decision-making
- Patient privacy and the duty of confidentiality
- Managing and minimizing conflicts of interest
