= Henry Beaumont Small =

Canadian civil servant and Naturalist (1831 - 1919)

H. Beaumont Small (1831–1919) was a Canadian civil servant and an early naturalist who authored a number of books on forestry, minerals, animals, botany, and tourism.

== Life ==
Born in Market Bosworth, Leicestershire, England on October 31, 1831, he was the son of the Rev. Nathaniel Pomfret Small and Catherine Lee. He was born after his mother was gored by a bull. She died one hour after delivering her son.

Receiving his first degree from King's College London in 1850, he went on to attend Lincoln College, Oxford, graduating in 1853. Seeing the opportunities Canada offered in the field of Natural History, he emigrated there shortly after obtaining his degrees.

He later relocated to the United States to become a Classical Professor at a military college in what today is Ossining, New York. After spending two years in this capacity, he continued on in the U.S. being a private tutor for a time in New York, and then serving in the United States Sanitary Commission in Virginia during the American Civil War.

About the time his first book was published in 1865, he returned to Canada and entered into civil service. In 1868, he joined the Marine and Fisheries Department shortly after its formation. In 1870 he was appointed private secretary to the Hon. Christopher Dunkin, Minister of Agriculture. After Dunkin resigned as Minister in 1871, H. Beaumont Small went on to hold various appointments within the Department of Agriculture, eventually being appointed Secretary of Agriculture in 1889.

Personally, H. Beaumont Small married Henrietta Falle on June 20, 1853, and the couple had five children, including their eldest son, Dr. Henry Beaumont Small.

H. Beaumont Small died on February 6, 1919, in Bermuda and is buried there.

== Partial listing of published works ==
- Animals of North America, Mammals (1864)
- Animals of North America, Fresh Water Fish (1865)
- The Canadian Handbook and Tourist's Guide, Etc. (1886); republished in 2010.
- The Products and Manufactures of the New Dominion (1868)
- Chronicles of Canada (1868)
- The Mineral Resources of the New Dominion (1868)
- Resources of the Ottawa Valley (1872)
- Mineral Resources of Canada (1880)
- Forest Trees, Timber and Forest Products (1884)
- Guide Book for Intended Settlers (1885)
- Industries and Manufacturers (1885)
- Canada – Its Extent and Resources (1886)
- Coinage and Money (1890)
- My Aquarium (1893)
- Two Canadian Ship Canal Routes (1897)
- Botany of the Bermudas (1900)
- Mushroom Poisoning (1900)
- Medical Memoirs of Bytown (1903)
