= Gordon S. Fahrni =

Canadian physician (1887–1995)

Gordon Samuel Fahrni
- Born: April 13, 1887; Gladstone, Manitoba
- Died: November 3, 1995 (aged 108); Vancouver, British Columbia

Gordon Samuel Fahrni, (April 13, 1887 – November 3, 1995) a recipient of the Order of Canada, was a Canadian physician and a leader in the Canadian Medical community. He served as president of the Canadian Medical Association from 1941 to 1942. An expert on goitre surgery, he was a founder of the American Goitre Association. He was a medical practitioner for 54 years, dying at age 108.

== Early years ==
Fahrni was one of six children born in Gladstone, Manitoba to Christian Fahrni and Priscilla Hyndman.

== Biography ==
Gordon Fahrni graduated from the University of Manitoba in 1911 and ultimately became one of the leaders in the Canadian Medical community. In 1921 he helped to organize a campaign to save the debt-ridden Canadian Medical Association, then served as president of the Canadian Medical Association from 1941 to 1942. Fahrni was also the founder of the American Goitre Association, and became its president in 1928. He was acknowledged as an expert on goitre surgery in North America, and was also well known as a military physician. He was instrumental in the establishment of the Medical Procurement and Assignment Board for the Royal Canadian Military which helped balance medical services for servicemen abroad and civilians at home. Fahrni retired from the medical practice in 1965 after being a medical practitioner for 54 years. In 1976, Queenston House published Gordon's autobiography, "Prairie Surgeon".

== Personal life and legacy ==
Gordon Fahrni was an avid outdoorsman and golfer. On his 100th birthday, he was featured in the Score golf magazine. When he died in 1995 at the age of 108, Fahrni was Canada's longest-lived physician.

Fahrni was part of a family that produced other accomplished physicians: his son, Dr. Gordon Fahrni of Winnipeg and nephews, Dr. Brock Fahrni and Dr. Harry Fahrni. Founding director of UBC's School of Rehabilitation, Dr. Brock Fahrni was a specialist in internal medicine and a pioneer in gerontology research. Orthopaedic surgeon Dr. Walter Harrison Fahrni, (Dr. W. H. Fahrni) pioneered a non-surgical approach for the treatment of dislocated discs.
