= Harry Medovy =

Canadian pediatrician (1904–1995)

Harry Medovy, OC (October 22, 1904 – October 10, 1995) was a Canadian pediatrician and academic.

Born in the Russian Empire, his parents moved to Winnipeg, Manitoba when Medovy was one to escape persecution against Jews. He studied at the University of Manitoba receiving a Bachelor of Arts degree in 1923 and a Doctor of Medicine in 1928. During World War II, he served with the Royal Canadian Army Medical Corps. In 1932, he joined the Faculty of Medicine of the University of Manitoba and was department head from 1954 to 1970. In 1954, he was appointed head of the Department of Pediatrics and Pediatrician-in-Chief of the Children's Hospital of Winnipeg.

He was active in preventing children from smoking, in making people aware of the risks from children poisoning themselves with household products, in advocating the addition of vitamins C and D to milk, and warning people of the dangers of nitrates in shallow wells. He was also in charge of rapidly spreading the newly created Polio Vaccine to children throughout Winnipeg. He was one of the first doctors to recommend putting fluoride in the city's water, greatly improving the health of teeth for people throughout Winnipeg.

In 1979, his book A vision fulfilled: the story of the Children's Hospital of Winnipeg 1909-1973 was published.

In 1990, he was made an Officer of the Order of Canada. In 1975, he received an honorary Doctor of Science degree from the University of Manitoba. In 1980, he was awarded the Canadian Paediatric Society's Alan Ross Award, "recogniz[ing] lifelong excellence in the fields of paediatric research, education, healthcare and advocacy".

He died in Winnipeg in 1995.
