= Doctors Manitoba =

Canadian trade union and professional association

- Manitoba Medical Association
- Formation: 1908
- Type: Trade union; professional association
- Headquarters: Winnipeg, Manitoba, Canada
- Location: Manitoba, Canada
- Members: 3,781 (2018)
- President: Alon Altman
- Chief executive officer: Theresa Oswald
- Affiliations: Canadian Medical Association
- Website: doctorsmanitoba.ca

The Manitoba Medical Association (MMA), operating as Doctors Manitoba since 2008, is the trade union and professional association for physicians in Manitoba. Under Manitoba's Health Services Insurance Act, the association is recognized in agreements with the provincial government on physician fee schedules and methods of payment for insured medical services. As of December 2018, Doctors Manitoba had 3,781 members.

== History ==
The association's roots date to 22 May 1890, when the Provincial Medical Association of Manitoba was formed as a local branch of the British Medical Association. The Manitoba Medical Association was formally founded in 1908 to represent licensed physicians in the province. In 2008, the organization adopted the name Doctors Manitoba.

== Role in Manitoba health policy ==
Section 74 of Manitoba's Health Services Insurance Act authorizes the Manitoba Medical Association, through its officers, to enter into agreements with the provincial minister on medical fee schedules, related terms and conditions, and methods of payment for insured medical services. Manitoba law also defines a "medical review committee" as a body established under an agreement made under section 76 of that act.

Under The Manitoba Medical Association Dues Act, member physicians must pay annual dues and non-member physicians must pay an equivalent amount, excluding the portion attributable to membership in the Canadian Medical Association. The same act authorizes the deduction of those amounts from certain payments made to non-member physicians under provincial health-payment arrangements.

In 1982, during a dispute over binding arbitration in fee schedule negotiations with the provincial government, the association organized a rotating work stoppage by physicians in western Manitoba.

== Public positions ==
The association has also taken positions on broader public-health issues. In 2008, its president, Darcy Johnson, publicly supported legislation to protect children from second-hand smoke in vehicles.

Writing in the Winnipeg Free Press in 2022, the historian Allan Levine cited warnings by the Manitoba Medical Association in 1969 about a doctor shortage and by its anesthesia section in 1978 about a looming manpower crisis as examples of the body's recurring role in debate over Manitoba's health-care system.
