= Judie Alimonti =

Canadian immunologist (1960–2017)

Judie Barbara Alimonti (1960–2017) was a Canadian immunologist known for her research on the RVSV-ZEBOV Ebola vaccine.

== Early life ==
In 1991, Alimonti received a Bachelor of Science degree in microbiology from the University of British Columbia. She later earned a PhD in immunology from the University of Manitoba. Alimonti managed the Canadian testing of a human-grade Ebola vaccine at the National Microbiology Laboratory in Winnipeg, Manitoba. When Ebola research at the lab began to founder, Alimonti set up a Skunkworks project within the lab to continue the research. Alimonti was employed as a contract scientist at the lab and left their employment in 2015.

Alimonti died of cancer in December 2017 in Ottawa.
