= Barry Posner (physician) =

Canadian physician, research scientist and Professor

Barry Innis Posner
- Born: November 7, 1937 (age 88); Winnipeg, Manitoba, Canada
- Education: University of Manitoba (MD)
- Awards: Order of Canada
- Scientific career
- Workplaces: McGill University

Barry Innis Posner, OC CQ FRSC (born November 7, 1937) is a Canadian physician, research scientist and Professor Emeritus in the Departments of Medicine and Anatomy & Cell Biology at McGill University, where he also managed the Polypeptide and Protein Hormone Laboratory.

== Biography ==
Born in Winnipeg, Manitoba, he received his Doctor of Medicine degree from the University of Manitoba in 1961. A gold medalist in his graduating class, Posner pursued post-graduate work at the Massachusetts Institute of Technology and the National Institutes of Health in Bethesda, Maryland before joining the Royal Victoria Hospital and the McGill University Faculty of Medicine in 1970 as an assistant professor. He was appointed to the ranks of Associate Professor in 1975 and Professor in 1979. He was the Director of the Polypeptide Hormone Laboratory at McGill University and a Professor in the Department of Medicine and the Department of Anatomy and Cell Biology, as well as senior physician at the Royal Victoria Hospital. He has served as Director of the McGill Endocrine training program and physician-in-chief at the Sir Mortimer B. Davis Jewish General Hospital from 1996 to 2002.

== Research ==
His fundamental research on insulin signaling led to the discovery of the endosomal system and the view that this is a central site for both initiating and regulating signal transduction. In the late 1980s, he discovered the peroxovanadium compounds as potent insulin mimetics; and in elucidating their mechanism of action, he defined the key role of phosphotyrosine phosphatases in regulating receptor tyrosine kinases. His group went on to define the role of lipid rafts as sites of intense signaling at both the cell surface and within endosomes. More recently Posner's diabetes research focused on the genes responsible for diabetes, the discovery of which will aid in the prediction and treatment of this disease.

== Publications and scholarly activities ==
He has published over 290 scientific manuscripts, and, as a Visiting Professor, has delivered numerous prestigious lectures including the Banting and Best Memorial Lecture of the International Diabetes Federation (1991), the Pfizer Lectures at Harvard University (1993), the Joe Doupe Memorial Lecture at the University of Manitoba (1994), the Novartis lecture of the Canadian Society of Endocrinology and Metabolism (1997), the David M. Kovitz Memorial Lecture at the University of Calgary (2000), the 2nd John & Mary Davidson Lecture (and Award) of the University of Toronto in 2002, and the Volpe Distinguished Service Award of the Canadian Society of Endocrinology and Metabolism (2008).

== Recognition and awards ==
His academic contributions have been recognized by election to the Association of American Physicians (1988), receipt of the Distinguished Scientist Award of the CSCI (1991), election to Fellowship in the Royal Society of Canada, appointment as Officer of the Order of Canada (1999), and receipt of the Queen's Golden Jubilee Medal (2002). In 2014, he was made a Knight of the National Order of Quebec; and in 2015 received the Lifetime Achievement Award of the Canadian Diabetes Association. On his retirement from McGill in 2019 he was awarded the McGill Medal for outstanding academic achievement.
