= Alison Norlen =

Canadian artist (born 1962)

- Born: September 21, 1962 (age 64); Winnipeg, Manitoba, Canada
- Education: University of Manitoba, Yale University
- Known for: graphic artist, sculptor, installation artist

Alison Norlen (born 1962, Winnipeg, Manitoba) is a visual artist who is known for large-scale drawing and sculpture installation. Her work is in private collections across the United States and Canada and in the public collections of the National Gallery of Canada, The Mackenzie Art Gallery, the Confederation Centre Art Gallery, The Rooms Provincial Art Gallery, the Winnipeg Art Gallery, the Mendel Art Gallery, the Manitoba Art Council, The Canada Council Art Bank, and the Saskatchewan Arts Board.

== Life and education ==
Norlen grew up in Kenora, Ontario. She received a Bachelor of Fine Arts degree (Honours, First Class) from the School of Art at the University of Manitoba in 1987 and a Master of Fine Arts from Yale University in New Haven, Connecticut, in 1989. Before beginning her career as a visual artist she trained as a barber.

== Career ==
Inspired by built spectacles such as West Edmonton Mall, Disneyland, Universal Studios, Las Vegas, roadside attractions, circuses and carnival celebrations, her work is characterized by its grand scale and intricate detail. Her work is significantly influenced by theater and film, particularly the work of the Depression-era film and theatrical choreographer Busby Berkeley.

Alison Norlen is currently a professor of painting and drawing at the University of Saskatchewan in the faculty of Art & Art History. She was awarded the University of Saskatchewan College of Arts and Science Teaching Excellence Award in 2011.

== Solo exhibitions ==
Year	Name	Gallery	Location
2013	Luna	Mendel Art Gallery	Saskatoon, SK
2012	glimmer	Two Rivers Gallery	Prince George, BC
2011	Metro Lines	Place Des Arts	Montreal QC
2011	glimmer	Esplanade Art Gallery	Medicine Hat, AB
2010	armature	ARCH 2 Gallery, Faculty of Architecture, University of Manitoba	Winnipeg, MB
2010	glimmer	Thunder Bay Art Gallery	Thunder Bay, ON
2009	glimmer	Kenderdine Gallery	Saskatoon SK
2008	Roller Coaster	Simon Fraser University Gallery	Burnaby, BC
2007	Edifice	Kitchener-Waterloo Art Gallery	Kitchener, ON
2006	Alison Norlen	Harbourfront Centre	Toronto, ON
2005	Mirage	The Art Gallery of Regina	Regina, SK
2005	Alison Norlen	Anna Leonowens Gallery	Halifax, NS
2004	Studio Series,	MacKenzie Art Gallery	Regina, SK
2004	Float	Art Gallery of Swift Current	Swift Current, SK
2004	ala	Oboro	Montreal, QC
2003	Float	Kelowna Art Gallery	Kelowna, BC
2003	Float	Confederation Centre of the Arts	Charlottetown, PEI
2002	A Parade...	Stride Gallery	Calgary, AB
2002	Float	Mendel Art Gallery	Saskatoon, SK
2002	Alison Norlen	Plug In ICA	Winnipeg, MB
2002	Art Pages	Border Crossings magazine (Artist Project)	Winnipeg, MB
2001	Alison Norlen	Lake of the Woods Museum	Kenora, ON
1999	Alison Norlen	ARCH 2 Gallery, Faculty of Architecture, University of Manitoba	Winnipeg, MB
1998	Pinball Drawings	Richard Heller Gallery	Los Angeles, USA
1998	Pinball	Yukon Arts Centre	Whitehorse, YT
1997	Manitoba Studio Series	Winnipeg Art Gallery	Winnipeg, MB
1993	Hyperbole	The Art Gallery of Southwestern Manitoba	Brandon, MB
1991	New Work	Ace Art Gallery	Winnipeg, MB

== Select group exhibitions ==
- MosaiCanada: Sign & Sound, Seoul Korea (2003)
- Inklinations, York Quay, Toronto (2003).
- In My Solitude, Manny Neubacher Gallery, Toronto (2003).
- Occur/Blur, Winnipeg Art Gallery, Winnipeg (2003).
- Tekeningen III, Quartair Art Contemporary Art Initiatives Dutch/Canada, Den Haag, Holland (2002).
- Figment, Two Rivers Gallery, Prince George (2002).
- After the Grain Elevator: Re-imaging the Prairie Icon, Art Gallery of Prince Albert (Oct 13 - Nov 26, 2000).
