= Tracie O. Afifi =

Canadian research scientist

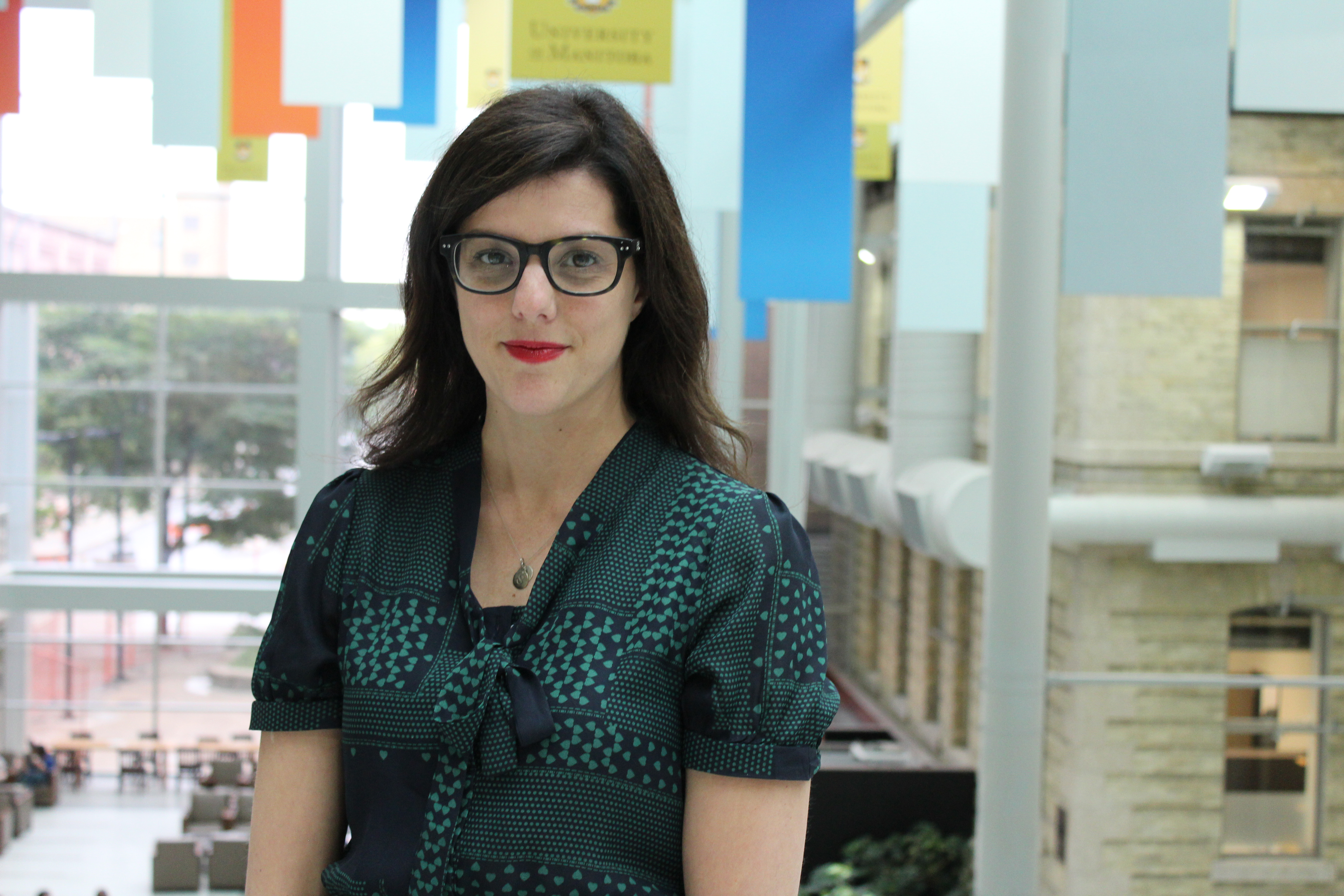
- Afifi in 2017

Academic background
- Education: BSc, 1999, MSc, 2003, PhD, 2009, University of Manitoba
- Thesis: Problem gambling among women in Canada (2009)

Academic work
- Institutions: University of Manitoba

Tracie O. Afifi is a Canadian research scientist. She is a Full professor in the Rady Faculty of Health Sciences and a Tier 1 Canada Research Chair at the University of Manitoba.

== Early life and education ==
Afifi completed her Bachelor of Science degree in 1999 at the University of Manitoba and remained at the institution for her Master of Science and PhD.

== Career ==
Following her PhD, Afifi joined the faculty at the University of Manitoba as an assistant professor of community health sciences. Throughout her tenure at the institution, Afifi focused her research on public health approaches to understanding how the experiences of child maltreatment and problem gambling are associated with negative mental and physical health outcomes. As an assistant professor, she oversaw the first nationally representative study on child abuse and mental disorders in Canada. In order to achieve this, her research team examined data from Canadians who had participated in the 2012 Canadian Community Health Survey on Mental Health. Afifi's research into childhood abuse was later recognized by the Canadian Coalition for the Rights of Children as the chosen recipient of their 2014 Children's Rights Supporter Award. In 2015, she received an Rh Award for Outstanding Contributions to Scholarship and Research in the Health Sciences category through the Winnipeg Rh Institute Foundation.

As a result of her overall research, Afifi was recognised by the Canadian Broadcasting Corporation in 2016 as one of Manitoba's "new crop of leaders, movers and shakers under the age of 40." She was specifically recognized for her community advocacy and investment in public training and education on child maltreatment. The following year, Afifi was inducted into the Royal Society of Canada's College of New Scholars, Artists and Scientists as an emerging and productive academic. In 2018, Afifi was awarded the Royal Mach-Gaensslen Prize for Mental Health Research for being "one of the most promising, rising-star mental health researchers in Canada" in order to help fund her research into identifying protective factors that help to prevent child maltreatment and improve mental health. She also received the 2018 Canadian Institutes of Health Research Gold Leaf Prize for Outstanding Achievements by an Early Career Investigator.

In 2019, Afifi was appointed a Tier 1 Canada Research Chair in Childhood Adversity and Resilience. In this role, she received the 2020 Alexander Leighton Award in Psychiatric Epidemiology as a person who has "contributed significantly to the advancement of Canadian psychiatric epidemiology through innovative studies, methods development, teaching or knowledge transfer." During the COVID-19 pandemic, Afifi studied vaccine hesitancy and co-authored a journal article with suggestions to improve vaccine uptake in younger people. In October 2021, Afifi was named one of the Top 100 Most Powerful Women in Canada for 2021. In 2023, Tracie Afifi was award the University of Manitoba Distinguished Alumni Award in the category of Academic Innovation.
