= Doctors of BC =

Canadian provincial professional association

- Formation: January 1, 1900; 126 years ago
- Type: Professional Association
- Legal status: Physician association
- Headquarters: Vancouver, British Columbia, Canada
- Location(s): 115 — 1665 West Broadway; Vancouver, British Columbia V6J 5A4; Canada
- Region served: British Columbia, Canada
- Members: approx 18,000 physicians, residents and medical students
- President: Adam Thompson
- CEO: Anthony Knight
- President-elect: Baldev Sanghera
- Parent organization: Canadian Medical Association
- Website: www.doctorsofbc.ca
- Formerly called: British Columbia Medical Association

Doctors of BC is the provincial medical association for British Columbia. It represents physicians, medical residents, and medical students in the province and participates in formal negotiations with the Government of British Columbia through the Physician Main Agreement. Doctors of BC represents physicians in negotiations with the BC government and it partners with the province on the Joint Collaborative Committees which are designed to improve the health care system with the goal of providing quality patient care.

== Governance ==
Doctors of BC uses a dual structure with a Representative Assembly and a Board of Directors. The Representative Assembly provides broad member representation. The Board carries legal and fiduciary responsibilities for the association, while the CEO oversees operations.

== History ==
Doctors of BC was founded in January 1900 as the BC Medical Association with Dr R.E. McKechnie, a surgeon from Nanaimo, as President. In 2014 the association adopted the public brand Doctors of BC. In 2025 the association marked 125 years since its formation.

== Publications ==
British Columbia Medical Journal

The British Columbia Medical Journal is a peer-reviewed general medical journal covering scientific research, review articles, and updates on contemporary clinical practices written by British Columbian physicians or focused on topics likely to be of interest to them. It is funded through Doctors of BC is editorially independent. It is published 10 times per year.

== Arms ==
Coat of arms of Doctors of BC

Notes
Granted 28 March 1991
Crest
A demi-griffin Or armed and langued Azure resting its dexter claw upon an ankh Sable.
Escutcheon
Or on a pale between two maple leaves Gules each charged with a dogwood flower Argent seeded Or a ducal coronet Or enfiled by a rod of Aesculapius Or tipped with a dogwood flower as on the leaves.
Supporters
On a grassy mound rising from barry wavy Azure and Argent on either side a griffin Gules armed and langued Azure each charged upon the shoulder with a fleam Or.
Badge
A rod of Aesculapius Or surmounted by a dogwood flower Argent seeded Or.

== See also ==
- Canadian Medical Association
