= Noura =

Noura is an Arabic-origin female given name and a surname, derived from the name Noor, meaning "light". People with the name include:

== Given name ==
- Noura (singer), Algerian singer
- Noura Al Jasmi (born 2002), Emirati beauty queen; Miss Earth UAE 2024
- Noura Aljizawi, Syrian political activist
- Noura Alktebi, Emirati paralympic athlete
- Noura Bensaad, Tunisian writer
- Noura Borsali, (1953–2017), Tunisian academic and journalist
- Noura Elsayed (born 1987), Egyptian middle-distance runner
- Noura Erakat (born 1980), Palestinian American legal scholar, human rights attorney, and assistant professor
- Noura Ghazi (born 1981), Syrian lawyer
- Noura Hashemi (born 1983), Iranian actress
- Noura Hussein, Sudanese teenager sentenced to death for killing her rapist
- Noora Salem Jasim (born 1996), Nigerian-born Bahraini athlete
- Noura Al Kaabi, Emirati government minister and businesswoman
- Noura Mana (born 1997), Moroccan swimmer
- Noura Mohamed (born 1998), Egyptian fencer
- Noura Nasri, Tunisian sport shooter
- Noura al Noman, Emirati science fiction writer
- Noura Qadry (born 1954), Egyptian actress
- Noura Rahal (born 1973), Lebanese/Syrian singer
- Noura Mohamed Saleh (born 1989), Emirati chess player
- Noura bint Abdul Rahman Al Saud (1875–1950), Saudi royal
- Noura bint Faisal Al Saud (born 1988), Saudi royal
- Noura bint Mohammed Al Saud, Saudi royal and jewelry designer
- Noura bint Sultan Al Saud, Saudi royal
- Noura Mint Seymali, Mauritanian griot, singer, songwriter, and instrumentalist
- Noura Ben Slama (born 1985), Tunisian handball player
- Noura Khalifa Al Suwaidi, Emirati politician
- Noura Ziadi, Canadian research scientist

== Surname ==
- Mouloud Noura (born 1982), Algerian paralympic judoka

== In fiction ==
- Heather Raffo's play and titular character Noura
