= Physicians in Canada =

Canadian physician

Physician
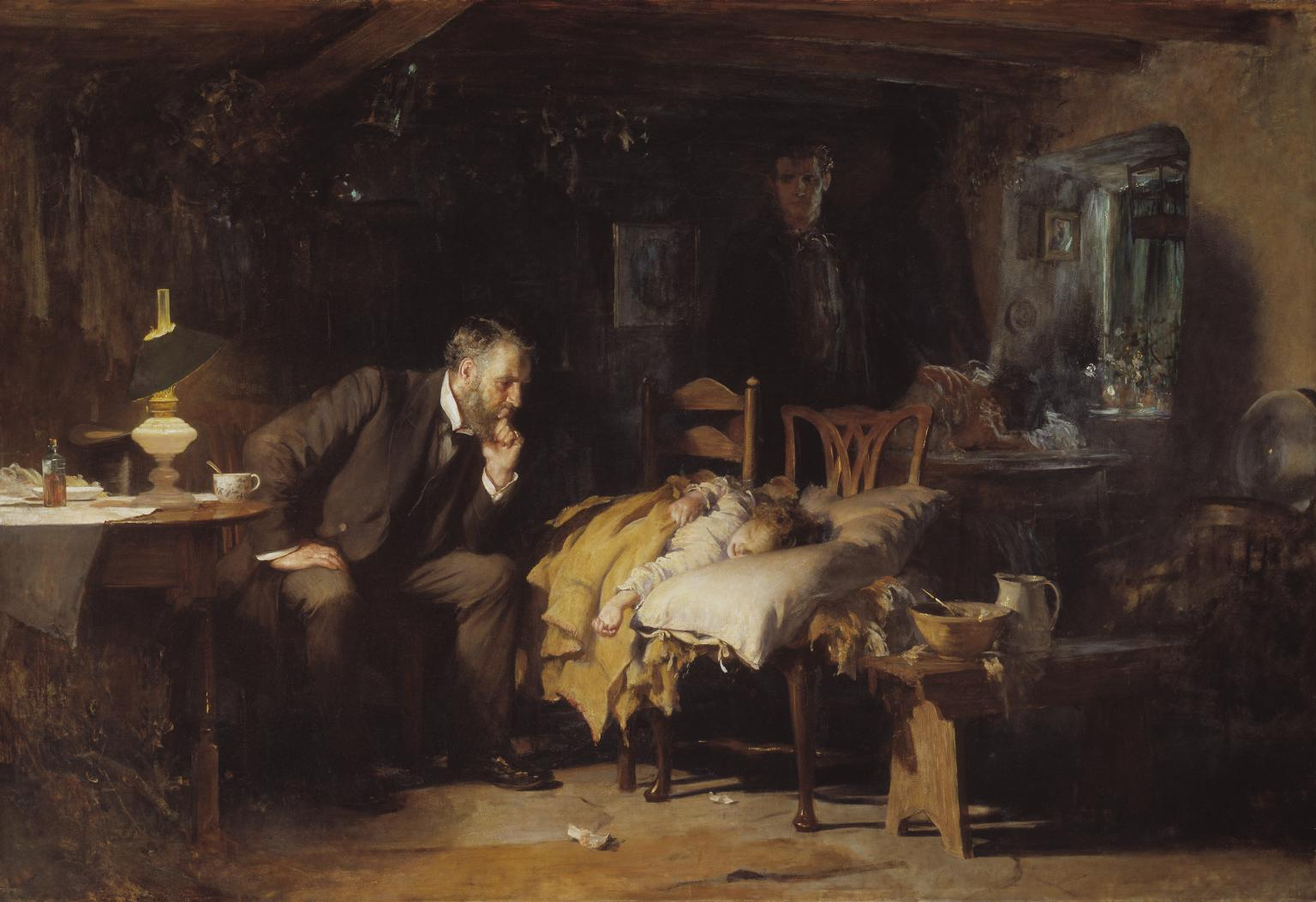
- The Doctor by Luke Fildes (detail)

Occupation
- Names: Physician, medical practitioner, medical doctor or simply doctor
- Occupation type: Professional
- Activity sectors: Medicine, health care

Description
- Competencies: The ethics, art and science of medicine, analytical skills, critical thinking
- Education required: MBBS, MD, MDCM, or DO
- Fields of employment: Clinics, hospitals, government
- Related jobs: General practitioner Family physician Surgeon; Specialist physician

Physicians and surgeons play an important role in the provision of health care in Canada. They are responsible for the promotion, maintenance, and restoration of health through the study, diagnosis, prognosis, and treatment of disease, injury, and other physical and mental impairments. As Canadian medical schools solely offer the Doctor of Medicine (M.D.) or Doctor of Medicine and Master of Surgery (M.D., C.M.) degrees, these represent the degrees held by the vast majority of physicians and surgeons in Canada, though some have a Doctor of Osteopathic Medicine (D.O.) from the United States or Bachelor of Medicine, Bachelor of Surgery (M.B.B.S.) from the commonwealth countries and Europe.

In order to practice in a Canadian province or territory, physicians and surgeons must obtain certification from either the College of Family Physicians of Canada (CFPC) or the Royal College of Physicians and Surgeons of Canada (RCPSC), as well as become members of the provincial or territorial medical professional regulatory authority.

== History ==
Hospitals were initially places which cared for the poor as those with higher socioeconomic status were cared for at home. In Quebec during the 18th century, a series of charitable institutions, many set up by Catholic religious orders, provided such care.

The first medical schools were established in Lower Canada in the 1820s. These included the Montreal Medical Institution, which is the McGill University Faculty of Medicine today. In the mid-1870s, Sir William Osler changed the face of medical school instruction with the introduction of the hands-on approach. The College of Physicians and Surgeons of Upper Canada was established in 1839, and in 1869, it was permanently incorporated. In 1834, William Kelly, a surgeon with the Royal Navy, introduced the idea of preventing the spread of disease via sanitation measures following epidemics of cholera. In 1892, Dr. William Osler wrote the landmark text The Principles and Practice of Medicine, which dominated medical instruction in the West for the following half century. Around this time, a movement began that called for the improved healthcare for the poor, focusing mainly on sanitation and hygiene. This period saw important advances including the provision of safe drinking water to most of the population, public baths and beaches, and municipal garbage services to remove waste from the city. During this period, medical care was severely lacking for the poor and minorities such as First Nations.

=== Women in medicine in Canada ===
In the late nineteenth and early twentieth centuries, women made inroads into various professions including teaching, journalism, social work, and public health. In 1871, female physicians Emily Howard Stowe and Jennie Kidd Trout won the right for women to be admitted to medical schools and were granted licences from the College of Physicians and Surgeons of Ontario. In 1883, Emily Stowe led the creation of the Ontario Medical College for Women, affiliated with the University of Toronto. These advances included the establishment of a Women's Medical College in Toronto, as well as in Kingston, Ontario. Stowe's daughter, Augusta Stowe-Gullen, became the first woman to graduate from a Canadian medical school.

== Canadian healthcare system ==
Healthcare in Canada is delivered through thirteen provincial and territorial systems of publicly funded health care, informally called Medicare. It is guided by the provisions of the Canada Health Act of 1984. The government ensures the quality of care through federal standards. The government does not participate in day-to-day care or collect any information about an individual's health, which remains confidential as per the doctor-patient relationship. Canada's provincially based Medicare systems are cost-effective because of their administrative simplicity. In each province, each doctor handles the insurance claim against the provincial insurer. There is no need for the person who accesses healthcare to be involved in billing and reclaim. Private health expenditure accounts for about 30% of health care financing. The Canada Health Act does not cover prescription drugs, home care or long-term care, or dental care, which implies that most Canadians rely on private insurance from their employers or the government to pay for the costs associated with these services. Provinces provide partial coverage for children, those living in poverty, and seniors. Programs vary by province.

Canada has a ratio of practising physicians to population that is below the OECD average.

In 2018-2019, the average gross payment per physician reached $347,000 a year. Alberta had the highest average salary of around $230,000, while Quebec had the lowest average annual salary at $165,000, arguably creating inter-provincial competition for doctors and contributing to local shortages at the time. In 2018, to draw attention to the work of nurses and the declining level of service provided to patients, more than 700 physicians, residents, and medical students in Quebec signed an online petition asking for their pay raises to be canceled.

In 1991, the Ontario Medical Association agreed to become a province-wide closed shop, making the OMA union a monopoly. Critics argue that this measure has restricted the supply of doctors to guarantee its members' incomes. In 2008, the Ontario Medical Association and the Ontario government agreed to a four-year contract with a 12.25% doctors' pay raise, which was expected to cost Ontarians an extra $1 billion. Ontario's then-premier Dalton McGuinty said, "One of the things that we've got to do, of course, is ensure that we're competitive ... to attract and keep doctors here in Ontario...".

In December 2008, the Society of Obstetricians and Gynaecologists of Canada reported a critical shortage of obstetricians and gynecologists. The report stated that 1,370 obstetricians were practising in Canada and that number is expected to fall by at least one-third within five years. The society is asking the government to increase the number of residency positions obstetrics and gynecology by 30 percent a year for three years and also recommended rotating placements of doctors into smaller communities to encourage them to take up residence there.

Each province regulates its medical profession through a self-governing regulatory body, which is responsible for licensing physicians, setting practice standards, and investigating and disciplining its members.

The national doctors association is called the Canadian Medical Association; it describes its mission as "To serve and unite the physicians of Canada and be the national advocate, in partnership with the people of Canada, for the highest standards of health and health care." Because healthcare is deemed to be under provincial/territorial jurisdiction, negotiations on behalf of physicians are conducted by provincial associations such as the Ontario Medical Association. The views of Canadian doctors have been mixed, particularly in their support for allowing parallel private financing. The history of Canadian physicians in the development of Medicare has been described by David Naylor. Since the passage of the 1984 Canada Health Act, the CMA itself has been a strong advocate of maintaining a strong publicly funded system, including lobbying the federal government to increase funding, and being a founding member of (and active participant in) the Health Action Lobby (HEAL).

However, internal disputes may occur. In particular, some provincial medical associations have argued for permitting a larger private role. To some extent, this has been a reaction to strong cost control; CIHI estimates that 99% of physician expenditures in Canada come from public sector sources, and physicians—particularly those providing elective procedures who have been squeezed for operating room time—have accordingly looked for alternative revenue sources. One indication came in August 2007 when the CMA elected as president Dr. Brian Day of British Columbia, who owns the largest private hospital in Canada and vocally supports increasing private healthcare in Canada. The CMA presidency rotates among the provinces, with the provincial association electing a candidate who is customarily ratified by the CMA general meeting. Day's selection was sufficiently controversial that he was challenged—albeit unsuccessfully—by another physician member.

== Demographics ==
According to the Canadian Institute for Health Information, in 2023, Canada had a total of 97,384 physicians, translating to approximately 243 physicians per 100,000 population. The physician workforce consisted of 54% male and 46% female practitioners. The average age of physicians in 2023 was 49.3 years — 51.7 for males versus 46.4 for females. Among family physicians, 50.4% were female, reflecting a near gender balance, while among specialists, 40.7% were female, indicating a lower proportion of women in specialized medical fields. Almost half (~50%) of the physicians in the country were general practitioners or family physicians, and 29% of them were foreign trained.

Regional variations show significant variation across provinces and territories. The highest physician densities were observed in British Columbia and Nova Scotia (approximately 270 per 100,000 population each), followed closely by Ontario and Quebec (around 250 per 100,000 population each). In contrast, lower physician densities were reported in Prince Edward Island and Saskatchewan (approximately 215 per 100,000 each), with other provinces such as Alberta, Manitoba and Atlantic Canada regions falling in between.

According to the Government of Canada and CIHI, in 2022, 37% of physicians in the country were immigrants, and 27% of physicians were International medical graduates (IMG). Census 2021, reported that there were 39,474 immigrant physicians in Canada. In contrast, the Canadian Medical Association reported that only 41% of the IMGs living in Canada were practising medicine. Furthermore, 31% of family physicians, 25% of medical specialists and 16% of surgical specialists were foreign trained. According to Statista in 2023, the leading countries of origin for IMGs were South Africa, followed by India and the United Kingdom.

=== Total number of Medical specialists in Canada by Province, c.2023 ===
Number of specialist physicians in Canada as of 2023, by province
Province	Number of specialists
Ontario	18,037
Quebec	11,533
British Columbia	7,408
Alberta	5,823
Manitoba	1,625
Nova Scotia	1,480
Saskatchewan	1,246
New Brunswick	1,033
Newfoundland and Labrador	733
Prince Edward Island	168

=== Total number of Physicians by province c.2018 ===
Number of physicians in Canada (by province & territories)
Province	Number of physicians
Ontario	30,175
Quebec	20,683
British Columbia	11,744
Alberta	10,144
Manitoba	2,871
Nova Scotia	2,481
Saskatchewan	2,424
New Brunswick	1,787
Newfoundland and Labrador	1,504
Prince Edward Island	289
Federal territories	161

=== Total number of Family physicians/ General Practitioners by province c.2018 ===
Number of physicians in Canada (by province & territories)
Province	Number of FM/GPs
Ontario	14,747
Quebec	10,143
British Columbia	6,356
Alberta	5,652
Manitoba	1,492
Nova Scotia	1,316
Saskatchewan	1,427
New Brunswick	1,145
Newfoundland and Labrador	910
Prince Edward Island	178
Federal territories	134

=== Number of physicians by specialisation (Surgical) c.2018 ===
Number of physicians by specialisation in Canada
Specialisation	Number of surgeons
Cardiac surgery	139
Cardiothoracic surgery	110
Thoracic surgery	114
Colorectal surgery	26
General surgery	1,911
Surgical oncology	38
General Surgery (Pediatrics)	77
Vascular surgery	215
Neurosurgery	333
Obstetrics & Gynaecology	2,099
Gynaecologic Reproductive Endocrinology & Infertility	49
Maternal Fetal Medicine	65
Gynecologic oncology	33
Ophthalmology	1,249
Plastic surgery	627
Urology	716
Orthopaedic surgery	1,659

=== Physicians by speciality and sex ===
As of 2019, there were 36,755 female physicians (42.7%), 49,295 male physicians (57.3%) and 42 physicians of unknown gender.

==== Women in medicine ====
The representation of female physicians was highest within major clinical specialties such as Pediatrics (62.2%), Medical Genetics (62.2%), Endocrinology (61.5%), Public Health and Preventive Medicine (51.5%), and Dermatology (50.5%). Among the major surgical disciplines, women physicians were most prevalent in Obstetrics and Gynaecology (61.8%), followed by Surgical Oncology (48.6%), Colorectal Surgery (34.6%), and Ophthalmology (28.3%). In the domain of laboratory medicine, female representation was particularly notable in Forensic Pathology (53.3%), Medical Microbiology (45.5%), Anatomical Pathology (44.4%), and General Pathology (38.4%). As of 2019, there were no female Medical scientists in Canada.

In contrast, male physicians demonstrated the highest representation across several clinical specialties, notably in Nuclear Medicine (79.6%), Cardiology (77.8%), Intensive care medicine (71.5%), Gastroenterology (68.8%), Occupational Medicine (68.5%), Diagnostic Radiology (68.4%), Anesthesiology (67.0%), and Neurology (63.6%). Among the surgical specialties, male predominance was particularly pronounced in Cardiac Surgery (91.3%), Cardiothoracic Surgery (89.3%), Neurosurgery (89.1%), Urology (88.5%), Orthopaedic Surgery (87.3%), Thoracic Surgery (86.0%), and Vascular Surgery (84.5%). Similarly, within laboratory-based disciplines, male physicians were most prevalent in Neuropathology (73.3%), Medical Biochemistry (68.4%), Hematologic Pathology (62.4%), and Clinical Pathology (61.3%).

=== Ontario ===
Ontario, Canada's most populous province, had 30,492 physicians in 2019, according to the data from Canadian Medical Association. This figure represents almost 36% of all physicians in Canada. Female physicians constituted roughly 42% of Ontario's workforce, while young physicians (under 40) represented about 28% of the total workforce.

49% of all physicians in Ontario were Family physicians or General Practitioners, a total of 14,962 FM/GPs. Almost 38%, i.e. 11,705 physicians were medical specialists, and almost 12.5%, i.e. 3,823 were surgeons. Ontario also had the highest number of Medical scientists, 2 out of 7 in Canada.

== Physician shortage in Canada ==
A January 30, 2025 Health Canada report "Caring for Canadians", confirmed the severity of the physician shortage in Canada revealing a significant gap with a need for approximately 23,000 additional family physicians representing a 49% increase from the current supply. According to the report, Canada's production of new doctors is significantly lower than most Organisation for Economic Co-operation and Development (OECD) countries. In 2023, Canada produced only 7.5 new medical graduates per 100,000 people, which is about half the OECD average of 14.2 Canada has 2.8 practicing physicians for every 1,000 people, which is below the OECD average of 3.7 physicians per 1,000 population, according to an OECD report in 2023.

== Education and training ==
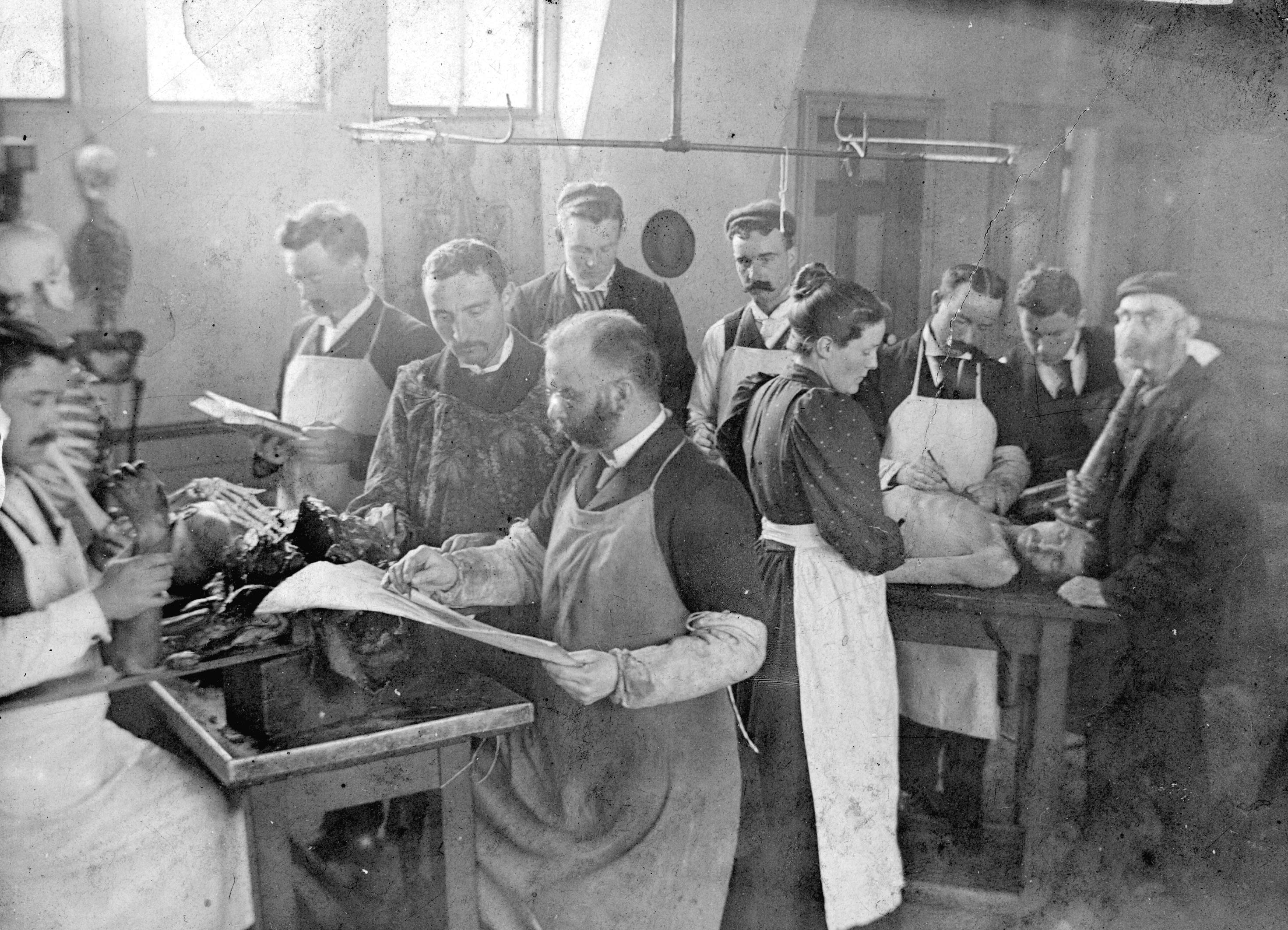
Medical students at Halifax Medical College in Nova Scotia in 1890.

There are multiple components to the education of a physician or surgeon in Canada, and the process varies slightly between provinces.

=== Medical school ===
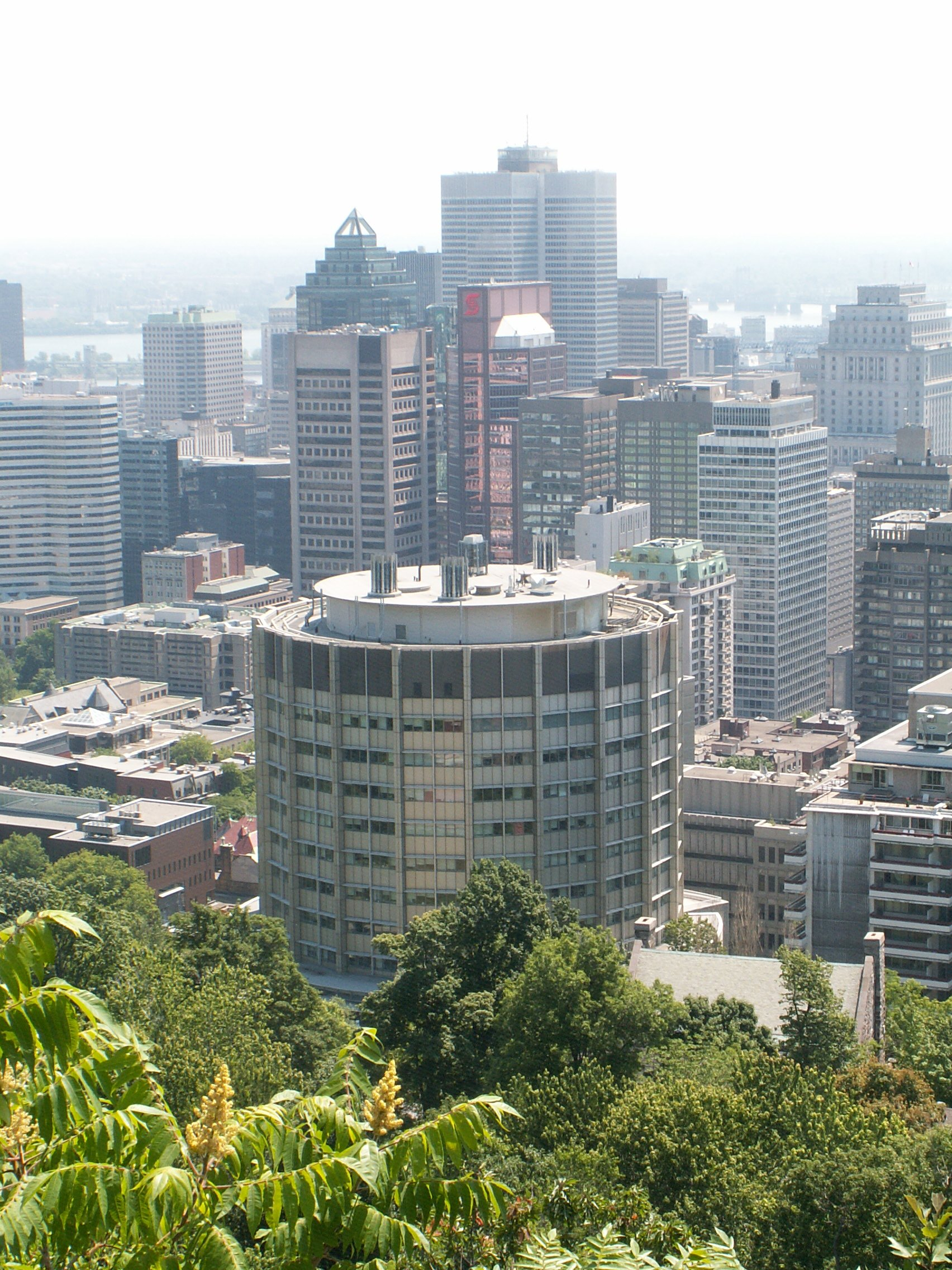
The McIntyre Medical Sciences Building, central hub of the McGill University Faculty of Medicine

Generally, in order to be admitted into a Canadian medical school, one must have completed at least an undergraduate degree. However, not all medical schools in Canada require a bachelor's degree for entry. For example, Quebec's medical schools accept applicants after a two-year CEGEP diploma, which is the equivalent of other provinces' grade 12 plus the first year of university. Most faculties of medicine in Western Canada require at least 2 years, and most faculties in Ontario require at least 3 years of university study before application can be made to medical school. The University of Manitoba requires applicants to complete a prior degree before admission. The Association of Faculties of Medicine of Canada (AFMC) publishes a detailed guide to admission requirements of Canadian faculties of medicine on a yearly basis.

Admission offers are made by individual medical schools, generally on the basis of a personal statement, autobiographical sketch, undergraduate record (GPA), scores on the Medical College Admission Test (MCAT), and interviews. Medical schools in Quebec (Francophones and Anglophone alike), the University of Ottawa (a bilingual school), and the Northern Ontario School of Medicine (a school which promotes francophone culture), do not require the MCAT, as the MCAT has no French equivalent. Some schools, such as the University of Toronto and Queen's University, use the MCAT score as a cut-off, where sub-standard scores compromise eligibility. Other schools, such as the University of Western Ontario, give increasing preference to higher performance. McMaster University strictly utilizes the Critical Analysis and Reasoning section of the MCAT to determine interview eligibility and admission rank.

There are currently seventeen medical schools in Canada. They offer a three- to five-year Doctor of Medicine (M.D.) or Doctor of Medicine and Master of Surgery (M.D., C.M.) degree. The only Canadian medical school to offer the M.D., C.M. degree is McGill University's Faculty of Medicine. Although presently most students enter medicine having previously earned another degree, the M.D. is technically considered an undergraduate degree in Canada.

The annual success rate for Canadian citizens applying for admission to Canadian medical schools is normally below 10%. Just over 2,500 positions were available in first-year classes in 2006-2007 across all seventeen Canadian faculties of medicine. The average cost of tuition in 2006-2007 was $12,728 for medical schools outside of Quebec; in Quebec (for Quebecers only), average tuition was $2,943. The level of debt among Canadian medical students upon graduation has received attention in the medical media.

Medical school in Canada is generally a four-year program at most universities. Notable exceptions include McMaster University and the University of Calgary, where programs run for three years, without interruption for the summer. McGill University and Université de Montréal in the province of Quebec both offer a five-year program that includes a medical preparatory year to entering CEGEP graduates. While Université Laval in Quebec City offers a four- to five-year program to all entering students (both CEGEP graduates and university-level students), Université de Sherbrooke offers a formal four-year M.D. program to all admitted students.

The first half of the medical curriculum is dedicated mostly to teaching the fundamentals of, or basic subjects relevant to, medicine, such as anatomy, histology, physiology, pharmacology, genetics, microbiology, medical ethics, health law, and epidemiology, among many others. This instruction can be organized by discipline or by organ system. Teaching methods can include traditional lectures, problem-based learning, laboratory sessions, simulated patient sessions, and limited clinical experiences. The remainder of medical school is spent in clerkship. Clinical clerks participate in the day-to-day management of patients. They are supervised and taught during this clinical experience by residents and fully licensed staff physicians. Typical rotations include internal medicine, family medicine, psychiatry, surgery, emergency medicine, obstetrics and gynecology, and pediatrics. Elective rotations are often available for students to explore specialties of interest for upcoming residency training.

Some medical schools offer joint degree programs in which a limited number of interested medical students may simultaneously enroll in Master of Science (MSc) or Doctor of Philosophy (PhD) programs in related fields. Often this research training is undertaken during elective time and between the basic science and clinical clerkship halves of the curriculum. For example, while Université de Sherbrooke offers a M.D./MSc program, McGill University offers a M.D./PhD for medical students holding an undergraduate degree in a relevant field. Some universities also offer joint programs in business administration, including McGill University with its joint program leading to the degrees of Doctor of Medicine and Master of Business Administration (M.D./MBA).

=== Residency ===
Residency training is also known as postgraduate medical education.

Graduating medical students in Canada must apply to a residency position via the Canadian Residency Matching Service (CaRMS). Some of the available programs include family medicine, internal medicine, emergency medicine, anesthesia, pediatrics, psychiatry, obstetrics and gynecology, radiology, general surgery, orthopedic surgery, neurosurgery, and urology.

The match for entry level (R-1) postgraduate positions is CaRMS' largest match. It encompasses all 17 Canadian medical schools and is offered in two iterations each year.

The first iteration includes all graduating students and prior year graduates from Canada and the US who meet the basic eligibility criteria and have no prior postgraduate training in Canada or the US. It is also open to graduates from international medical schools (IMGs) who meet the basic criteria and have no prior postgraduate training in Canada or the US. Programs usually have a large number of spots allocated to Canadian medical graduates (CMGs), and a smaller subset of spots allocated to just IMGs. Some programs may not offer any spots to IMGs. CMGs cannot apply for IMG spots and visa-versa.

The second iteration includes positions left over from the first iteration, which are often in less desirable locations, programs, and fields. Applicants not matched in the first iteration can apply to these positions. At this time spots allocated to a particular applicant pool are opened up to everyone (i.e. CMGs and IMGs will now compete for the same spots). Foreign medical graduates who did not match to the positions exclusively offered to them in the first iteration, as well as any US or Canadian physician with prior post-graduate training obtained in either the first or second iterations of their respective matches can also apply to these remaining training positions.

Residents’ salaries are negotiated by the residency associations and are determined by two things: the postgraduate year and the province they are working in. A resident physician in the second year of a training program (PGY-2) in Ontario would receive the same salary as every other resident physician in that province.

=== Fellowship ===
Fellowship is an optional phase of training available to physicians having completed at least part of their residency training.

Although fellowships are much more common among specialist physicians and surgeons, some are available for physicians having completed training in family medicine.

Most fellowship training positions are also allocated using the CaRMS algorithm via the Family Medicine/Emergency Medicine Match, the Medicine Subspecialty Match, and the Pediatric Subspecialty Match. The Family Medicine/Emergency Medicine match is for applicants who are completing or have completed postgraduate training in family medicine in Canada and want to pursue further emergency medicine training. The Medicine Subspecialty Match is for residents currently in an internal medicine residency training program who are looking to apply for subspecialty training. Fields of training may include cardiology, gastroenterology, general internal medicine, nephrology, and respirology, amongst others. The Pediatric Subspecialty Match is for residents currently in a pediatric residency training program who are looking to apply for subspecialty training. Many fields of training are essentially the same as those available for medicine subspecialty training, although the focus is on the pediatric population.

== Licensure ==
Canadian physicians must undergo an extensive process of licensing in order to practice independently. Upon graduating from medical school, they must pass the Medical Council of Canada Qualifying Examination, Part 1. Following residency training, they pass Part 2 of the Medical Council of Canada Qualifying Examination, in addition to their specialty written examinations and objective structured clinical examinations with the CFPC or RCPSC and any supplementary examinations required by provincial or territorial regulatory authorities.

Graduating family physicians will need to pass their CPFC examinations, while specialist physicians or surgeons will need to pass their RCPSC examinations.

=== Medical Council of Canada ===
Founded by the Canada Medical Act in 1912, the Medical Council of Canada (MCC) is an organization charged with the assessment of medical candidates and evaluation of physicians through examinations. It grants a qualification called Licentiate of the Medical Council of Canada (LMCC) to those who wish to practise medicine in Canada.

The MCC administers three different types of examinations:

Exam	Candidates	Assessment areas	Costs
Medical Council of Canada Evaluating Examination (MCCEE)	"international medical graduates, international medical students in their final clinical year and U.S. osteopathic physicians" who wish to take the MCCQE Part I & II and further pursue LMCC in Canada.	General assessment of the candidate's basic medical knowledge in the principal disciplines of medicine; Assesses the skills and knowledge required at the level of a new medical graduate who is about to enter the first year of supervised PGY	$1,737 CDN
Qualifying Examination Part I (QE Part I)	Canadian medical graduates and those who passed MCCEE	Computer-based test; Assesses the competence of candidates who have obtained their medical degree; 4-hour 210-question multiple choice examination; 3.5-hour case-based clinical decision making examination	$1,320 CDN
Qualifying Examination Part II (QE Part II)	Candidates who passed QE Part I	3-hour Objective-Structured Clinical Examination; Assesses knowledge, skills and attitudes essential for medical licensure in Canada prior to entry into independent clinical practice.	$2,490 CDN

A pass standing is required on both the QE Part I and the QE Part II in order to be awarded the Licentiate of the Medical Council of Canada designation. LMCC is recognized by the twelve medical licensing authorities in Canada, and is one of the requirements for the issuance of a licence to practise medicine in Canada.

The MCC also maintains the Canadian Medical Register, a list of physicians who have completed or have been exempted from the LMCC requirement. This is the first step for medical graduates who wish to obtain licence to practise prior to applying to their own regulatory body in their home province or territory.

=== College of Family Physicians of Canada ===
The CFPC establishes the standards for the training, certification, and lifelong education of family physicians in Canada. It accredits postgraduate family medicine training programs in Canadian medical schools, conducts the certification examination for graduating family medicine residents, and grants the certification (CCFP) and fellowship (FCFP) designations to its members. Although membership is not mandatory to practice medicine, it currently numbers over 38,000 members.

==== Enhanced skills programs ====
The CFPC recognizes the following enhanced skills programs for which it delivers a Certificate of Added Competence (CAC) in a specialized domain of family and community medicine:

- Emergency medicine (post-nominal designation: CCFP-EM)
- Palliative care (post-nominal designation: CCFP-PC)
- Care of the elderly (post-nominal designation: CCFP-COE)
- Sport and exercise medicine (post-nominal designation: CCFP-SEM)
- Anesthesia (post-nominal designation: CCFP-FPA)
- Addiction medicine (post-nominal designation: CCFP-AM)
- Enhanced surgical skills (post-nominal designation: CCFP-ESS)

=== Provincial or territorial regulatory authority ===
Once the MCC Qualifying Examination Part 2 and the CFPC or RCPSC examinations are completed, the physician must contact their provincial or territorial regulatory authority in order to obtain their license to practice independently.

For example, in the province of Quebec, the Collège des médecins du Québec is the regulatory authority which emits licenses to physicians and surgeons working within the province. In Ontario, the regulatory college is the College of Physicians and Surgeons of Ontario.

== Physician salary ==
In Canada, physicians are paid through fee-for-service or alternative payment plans such as Shadow Billing. Average salaries for physicians vary by specialty and province, with surgical specialties earning the most.

In 2022–2023, total clinical payments rose to $32.4 billion, marking a 5.3% increase from the previous year. The average gross clinical payment per physician grew by 3.5% to reach $369,000, with figures ranging from $302,000 in Nova Scotia to $410,000 in Alberta. During the same period, physicians delivered over 278 million services, reflecting an increase of nearly 3% year over year.

Canadian physicians are among the highest paid professionals in the country. The average physician salary across all specialities is C$440,487 annually, with a substantial range from C$279,344 for family physicians to C$887,684 for ophthalmologists.

=== Average physician Gross Annual Income by Province ===
Province	Average Annual income (CAD)
Saskatchewan	$503,469
Alberta	$471,279
British Columbia	$448,334
New Brunswick	$445,750
Manitoba	$444,724
Québec	$425,696
Newfoundland and Labrador	$421,050
Nova Scotia	$413,292
Prince Edward Island	$400,700
Ontario	$393,647
AVERAGE	$422,445

=== Average physician Gross Annual income by Speciality ===
Province	Average Annual income (CAD)
Ophthalmology	$907,381
Thoracic & Cardiovascular surgery	$695,112
Neurosurgery	$608,005
Surgical specialists	$606,006
Urology	$602,214
General surgery	$571,042
Cardiology	$566,810
Otolaryngology	$552,096
Plastic surgery	$538,427
Orthopedic surgery	$538,172
Dermatology	$520,427
Gastroenterology	$518,034
Obstetrics & gynaecology	$508,206
Internal medicine	$489,324
Medical specialists	$433,326
Pediatrics	$383,137
Neurology	$375,514
Physical medicine	$371,718
Family medicine	$368,895
Psychiatry	$345,129

=== Ophthalmologist Gross Annual Income by Province ===
Province	Average Annual income (CAD)
Prince Edward Island	$1,393,851
Alberta	$1,389,676
Newfoundland and Labrador	$1,255,499
Manitoba	$1,220,463
Saskatchewan	$1,136,185
Nova Scotia	$1,031,381
British Columbia	$1,015,590
New Brunswick	$841,570
Ontario	$783,745
Québec	$729,798
AVERAGE	$907,381

=== Cardio thoracic surgeon Gross Annual Income by Province ===
Province	Average Annual income (CAD)
Alberta	$925,549
Manitoba	$839,901
Saskatchewan	$809,010
British Columbia	$737,372
Ontario	$713,611
Newfoundland and Labrador	$634,169
Nova Scotia	$614,271
Québec	$564,541
AVERAGE	$695,122

=== Family physician Gross Annual Income by Province ===
Province	Average Annual income (CAD)
Alberta	$414,067
Saskatchewan	$408,435
Québec	$392,508
Manitoba	$390,021
New Brunswick	$383,012
Nova Scotia	$378,924
British Columbia	$366,972
Newfoundland and Labrador	$359,936
Ontario	$341,645
Prince Edward Island	$329,464
AVERAGE	$368,895

== Canadian Medical Protective Association ==
The Canadian Medical Protective Association (CMPA) is a non-profit association committed to provide advice and assistance when medical-legal issues arise in a physician's practice. They provide legal defense, liability protection, and risk-management education for physicians in Canada They also provide monetary compensation to patients and their families proven to have been harmed by negligent clinical care.

== Selected Canadian medically relevant publications ==
- Applied Physiology, Nutrition, and Metabolism
- Biochemistry and Cell Biology
- Canadian Family Physician
- Canadian Journal of Physiology and Pharmacology
- Canadian Journal of Rural Medicine
- Canadian Journal of Surgery
- Canadian Medical Association Journal
- Canadian Medical Education Journal
- Médecin du Québec

== Canadian physicians ==
- Maude Abbott (1896–1940) – Canadian physician, among Canada's earliest female medical graduates, internationally renowned expert on congenital heart disease, and one of the first women to obtain a BA from McGill University
- Evan Adams – First Nations medical doctor, medical advisor, Deputy Provincial Health Advisor (BC), and actor
- Maria Louisa Angwin (1849–1898) – first woman licensed to practice medicine in Nova Scotia
- Elizabeth Bagshaw CM (1881–1982) – physician and birth control activist
- Frederick Banting KBE MC LLD (hc) ScD (hc) FRSC (1891–1941) – Nobel laureate, co-discoverer of insulin
- Khashayar Farzam (1993-Present) - Emergency and family physician, Powerlifter
- Norman Bethune (1890–1939) – surgeon, inventor, socialist, battlefield doctor in Spain and China
- Wilfred Gordon Bigelow OC LLD (hc) FRSC (1913–2005) – inventor of the first artificial pacemaker
- Daniel Borsuk OQ (1978– ) – Montreal plastic surgeon, pioneer in facial reconstruction, and leader of first Canadian face transplant
- Basil Boulton (1938–2008) – pediatrician and child health advocate
- John Callaghan OC AOE (1923–2004) – pioneer of open-heart surgery
- Chris Giannou OC (born 1949) war surgeon, chief surgeon ICRC
- Patrick Gullane CM, OOnt Head and Neck Surgery and Oncology pioneer at University Health Network, Toronto, helped established chairs in oncology.
- Carl Goresky OC (1932–1996) – physician and scientist
- James Heilman (born 1979/1980) – head of the department of emergency medicine at East Kootenay Regional Hospital in Cranbrook, British Columbia, active contributor to WikiProject Medicine, and a volunteer Wikipedia administrator
- Ernest McCulloch CM OOnt FRSC FRS (1926–2011) – cellular biologist credited with the discovery of stem cell with James Till
- Frances Gertrude McGill (1882–1959) – pioneering forensic pathologist and criminologist
- Henry Morgentaler CM LLD (hc) (1923–2013) – abortion care provider who helped legalize abortion in Canada and strengthen the power of jury nullification
- William Osler Bt (1849–1919) – physician, called the "father of modern medicine"; wrote Principles and Practice of Medicine
- Wilder Penfield OM CC CMG FRS (1891–1976) – neurosurgeon, discovered electrical stimulation of the brain
- James Rutka OC (born 1956) Canadian pediatric neurosurgeon
- David Sackett CC FRSC (born 1934) – founded the first department of clinical epidemiology in Canada at McMaster University
- Sydney Segal CM OBC (1920–1997) – pediatrician and neonatologist particularly known for his work with sudden infant death syndrome
- Albert Ross Tilley (1904–1988) OBE OC – plastic surgeon
- Irene Cybulsky
- Melanie Morris

== See also ==
- College of Family Physicians of Canada
- Royal College of Physicians and Surgeons of Canada
- History of public health in Canada
