= Noura Ziadi =

Canadian research scientist

Noura Ziadi is a Canadian research scientist with Agriculture and Agri-Food Canada (AAFC), at the Quebec Research and development centre, whose research focuses on soil fertility and plant nutrition. She has developed technologies, methods, and knowledge for better management of mineral fertilizers that increase their efficiency while reducing environmental impact. More specifically, Ziadi developed and validated models to diagnose nitrogen and phosphorus status for different crops, developed new technologies to ensure effective management of industrial wastes (paper mill biosolids) and biochar, and developed methods for soil analysis. Ziadi conducts her research on national and international scales in multidisciplinary teams that include government, university, and industry partners. Her research increases agricultural productivity and enhances environmental performance earning her recognition as an influential woman in agriculture.

== Education ==
Ziadi holds a B.Sc. in Agronomy from École supérieure des grandes cultures in Tunisia (1986) and an international certificate in cereal production from Italy (1992). She worked as an engineer for four years for the Ministry of Agriculture in Tunisia before coming to Canada in 1992 to continue her graduate studies. Ziadi obtained an excellence scholarship from the Fondation Université Laval to complete her doctoral studies. She obtained her M.Sc. and a Ph.D. from Laval University and initially planned on returning to Tunisia following her studies, however, in 1998 she decided to accept her position as a Research Scientist in soil fertility and plant nutrition with Agriculture and Agri-Food Canada. She has been working for the Quebec Research and Development Centre ever since.

== Career ==
Ziadi began her career as a soil scientist in 1998 with AAFC at the Quebec Research and Development Centre (QRDC). Since 2003, she has led the Soil Fertility research lab at the QRDC. Ziadi's research program has focused on soil fertility, plant nutrition, and more specifically research to better understand nutrient cycling under different agro-ecosystems. Ziadi developed and validated models to diagnose nitrogen and phosphorus status for different crops and developed new technologies to ensure effective management of industrial wastes (paper mill biosolids) and biochar. Ziadi also developed the use of ionic exchange membranes and the near-infrared spectroscopy technique for soil analyses.

In 2004, Ziadi prepared her first national research proposal for funding. The project was accepted and funded, and she has not stopped taking the lead since. Cynthia Grant, formerly of the AAFC-Brandon Research Centre, co-lead this project, and they collaborated with France and Belgium taking the project from national to international.

Ziadi contributed to the leadership of several multidisciplinary research projects funded either by AAFC or in collaboration with industry. Her research is conducted on a national and international scale (Canada, France, China, Switzerland, Finland, Saudi Arabia, Tunisia) in multidisciplinary teams that include government, university, and industry partners. From 2007 to 2016, she led 3 research projects involving 17 researchers from 5 Canadian provinces and four other countries, with a research budget of over $2 million. Her rigorous and meticulous management of financial resources has allowed her to use public funds as efficiently as possible. Ziadi has published more than 170 papers, five reviews, and 13 book chapters.

Ziadi is leading a long-term study of legacy phosphorus across Canada. Without adequate phosphorus, plant growth and crop yield are reduced. Fertilizer phosphorus added beyond the crop's yearly needs can remain tightly bound to the soil and is known as “residual phosphorus” or “legacy phosphorus”. The availability of this legacy phosphorus is relatively unknown, so AAFC researchers at various locations across Canada are being led by Ziadi to investigate this topic.

Ziadi has been an adjunct professor at Laval University in Quebec City since 2004, at the Graduate University of the Chinese Academy of Science in Beijing, China, since 2012 and at the Université du Québec at Abitibi-Témiscamingue since 2016. She has hired and trained many students and postdocs which she views as one of her biggest accomplishments as a researcher. She has guided and supervised over 40 students in their postdoctoral, doctoral and master’s theses and is known to take the time to learn about their interests and scientific questions, while sharing her passion for research.

Ziadi has been a member of the Canadian Society of Soil Science (CSSS) since 1993, serving as Eastern Council (2008-2010), CSSS President-elect (2017), President (2018) and Past-President (2019). She has also been an Associate Editor with the Canadian Journal of Soil Science for 10 years and for Agronomy Journal from 2012 to 2014.

== Honours and awards ==
- Influential Woman in Canadian Agriculture Award (2021)
- Best Associate Editor- Canadian Journal of soil science (2017)
- Fellow from the Canadian Society of Soil Science (2015)
- President- Elect for the Canadian Society of Soil Science (2017)
- President for the Canadian Society of Soil Science (2018)
- Past-President for the Canadian Society of Soil Science (2019)
- Nominated for the award “Femme de Merite 2014 de YWCA, Quebec” under science and technology section (2014)
- Award of excellence of outstanding paper from the Canadian J. of Plant science (2009)
- Award of excellence of outstanding paper from the American society of weed science (February 2009)
- Queen's Jubilee Medal from Agriculture and Agri-Food Canada (December 2002)
- Award of the best student poster presented during the meeting of the Canadian Society of Soil science (1999)
- Scholarship from the Canadian Society of Soil Science (Student Travel Award for 1998)
- Scholarship of excellence from the “Formation des Chercheurs et l’Aide à la Recherche (FCAR) ’’ (Ph.D. 1995 and 1996)
- Scholarship of excellence from the “Fondation de l'Université Laval’’ (Ph.D. 1994)
- Award of the best student poster presented during the meeting of the “Association Québecoise des spécialistes en science du sol” (1996)
