= Canadian Journal of Animal Science =

- Discipline: Animal science
- Language: English, French
- Edited by: Tim McAllister, Greg Penner

Publication details
- History: 1957–present
- Publisher: Canadian Science Publishing (Canada)
- Frequency: Quarterly
- Open access: Delayed, after 12 months; Hybrid
- Impact factor: 1.1 (2025)

Standard abbreviations
- ISO 4: Can. J. Anim. Sci.

Indexing
- ISSN: 0008-3984 (print); 1918-1825 (web)
- OCLC no.: 17346081

Links
- Journal homepage; Online access; Online archive

The Canadian Journal of Animal Science (French: Revue canadienne de zootechnie) is a quarterly peer-reviewed scientific journal covering research on all aspects of animal agriculture and animal products. It was established in 1921 and is published by Canadian Science Publishing. The current editors-in-chief are Tim McAllister (Agriculture and Agri-Food Canada) and Greg Penner (University of Saskatchewan).

== History ==
In 1921, the Agricultural Institute of Canada established the journal Scientific Agriculture/La revue agronomique canadienne. It was renamed in 1953 to Canadian Journal of Agricultural Science. In 1957 the institute split the journal into three, one of them being the Canadian Journal of Animal Science. In 2015 the journal was acquired by its current publisher.

== Abstracting and indexing ==
The journal is abstracted and indexed in:

- Biological Abstracts
- BIOSIS Previews
- CAB Abstracts
- Current Contents/Agriculture, Biology & Environmental Sciences
- EBSCO databases
- Embase
- Food Science & Technology Abstracts
- ProQuest databases
- Science Citation Index Expanded
- Scopus

According to the Journal Citation Reports, the journal has a 2024 impact factor of 1.0.

== See also ==
- Canadian Journal of Plant Science
- Canadian Journal of Soil Science
