= PLAA =

PLAA or Plaa can refer to:

== People ==
- Martin Plaa (1901 – 1978), a French tennis player
- Gabriel L. Plaa (1930 – 2009), an American-Canadian toxicologist

== Other uses ==
- Poor Law Amendment Act 1834, an 1834 UK law denying the right to feed the poor
- People's Liberation Army Army, the land forces of the People's Liberation Army in China
- Phospholipase A-2-activating protein, a human gene
