= Canadian Journal of Biochemistry and Physiology =

- Discipline: Biochemistry, Physiology
- Language: English, French

Publication details
- Former name: Canadian Journal of Medical Sciences
- History: 1954–1963
- Publisher: NRC Research Press (Canada)
- Open access: no

Standard abbreviations
- ISO 4: Can. J. Biochem. Physiol.

Indexing
- ISSN: 0576-5544

The Canadian Journal of Biochemistry and Physiology is a defunct peer-reviewed scientific journal of biochemistry and physiology established in 1954 as the continuation of the Canadian Journal of Medical Sciences and published by NRC Research Press. In 1964 it split into two different journals Canadian Journal of Biochemistry and Canadian Journal of Physiology and Pharmacology.

During its life the Canadian Journal of Biochemistry and Physiology published almost 2000 papers, of which one had been cited 48000 times by early 2023, half of the total number for the journal. The journal was particularly strong in relation to early enzymology, including, for example, a study of the spectrophotometric determination of various proteolytic enzymes, and one of the first systematic treatments of the kinetics of two-substrate reactions, antedating the better known work of W. Wallace Cleland.
