= Cynthia Grant (soil scientist) =

Canadian federal scientist

- Born: Manitoba, Canada
- Education: University of Manitoba
- Scientific career
- Fields: Agriculture, soil fertility, crop nutrition, organic matter
- Workplaces: Agriculture and Agri-Food Canada; Brandon Research and Development Centre

Cynthia Grant is a Canadian soil scientist who worked for Agriculture and Agri-Food Canada (AAFC) from 1986 to 2015. Her research focused on soil fertility and crop nutrition, with particular emphasis on nutrient management practices for prairie agriculture. Her work contributed to the development of the Canadian “4R” nutrient stewardship framework, which promotes the application of nutrients from the right source, at the right rate, time, and place. In 2019 she was inducted into the Canadian Agricultural Hall of Fame, one of a small number of women recognized since its founding.

== Early life ==
Grant grew up on a farm near Minnedosa in southwestern Manitoba. She developed an early interest in agriculture and participated in her local 4-H beef club.

She completed her B.S.A. (1980), M.Sc. (1982), and Ph.D. (1986) in soil science at the University of Manitoba. She received several academic awards, including the University of Manitoba Gold Medal in Agriculture, the Alfred Rea Tucker Scholarship, an NSERC Graduate Scholarship, and a Potash and Phosphate Institute Fellowship. She was the first woman to earn a Ph.D. in soil science from the University of Manitoba.

== Career ==
Grant joined AAFC’s Brandon Research and Development Centre in 1986, where she worked until 2015.Her research examined nutrient management strategies for prairie cropping systems, with attention to protein concentration, trace elements such as cadmium, and sustainable fertilizer use.

She conducted collaborative studies on cadmium–phosphorus interactions with Fertilizer Canada and contributed to a phosphorus fertilization review with the University of Manitoba. Her research included the development of beneficial management practices (BMPs) for major crop nutrients, and she was among the first Canadian researchers supported by the international Fluid Fertilizer Foundation.

Grant produced a substantial body of extension and scientific work. She presented research findings across North America, South America, Australia, Europe, and Asia on enhanced efficiency fertilizers (EEFs) and 4R management strategies.

She authored or co-authored more than 180 peer-reviewed journal articles on soil fertility and crop nutrition, as well as over 200 extension bulletins, reports, and presentations.[11] She also contributed chapters on soil fertility and sulphur management and co-edited a book on integrated nutrient management.[5][10]

Her work has been cited widely; as of 2019, she was the lead author of three of the ten most cited papers in the Canadian Journal of Plant Science.

In addition to her research role, Grant served as an adjunct professor in the Department of Soil Science at the University of Manitoba, where she supervised students and collaborated on research projects. She held editorial roles with the Journal of Environmental Quality, the Canadian Journal of Soil Science, and the Canadian Journal of Plant Science. She also served as president of both the Canadian Society of Agronomy and the Canadian Society of Soil Science, the only person to hold both positions as of 2019.

Her career is recognized in the Women in STEM poster gallery created by Ingenium Canada, a collaboration of three national science and technology museums and partner organizations.

== Honours and awards ==
- International Fertilizer Industry Association Award for Young Professionals
- Robert E. Wagner Award, Potash and Phosphate Institute (1997–98)
- Researcher of the Year, Fluid Fertilizer Foundation (2000)
- Non-Farmer of the Year Award, Manitoba–North Dakota Zero Tillage Farmers Association (2007)
- Young Agronomists Award, Canadian Society of Agronomy (2001)
- President, Canadian Society of Agronomy (1999–2001)
- Fellow, Canadian Society of Agronomy (2004)
- President, Canadian Society of Soil Science (2010)
- Fellow, American Society of Agronomy (2010)
- Fellow, Canadian Society of Soil Science (2011)
- Gold Harvest Award, Agriculture and Agri-Food Canada (2011)
- Associate Editor, Journal of Environmental Quality (2009–2011)
- Certificate of Merit, Faculty of Agricultural and Food Sciences, University of Manitoba (2015)
- Distinguished Agronomist Award, Canadian Society of Agronomy (2015)
- Innovative Technologies Advancing the Fertilizer Industry Award, Fertilizer Industry Round Table (2015)
- Canola Award of Excellence, Manitoba Canola Growers Association (2019)
- Leo M. Walsh Soil Fertility Distinguished Lectureship (2019)
- Inductee, Canadian Agricultural Hall of Fame (2019)
