= CSPT =

CSPT may refer to:

- Canadian Society of Pharmacology and Therapeutics;
- The Czech-Slovak Poker Tour.
