= Gabriel L. Plaa =

American-Canadian toxicologist

Gabriel Leon "Gabbie" Plaa (May 15, 1930 – November 11, 2009) was an American-Canadian toxicologist. A specialist of hepatotoxicity, he held various administrative position at Université de Montréal from 1968 to 1989, receiving the grade of professor emeritus upon his retirement in 1996. Over the course of his career he was president of several scientific society and served in editorial capacity for numerous scientific journals. Amongst many awards, he was the first recipient of the Society of Toxicology's (SOT) Achievement Award, an award granted to a "promising young scientist".

== Biography ==
Plaa was born in San Francisco on May 15, 1930, the son of Jean and Lucienne Plaa, who were Basque French immigrants. He graduated from the University of California in 1952 with a bachelor's degree in criminalistics. The previous year he had married his wife, Colleen Neva; the couple would have eight children. After a brief interlude during which he served in Korea with the U.S. Army Reserve, he returned to complete graduate studies. Unable to obtain a stipend, he was offered to reorient toward pharmacology and toxicology, which he did, earning his M.Sc. in 1956 and his Ph.D. in 1958. (Note: Although all sources agree about his degrees, they are unclear or conflicting as to which exactly of the components of the USC system (specifically San Francisco or Berkeley) granted them.)

Plaa went to teach at Tulane University, then the University of Iowa, before in 1968 he was hired by Université de Montréal (UdeM) as Chairman of the Department of Pharmacology, a young promising scientist who the previous year had become the first recipient of the newly created Achievement Award of the American Society of Toxicology. At UdeM he would hold a succession of positions in addition to his teaching and research (He remained Chairman of the Department of Pharmacology until 1980.): Vice-Dean of the Faculty of Graduate Studies (1979-1982) and Vice Dean for research and graduate studies of the Faculty of Medicine (1982-1989). (Note: Several sources confuse these two positions and cite a "Vice-Dean of Research and Graduate Studies" appointment. Such a position never existed at UdeM.) From 1990 to his retirement, he was director of the Montreal-based Centre Interuniversitaire de Recherche en Toxicologie.

Plaa's appointment did not end with UdeM. He also served as president of the Society of Toxicology of Canada (STC; 1981-1983), then the SOT in 1983-84, as well as the Pharmacological Society of Canada. (Note: The Pharmacological Society of Canada was a predecessor of the modern Canadian Society of Pharmacology and Therapeutics.) He sat on a number of scientific committees and was chairman of the IUPHAR's toxicology section. He was editor or associate editor of the Canadian Journal of Physiology and Pharmacology, Toxicology and Applied Pharmacology, the Journal of Pharmacology and Experimental Therapeutics, and a member of the editorial board of several more. Amongst the many awards he received are the SOT's Merit Award (the Society's highest), Arnold Lehman, and Education Awards, while from the STC he received the V.E. Henderson Award and the STC Award of Distinction. In 2003, on the occasion of UdeM's 125th anniversary, the institution recognized Dr. Plaa by giving the title of "Pioneer" of the institution.

After his retirement, Plaa spent most of his time at home with his wife, who has multiple sclerosis. He died from cancer on November 11, 2009.

== Research and legacy ==
Plaa's primary area of research was hepatotoxicity, in which his successes where achieved primarily by the investigation of mechanistic toxicology. His primary contributions were in the areas of cholestasis and toxic potentiation, in particular potentiation by haloalkanes. Although the use of the isolated perfused liver was already well-known, having been first used in the early 19th century, Plaa was the first to use it for the study of hepatotoxicity. A long-time career goal for him was to elaborate methods to determine human hepatotoxicity (and particularly cholestasis-inducing abilities in drugs) from animal tests; although this endeavour was never a success, (Note: Indeed the difficulty of this task remains an issue in modern toxicology, particularly in the context of drug clinical testing.) it led to a much improved understanding of the mechanisms of cholestasis. According to Plaa, much of his mechanisms- and protocols-oriented research was an effect of his original formation in criminalistics.

Plaa's scientific career led to the publication of 233 peer-reviewed articles bearing his name, as well as 48 book chapters and literature reviews. He directed over thirty Master's and Ph.D. students, of which two themselves received the SOT Achievement Award, and six served as president of the Society. The UdeM Department of Pharmacology annual internal conference (Journées de la recherche) is named after Dr. Plaa, as is an endowed fund of the SOT.

== Notes and references ==
Notes
