= CJPP =

CJPP may refer to

- Canadian Journal of Physiology and Pharmacology
- Canadian Journal of Plant Pathology
- CJPP-FM, a low-power tourist radio station in Point Pelee, Ontario
