= Cynthia Grant =

Cynthia Grant may refer to:

- Cynthia Grant (soil scientist)
- Cynthia Grant (director)

== See also ==
- Cynthia Grant Bowman, American legal scholar
