= Carl Goresky =

Canadian physician and scientist

Carl Arthur Goresky, OC (August 25, 1932 – March 21, 1996) was a Canadian physician and scientist at the Montreal General Hospital. His theoretical treatment of the transport of substances through intact organs, which formed the basis of his PhD thesis, led the basis for the understanding of events within the microvasculature.

In November 1995, Goresky was inducted into the Order of Canada as Officer.

== Selected publications ==
- Goresky, Carl Arthur (1963). "A linear method for determining liver sinusoidal and extravascular volumes". American Journal of Physiology. 204 (4): 626–40. doi:10.1152/ajplegacy.1963.204.4.626. PMID 13949263.
- Goresky, Carl Arthur (1995). "Biological barriers and medicine". Clinical and Investigative Medicine. 18 (6): 484–501. PMID 8714792.
