= Canadian Journal of Forest Research =

Peer-reviewed scientific journal

- Discipline: Forestry
- Language: English, French
- Edited by: Lisa Venier; Nelson Thiffault; Jari Vauhkonen

Publication details
- History: 1971–present
- Publisher: Canadian Science Publishing (Canada)
- Frequency: Monthly
- Impact factor: 1.7 (2023)

Standard abbreviations
- ISO 4: Can. J. For. Res.

Indexing
- ISSN: 0045-5067 (print); 1208-6037 (web)

Links
- Journal homepage

The Canadian Journal of Forest Research is a peer-reviewed scientific journal published by Canadian Science Publishing. It covers research related to forest resource management, including forest biology, biometry, conservation, economics, genetics, human dimensions, management, operations, protection, policy, remote sensing, soils, silviculture, wildlife and wood science. The journal publishes articles, reviews, notes, discussions and replies, perspectives, method papers and data papers.

The journal was established in 1971 and published quarterly till 1982. From 1983 till 1986 it was published bimonthly. Between 1987 and December 2024, it was published monthly. Since January 2025, it is published continuously.

The editors-in-chief are Lisa Venier, Nelson Thiffault and Jari Vauhkonen.

The Canadian Journal of Forest Research was selected as one of the DBIO 100, the 100 most influential journals in biology and medicine over the last 100 years as voted by the BioMedical & Life Sciences Division of the Special Libraries Association on the occasion of its centennial.

== See also ==
- List of forestry journals
