= John Ellis Hare =

John Ellis Hare (1933, Toronto – 18 April 2005, Ottawa) was a Francophone author, historian, biographer, bibliographer, and academic. He was a professor at the University of Ottawa in Ontario, Canada.

== Early life and education ==
Hare was born in Toronto, and began his studies at the University of Toronto Schools. He obtained his bachelor and master's degrees in Philosophy from Laval University between 1955 and 1956.

== Career ==
=== Early career ===
In 1959, Hare was a lecturer at the Seminary of Quebec, Laval University and at the University of Ottawa Department of French Letters. At the Seminary Hare met the Quebecois historian and author Honorious Provost, head Archivist of the Quebec Small Seminary. From 1960 to 1970 Honorious and Hare produced various historical works on the Region of Beauce, Quebec.

Hare personally published works on the History of Beauce and the French Canadians or Habitants who resisted the American Invasion. Hare's paper published in the Bibliographic Society of Canada's Journal discusses the British Propaganda pamphlet "The Canadian and His Wife." Hare located this pamphlet at the Quebec Seminary after discovering the entry in Marie Tremaine's Bibliography. This anti-American Revolution pamphlet was an example of British propaganda that was released to the Canadian Militia to urge them to resist the American invasion.

After these experiences in teaching and publishing, Hare obtained a Master's degree in 1962, and PhD in 1971 in Linguistics from the University of Laval.

=== University of Ottawa ===
Hare became a professor in the Department of French Letters at the University of Ottawa in 1966, lecturing, researching and writing about in French-Canadian history and society for thirty years. At one time he was head of the documentation section of the university's French-Canadian Civilization Research Centre. He was a founder of the Groupe de recherche sur les idéologies dans la société Canadienne-française (GRISCAF).

In 1971, shortly after the October Crisis in Quebec, Hare produced a work on the Lower Canadian Rebellion, also known as the Patriot's War. In 1973, Hare and Jean-Pierre Wallot, the former Head of the National Archives of Canada, were the first to be awarded the Marie Tremaine Medal by the Bibliographic Society of Canada (after Marie Tremaine herself) for their work on Canadian Imprints from 1801 to 1840.

=== Francophone theatre and book reviews ===
Since 1970, Hare worked for the Ottawa Citizen chronicling French theatrical activities and after 1985 writing French book reviews in the Ottawa Region. John Hare published several books and articles on Sarah Bernhardt and her influences of the theatre in Montreal.

== Retirement and death ==
In 1996, Hare was made Professor Emeritus at the University of Ottawa. He died in Ottawa in 2005.

== Selected works ==
- John Hare, 1967. "Les Imprimés Dans Le Bas-Canada 1801-1840", Montréal: Presses de l'Université de Montréal.Retrieved November 21, 2019.
- Hamel, Réginald, Hamel, Réginald, Hare, John, and Wyczynski, Paul 1989. "Dictionnaire Des Auteurs de Langue Française En Amérique Du Nord".
- John Hare, Les Patriotes,1830-1839,1971. Montréal: Les Éditions Libération,
- John Hare, 1963. "Le Canadien et sa femme : une brochure de propagande politique (1794)", Papers of The Bibliographical Society of Canada, 2(1).
- Hare, John, 1984. “Sarah Bernhardt’s Influence on the Theatrical Life of Montreal.” in Bernhardt and the Theatre of Her Time. Ed. Eric Salmon. Connecticut: Greenwood Press, pp. 133–145.
