= Maria Louisa Angwin =

First woman licensed to practice medicine in Nova Scotia, Canada

- Born: 21 September 1849; Blackhead, Newfoundland Colony, British North America
- Died: 25 April 1898 (aged 48); Ashland, Massachusetts, United States
- Education: Mount Allison University, Woman’s Medical College
- Occupation: Physician

Maria Louisa Angwin (September 21, 1849 – April 25, 1898) was a Canadian physician. She was the first woman licensed to practice medicine in Nova Scotia.

== Life ==
Angwin was born on 21 September 1849 in Blackhead, Conception Bay, Newfoundland. She was the daughter of Louisa Emma Gill and Reverend Thomas Angwin, a Methodist minister. Her family moved to Nova Scotia in 1865. She was educated at the lady's academy of Mount Allison Wesleyan Academy, receiving a liberal arts degree in 1869. She attended the normal school in Truro and taught school for five years in Dartmouth to finance her further studies.

Angwin received an MD from the Woman’s Medical College in New York state in 1882. She interned at the New England Hospital for Women and Children in Boston. She continued her studies at the Royal Free Hospital in London. On 20 September 1884 she became the first woman licensed to practise medicine in Nova Scotia, where she set up an office in Halifax. In 1895, she lectured on hygiene, together with Annie Isabella Hamilton, the first woman to receive an MD from Dalhousie University.

She was a member of the Woman’s Christian Temperance Union and also spoke in favour of women's suffrage.

She returned to New York in 1897 to pursue post-graduate studies. She died suddenly on 25 April 1898 in Ashland, Massachusetts while recovering from minor surgery.

In 2025 a health clinic named after Angwin, the Dr. Maria Angwin Memorial – Wyse Road Health Clinic, opened in Dartmouth, Nova Scotia.
