= Canadian Journal of Civil Engineering =

- Discipline: Civil engineering
- Language: English, French
- Edited by: Nihar Biswas and Amir Fam

Publication details
- History: 1974-present
- Publisher: NRC Research Press (Canada)
- Frequency: Monthly
- Impact factor: 1.380 (2020)

Standard abbreviations
- ISO 4: Can. J. Civ. Eng.

Indexing
- ISSN: 1208-6029

Links
- Journal homepage

The Canadian Journal of Civil Engineering is a monthly peer-reviewed scientific journal established in 1974 and published by the NRC Research Press. It covers environmental, hydrotechnical, structure, and construction engineering, as well as engineering mechanics, engineering materials, and a history of civil engineering. Papers are available on the Internet in advance of print issues and are available in full-text HTML and PDF formats.

The Canadian Journal of Civil Engineering is the official journal of the Canadian Society for Civil Engineering. The editors in chief are Nihar Biswas (University of Windsor) and Amir Fam (Queen's University).
