= John Callaghan (physician) =

Canadian cardiac surgeon

- Born: John Carter Callaghan; October 1, 1923; Hamilton, Ontario
- Died: April 6, 2004 (aged 80)
- Occupation: cardiac surgeon
- Awards: Order of Canada; Alberta Order of Excellence

John Carter Callaghan, OC AOE (October 1, 1923 – April 6, 2004) was a Canadian cardiac surgeon who "pioneered open-heart surgery in Alberta"

Born in Hamilton, Ontario on October 1, 1923, he received his medical degree from the University of Toronto in 1946. In 1955, he joined the Division of Cardiovascular and Thoracic Surgery at the University of Alberta Hospital and performed Canada's first successful open heart surgery.

In 1985, he was made an Officer of the Order of Canada. In 1986, he was inducted into the Alberta Order of Excellence.
