= University of Toronto Schools =

Independent laboratory school in Ontario, Canada

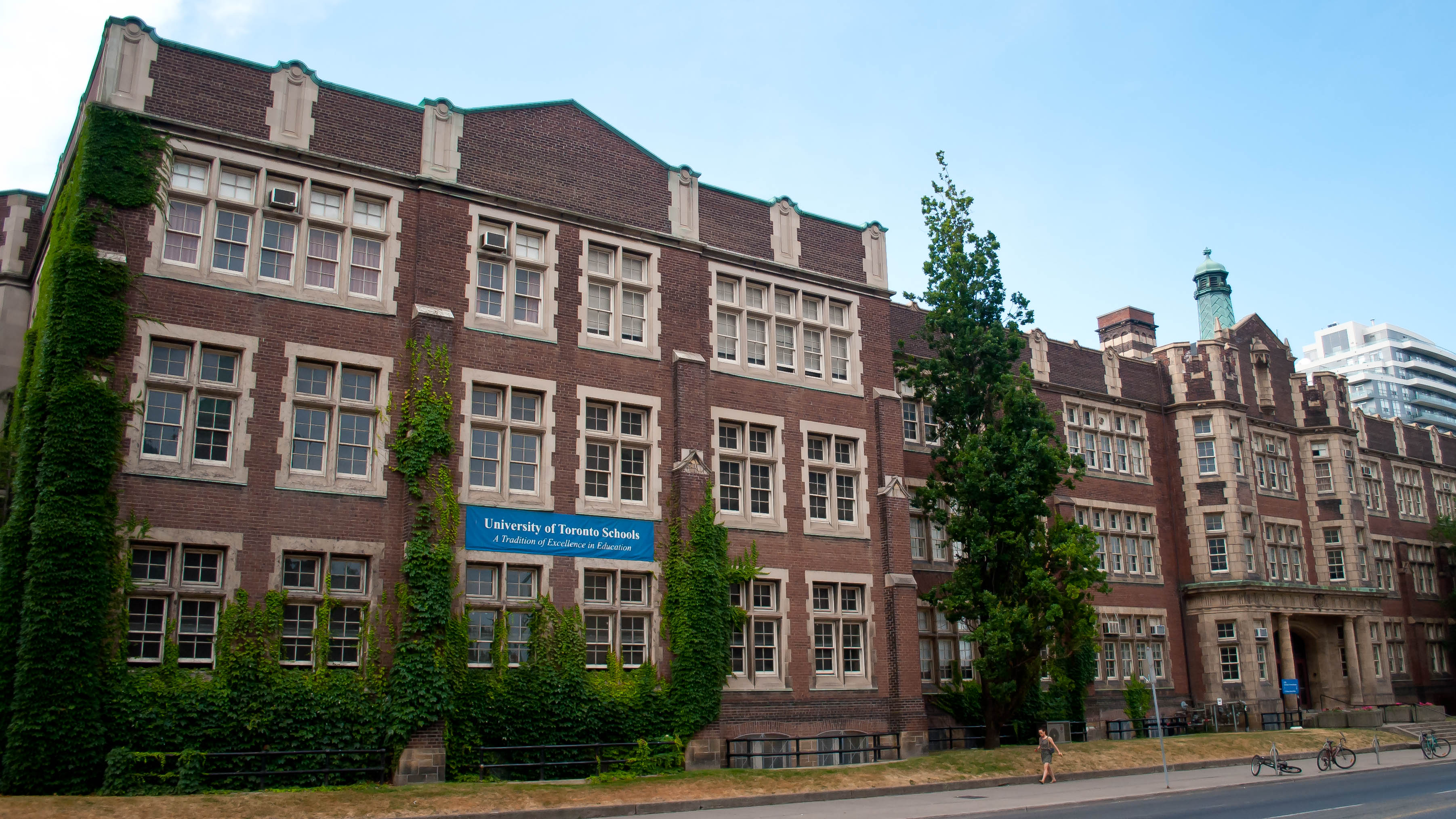

Location
- 371 Bloor Street West; Toronto, Ontario; Canada; 43°40′0″N 79°24′8″W

Information
- School type: Independent laboratory school
- Motto: Velut arbor ita ramus (Latin) (Like the tree, so the branch)
- Established: September 12, 1910 (116 years ago)
- Principal: Leanne Foster
- Teaching staff: 75
- Grades: 7–12
- Gender: Coeducational
- Enrollment: 675 (2023)
  - Grade 7: Around 96 students
  - Grade 8: No new enrollment
  - Grade 9: Around 22 new students
  - Grade 10: Up to 4, depending on space
  - Grade 11: Up to 4, depending on space
  - Grade 12: No new enrollment
- Language: English
- Campus type: Urban
- Houses: Althouse Gators, Cody Cougars, Crawford Knights, Lewis Vikings
- Colours: Blue
- Team name: UTS Blues
- Newspaper: Cuspidor
- Yearbook: The Twig
- Tuition: $35,800 + (2024-2025)
- Affiliation: University of Toronto
- Nobel laureates: 2
- Website: utschools.ca

The University of Toronto Schools (UTS) is an independent secondary day school affiliated with the University of Toronto in Toronto, Ontario, Canada. The school follows a specialized academic curriculum, and admission is determined by a written examination and multiple mini-interviews. Two Nobel Prize laureates attended UTS.

== History ==
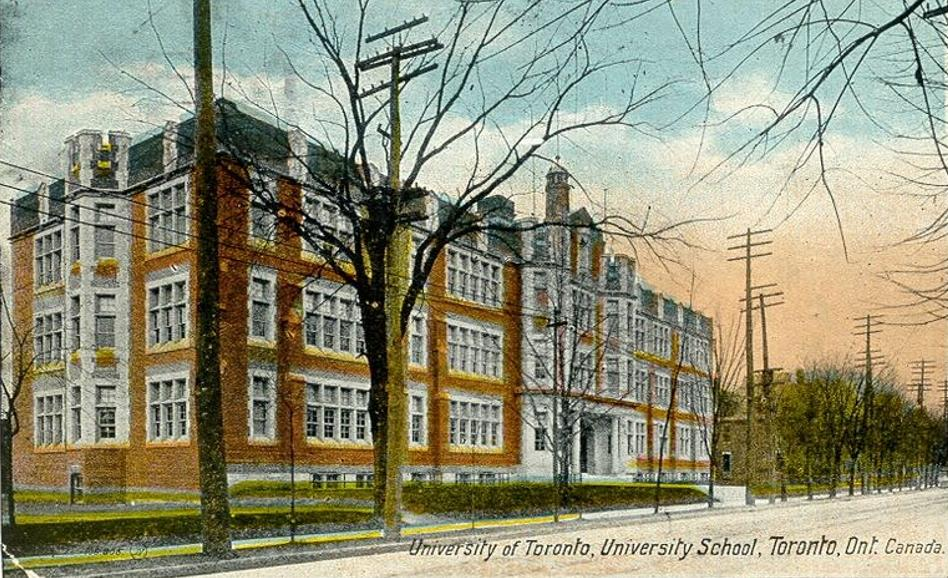
View of the school in 1920

University of Toronto Schools was founded in 1910 as a "practice school", also known as a laboratory school, for the University of Toronto's Faculty of Education. As originally conceived and reflected in its present name, UTS was intended to be a collection of at least two schools, one of which would enroll female students. The original plan was to recruit 200 teachers and 1200 students, but financial constraints limited the number of students to 375 boys.

The school operated a junior ice hockey team during the 1910s and 1920s in the Ontario Hockey Association. The school won the J. Ross Robertson Cup as the playoffs champions in 1919, and were finalists in 1914 and 1923. The Memorial Cup was established as the junior hockey championship of Canada in 1919. The school defeated Montreal Melville by an 8–2 score in a single game playoff to qualify as the Eastern Canada representative at the 1919 Memorial Cup. They defeated the Regina Patricias in two games, by scores of 14-3 and 15–5. Memorial Cup alumnus Dunc Munro later played as a defenceman in the National Hockey League.

UTS's first headmaster was H. J. "Bull" Crawford, who also taught classics at the school. Crawford was responsible for most administrative tasks, which, until a secretary was hired in 1921, included signing admit slips. In 1925, Mike Rodden coached the UTS Rugby team to an undefeated season, culminating in the Canadian Interscholastic Championship.

In 1934, A.C. Lewis succeeded John Althouse to become the third headmaster. In 1944, W. B. "Brock" MacMurray, a 1924 graduate of the school, became the fourth headmaster; his 28-year term at UTS remains the longest in school history. In 1957, the House System was established, with three of four houses named after the school's first three headmasters - Crawford, Althouse, and Lewis. The fourth house, Cody, was named after a former president of the University of Toronto.

The 1960s were a "turbulent" decade in the history of UTS. Prior to the 1960s, the Ontario Ministry of Education required seniors to complete a number of matriculation exams in order to graduate. The student who scored highest on the province-wide exams would be awarded the Prince of Wales Scholarship; during the matriculation era, UTS students won thirteen Prince of Wales Scholarships.

Although matriculation exams would eventually be abolished in the 1960s, UTS students had been calling for change since the late 1930s in the form of valedictory addresses and protests. Addresses in 1963 and 1966 targeted the tendency for matriculations to reduce "a tangible desire for knowledge", producing instead "a mind that cannot think for itself". In 1967 the valedictory address lambasted a number of teachers and administrators who had been responsible for rigidly holding UTS to its past. The speech was not published in The Twig the following year, but was still circulated among students. Discontent with the school's inability to reform climaxed in the "Protest for Nothing" in May 1969, which was led by Brian Blugerman, Michael Eccles, Paul Eprile and David Glennie. Unlike most protests, the placards that the protesters held were blank; when headmaster MacMurray asked for their demands, a student famously showed him a blank sheet of paper and stated, "This is a list of our demands." The protest was front-page news in Toronto newspapers and was widely reported in the U.S. media, including the New York Times.

At the turn of the decade, UTS developed a "New Program", which focused on completing subjects ("units") for graduation instead of matriculations. The administration also agreed to allow students to complete their secondary school requirements in 4 years instead of 5, an advantage that was enjoyed until the 2003 double cohort. The Executive Council was formed in 1968 to provide a liaison between students and staff. Some of the Executive Council's first recommendations were implemented in 1969, including making Latin optional after grade 11 and introducing non-numerical grades for Arts and Music courses. In addition to academics, certain aspects of the school's extracurricular traditions were gradually being phased out. In 1966, participation in the Cadet Corps, which had been a bastion of UTS tradition, became optional; in 1972, the "new administration" announced that the cadet corps would be discontinued. Instead, it became an "open" corps, severing its affiliation with the school, and continues to this day. Change was also evident in the school's teaching staff: in the 1960s alone, 35 new teachers were hired, compared to only 15 hirings during the 1950s.

Donald Gutteridge had originally arrived in 1962 at MacMurray's request, and had taught Grade 13 English. In 1972, Gutteridge succeeded MacMurray. Although he was the school's fifth headmaster, he was the first to call himself a "principal". During his tenure as the premier of Ontario, Bill Davis came under fire for publicly funding UTS, which Liberal education critic Tom Reed called an "elitist" institution. Under pressure from the provincial government and the University of Toronto, a decision was made to admit girls into the school. Two proposals were tabled: the first involved expanding the school by maintaining the same number of incoming boys, and the second involved maintaining the class size by reducing the number of incoming boys. On January 18, 1973, the University of Toronto approved the second proposal, paving the way for a co-educational UTS the following academic year.The first two co-educational cohorts totalled 70 students; each cohort was divided into two classes of 35 students. In spite of initial concerns about the watered-down quality of UTS boys athletics, the junior girls basketball team won a city title in 1978. In order to assist families in financial need, the UTS Endowment Fund was set up in 1980; in 1989, approximately $50,000 was distributed to students in need.

In April 1993, the New Democratic government of Ontario announced the withdrawal of public funding from the school, leading to a dramatic rise in tuition costs, and prompting the mobilization of all its constituencies to make up the loss.

In 2004, UTS became an ancillary unit of the University of Toronto separate from the Ontario Institute for Studies in Education. The school formed its own board of directors representing alumni, parents and the university administration. Throughout the 2009–2010 school year, the school celebrated its centennial year with the Kickoff celebration at Varsity Stadium and the Homecoming weekend to be held in the school itself. The centennial year also saw the introduction of its new school song, written by Nathalie Siah '10, the House Centennial spirit pennant, as well as the House Cup, awarding the House who collected the most points (athletic, literary, and spirit) over the school year.

In 2015, Anand Mahadevan, a teacher at University of Toronto Schools, was the recipient of the Prime Minister's Awards for Teaching Excellence. In 2023, Isabella Liu, another teacher at University of Toronto Schools, received the Prime Minister's Awards for Teaching Excellence in STEM.

=== Relocation and redevelopment ===
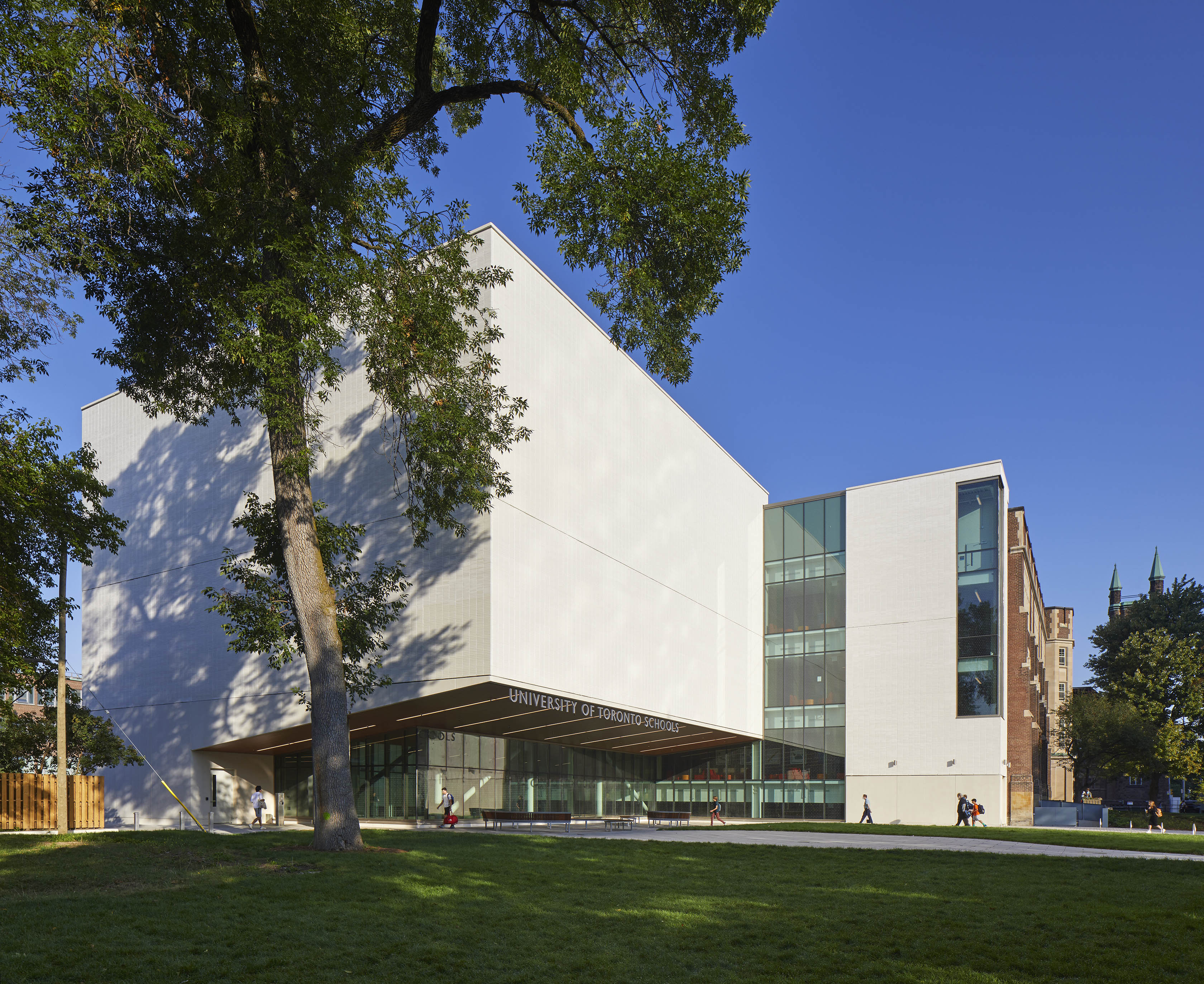
The southeast corner in 2022

The University of Toronto informed UTS in 2011 that it was rejecting its proposal for a $48 million refurbishment of its facilities and that the university intended to reclaim the property at 371 Bloor Street West for its own use. UTS had been given until 2021 to find and move to new space. However, in 2014, it was announced by the chair of the UTS board of directors that the University of Toronto and UTS were negotiating to maintain an affiliation between the two institutions and keep the school at its present location but redevelop the site so that it could meet the needs of both the university and the school.

In December 2015, the University of Toronto and UTS announced a 50-year agreement that would renew the school's official affiliation with the university, allow UTS to remain on its Bloor Street campus, redevelop 60,000 square feet of its space as well as build a 60,000 square foot addition. The redevelopment proposal included the construction of a 700-seat auditorium that functions as a university classroom, as well as a double gym, a light-filled atrium and a black box theatre. The university retained ownership of the building and land but UTS paid for construction and operating costs. The agreement was subject to approval by the university's governing council.

In 2017, UTS began fundraising for a redevelopment of the Bloor Street campus, under a campaign title of "Building the Future". The fundraising goal was $60 million. The redevelopment includes the creation of four new science labs, a media lab, an innovation lab and stunning visual arts rooms. In preparation for the redevelopment, UTS was relocated to a temporary campus at 30 Humbert St. The school remained at the Humbert Street location until the week of April 4, 2022, when it returned to its original Bloor Street campus location.

In April 2024, a student was seriously injured from a 40-foot fall at the school. No further information was disclosed to the cause.

== Admissions ==
Most students enter in Grade 7 through a two-stage competitive process. There is a UTS Test and an interview with multiple staff members and UTS alumni (using an MMI format).

== Academics ==
UTS is attended by students from grades 7 through 12, with 78 students per grade in classes graduating before 2001, 104 students per grade in classes graduating before 2009, and 110 in classes graduating thereafter.

UTS has enriched courses and a specialized curriculum, which are designed to challenge and educate at a higher level than at most public and many independent schools. Because potential UTS candidates are required to pass a rigorous entrance examination to attend the school, its curriculum is accelerated on the assumption that its students assimilate information faster. For this reason several higher-grade subjects are taught at lower grade levels. For example, Grade 10 students can take an enriched version of Ontario's Grade 11 courses in introductory physics, biology, and/or chemistry and Grade 7 students take both the Ontario grade 7 curriculum and grade 8 curriculum. As well, effort is made to enrich classes with extra material and more in-depth discussions. Similarly, in some courses, Grade 8 students will take the Ontario grade 9 curriculum.

UTS offers Advanced Placement courses, but does not have an International Baccalaureate program. In addition to the Ontario Secondary School Diploma, graduates earn a UTS Diploma, which signifies the completion of certain specialized courses and attesting to an attainment level beyond the provincial standards.

UTS's rate of student achievement is commensurate with its selective admissions policy, both in academics and in extracurricular activities. Virtually all UTS students go on to university following graduation. The school's alumni include 22 Rhodes Scholars and two Nobel Prize winners: chemist John Polanyi and economist Michael Spence.

== Student body ==
UTS incorporates a student leadership structure involving elected "School Captains," a student council, and a house system. The school describes leadership as a "muscle to be strengthened", encouraging a growth mindset among the student body.

The school captains serve as the primary representatives of the student body and are elected annually by their peers. The role is defined by traits such as integrity, collaboration, and resilience. The captains take an active part in school wide transitions and governance. For instance, during the shift to online learning necessitated by the COVID-19 pandemic, the school captains collaborated directly with school staff, the UTS Board, and the UTS Parents' Association (UTSPA).

Each grade elects representatives to the student council, which works with the school administration to propose and amend policies intended to improve the student experience. Additionally, the student body is organized into four houses, with each house overseen by four student leaders.

The school's co-curricular program is driven largely by student initiative. Many clubs and organizations are student-proposed and feature leadership teams that operate under the guidance of staff advisors. Senior students also take on leadership roles, providing mentorship to students in younger grades during experiential education outings.

== Notable alumni ==
- Brig-Gen. Donald Agnew, CBE, CD, Commandant of the Royal Military College of Canada
- Chris Alexander, former Minister of Citizenship and Immigration and former ambassador to Afghanistan
- Jay Bahadur, journalist and author
- Charles Baillie, OC, chancellor of Queen's University, former CEO of TD Bank
- Henry J. M. Barnett, CC, neurologist
- Rod Beattie, actor
- John Brewin, Member of Parliament
- Ian Brodie, Chief of staff for prime minister Stephen Harper
- Timothy Brook, historian
- Catherine Bush, novelist
- J. M. S. Careless, OC, OOnt, FRSC, historian and biographer, two-time winner of the Governor General's Award
- Michael Cassidy (Canadian politician), leader of the New Democratic Party of Ontario
- Noah Cowan, artistic director
- Jim Chamberlin, Chief designer of the Avro Arrow
- Sujit Choudhry, law professor and former dean of the UC Berkeley School of Law
- Irene Cybulsky, lawyer, former cardiac surgeon and head of cardiac surgery at McMaster University Medical School
- Paul Davis, sailor and bronze medallist (racing for Norway) at 2000 Summer Olympic Games
- John Duffy, political strategist
- John Evans, CC, Rhodes Scholar, medical leader and former University of Toronto president
- Robert Elgie, CM, MPP and Ontario cabinet minister
- Mark Evans, rower and gold medallist in pairs sculling at 1984 Los Angeles Olympics
- Cassandra Extavour, geneticist, classical singer, and Harvard University professor
- Bob Ezrin, OC, music producer
- James Fleck, CC, businessman and philanthropist
- David Frum, journalist and author
- David Galloway, CEO of Torstar and chairman of the Bank of Montreal
- George R. Gardiner, OC, businessman and co-founder of the Gardiner Museum
- Thomas Gayford, equestrian and Olympic gold medallist
- Peter George, CM, former president of McMaster University
- Chris Giannou, CM, war surgeon, former Chief Surgeon of the International Committee of the Red Cross, and author
- Donald B. Gillies, computer scientist
- Peter Godsoe, OC, former chairman of The Bank of Nova Scotia
- Ian Goldberg, computer scientist and cryptographer
- Laurie Graham, CM, Olympic downhill skier, Alpine Champion
- Joe Greene, DFC, PC, QC, Minister of Agriculture and Minister of Energy, Mines and Resources
- Doug Hamilton, rower and bronze medallist at 1984 Los Angeles Olympics
- John Ellis Hare, author and scholar of French-Canadian literature and history
- Lawrence Hill, author and essayist
- Greg Hollingshead, CM, novelist and winner of the Governor General's Award for Fiction
- Thomas Hurka, philosopher
- Hal Jackman, OC, OOnt, businessman and former lieutenant governor of Ontario
- Dennis Lee, OC, poet
- Pericles Lewis, literature professor and dean of Yale College
- Simu Liu, actor
- John Macfarlane, magazine editor
- Thomas MacMillan, chairman of Gluskin Sheff and President and CEO of CIBC Mellon
- C. B. Macpherson, OC, political theorist
- Jack McClelland, CC, publisher
- Claire Messud, novelist
- Lydia Millet, author
- Mavor Moore, CC, OBC, writer, producer, and public servant
- Dunc Munro, hockey player, Stanley Cup winner, and Olympic gold medallist
- Fraser Mustard, CC, OOnt, FRSC, medical pioneer and founder of the Canadian Institute for Advanced Research
- William Thornton Mustard, OC, MBE, cardiac surgeon
- Kevin Pho, internist and founder of KevinMD.com
- John C. Polanyi, PC, CC, Nobel Prize winner for Chemistry, 1986
- Dana Porter, Attorney General of Ontario and Chief Justice of the Court of Appeal for Ontario
- John ("Red") Porter, Canadian Olympian
- Julian Porter, lawyer and chairman of the Toronto Transit Commission
- Donald Redelmeier, internist, Professor of Medicine at University of Toronto, noted expert in medical decision making
- John Riddell, Marxist writer and former leader of the League for Socialist Action
- John Josiah Robinette, CC, OOnt, litigator and constitutional lawyer, Chancellor of Trent University
- Edward S. Rogers Sr., inventor and radio pioneer
- Robert Gordon Rogers, OC, OBC, 24th lieutenant governor of British Columbia and Chancellor of the University of Victoria
- Ilana Rubel, minority leader of the Idaho House of Representatives
- Peter H. Russell, CC, political scientist
- Arthur Scace, CM, QC, lawyer and jurist
- Donald Schmitt, architect
- J. Blair Seaborn, CM, diplomat
- Robert Seaborn, MC, Anglican Bishop of Newfoundland and Metropolitan of Canada
- Jeffrey Simpson, OC, journalist
- Charles Snelling, national figure skating champion and surgeon
- James Sommerville, horn player and conductor
- Raymond Souster, OC, poet and winner of the Governor General's Award
- A. Michael Spence, Nobel Prize winner for Economics, 2001
- Wishart Spence, CC, OBE, puisne justice of the Supreme Court of Canada
- C. P. Stacey, OC, OBE, FRSC, historian
- Harry Stinson, real estate developer
- William W. Stinson, chairman of Canadian Pacific Railway and Sun Life Financial
- Ian Strachan, MPP and chief government whip
- Joseph Albert Sullivan, Olympic gold medallist, physician, and Senator
- Wayne Sumner, philosophy professor and member of the Royal Society of Canada
- Thomas Symons, CC, OOnt, FRSC, founding president of Trent University
- Geza Tatrallyay, Olympic fencer and author
- John Tory, OOnt, former leader of the Progressive Conservative Party of Ontario and 65th Mayor of Toronto
- John A. Tory, former financial advisor to Ken Thomson
- Paul Tough, editor at the New York Times Magazine
- Jacob Tsimerman, 2026 Fields Medallist
- Garth Turner, Conservative, then independent, then Liberal MP
- Jessica Ware, entomologist
- Brig. William Denis Whitaker, CM, DSO and Bar, ED, CD, athlete, soldier, businessman, and author
- Graham Yost, screenwriter of Speed, Broken Arrow, Hard Rain, and two-time Emmy winner

== See also ==
- Education in Ontario
- List of secondary schools in Ontario
