= Annie Isabella Hamilton =

Canadian physician

Annie Isabella Hamilton (1866–1941) was a Canadian physician and the first woman to receive a medical degree in Nova Scotia. She earned a degree in medicine (MD ChM) from Dalhousie University in 1894.

== Early life and education ==
Annie Isabella Hamilton was born in 1866 in Brookfield, Nova Scotia. When she was 14, she raised money for a local missionary society in Brookfield.

Hamilton attended Pictou Academy, which awarded her a gold medal for educational excellence, and received a degree from Truro Normal School (later Nova Scotia Teachers College). She enrolled in the medical program at Dalhousie University in 1888, after the death of her parents. She excelled academically, earning particularly high grades in botany and histology. She also studied Chinese and campaigned unsuccessfully for a smoke-free campus. Some of Hamilton's male Dalhousie classmates criticized her supposedly unfeminine dress and appearance, and created a petition to obtain a bustle for her.

== Career ==
Hamilton set up a practice in Halifax after graduation. In 1895, she assisted Maria Louisa Angwin, the first woman licensed to practice medicine in Nova Scotia, in a series of lectures on hygiene. In 1903, she moved to China, where she served as a medical missionary and teacher, and wrote textbooks for her university students. She died in Shanghai in 1941.
