= Canadian Geotechnical Journal =

- Discipline: Geotechnical engineering, geoenvironmental engineering
- Language: English, French
- Edited by: Greg Siemens and Charles W.W. Ng

Publication details
- History: 1963–present
- Publisher: NRC Research Press (Canada)
- Frequency: Monthly
- Impact factor: 3.725 (2020)

Standard abbreviations
- ISO 4: Can. Geotech. J.

Indexing
- ISSN: 1208-6010

Links
- Journal homepage

The Canadian Geotechnical Journal has been published since 1963 by NRC Research Press. It is a monthly journal featuring papers related to geotechnical and geoenvironmental engineering as well as applied sciences. Papers are loaded to the Web site in advance of the printed issues. The editors in chief are Greg Siemens and Charles W. W. Ng. The Canadian Geotechnical Society has chosen the Canadian Geotechnical Journal as its principal medium of publication of geotechnical, geological, hydrogeological, cold regions geotechnical, and geoenvironmental papers.
