= James Fleck =

Canadian businessman and academic

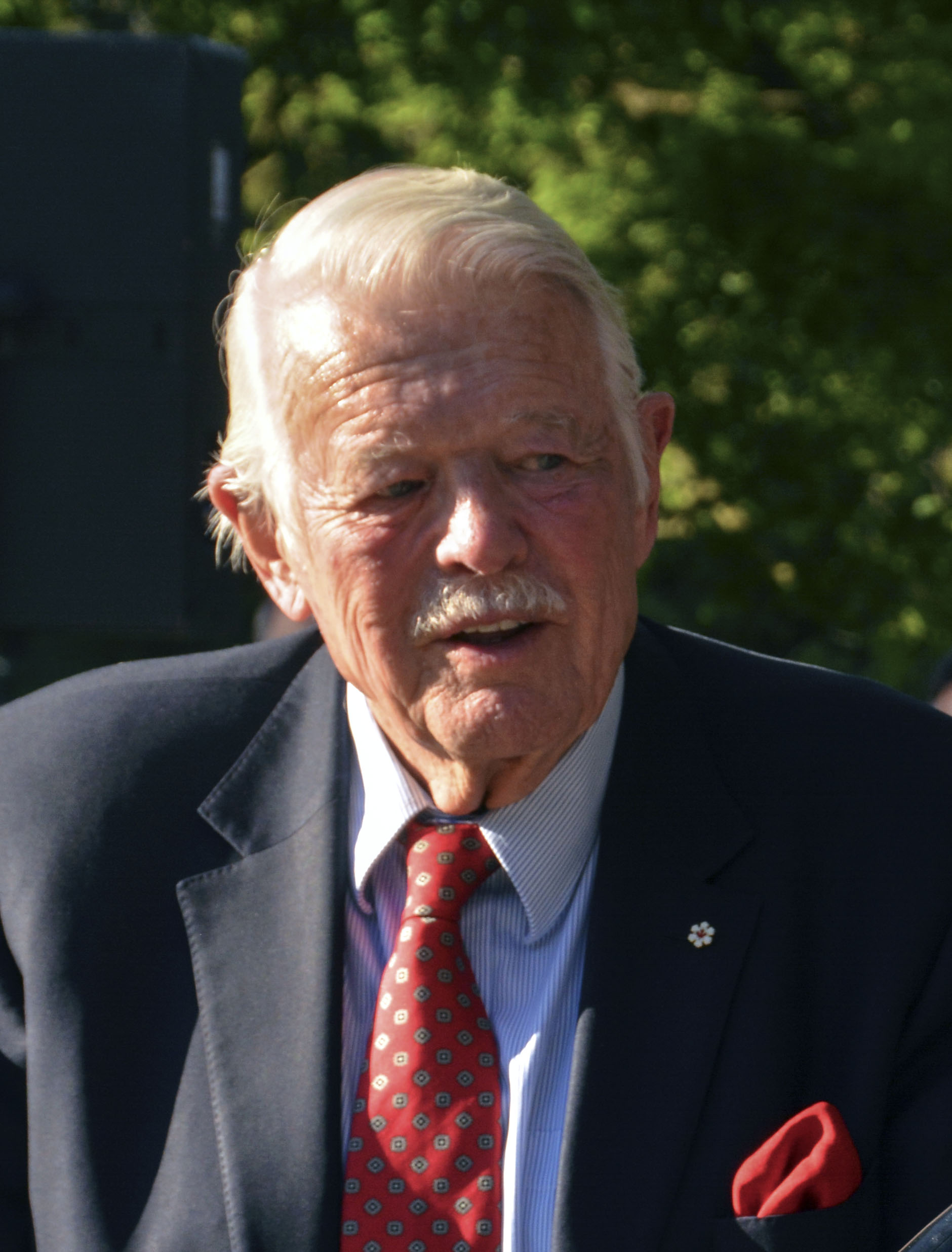
Fleck in 2017

James Douglas Fleck (born February 10, 1931), sometimes known as Jim Fleck, is a Canadian businessman and academic.

== Personal life ==
Fleck was born in Toronto, Ontario, Canada on February 10, 1931, to Robert Douglas and Norma Marie Fleck.

He married Margaret Evelyn Fleck (née Humprhys) in 1953. They have four children. In 1984, Margaret Fleck was ordained as a priest in the Anglican Church of Canada. She passed away in 2019.

Fleck is a private collector and arts donor.

== Education ==
Fleck was educated at the University of Toronto Schools. He earned a BA (1953) from the University of Western Ontario. In 1964, he attended Harvard University as a Ford Foundation fellow. At Harvard, he was awarded a doctorate of business administration in finance (1964) with a doctoral thesis on the investment policies of Canadian life insurance companies.

== Career ==
=== Business ===
Fleck was chair and CEO of Fleck Manufacturing Inc., a company he founded, manufacturer of wire and cable, power cords and wiring assemblies for the appliance, automotive and electronic industries with plants in Canada, Mexico and the US, for forty years until it was acquired by Noma Industries Limited in 1994.

He was director of Promis Systems Corporation Limited until it was acquired by PRI Automation in March 2000. He was a director of many other public and private companies including Certicom Inc., Rogers Multimedia Ltd., Zurich Insurance, Travellers Insurance, Channel 47 Inc., and Colonial Homes Ltd.

Fleck was also active in the Young Presidents' Organization and was its international president in 1972-73.

==== Fleck Strike of 1978 ====
Fleck was not active CEO of Fleck Manufacturing during the Fleck Strike of 1978, which was a reaction against extremely poor working conditions and raised "women's issues" to new importance in union politics.

Fleck was at this time the Deputy Minister of Industry and Tourism of Ontario. The Ontario Provincial Police used extreme force to suppress the striking workers. It was later revealed that at the time of this strike, Fleck and his family still owned half of the company.

=== Teaching and writing ===
Fleck was on the faculty of the Harvard Business School teaching first-year finance in the MBA Program from 1964–1966. He was associate dean in the Faculty of Administrative Studies and director of the MBA program at York University.

He has also taught, as a visiting professor, at the Keio University Business School of Tokyo and the European Institute of Business Administration in Fontainebleu, as well as teaching courses in corporate finance, business policy and business/government relations. From 1976 to 1978 he was a visiting professor at the Harvard Kennedy School.

In June 2002, he was awarded an honorary Doctor of Laws degree by the University of Toronto and in September 2010, he was awarded an honorary Doctor of Literature degree by the University of Trinity College.

His publications include Business Can Succeed!, Understanding the Political Environment (with Isaiah A. Litvak), Canada Can Compete!, Strategic Management of the Canadian Industrial Portfolio (with Joseph R. D'Cruz), Institute for Research on Public Policy and Yankee Canadians in the Global Economy: Strategic Management of U.S. Subsidiaries under Free Trade. He has co-authored with Joseph D'Cruz several articles for Business Quarterly, one of which, "The Globalization of Manufacturing", received the Silver Medal in the Deloitte & Touche Best of the Best Awards covering the first thirty years of the Business Quarterly.

=== Government ===
In the late 1960s, he was executive director and member of the Committee on Government Productivity (COGP), responsible for carrying out a study that led to a major re-organization of the Government of Ontario. Prior to joining the COGP, he served on the Federal Department of Transport Task Force on Goals and Objectives.

During 1974 and 1975 was the secretary of the cabinet and for the two previous years CEO of the Office of the Premier of Ontario. From 1976 until 1978, he was deputy minister of Industry and Tourism for the Government of Ontario.

He was a founding director of the Public Policy Forum, was active in the Niagara Institute, was chair of BCNI's Steering Committee on Constitutional Reform, and was a director of the Institute for Research on Public Policy.

In 2013 he was awarded the title of "Legend of the OPS" with a square on the Ontario Public Service quilt dedicated in his honour. In May 2014, he was awarded the Lieutenant Governor's Medal of Distinction in Public Service, Ontario's highest honour for public service.

He was presented the Queen Elizabeth II Silver Jubilee Medal in 1977, the Queen Elizabeth II Golden Jubilee Medal in 2002, and the Queen's Diamond Jubilee Medal in 2012.

Fleck as appointed an Officer of the Order of Canada in 1997 and promoted to Companion to the Order of Canada in 2015.
