= Kevin Pho =

American physician

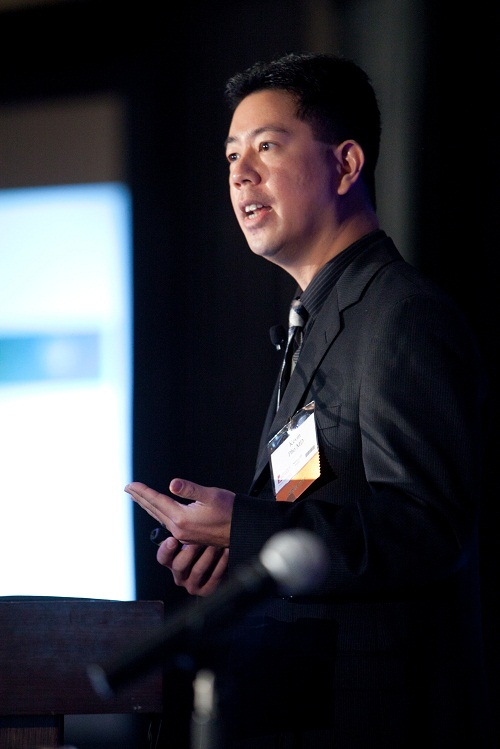
- Pho in 2012
- Born: Princeton, New Jersey, U.S.
- Education: Boston University (BA, MD)
- Occupations: Internal medicine physician, blogger, commentator
- Website: KevinMD.com

Kevin Pho is an American physician of internal medicine, media commentator, public speaker, and author. He is the founder and editor of KevinMD.com, a website aimed at medical professionals.

Pho writes on issues of medical technology in practice, doctors and patients engaging one another online, and how physicians can cultivate online reputations. His writings have been published in USA Today, CNN.com, and The New York Times, among others. He is also the co-author of the book Establishing, Managing, and Protecting Your Online Reputation: A Social Media Guide for Physicians and Medical Practices.

== Early life and education ==
Pho was born in Princeton, New Jersey. He grew up in Sarnia, Ontario, where he attended Gregory A. Hogan Catholic School, then moved to Richmond Hill, Ontario, where he went to high school at University of Toronto Schools.

He attended Boston University where he earned his B.A./M.D. in 1999, after which he completed the Internal Medicine Residency Program at Boston University Medical Center.

== Career ==
=== Medical career and KevinMD ===
In 2004, Pho started the blog, KevinMD, in response to positive feedback from patients who read his blog post about the Vioxx recall. He had previously worked as a researcher for Google Answers, where he would answer questions by patients, and realized that patients did not seem to be getting the information they needed in the examination room.

Pho frequently writes about the benefits of physicians using social media as a way to help patients locate reliable information about healthcare and to communicate issues with medicine to the public and among colleagues. Over 1,000 healthcare professionals contribute articles to KevinMD.com.

In 2009, his blog received 1.4 million unique visitors. That year, Pho raised $1,000 to support the United Way of Greater Nashua by using his Twitter and Facebook profiles.

Pho received criticism for posting an article about a surgeon whose supervisor intentionally harmed a patient during vascular surgery in order to provide a teaching opportunity. Pho removed the story after it was determined to be fiction and apologized for not vetting its truth.

As of 2018, he practices in Nashua, New Hampshire, with the St. Joseph Hospital Adult Medicine (formerly named the Nashua Medical Group).

=== Writing and public speaking ===
Pho has appeared as a keynote speaker and panel member for the Massachusetts Medical Society, The New England Journal of Medicine, Texas Medical Association, BlogWorld, New Media Expo, the Association of Staff Physician Recruiters, The Pri Med South Annual Conference, The American Orthopaedic Association, Pain Week, the WSMA 2016 Annual Meeting, Planetree International Conference on Patient-Centered Care, and the College of American Pathologists Pathologists' Meeting

Pho is on USA Today's board of contributors. He is also a contributor to The New York Times' "Room for Debate" and CNN.

In 2013, Pho published Establishing, Managing, and Protecting Your Online Reputation: A Social Media Guide for Physicians and Medical Practices. The book provides tips and testimonials for doctors using social media.

== Reception ==
Pho blogs on KevinMD.com was called a "must-read blog" by Rebecca Ruiz of Forbes. His Twitter account was recommended by CNN, The Guardian, and by Stat News. His opinion pieces appear in multiple print and online media sources.

In February 2010, Pho was listed in the New Hampshire Union Leader's ‘Top 40 Under 40.’ In January 2012, Pho was listed on Klout as the #1 healthcare social media influencer and #1 social media influencer in medicine.

In 2017 and 2018, he was named as one of New Hampshire magazine's Top Doctors. The list is determined based on a survey of all practicing physicians in the state of New Hampshire, asking them which doctor they would choose to provide medical care to a friend or a loved one. He was again named a top doctor by the publication in 2019.
