= Sydney Segal =

Canadian pediatrician and neonatologist

- Born: 1920; Montreal, Quebec
- Died: June 21, 1997 (aged 76–77); Vancouver, British Columbia
- Occupations: pediatrician and neonatologist
- Known for: His work with sudden infant death syndrome

Sydney Segal, CM OBC (1920 – June 21, 1997) was a Canadian pediatrician and neonatologist. He was "actively involved in the areas of medical ethics, fetal medicine, drug-addicted newborns, respiratory pediatrics, children with AIDS and sudden infant death syndrome".

Born in Montreal, Quebec, Segal received a Bachelor of Science degree from McGill University in 1941 and then served in World War II. He received his medical degree in 1950 from Queen's University and received a Master of Arts degree in Physiology from the University of British Columbia in 1954. He did his internship and residency at the Vancouver General Hospital. He was a research and teaching fellow at the University of British Columbia, Boston Lying-in Hospital, the Children's Hospital Boston, and Harvard Medical School. In 1956, he received his Certification in Paediatrics from the Royal College of Physicians and Surgeons of Canada.

In 1956, he joined the attending staff of Vancouver General Hospital and was appointed an instructor in the Department of Paediatrics in the Faculty of Medicine at the University of British Columbia. He was appointed a Professor in 1968 and a Professor Emeritus in 1985.

In 1973, Segal was one of the founders of The Canadian Foundation for the Study of Infant Deaths and helped with first Canadian SIDS conference held in 1974. He helped open the first intensive-care unit for newborns at Vancouver General Hospital.

In 1989, he was made a Member of the Order of Canada in recognition for having "made a lifelong contribution to the welfare of children everywhere". In 1993, he was made a member of the Order of British Columbia.

Segal died in Vancouver, British Columbia in 1997.
