= Noura Khalifa Al Suwaidi =

Noura Khalifa Al Suwaidi (also known as Noora bint Khaleefa Salem Al Suwaidi) is an Emirati politician, former deputy minister and director-general of General Women’s Union, whose chairperson is Fatima bint Mubarak Al Ketbi. In 2016, she was awarded the 6th Arab Woman Award.

== Career ==
Around 2005, Al Suwaidi was appointed UAE's Deputy Minister for Foreign Affairs. She is known for her efforts in founding the Arab Women Organisation and was made the director of General Women’s Union, which has as its chairperson, Mother of the UAE, Fatima bint Mubarak Al Ketbi. Al Suwaidi is of the view that the condition of women in Emirates is the best in the Gulf region.

Under her, the General Women's Union signed an MoU with the Emirati Telecommunications Regulatory Authority for promoting women's empowerment by the use of Information and communications technology. At the 2014 session of United Nations Commission on the Status of Women, she affirmed that the provisions of Beijing and Cairo declarations will be maintained by UAE. In recognition of her work for women's welfare, the Arab Women Foundation gave its 6th Arab Woman Award to Al Suwaidi in 2016.
