= Biochemistry and Cell Biology =

- Discipline: biochemistry, cell biology, molecular biology,
- Language: English, French
- Edited by: James R. Davie, Christopher J. Nelson

Publication details
- History: 1964–present
- Publisher: NRC Research Press
- Frequency: bimonthly
- Impact factor: 3.626 (2020)

Standard abbreviations
- ISO 4: Biochem. Cell Biol.

Indexing
- ISSN: 1208-6002

Links
- Journal homepage

Biochemistry and Cell Biology is a peer-reviewed scientific journal of biochemistry and cell biology established in 1964 by NRC Research Press and currently published by Canadian Science Publishing. It is the continuation of Canadian Journal of Biochemistry and Physiology which split into Canadian Journal of Biochemistry and Canadian Journal of Physiology and Pharmacology in 1964. In 1983, Canadian Journal of Biochemistry was renamed Canadian Journal of Biochemistry and Cell Biology and acquired its current name Biochemistry and Cell Biology in 1986.

The journal is edited by James R. Davie (University of Manitoba) and Christopher J. Nelson (University of Victoria). The journal is affiliated with the Canadian Society for Molecular Biosciences and the Panamerican Association for Biochemistry and Molecular Biology.

== Abstracting and indexing ==
- Biochemistry and Biophysics Citation Index
- Biological & Agricultural Index Plus
- Biomedical Reference Collection
- BIOSIS
- CAB Abstracts
- Chemical Abstracts
- Compendex
- Current Abstracts
- Current Awareness in Biological Sciences
- Current Contents
- Derwent Biotechnology Abstracts
- Elsevier BIOBASE
- EMBASE
- Genetics Abstracts
- MEDLINE
- Science Citation Index
