= Noura Hashemi =

Iranian actress (born 1983)

- نورا هاشمی

Noura Hashemi Gharmezi (Persian: نورا هاشمی قرمزی; born September 22, 1983) is an Iranian film, theater and television actress.

She is the daughter of Mehdi Hashemi and Gulab Adineh and the ex-wife of cinema director Siavash Asadi.

She started her professional career as an actress for the first time in 2002 with the film Miss. She has acted in six movies, one series and two plays.

== Awards ==
- Statue of Hafez celebration of the best actress in the movie Pocket on South Street
- Statue of Fajr Theatre award for "Eliza" in "Banooye Mahboob Man"
