= Applied Physiology, Nutrition, and Metabolism =

- Discipline: Physiology, nutrition, metabolism, human health, physical activity
- Language: English, French
- Edited by: Phil Chilibeck and Scott Harding

Publication details
- Former names: Canadian Journal of Sport Sciences, Canadian Journal of Applied Physiology
- History: 1976–present
- Publisher: Canadian Science Publishing (Canada)
- Frequency: Continuous
- Open access: Hybrid

Standard abbreviations
- ISO 4: Appl. Physiol. Nutr. Metab.

Indexing
- ISSN: 1715-5312 (print); 1715-5320 (web)
- OCLC no.: 65195853

Links
- Journal homepage; Online access; Online archive

Applied Physiology, Nutrition, and Metabolism/Physiologie appliquée, nutrition et métabolisme is a peer reviewed medical journal published by Canadian Science Publishing. It was established in 1976 as the Canadian Journal of Sport Sciences and was later renamed Canadian Journal of Applied Physiology before obtaining its current name.

It covers research on physiology, nutrition, and metabolism aspects of human health, physical activity, and fitness. It has yearly volume issues, and publishes topic collections. Papers are published "Just-in" (or ahead of print) upon acceptance in advance of the final paper, which is then published in the volume issue. Papers are available in both PDF and HTML formats.

The editor-in-chiefs are Phil Chilibeck, Ph.D. and Scott Harding, Ph.D. It is an official journal of the Canadian Society for Exercise Physiology, the Canadian Nutrition Society., and Exercise and Sports Science Australia (ESSA)

== Abstracting and indexing ==
The journal is abstracted and indexed in:

- Current Contents/Life Sciences
- Excerpta Medica
- MEDLINE/PubMed
- Nutrition Abstracts and Reviews Series A: Human and Experimental
- Physical Education Index
- Science Citation Index Expanded
- Scopus
