= Canadian Society of Soil Science =

Canadian non-profit organization

- Société Canadienne de science du sol
- Abbreviation: CSSS
- Formation: 1954
- Type: Non-governmental organization
- Website: csss.ca

The Canadian Society of Soil Science (CSSS) is a non-governmental, non-profit organization for scientists, engineers, technologists, administrators and students involved in professional soil science. Its goal is to nurture the discipline of soil science in Canada.

== Administration ==
The Society is administered by a 9-member Council consisting of a President, President-Elect, Past-President, Secretary, Treasurer, two Councillors (Western and Eastern Councillor), Graduate Student Representative, and the Editor of the Canadian Journal of Soil Science. Council meets once annually, at the Annual Meeting, and conducts ongoing e-mail correspondence and business motions throughout the year. The Annual Meeting consists of both Scientific and Business Meetings, and concludes with an Awards Banquet.

=== 2023 Council ===
- Amanda Diochon (President)
- Asim Biswas (Past President)
- Richard Farrell (President Elect)
- Lee-Ann Wilson (Secretary)
- Diane Knight (Treasurer)
- Henry Chau (Western Councillor)
- Adrian Unc (Eastern Councillor)
- Blake Weiseth (Student Representative)
- Anne Naeth (CJSS Editor)

=== 2022 Council ===
- Asim Biswas (President)
- Angela Bedard-Haughn (Past President)
- Amanda Diochon (President Elect)
- Lee-Ann Wilson (Secretary)
- Diane Knight (Treasurer)
- Henry Chau (Western Councillor)
- Louis-Pierre Comeau (Eastern Councillor)
- Erika Young (Student Representative)
- Anne Naeth (CJSS Editor)

=== 2021 Council ===
- Angela Bedard-Haughn (President)
- Nathan Basiliko (Past President)
- Asim Biswis (President Elect)
- Lee-Ann Wilson (Secretary)
- Diane Knight (Treasurer)
- Rich Farrell (Western Councillor)
- Louis-Pierre Comeau (Eastern Councillor)
- Erika Young (Student Representative)
- Anne Naeth (CJSS Editor)

== Publications ==
=== The Canadian Journal of Soil Science ===
The Canadian Journal of Soil Science (CJSS), established in 1921, is a quarterly journal that is international in scope and publishes fundamental and applied research from all areas of soil science around the world. These areas include traditional soil biology, physics, and chemistry; pedology; use, management, and development; soil and environment interactions; land reclamation and contaminant remediation. It draws from and interfaces with numerous fields such as agriculture, agrometeorology, ecology, engineering, environmental science, environmental stewardship, forestry, geography, geology, hydrology, land rehabilitation, landscape processes, mapping and evaluation, microbiology, soil-plant interactions, and urban uses.

The journal welcomes interdisciplinary works, particularly those linking soil with climate change, food security, and sustainable development goals. The journal publishes regular research articles, reviews (and mini-reviews), letters to the editor, discussions (comments and replies), short communications, special issues on important topics in the field of soil science, and occasionally conference proceedings and book reviews. The journal also publishes reviews, letters to the editor, and occasionally conference proceedings. Special issues, or special sections within regular issues dealing with specific topics, are also considered.

The journal is published by Canadian Science Publishing (CSP), Canada's independent, not-for-profit leader in mobilizing science-based knowledge, making it easy to discover, use, and share. As Canada's largest publisher of international scientific journals, CSP is committed to strengthening the integrity, relevance, reach, and impact of vital knowledge and research, across Canada and around the globe.

=== CSSS Newsletter ===
The CSSS Newsletter, published three to four times a year, is an information bulletin containing Society and member news. It is an informal forum through which CSSS members can share ideas and information and keep in touch with one another.

=== Books ===
The Canadian Society of Soil Science has sponsored several books such as:

- Digging Into Canadian Soils: An Introduction to Soil Science, an open access textbook edited by Maja Krzic, Frances L. Walley, Amanda Diochon, Maxime C. Paré, and Richard E. Farrell (2021) and published by the Canadian Society of Soil Science.
- Soil Sampling and Methods of Analysis, 2nd Edition edited by M.R. Carter and E.G. Gregorich (2008) and published by CRC Press and Taylor & Francis Group.
- Soil and Environmental Science Dictionary edited by E.G. Gregorich, L.W. Turchenek, M.R. Carter, and D.A. Angers (2001) CRC Press. Review of this book can be found at
- Soil Sampling and Methods of Analysis, 1st Edition edited by M.R. Carter (1993) and published by Lewis Publishers and CRC Press.

== Major Initiatives ==
- Annual conferences

- Vancouver, British Columbia - 2024
- Truro, Nova Scotia - 2023
- Edmonton, Alberta - 2022
- Charlottetown, Prince Edward Island - 2021 - virtual conference
- Charlottetown, Prince Edward Island - 2020 - cancelled due to COVID-19 pandemic
- Saskatoon, Saskatchewan - 2019
- Niagara Falls, Ontario - 2018
- Peterborough, Ontario - 2017
- Kamloops, British Columbia - 2016
- Montreal, Quebec - 2015
- Banff, Alberta - 2014
- Winnipeg, Manitoba - 2013

- Virtual Soil Science Learning Resources
- Summer Pedology School

== Committees ==
- CSSS Education Committee

The committee, established in 2014, has the goal to enhance soil science education in Canada at both the post-secondary and K-12 level. The committee has following objectives: (1) compile and disseminate information about the soil science courses and programs at Canadian postsecondary institutions, (2) enhance soil science education at the K-12 levels, (3) establish and maintain contacts with the international soil science community regarding new developments in soil science education, and (4) support informal education through communications and outreach with both specialists and the general public (including via social media).

The need for a Canadian soil science textbook had long been discussed by members of the Soil Education Committee of the Canadian Society of Soil Science, and in 2018, a proposal to forge ahead with the development of an introductory soil science textbook was enthusiastically supported by the membership of the CSSS at its annual general meeting. The textbook Digging Into Canadian Soils: An Introduction to Soil Science, available in both English and French, is the result of this community-wide endeavour. This open access textbook provides an introduction to the core sub-disciplines of soil science, and introduces the concepts and vocabulary needed by students just beginning their soil science journey. Additionally, the textbook provides supplementary materials that are regionally specific, or may be of specific interest beyond what might be considered core soil science disciplinary material. Importantly, the textbook also is intended to introduce students to the Canadian System of Soil Classification using examples from across Canada, the world's second largest country by area, and to the Canadian Society of Soil Science, whose members share a common passion for soil science and are keen to share and instill this passion with students across the country and beyond.

- CSSS Pedology Committee

The Pedology Committee of the Canadian Society of Soil Science (CSSS) was established in 2005. The committee has three mandates: (1) Improvement of the taxonomic classification system for Canadian soils through revision of the system because of new information, (2) Maintenance of contact with the international pedological community on new developments in soil genesis and classification, and (3) Compilation and dissemination of information about the genesis, distribution, classification and wise use of Canadian soils.

The Canadian Digital Soil Mapping Working Group (CDSMWG) was established in 2016 after an inaugural meeting at the CSSS Annual Meeting in Quebec City. In response to a call from the UN-Food and Agriculture Program for countries to contribute to a new global soil organic carbon map, the CDSMWG agreed to take the lead in the preparation and delivery of the Canadian contribution to this global initiative. The Soil Organic Carbon (SOC) Map of Canada was completed and submitted in 2017 for the 0–30 cm depth interval with contributions from researchers and organisations from across the country. The CDSMWG endeavors to continue improvements to the SOC map of Canada and expand the mapping to include other critical soil parameters.

The Pedology Committee is currently spearheading a revision of elements of the Canadian System of Soil Classification (CSSC) with a goal of producing a 4th edition. To date, the specific areas under consideration for revision include the inclusion of an order for human-disturbed soils, improved descriptions of A horizons and LFH horizons, and revisions to horizon nomenclature – especially around soils with deposition of secondary salts. Under the direction of the Classification Working Group, a new process for review and revision will be established. Venues for review will include discussion (at workshops and via online forums) and the sharing and vetting of proposed changes through peer-reviewed publication in the Canadian Journal of Soil Science.
