= Irene Cybulsky =

Canadian lawyer and cardiac surgeon

- Education: University of Toronto; Queen's University
- Occupations: Lawyer; former cardiac surgeon
- Employer: Hamilton Health Sciences (former)
- Known for: First woman in Canada to head a cardiac surgery division; successful human rights tribunal case

Irene Cybulsky is a Canadian lawyer and former cardiac surgeon. She was the first woman in Canada to be appointed head of a cardiac surgery division. After being dismissed from this position, she "represent[ed] herself in a human rights tribunal case against her former hospital", which was ultimately successful.

== Education ==
Cybulsky grew up in Toronto and was a member of the first co-education class at the University of Toronto Schools. She received her undergraduate and medical degrees from the University of Toronto. After a one-year surgical internship, Cybulsky applied for a residency position, which she did not receive, potentially due to her gender. She completed a master's degree in research science before being accepted to a general surgery and later a two-year cardiovascular and thoracic surgery residency at McMaster University.

== Career ==
By 1995 Cybulsky was employed at Hamilton General Hospital, starting as a clinical assistant and later becoming the director of the cardiac surgery residency program. She faced significant gender-based discrimination from male colleagues at the hospital. When she developed a deep vein thrombosis during a pregnancy in 1998, the administration initially refused to allow her to take sick leave but instead suggested she start maternity leave early. According to a profile in Toronto Life, "the experience taught her a lesson: organizations need policies to protect employees from discrimination".

Cybulsky was named head of cardiac surgery at Hamilton Health Sciences in 2009, becoming the first woman to ever hold such a position in Canada. In this role she led a reform of the referral process, which was unpopular among physicians; a later contentious hiring process she managed caused further unrest. Prompted by complaints from the unit's surgeons (including one who threatened to resign), Cybulsky's supervisor launched a divisional review process which recommended that Cybulsky receive communication training and coaching.

In 2015, Cybulsky's new supervisor informed her that he was "opening her position to new applicants"; she was ultimately dismissed in July 2016. She submitted a complaint to the Human Rights Tribunal of Ontario regarding her treatment by Hamilton Health Sciences. She then closed her surgical practice to begin a law degree at Queen's University, while representing herself in the tribunal process.

Cybulsky completed a Master in Public Administration at Queen's in 2010 and in 2020 received her law degree. In 2021 the human rights tribunal concluded that Hamilton Health Sciences breached Cybulsky's rights by ignoring her concerns regarding gender discrimination.
