= Noura Aljizawi =

Syrian opposition leader

Noura Aljizawi (formally Noura Al-Ameer al-Jizawi; Arabic: نورا الجيزاوي) is a Toronto-based academic, activist, spokesperson, former refugee, and Syrian political opposition leader.

== Early life ==
At the age of six, Aljizawi was obliged by the government of Syria to wear military-style uniforms. She noticed at school how many of her classmates' fathers had disappeared, later realizing they were detained and executed political prisoners.

== Life in Syria ==
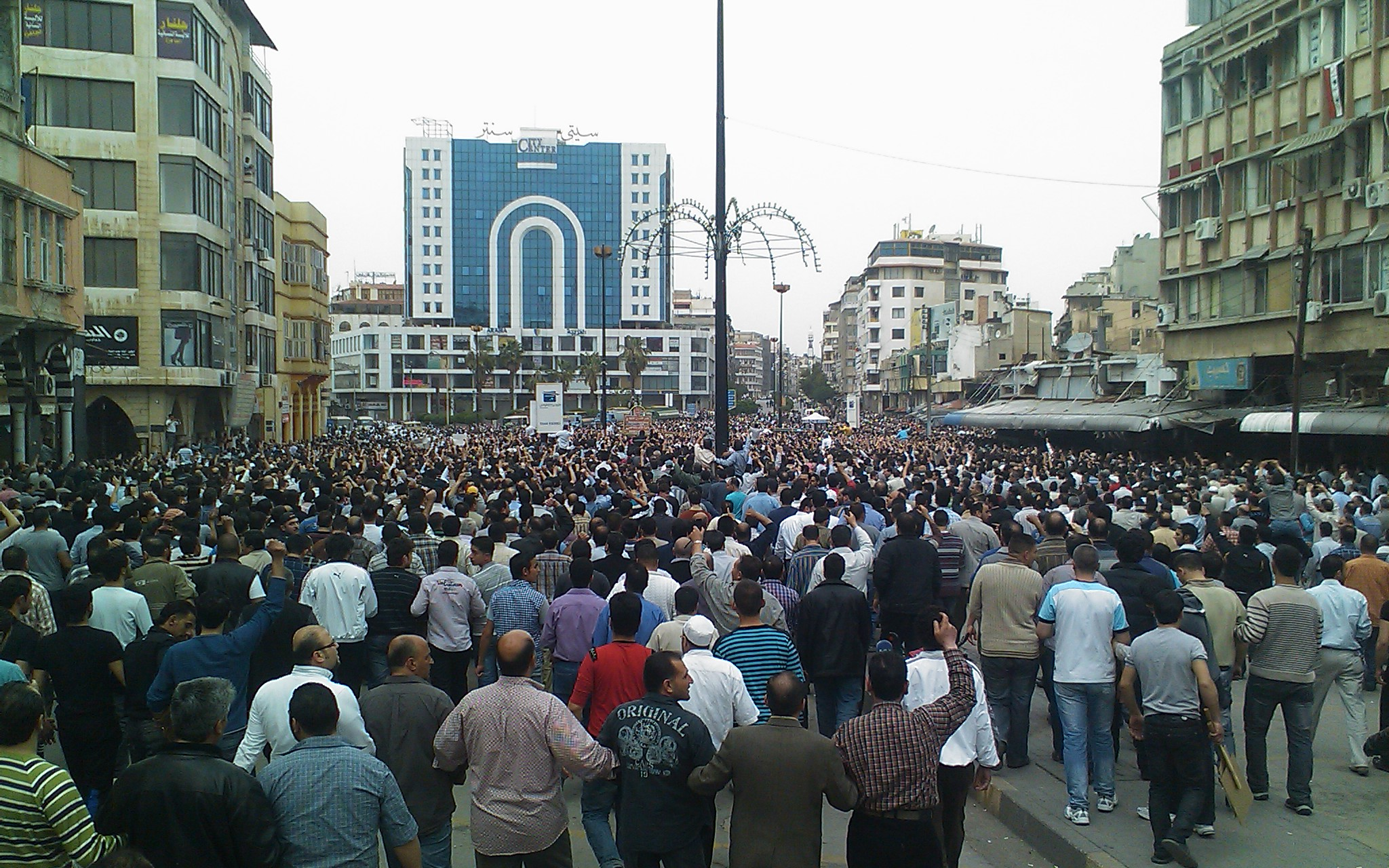
Anti government protest in Homs

In Damascus, Aljizawi studied for her master’s degree in comparative literature and at the same time spoke out about the leadership of Syrian President Assad and organized demonstrations. She wrote a blog critical of the President.

In 2011 Aljizawi led antigovernmental protests in Homs.

Her political activities resulted in her being arrested by the Damascus (215th) branch of Military Intelligence Directorate on 28 March 2012. Held in various prisons, she was tortured with electricity and interrogated for 12 hours per day. While under arrest she was denied access to a lawyer and contact with her family. Her captors threatened to harm her friends and family. Her laptop, which contained her evidence of graduation, was confiscated and her graduation and attendance records were deleted from university records by the Syrian state.

After an international campaign led by Reporters without Borders, she was released from jail in 2012 and she fled to Turkey.

== Life in Turkey ==
In 2014, Aljizawi was elected as the vice-president of the National Coalition for Syrian Revolutionary and Opposition Forces. In her role she led negotiation attempts, trying to find peace and justice.

In 2016, her email account was subjected to a hacking attempt that was thwarted by the University of Toronto's Citizen Lab.

She resigned from her role later in 2016, after concluding that negotiations were hopeless.

== Life in Canada ==
In 2017, Aljizawi was accepted to the University of Toronto scholars-at-risk program and relocated to Canada. She studied for a Masters in Global Affairs at the Munk School of Global Affairs. Her studied focus on Guinea’s malaria treatment and eradication program.

In February 2018, Aljizawi traveled to Geneva to give evidence to the United Nations Human Rights Council about the situation in Syria.

In 2021 Aljizawi was thanked in the International Journal of Communication for her support with documenting online misinformation.

== Family life ==
Aljizawi lives with her husband and they have one daughter born in 2015.
