= Phospholipase A-2-activating protein =

Protein-coding gene in the species Homo sapiens

PLAA
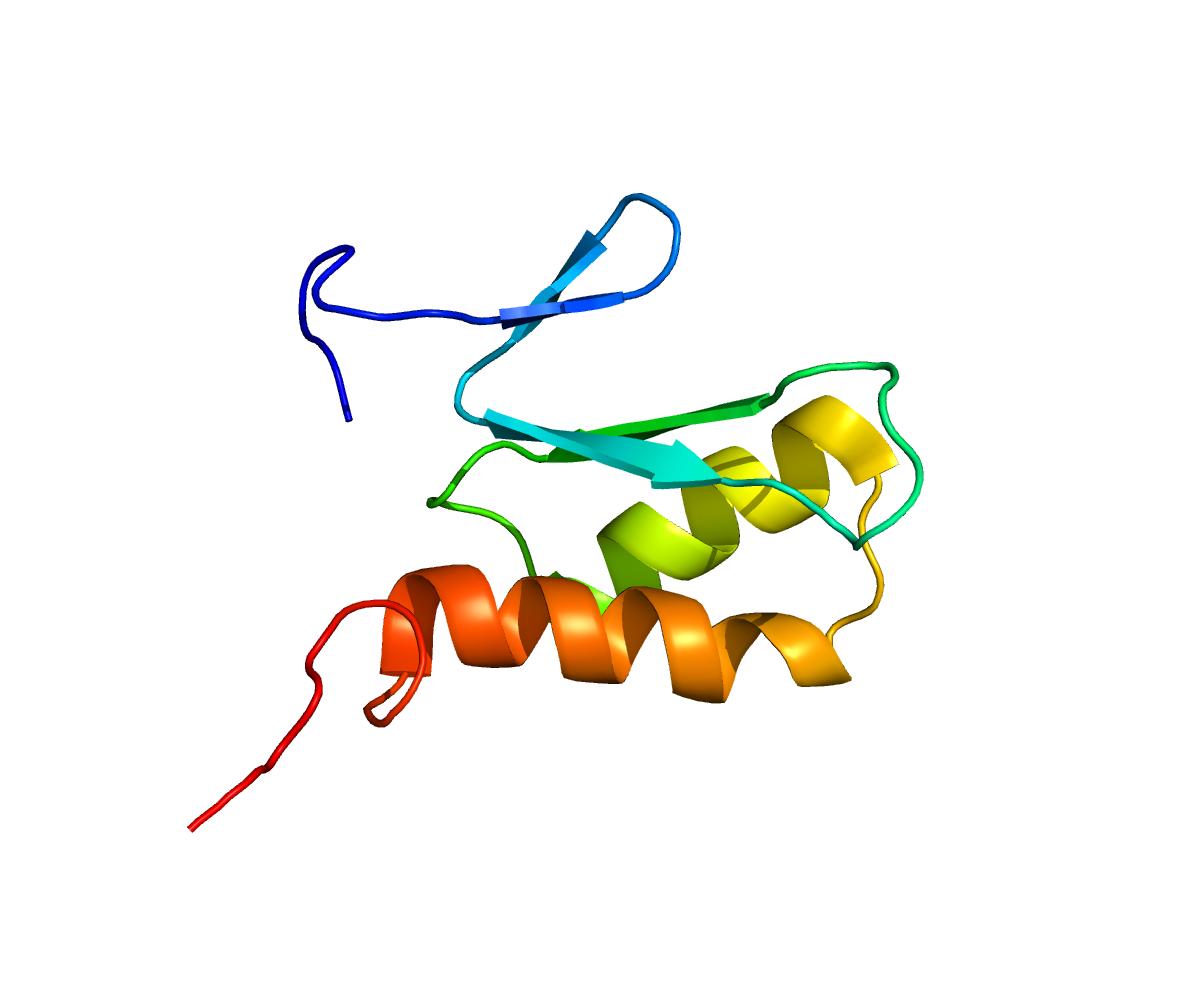

Identifiers
- Aliases: PLAA, DOA1, PLA2P, PLAP, phospholipase A2 activating protein, NDMSBA
- External IDs: OMIM: 603873; MGI: 104810; GeneCards: PLAA
Available structures
PDB	Ortholog search: PDBe RCSB
PDB	List of PDB id codes 2K89, 2K8A, 2K8B, 2K8C, 3EBB

Gene location (Human)
Chr.	Chromosome 9 (human)
Band	9p21.2	Start	26,903,372 bp
Band	9p21.2	End	26,947,242 bp

Gene location (Mouse)
Chr.	Chromosome 4 (mouse)
Band	4 C5|4 43.34 cM	Start	94,455,751 bp
Band	4 C5|4 43.34 cM	End	94,491,481 bp
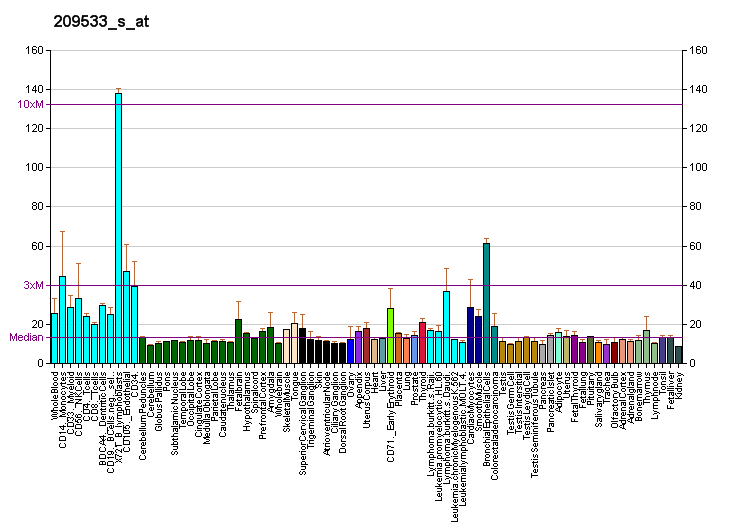

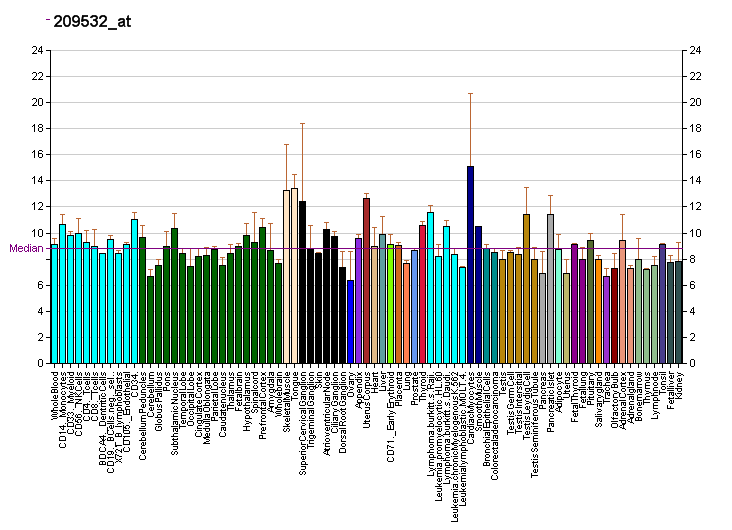
RNA expression pattern
Bgee	Human / Mouse (ortholog); Top expressed in: gastrocnemius muscle; secondary oocyte; stromal cell of endometrium; muscle of thigh; testicle; ganglionic eminence; monocyte; ventricular zone; gonad; Achilles tendon / Top expressed in: tail of embryo; genital tubercle; zygote; secondary oocyte; epiblast; medial ganglionic eminence; Gonadal ridge; mandibular prominence; primitive streak; somite; More reference expression data
BioGPS	More reference expression data
Gene ontology
Molecular function	protein binding; phospholipase A2 activator activity; ubiquitin binding
Cellular component	extracellular exosome; cytoplasm; nucleus; synapse; cell junction
Biological process	phospholipid metabolic process; inflammatory response; signal transduction; ubiquitin recycling; proteasome-mediated ubiquitin-dependent protein catabolic process; macroautophagy; ubiquitin-dependent protein catabolic process via the multivesicular body sorting pathway; cellular response to lipopolysaccharide; negative regulation of protein K63-linked ubiquitination; positive regulation of synaptic vesicle recycling; positive regulation of dendrite extension; positive regulation of neuron migration; prostaglandin metabolic process; multicellular organism development; nervous system development; positive regulation of phospholipase A2 activity
Sources:Amigo / QuickGO
Orthologs
Databases	NCBI: entry; OMA: entry
Species	Human	Mouse
Entrez	9373	18786
Ensembl	ENSG00000137055	ENSMUSG00000028577
UniProt	Q9Y263	P27612
RefSeq (mRNA)	NM_001031689; NM_004253; NM_001321546	NM_172695
RefSeq (protein)	NP_001026859; NP_001308475	NP_766283
Location (UCSC)	Chr 9: 26.9 – 26.95 Mb	Chr 4: 94.46 – 94.49 Mb
PubMed search
- Wikidata
View/Edit Human	View/Edit Mouse

Phospholipase A-2-activating protein is an enzyme that in humans is encoded by the PLAA gene.
