= Canadian Science Publishing =

Canadian journal publisher

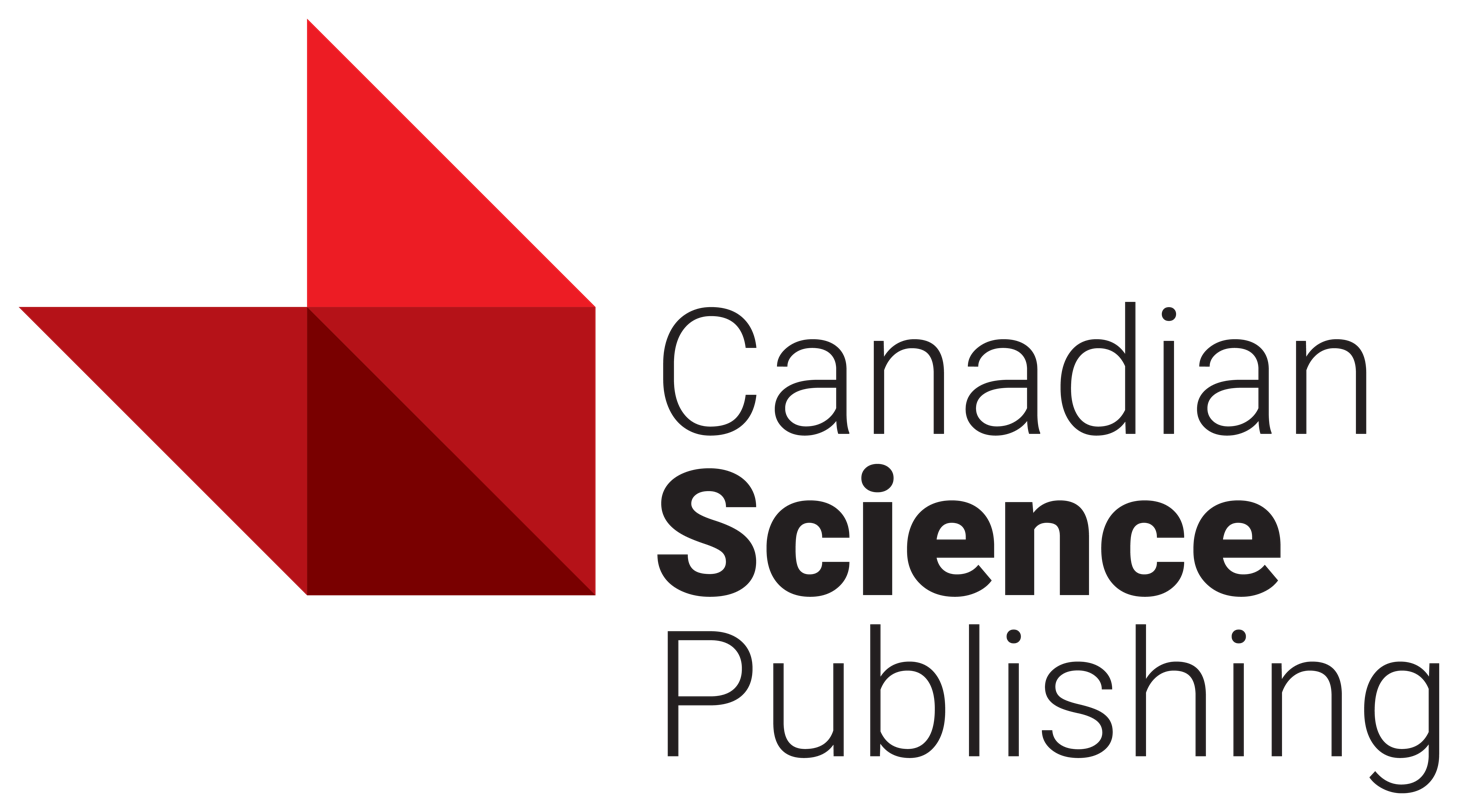
- Founded: 1929; 97 years ago
- Founder: National Research Council
- Country of origin: Canada
- Headquarters location: Ottawa, Ontario
- Publication types: academic journals
- Nonfiction topics: Science
- Official website: cdnsciencepub.com

Canadian Science Publishing (CSP) is Canada's largest publisher of international scientific journals. It started in 1929 as the NRC Research Press, part of the National Research Council (NRC). In 2010, the organization spun off from NRC and was incorporated as a not-for-profit.

As of 2025, CSP has published about 2,500 articles annually in 25 journals distributed to over 125 countries. CSP has 60 staff members, and, according to the website Owler, its annual revenue is about US$3.7M. All of CSP's journals are produced and delivered in both HTML and PDF formats, is connected to scientific literature, included in all major indexes, and archived through both CLOCKSS and Portico.

== Open access ==
CSP has an Open Access program, which permits authors and/or research funding agencies to sponsor online open access of their article. It also has auto-deposit of accepted manuscripts into the University of Toronto TSpace, a free and secure research repository; and an adoption of a Creative Commons CC BY.

CSP publishes five open access journals: Arctic Science, a journal that focuses on research about northern polar regions; FACETS, Canada’s first open access multidisciplinary science journal; "Journal of Psychiatry and Neuroscience"; "Contaminants, Environment and Society"; and Drone Systems and Applications.

CSP also provides the CSP blog, which includes plain language summaries of featured research. FACETS also publishes plain language summaries.

Canadian Science Publishing is a signatory of the SDG Publishers Compact, and has taken steps to support the achievement of the Sustainable Development Goals (SDGs) in the publishing industry. These include recognizing the lack of indigenous peoples in peer review and publishing processes. CSP has taken steps to encourage co-production of knowledge in its journal Arctic Science. Co-editor-in-chief Lisa Loseto acknowledges that new processes may be needed to support indigenous participation in science.

== Publications ==
CSP publishes the following journals:

- Applied Physiology, Nutrition, and Metabolism
- Arctic Science: publishes original peer-reviewed research from all areas of natural science and applied science and engineering related to northern Polar Regions.
- Biochemistry and Cell Biology
- Botany
- Canadian Geotechnical Journal
- Canadian Journal of Animal Science: contains research on animal agriculture and animal products, including breeding and genetics; cellular and molecular biology; growth and development; meat science; modelling animal systems; physiology and endocrinology; ruminant nutrition; non-ruminant nutrition; and welfare, behaviour, and management
- Canadian Journal of Chemistry
- Canadian Journal of Civil Engineering
- Canadian Journal of Earth Sciences
- Canadian Journal of Fisheries and Aquatic Sciences: publishes research on -omics, cells, organisms, populations, ecosystems, or processes that affect aquatic systems.
- Canadian Journal of Forest Research
- Canadian Journal of Microbiology
- Canadian Journal of Physics
- Canadian Journal of Physiology and Pharmacology
- Canadian Journal of Plant Science: contains research on plant science relevant to continental climate agriculture, including plant production and management, horticulture, and pest management
- Canadian Journal of Soil Science: contains research on soil science, including use, management, properties, and development of soils.
- Canadian Journal of Zoology
- Environmental Reviews: presents authoritative literature reviews on environmental science and associated environmental studies topics, with emphasis on the effects on and response of both natural and manmade ecosystems to anthropogenic stress.
- FACETS: Canada’s first multidisciplinary open access science journal
- Genome
- Drone Systems and Applications: focuses on the field of unmanned vehicle systems and their sensors.
- Transactions of the Canadian Society for Mechanical Engineering: features research articles and notes in mechanical engineering.
