= Canadian Society of Pharmacology and Therapeutics =

Nonprofit organization in Hamilton, Canada

The Canadian Society of Pharmacology and Therapeutics (CSPT; French: Société Canadienne de Pharmacologie et de Thérapeutique) is an academic association whose mission is the promotion of research and education in pharmacology and therapeutics in Canada. It comprises graduate students, postdoctoral fellows, established investigators and clinical scientists working in academia, clinical practice, government, and industry. Despite being based in Canada and having a majority of Canadian members, this is not a condition of membership, and the Society has members from all over the world. The CSPT is the Canadian member of the International Union of Basic and Clinical Pharmacology.

== Publications ==
- Canadian Journal of Clinical Pharmacology
- Canadian Journal of Physiology and Pharmacology
