= Canadian Journal of Plant Science =

- Discipline: Plant sciences
- Language: English, French
- Edited by: Youbin Zheng

Publication details
- History: 1957-present
- Publisher: Canadian Science Publishing (Canada)
- Frequency: Bimonthly
- Impact factor: 1.0 (2024)

Standard abbreviations
- ISO 4: Can. J. Plant Sci.

Indexing
- ISSN: 0008-4220 (print); 1918-1833 (web)
- OCLC no.: 1080293280

Links
- Journal homepage

The Canadian Journal of Plant Science (French: Revue canadienne de phytotechnie) is a Canadian peer-reviewed scientific journal which covers botanical research relevant to continental climate agriculture. It was established in 1957.
