= Canadian Journal of Soil Science =

- Discipline: Soil science
- Language: English, French
- Edited by: M. Anne Naeth, Ph.D.

Publication details
- History: 1957-Present
- Publisher: Canadian Science Publishing (Canada)
- Frequency: Quarterly
- Impact factor: 1.7 (2022)

Standard abbreviations
- ISO 4: Can. J. Soil Sci.

Indexing
- ISSN: 0008-4271 (print); 1918-1841 (web)
- OCLC no.: 1081151184

Links
- Journal homepage

The Canadian Journal of Soil Science (French: Revue canadienne de la science du sol) is a Canadian quarterly academic journal which publishes research on the nature and management of soils. It was established in 1957, and it is published both in print and online.
