= Canadian Journal of Physiology and Pharmacology =

- Discipline: Pharmacology, physiology, nutrition, toxicology
- Language: English, French
- Edited by: Dylan Burger and Kelly Hyndman

Publication details
- Former names: Canadian Journal of Biochemistry and Physiology
- History: 1964–present
- Publisher: Canadian Science Publishing (Canada)
- Frequency: Continuous

Standard abbreviations
- ISO 4: Can. J. Physiol. Pharmacol.

Indexing
- CODEN: CJPPA3
- ISSN: 0008-4212 (print); 1205-7541 (web)
- LCCN: 67033839
- OCLC no.: 01553154

Links
- Journal homepage; online access

The Canadian Journal of Physiology and Pharmacology (fr. Revue canadienne de physiologie et pharmacologie) is a peer-reviewed scientific journal that reports the most current research in the fields of physiology, nutrition, pharmacology, and toxicology. Content is contributed to the journal by recognized experts and scientists in the field. The journal is published by Canadian Science Publishing.

The journal was established in 1964 after the split of Canadian Journal of Biochemistry and Physiology into two parts, the other one being Canadian Journal of Biochemistry (now Biochemistry and Cell Biology). While the vast majority of its papers are in English, the journal also publishes in French. Papers are published "Just-in" (or ahead of print) upon acceptance in advance of the final version of the paper, which would be published in the volume issue. Papers are available in HTML and PDF formats.

The journal is affiliated with the Canadian Society of Pharmacology and Therapeutics, the Canadian Physiological Society, the International Academy of Cardiovascular Sciences, and the Society of Toxicology of Canada.

== Abstracting and indexing ==
The journal is abstracted and indexed in the following bibliographic databases:

- Chemical Abstracts
- Current Contents/Life Sciences
- EBSCO
- Global Health
- MEDLINE/PubMed
- Nutrition Abstracts and Reviews Series A: Human and Experimental
- Pharmacoeconomics and Outcomes News
- ReadCube
- Science Citation Index
- Scopus
- Summon by Serials Solutions
