= Lists of Canadians =

Canadians are people who are identified with Canada through residential, legal, historical, or cultural means. This list groups people by their area of notability.

== Architects ==
- Hans Blumenfeld OC (1892–1988) – architect and city planner
- Joan Burt (1930–2021) – architect
- Douglas Cardinal OC RAIC (born 1934) – architect of Canadian Museum of Civilization
- Mary Clark (born 1936) – architect and transportation planner
- Ernest Cormier OC RAIC (1885–1980) – architect of Supreme Court of Canada building
- A. J. Diamond OC RAIC (1934–2022) – architect of Four Seasons Centre for the Performing Arts
- Margaret Synge Dryer (1921–1963) – architect
- Arthur Erickson CC RAIC (1924–2008) – architect of Simon Fraser University, Robson Square, and the Embassy of Canada in Washington
- David Ewart ISO (1841–1921) – Chief Dominion Architect (1896 to 1914), architect of Dominion Archives Building, Royal Canadian Mint, Victoria Memorial Museum, Connaught Building in Ottawa
- Étienne Gaboury RAIC OAA (1930–2022) – architect of the Embassy of Canada in Mexico and the Royal Canadian Mint building in Winnipeg
- Frank Gehry CC LLD (hc) PhD (hc) DEng (hc) DArch (hc) DA (hc) AIA (1929–2025) – architect of Guggenheim Museum Bilbao, Experience Music Project, Walt Disney Concert Hall, and the Art Gallery of Ontario
- Dan Hanganu OQ DArch (hc) RAIC OAQ (1939–2017) – architect of Pointe-à-Callière Museum and Montreal Archival Centre
- Gregory Henriquez FRAIC OAA AIA (born 1963) RAIC – architect of the Woodward's Building, TELUS Garden, and redevelopment of Honest Ed's location
- Stephen Irwin RAIC RIBA OAA (1939–2019) – architect of Purdy's Wharf
- Bruce Kuwabara FRAIC OAA AIA (born 1949) RAIC – architect of the Gardiner Museum, and Kitchener City Hall
- E. J. Lennox RAIC OAA (1854–1933) – architect of Old City Hall in Toronto, and Casa Loma
- John M. Lyle FRIBA OAA (1872–1945) RAIC – architect of the New York Public Library, the Royal Alexandra Theatre, and Toronto's Union Station
- Raymond Moriyama CC OOnt (1929–2023) – architect of the Ontario Science Centre, Ottawa City Hall, and Canadian War Museum
- Samuel Oghale Oboh FAIA, FRAIC, Architect, AAA (born 1971) – 2015 president of the RAIC – architect of the International Law Enforcement Academy Botswana and the Botswana Police College; Lead Architect of the Alberta Legislature Centre Redevelopment Master Plan
- John Ostell (1813–1892) – architect of the McGill University Arts Building, and the Montreal Custom House
- Joseph Perrault (1866–1923) – architect of Centre d'histoire de Montréal
- Francis Rattenbury RAIC AIBC (1867–1935) – architect of the British Columbia Parliament Buildings, and the Empress Hotel
- Moshe Safdie CC LLD (hc) FRAIC FAIA (born 1938) – architect of Habitat 67, the National Gallery of Canada, and Vancouver Library Square
- Fariborz Sahba (born 1948) – master's degree from Faculty of Fine Arts at the University of Tehran, architect of Lotus Temple, and Terraces (Baháʼí)
- Henry Sears FRAIC (1929–2003) – Massey medal-winning architect, urban and gallery planner
- Brigitte Shim (born 1958) – Order of Canada for architecture, and Integral House
- Bing Thom CM FRAIC AIBC (1940–2016) – architect of Central City Centre
- Ronald Thom FRAIC AIBC (1923–1986) – architect of Massey College, the Shaw Theatre, and Trent University
- Douglas A. Webber (1901–1971) – architect of several buildings in Nova Scotia

== Artists ==
=== Animators ===
- Ryan Larkin (1943–2007) – nominated for an Academy Award for Best Short Film, Walking, 1969

=== Photographers ===
- Ivaan Kotulsky (1944–2008)
- Yousuf Karsh
- Fred Herzog

=== Visual arts ===
==== Cartoonists ====
- Michael de Adder (born 1967) – editorial cartoonist and caricaturist
- Danny Antonucci (born 1957) – creator of Ed Edd n Eddy
- Kate Beaton (born 1983) – creator of Hark! A Vagrant
- Chester Brown (born 1960) – creator of Yummy Fur, Underwater and Louis Riel
- John Byrne (born 1950) – influenced superhero characters like The Fantastic Four and Superman
- Andy Donato (born 1937) – editorial cartoonist for the Toronto Sun
- Hal Foster (1892–1982) – artist for Tarzan comic strip, creator of Prince Valiant
- J.D. Frazer (born 1965) (moniker: Illiad) – creator of the webcomic User Friendly
- Gregory Gallant (born 1962) (moniker: Seth) – creator of Palookaville
- Lynn Johnston CM OM (born 1947) – creator of For Better or For Worse
- John Kricfalusi (born 1955) (moniker: John K.) – creator of Ren and Stimpy
- Graeme MacKay (born 1968) – editorial cartoonist
- Sean Martin (1950–2020) – creator of the print and webcomic "Doc and Raider"
- Todd McFarlane (born 1961) – creator of Spawn
- Win Mortimer (1919–1998) – illustrator for DC Comics' Superman and Batman
- Terry Mosher OC DLitt (hc) (born 1942) (moniker: Aislin) – Montreal Gazette newspaper
- Len Norris (1919–1997) – long-time editorial columnist for the Vancouver Sun
- Ryan North (born 1980) – creator of the webcomic Dinosaur Comics
- Joe Shuster (1914–1992) – co-creator of Superman
- Dave Sim (born 1956) – creator of Cerebus the Aardvark
- Fiona Staples (born 1984) – co-creator of Saga
- Paul Szep (born 1941) – editorial cartoonist for the Boston Globe 1967–2001
- Ben Wicks CM (1926–2000) – illustrator, comic strip cartoonist, and humanitarian

== Astronauts ==
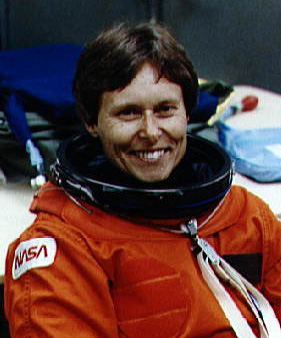
Roberta Bondar

- Roberta Bondar OC OOnt ScD (hc) FRCP(C) FRSC (born 1945) – first Canadian woman in space
- Marc Garneau CC CD ScD (hc) (1949–2025) – first Canadian man in space
- Chris Hadfield OOnt MSC LLD (hc) DEng (hc) (born 1959) – first Canadian to walk in space, first Canadian to command the International Space Station
- Jeremy Hansen (born 1976), flew around the Moon on the 2026 Artemis II mission, first non-American to fly above low Earth orbit and to the Moon's vicinity
- Steven MacLean ScD (hc) (born 1954)
- Julie Payette CQ FMC (born 1963)
- David Saint-Jacques (born 1970), B.Eng., Ph.D., M.D.
- Robert Thirsk (born 1953) – holds Canadian record for longest time spent in space (204 days)
- Bjarni Tryggvason ScD (hc) (1945–2022)

== Businesspeople and entrepreneurs ==
- Max Aitken, 1st Baron Beaverbrook, Baron Beaverbrook PC (1879–1964) – publishing baron, entrepreneur
- Francesco Aquilini (born 1969) – chairman of the Aquilini Investment Group and owner of the Vancouver Canucks
- David Asper (born 1958) – chairman, Canwest Global Communications
- Izzy Asper OC QC OM (1932–2003) – chairman, Canwest Global Communications
- Meghan Athavale – entrepreneur and visual artist
- Jeannine Bailliu – economist, policy advisor at the Bank of Canada
- Keenan Beavis (born 1995) – entrepreneur and investor, founder of Longhouse
- Conrad Black (born 1944) – Lord Black of Crossharbour KCSG LLD (hc) (born 1944) – entrepreneur, publisher
- Willard Boyle (1924–2011) – invented charge-coupled device
- Sophie Brochu (born 1963) – economist and businesswoman, president and CEO of Gaz Métro/Énergir and Hydro-Québec
- Edgar Bronfman, Sr. (1929–2013) – head of Seagram's and long-time president of the World Jewish Congress
- Samuel Bronfman CC (1889–1971) – founder of Seagram's
- Robert Campeau (1923–2017) – real-estate mogul
- Jack Kent Cooke (1912–1997) – owner of the Los Angeles Lakers, Los Angeles Kings, Washington Redskins and the Chrysler Building
- James Alexander Cowan (1901–1978) – public relations consultant and founder of Stratford Shakespeare Festival
- Samuel Cunard Bt (1787–1865) – founder of Cunard Line
- William Davidson (1740–1790) – lumberman, shipbuilder, merchant
- Christine M. Day (born 1962) – former CEO of the Canadian clothing company Lululemon Athletica
- Michael DeGroote OC (1932–2022) – businessman and philanthropist
- Paul Desmarais PC CC (1927–2013) – chairman, Power Corporation of Canada

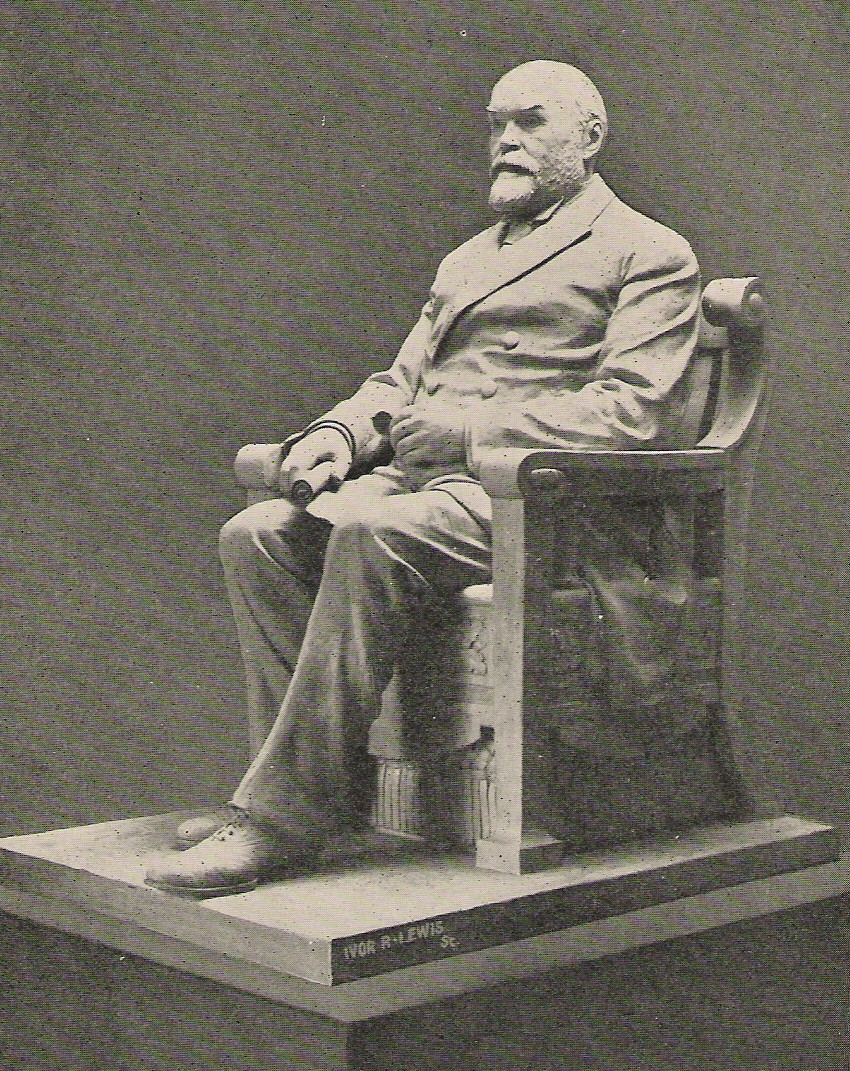
Timothy Eaton

- Craig Dobbin OC (1935–2006) – founder, chairman and CEO of CHC Helicopter Corporation
- Denzil Doyle (born 1932/1933) – founding president of Digital Equipment Corporation's Canadian subsidiary
- James Hamet Dunn Bt (1874–1956) – financier, steel magnate
- Timothy Eaton (1834–1907) – founder of Eaton's department stores
- Bernie Ebbers (1941–2020) – former CEO of WorldCom
- Sam Feldman OBC (born 1949) – music executive
- Alfred Fuller (1885–1973) – Fuller Brush Company
- Jayson Gaignard (born 1986) – founder of MasterMindTalks
- Arcadi Gaydamak (born 1952) – owner of Beitar Jerusalem
- Percy Girouard KSMG (1867–1932) – railway builder, governor
- Angèle Grenier – maple syrup producer known for her legal battles with the Federation of Quebec Maple Syrup Producers
- Elliot Grove, founder of Raindance Film Festival, British Independent Film Awards and the Independent Film Trust
- Charles Guillimin (1676–1739) – shipbuilder, merchant and moneylender
- Zabeen Hirji (born 1960) – speaker, writer, former Chief Human Resources Officer, Royal Bank of Canada
- Janet Holder – business executive, head of Enbridge Northern Gateway Pipelines
- K. C. Irving OC ONB (1899–1992) – industrialist
- Suresh Joachim (born 1968) – co-founder of WBBAS, No Poverty No Disease No War, World Peace Marathon, and Suresh Joachim International Group of Companies
- F. Ross Johnson (1931–2016) – former CEO of RJR Nabisco
- Ron Joyce CM (1930–2019) – original partner with Horton in Tim Hortons, primary builder of the chain
- Moez Kassam (born 1980) – hedge fund manager, founder of Anson Group
- Izaak Walton Killam (1885–1955) – major financier
- James L. Kraft (1874–1953) – entrepreneur and inventor, founder of L. Kraft & Bros. Company, which later became Kraft Foods Inc
- Richard L'Abbé OC (born 1956 or 1957) – co-founder and former CEO of Med-Eng Systems Inc, a company specializing in bomb disposal suits and helmets
- Guy Laliberté OC CQ (born 1959) – founder and owner of the Cirque du Soleil
- Bernard Lamarre (1931–2016) – chairman & C.E.O., Lavalin Group, 1972–1991; senior advisor, SNC-Lavalin Inc., 1991–2016
- Cindy Lee – founder of T & T Supermarket
- Michael Lee-Chin LLD (hc) (born 1951) – CEO of AIC Diversified Canada Split Corp. and the National Commercial Bank of Jamaica
- Li Ka-shing (born 1928) – chairman of the board of Cheung Kong Holdings and Hutchison Whampoa
- Victor Li (born 1964) – deputy chairman of Cheung Kong (Holdings) Limited
- William Secondo Lombardo (1930–2009) – owner of Lombardo Construction and CEO of Peerless-Cascade Plastics
- Pete Luckett (born 1953) – owner of Pete's Frootique and host of The Food Hunter
- William Christopher Macdonald (1831–1917) – tobacco manufacturer, education philanthropist
- Terry Matthews OC FREng (born 1943) – entrepreneur, chairman of Mitel and Wesley Clover
- Louis B. Mayer (1885–1957) – co-founder of Metro-Goldwyn-Mayer (MGM) Studios
- Harrison McCain CC ONB (1927–2004) – New Brunswick potato magnate
- Colonel Samuel McLaughlin CC CD ED (1871–1972) – Buick automobile manufacturer
- Simon McTavish (1750–1804) – fur trader
- Hartland Molson OC GOQ OBE (1907–2002) – senator, president of Molson Breweries
- John Molson (1763–1836) – founder of Molson Breweries
- Peter Munk OC (1927–2018) – founder of Barrick Gold
- Saadia Muzaffar – entrepreneur, author and founder of TechGirls Canada
- Stephan Ouaknine – businessman in telecommunications and renewable energy
- Jim Pattison CM OBC (born 1928) – chairman, president, CEO, and owner of the Jim Pattison Group
- Pierre Péladeau CM OQ (1925–1997) – founder of Quebecor Inc.
- Pierre Karl Péladeau (born 1961) – president, CEO of Quebecor Inc., Québecor Média Inc. and Sun Media Corporation
- Marie Penny (died 1970) – owner and operator of one of the largest 20th-century frozen fish companies in Newfoundland
- John Draper Perrin (1890–1967) – entrepreneur, financier, mining executive
- Richard Porritt OC (1901–1985) – mining industry executive
- Jean Pouliot (1923–2004) – founder of CFCF et Télévision Quatre Saisons
- John Redpath (1796–1869) – canal builder, sugar refinery founder
- Paul Reichmann (1930–2013) – developer of Canary Wharf
- Edward Samuel Rogers OC (1933–2008) – president and CEO of Rogers Communications
- John Roth (born 1942) – former CEO of Nortel Networks
- Lino Saputo (born 1937) – founder of Saputo
- Isadore Sharp OC (born 1931) – founder of the Four Seasons Hotel chain
- E. D. Smith (1858–1943) – founder of E. D. Smith & Sons Ltd
- Levy Solomons (1730–1792) – merchant and fur trader
- Paul Soubry (born 1963) – ceo of New Flyers
- John F. Stairs (1848–1904) – entrepreneur, statesman
- Frank Stronach CM (born 1932) – entrepreneur, founder of Magna International
- E. P. Taylor (1901–1989) – entrepreneur, thoroughbred horse breeder
- Nat Taylor (1906–2004) – originator of Cineplex Entertainment
- Kenneth Thomson, Baron Thomson of Fleet (1923–2006)
- Roy Thomson, Baron Thomson of Fleet GBE (1894–1976) – entrepreneur, publisher
- William Cornelius Van Horne KCMG (1843–1915) – constructed the Canadian Pacific Railway
- Jack L. Warner (1892–1978) – founder of Warner Bros. Studios
- Galen Weston OC OOnt (1940–2021) – owner of Loblaws, Holt Renfrew, and Selfridges
- Chip Wilson (born 1956) – founder of Lululemon Athletica
- Walter Wolf (born 1939) – oil drilling equipment supplier and Formula 1 team owner
- Bob Young (born 1953/1954) – self-publishing website, owner of CFL Hamilton Tiger Cats

== Criminals and suspects ==
- Marie-Joseph Angélique (1710–1734) – executed for setting the city of Montreal on fire
- Johnson Aziga (born 1956) – first person to be charged with first-degree murder in Canada for spreading HIV
- Paul Bernardo (born 1964) – serial killer, serial rapist
- Richard Blass (1945–1975) – multiple murderer
- Edwin Alonzo Boyd (1914–2002) – bank robber
- Alfonso Caruana (born 1946) – mobster
- Paul Joseph Cini (born 1944) – Canada's first skyjacker, sentenced to life imprisonment
- John Etter Clark (1915–1956) – provincial politician, teacher, farmer, mass murderer
- Robert Cook (1937–1960) – mass murderer
- Jacques Cossette-Trudel (1947–2023) – FLQ terrorist
- Louise Cossette-Trudel (born 1947) – FLQ terrorist
- Vincenzo Cotroni (1911–1984) – mobster
- Frank Cotroni (1931–2004) – mobster
- John Martin Crawford (1962–2020) – serial killer
- Matthew de Grood (born 1993) – mass murderer
- Raynald Desjardins (born 1953) – mobster
- Evelyn Dick (1920–?) – convicted of infanticide; convicted and acquitted of having murdered her husband
- Terry Driver (1965–2021) – murderer
- Valery Fabrikant (born 1940) – former university professor and mass murderer
- Larry Fisher (1949–2015) – convicted of the murder for which David Milgaard (see "Wrongfully convicted", below) was originally convicted and subsequently exonerated
- Charles Guité (born c. 1943) – fraud
- John Hamilton (1899–1934) – bank robber, killer
- Victor Hoffman (1946–2004) – mass murderer
- Karla Homolka (born 1970) – serial killer
- Bindy Johal (1971–1998) – Vancouver gangster
- Russell Maurice Johnson (born 1947) – serial killer and rapist
- David Michael Krueger (1939–2010) – serial killer and child rapist
- Jacques Lanctôt (born 1945) – FLQ terrorist
- Yves Langlois (born 1947) – FLQ terrorist
- Robert Latimer (born 1953) – convicted of second-degree murder
- Allan Legere (1948–2026) – serial killer
- Blake Leibel (born 1981) – murderer
- Marc Lépine (1964–1989) – mass murderer
- Denis Lortie (born 1959) – murderer
- Luka Rocco Magnotta (born 1982) – murderer
- Grace Marks (c. 1828–after c. 1873) – convicted of murder in 1843
- Bruce McArthur (born 1951) – serial killer
- Allan McLean (1855–1881) – son of Fort Kamloops Chief Trader and leader and eldest of the group known as the Wild McLean Boys, who went on a killing spree with his brothers and accomplice Alex Hare in the British Columbia Interior in 1876
- Paddy Mitchell (1942–2007) – bank robber, leader of The Stopwatch Gang
- Kenneth Murdock (born 1963) – hitman
- Dale Nelson (1939–1999) – cannibal and mass murderer
- Clifford Olson (1940–2011) – serial child murderer
- Johnny Papalia (1924–1997) – mobster
- Rocco Perri (1887–c. 1944) – gangster, bootlegger
- Robert Pickton (1949–2024) – serial murderer
- Monica Proietti (1940–1967) – bank robber
- Kenneth Ratte (born 1963) – career criminal
- Louis Riel (1844–1885) – executed for treason
- Lucien Rivard (c. 1915–2002) – narcotics smuggler
- Nicolo Rizzuto (1924–2010) – mobster
- Vito Rizzuto (1946–2013) – mobster
- Paul Rose (1943–2013) – FLQ terrorist
- Frank "Dunie" Ryan (1942–1984) – gangster
- Pietro Scarcella (born 1950) – mobster
- Jeffrey Shuman (born 1962) – bank robber
- Francis Simard (1946–2015) – FLQ terrorist
- Slumach (died 1891) – Katzie man convicted and hung for the murder of Louis Bee, a Kanaka (Hawaiian) half-breed
- Cathy Smith (1947–2020) – convicted of manslaughter in death of John Belushi
- Stanley James Tippett – kidnapper and rapist
- Colin Thatcher (born 1938) – murderer
- Mark Twitchell (born 1979) – murderer
- Paolo Violi (1931–1978) – mobster
- Paul Volpe (1927–1983) – mobster
- Elizabeth Wettlaufer (born 1967) – serial killer
- Russell Williams (born 1963) – former RCAF military pilot and wing commander; convicted murderer, rank and decorations revoked upon conviction
- Gabriel Wortman (1968–2020) – spree killer
- Thomas Young (1931–1959) – rapist and mass murderer
- Rocco Zito (1928–2016) – mobster

=== Wrongfully convicted or lynched ===
- Robert Baltovich (born 1965) – wrongfully convicted of murder
- Donald Marshall, Jr. (1953–2009) – wrongfully convicted of murder
- David Milgaard (1952–2022) – wrongfully convicted of murder
- Guy Paul Morin (born 1961) – wrongfully convicted of murder
- Louie Sam (c. 1870–1884) – wrongfully accused of murder and hanged by lynch mob in Whatcom County, Washington
- Steven Truscott (born 1945) – wrongfully convicted of murder

== Educators ==
- J. Willis Ambrose (1911–1974) – professor at the Queen's University at Kingston
- Sonia Aïssa – professor at the Institut national de la recherche scientifique
- Richard Lee Armstrong FRSC (1937–1991) – University of British Columbia professor, geochemist
- Annie Mottram Craig Batten (1883–1964) – professor in the Vocal Faculty of the College of Music, University of Southern California
- Martha Black (1945–2024) – art historian, curator and author
- Marguerite Bourgeoys (1620–1700) – founder of the Congregation of Notre Dame of Montreal
- Stephen E. Calvert FRSC (born 1935) – University of British Columbia emeritus professor, geologist, oceanographer
- Petr Cerny (1934–2018) ScD (hc) FRSC – University of Manitoba professor, mineralogist and crystallographer
- Aleksis Dreimanis (1914–2011) – University of Western Ontario emeritus professor, quaternary geologist
- George Georgiou (living) – university professor
- James E. Gill (1901–1980) – McGill University professor, geologist
- Henry C. Gunning ScD (hc) FRSC (1901–1991) – University of British Columbia professor, geologist
- James Edwin Hawley (1897–1965) – professor at Queen's, geologist (Hawleyite)
- Frank Hawthorne OC FRSC (born 1946) – University of Manitoba professor, mineralogist and crystallographer
- Adelaide Hoodless (1858–1910) – education and women's activist
- Michael Ignatieff (born 1947) – University of Toronto, Harvard University, University of Oxford and University of Cambridge professor, political science
- Sue Johanson CM (1930–2023) – sex educator
- Michael John Keen (1935–1991) – Dalhousie University professor, marine geoscientist
- Sean Kelly (1940–2022) – Pratt Institute, NYC, Humanities & Media Studies, writer
- J. Ross Mackay OC FRSC (1915–2014) – University of British Columbia professor, geologist
- Eric W. Mountjoy FRSC (1931–2010) – McGill University professor, geologist
- Gerard V. Middleton FRSC (1931–2021) – McMaster University professor, geologist
- Anthony J. Naldrett FRSC (1933–2020) – University of Toronto emeritus professor, geologist
- Santa J. Ono FCAHS (born c. 1962) – University of British Columbia 15th president & vice-chancellor, professor, medical scientist
- William Richard Peltier ScD (hc) FRSC (born c. 1942) – University of Toronto professor, physicist
- Jordan Peterson (born 1962) – Canadian clinical psychologist and professor of psychology at the University of Toronto
- Paula Rochon – chair in Geriatric Medicine at the University of Toronto in 2022
- Egerton Ryerson (1803–1882) – public education advocate
- Gad Saad (born 1964) - Lebanese-born Jewish Canadian evolutionary behavioral scientist
- Dora Sakayan (born 1931) – full professor, Department of German Studies, McGill University; Armenology, Contrastive Linguistics, Language Acquisition, Translation, Genocide Studies
- Colin Simpson (born c. 1965) – George Brown College, best-selling author
- Charles R. Stelck OC ScD (hc) FRSC (1917–2016) – University of Alberta professor, petroleum geologist, paleontologist, stratigrapher
- David Strangway OC ScD (hc) FRSC (1934–2016) – geophysicist and university administrator
- Thomas Symons CC OOnt (1929–2021) – founding president of Trent University, professor of Canadian Studies
- Claude Vivier (1948–1983) – organ pedagogue and professor at Collège Montmorency
- Roger G. Walker FRSC – McMaster University emeritus professor
- William Winegard PC OC (1924–2019) – educator, engineer, scientist and former member of Parliament

== Environmentalists ==
See Canadian environmentalists.

== Fashion ==
- Jeanne Beker (born 1952) – reporter
- Sahar Biniaz (born November 17, 1985) – model
- Dean and Dan Caten (born 1965) – designers known as Dsquared
- Keshia Chanté (born 1988) – model and singer
- Steven Cojocaru (born 1970) (known as Cojo) – critic and correspondent on Entertainment Tonight
- Taryn Davidson (born 1991) – model
- Linda Evangelista (born 1965) – model
- Shalom Harlow (born 1973) – model and actress
- Winnie Harlow (born 1994) – model
- Irina Lazareanu (born 1982) – model
- Jay Manuel (born 1972) – expert on America's Next Top Model and Canada's Next Top Model
- Heather Marks (born 1988) – model
- Kenneth G. Mills (1923–2004) – designer
- Peter Nygard (born 1941) – designer
- Lana Ogilvie (born 1968) – model
- Coco Rocha (born 1988) – model
- Monika Schnarre (born 1971) – model
- Jessica Stam (born 1986) – model
- Daria Werbowy (born 1983) – Polish-born Canadian model
- Jason Wu (born 1982) – fashion designer, dolls artist

== Humanitarians ==
- Louise Arbour (born 1947) – former UN High Commissioner for Human Rights, former justice of the Supreme Court of Canada, former Chief Prosecutor of the International Criminal Tribunals for the former Yugoslavia and Rwanda
- J. Esmonde Barry (1923–2007) – healthcare activist and political commentator in New Brunswick
- Norman Bethune (1890–1939) – physician and medical innovator
- Richard Maurice Bucke FRSC (1837–1902) – psychiatrist, philosopher, early author on human development and human potentials
- Steve Fonyo OC Rescinded 2010 (born 1966) – retraced and completed Terry Fox's cross country cancer research fundraising marathon
- Terry Fox CC OD (1958–1981) – attempted one-legged cross country run for cancer research
- Marc Kielburger (born 1977) – author, social entrepreneur, columnist, humanitarian and activist for children's rights; co-founder, with his brother Craig, of the We Movement
- Grey Owl (1888–1938) (real name Archibald Stanfield Belaney) – conservationist who falsely presented himself as an Aboriginal person and worked to save the beavers of Saskatchewan and Manitoba
- Rick Hansen CC OBC LLD (hc) DLitt (hc) (born 1957) – paraplegic athlete who completed an around-the-world marathon for spinal cord injury research
- Stephen Lewis CC (1937–2026) – AIDS activist, United Nations special envoy for HIV/AIDS in Africa
- Harold A. Rogers OC OBE (1899–1994) – founder of Kin Canada
- Jean Vanier CC GOQ (1928–2019) – activist for the mentally disabled, founder of L'Arche

== Inventors ==
- Scott Abbott – co-inventor of Trivial Pursuit
- Thomas Ahearn PC (1855–1938) – invented the electric cooking range and the electric car heater
- Anthony R. Barringer (1925–2009) – holds 70 patents for mineral exploration technology
- Earl W. Bascom (1906–1995) – co-invented rodeo's side-delivery chute, invented reverse-opening side-delivery chute, hornless bronc saddle, one-hand bareback rigging and high-cut chaps
- Alexander Graham Bell (1847–1922) – born in Scotland, invented the telephone in Canada and developed it in the United States
- Joseph-Armand Bombardier (1907–1964) – invented the snowmobile
- Gerald Bull (1928–1990) – invented the G5 howitzer and the Iraqi supergun
- Herbert Henry Dow (1866–1930) – invented a method of bromine extraction known as the Dow process
- Mathew Evans – co-inventor of the first electric light bulb
- Charles Fenerty (c. 1821–1892) – inventor of the wood pulp process for making paper
- Reginald Fessenden (1866–1932) – radio inventor who made the first radio-transmitted audio transmission and the first two-way transatlantic radio transmission; also invented sonar and patented the first television system
- Sir Sandford Fleming KCMG DSc (hc) FRSC (1827–1915) – inventor of the system of Standard Time zones
- Wilbur R. Franks OBE (1901–1986) – invented the anti-black-out-suit (the G-suit)
- Abraham Pineo Gesner (1797–1864) – inventor of kerosene; known as the "father of the petroleum industry"
- James Gosling OC (born 1955) – invented Java computer language
- Chris Haney (1950–2010) – co-inventor of Trivial Pursuit
- Sam Jacks (1915–1975) – inventor of ringette
- George Klein OC MBE LLD (hc) (1904–1992) – developed: electric wheelchairs, microsurgical staple gun, the ZEEP nuclear reactor, and the Canadarm
- James L Kraft (1874–1953) – entrepreneur and inventor, founder of L. Kraft & Bros. Company, which later became Kraft Foods Inc; patented processed cheese (AKA American cheese)
- Thomas Edvard Krogh ScD (hc) FRSC (1936–2008) – developed technique of radiometric uranium-lead dating to further the precision of geochronology
- Hugh Le Caine (1914–1977) – invented the music synthesizer in 1945
- Cluny MacPherson (1879–1966) – invented the first general-issue gas mask used by the British Army in World War I
- Wilson Markle (1938–2020) – invented film colorization process in 1983
- Elijah McCoy (1844–1929) – developed automatic machinery lubricator, lawn sprinkler, the "Real McCoy"
- James Naismith (1861–1939) – invented basketball
- P. L. Robertson (1879–1951) – invented the Robertson screw
- Henry Ruttan (1792–1871) – invented air-conditioned railway coach
- Thomas F. Ryan (1872–1971) – invented five-pin bowling
- Arthur Sicard (1876–1946) – invented the snowblower in 1925
- Lewis Urry (1927–2004) – invented the long-lasting alkaline battery
- Harry Wasylyk (1925–2013) – invented the disposable green polyethylene garbage bag in 1950
- Thomas Willson (1860–1915) – invented arc lamps and process for creating calcium carbide
- Henry Woodward – co-inventor of the first electric light bulb

== Law ==
- J. S. Ewart (1849–1933) – lawyer, advocate for Canadian independence
- Frances Fish (1888–1975) – first woman to be called to the bar of Nova Scotia
- Mabel French (1881–1955) – first woman to practice law in two separate Canadian provinces: New Brunswick and British Columbia
- Catherine Latimer – lawyer and criminologist
- Alfred Scow (1927–2013) – First Nations judge

== Media ==
- Samantha Bee (born 1969) – host of Full Frontal with Samantha Bee
- Stephen Brunt (born 1959) – lead sports columnist for The Globe and Mail since 1989
- Stevie Cameron (1943–2024) – journalist, author
- Richard Gizbert (born 1960) – cable network journalist of Al Jazeera English
- Gordon Donaldson (1926–2001) – amateur historian, journalist
- Barbara Frum OC LLD (hc) (1937–1992) – CBC radio and television journalist
- Jian Ghomeshi (born 1967) – former musician and radio broadcaster
- Ken Hechtman (born 1967) – maverick journalist jailed by Afghanistan's Taliban government as a suspected United States spy in 2001
- Kenny Hotz (born 1967) – only registered Canadian journalist to cover the Gulf War
- Mark Irwin CSC/ASC (born 1950) – Hollywood Director of Photography
- Peter Jennings CM (1938–2005) – ABC news anchor
- Jason Jones (born 1967) – senior correspondent for The Daily Show
- Winnifred Jong – filmmaker
- Pat Kiernan (born 1968) – morning anchor of NY1 since 1997
- Michael Kesterton (1946–2018) – The Globe and Mail columnist
- Lisa LaFlamme (born 1964) – journalist, occasional chief anchor, and senior editor for CTV National News
- L. Ian MacDonald (born 1947) – author, columnist, broadcaster, and diplomat
- Neil Macdonald (born 1957) – CBC reporter
- Robert MacNeil (1931–2024) – journalist, author, longtime co-anchor of The MacNeil/Lehrer Report on PBS
- Peter Mansbridge OC LLD (hc) (born 1948) – news anchor of CBC's The National
- Rick Mercer OC (born 1969) – comedian, TV personality, political satirist and author
- Mosha Michael (c. 1948–2009) – Canada's first Inuk filmmaker
- Cory Morgan (born 1971) – blogger, Alberta independence politician and activist, and columnist
- Margaret Lally "Ma" Murray (1888–1982) – editor and co-publisher of the Bridge River-Lillooet News
- Peter C. Newman CC CD LLD (hc) (1929–2023) – eminent journalist and writer
- Sydney Newman OC (1917–1997) – supervisor of drama at the CBC, head of drama at the BBC, creator of the Doctor Who television series, chairman of the NFB
- David Oancia (1929–1995) – journalist
- Steve Paikin (born 1960) – journalist, film producer and author, best known for hosting TVOntario's Studio 2
- Pete Parker (1895–1991) – made the first ever broadcast of a professional hockey game
- Sandie Rinaldo (born 1950) – journalist and occasional news anchor for CTV National News
- John Roberts (born 1956) – Fox News Channel reporter, previously a CNN reporter and host of The New Music on MuchMusic
- Lloyd Robertson OC LLD (hc) (born 1934) – senior editor and former longtime anchor for CTV National News
- Morley Safer (1931–2016) – investigative journalist for CBS News and 60 Minutes
- Linus Sebastian (born 1986) – owner and founder of Linus Media Group
- Shane Smith (born 1969) – founder of Vice
- George Stroumboulopoulos (born 1972) – television journalist
- Scott Taylor (born 1960) – publisher, Esprit de Corps magazine
- Peter Trueman OC (1934–2021) – original newsman on Global TV
- Robyn Urback (born 1988) – journalist and political commentator
- Jan Wong (born 1952) – journalist

== Medical ==
- Evan Adams (born 1966) – First Nations medical doctor, medical advisor, Deputy Provincial Health Advisor (BC), and actor
- Maria Louisa Angwin (1849–1898) – first woman licensed to practice medicine in Nova Scotia
- Elizabeth Bagshaw CM (1881–1982) – physician and birth control activist
- Frederick Banting KBE MC LLD (hc) ScD (hc) FRSC (1891–1941) – Nobel laureate, co-discoverer of insulin
- John Cameron Bell (born 1953) – pioneer of oncolytic virus therapies for cancer
- Norman Bethune (1890–1939) – surgeon, inventor, socialist, battlefield doctor in Spain and China
- Wilfred Bigelow OC LLD (hc) FRSC (1913–2005) – inventor of the first artificial pacemaker
- Yvette Bonny (born 1938) – pediatrician
- Basil Boulton (1938–2008) – pediatrician and child health advocate
- Anna L. Brown (died 1924) – leading authority on health for girls
- John Callaghan OC AOE (1923–2004) – pioneer of open-heart surgery
- John Dick FRSC (born 1954) – credited with discovery of cancer stem cell
- Tommy Douglas PC CC SOM LLD (hc) (1904–1986) – introduced publicly funded health care in Canada; commonly known as the "father of Medicare"
- Carl Goresky OC (1932–1996) – physician and scientist
- David H. Hubel (1926–2013) – Nobel Prize winner in medicine for mapping the visual cortex
- Harold E. Johns OC (1915–1998) – medical physicist, noted for his extensive contributions to the use of ionizing radiation to treat cancer
- Doreen Kimura (1933–2013) – behavioural psychologist, world expert on sex differences in the brain
- William Harding le Riche (1916–2010) – epidemiologist
- Jeanne Mance (1606–1673) – established the first hospital in North America – the Hôtel-Dieu de Montréal – in 1644
- Ernest McCulloch CM OOnt FRSC FRS (1926–2011) – cellular biologist credited with the discovery of stem cell with James Till
- Frances Gertrude McGill (1882–1959) – pioneering forensic pathologist and criminologist
- Henry Morgentaler CM LLD (hc) (1923–2013) – abortion care provider who helped legalize abortion in Canada and strengthen the power of jury nullification
- William Osler Bt (1849–1919) – physician, called the "father of modern medicine"; wrote Principles and Practice of Medicine
- Daniel David Palmer (1845–1913) – founded the chiropractic profession
- Edgar Randolph Parker (1871–1951) (known as "Painless" Parker) – flamboyant dentist
- Wilder Penfield OM CC CMG FRS (1891–1976) – neurosurgeon, discovered electrical stimulation of the brain
- Jack Pickup (1919–1996) – general practitioner and surgeon, also known as the "Flying Doctor of British Columbia"
- Octavia Ritchie (1868–1948) – physician, suffragist and the first woman to receive a medical degree in Québec
- David Sackett CC FRSC (1934–2015) – founded the first department of clinical epidemiology in Canada at McMaster University
- Mary Elizabeth MacCallum Scott (1865–1941) – physician and missionary in Ceylon
- Sydney Segal CM OBC (1920–1997) – pediatrician and neonatologist particularly known for his work with sudden infant death syndrome
- James Till OC OOnt FRSC FRS (1931–2025) – biophysicist, credited for the discovery of stem cell with Ernest McCulloch
- A. Ross Tilley (1904–1988) MD FRCS(C) OBE OC – plastic surgeon
- Irene Ayako Uchida OC (1917–2013) – cytogenticist, Down syndrome researcher
- Amelia Yeomans (1842–1913) – physician and suffragist, first female physician in Manitoba

== Military figures ==
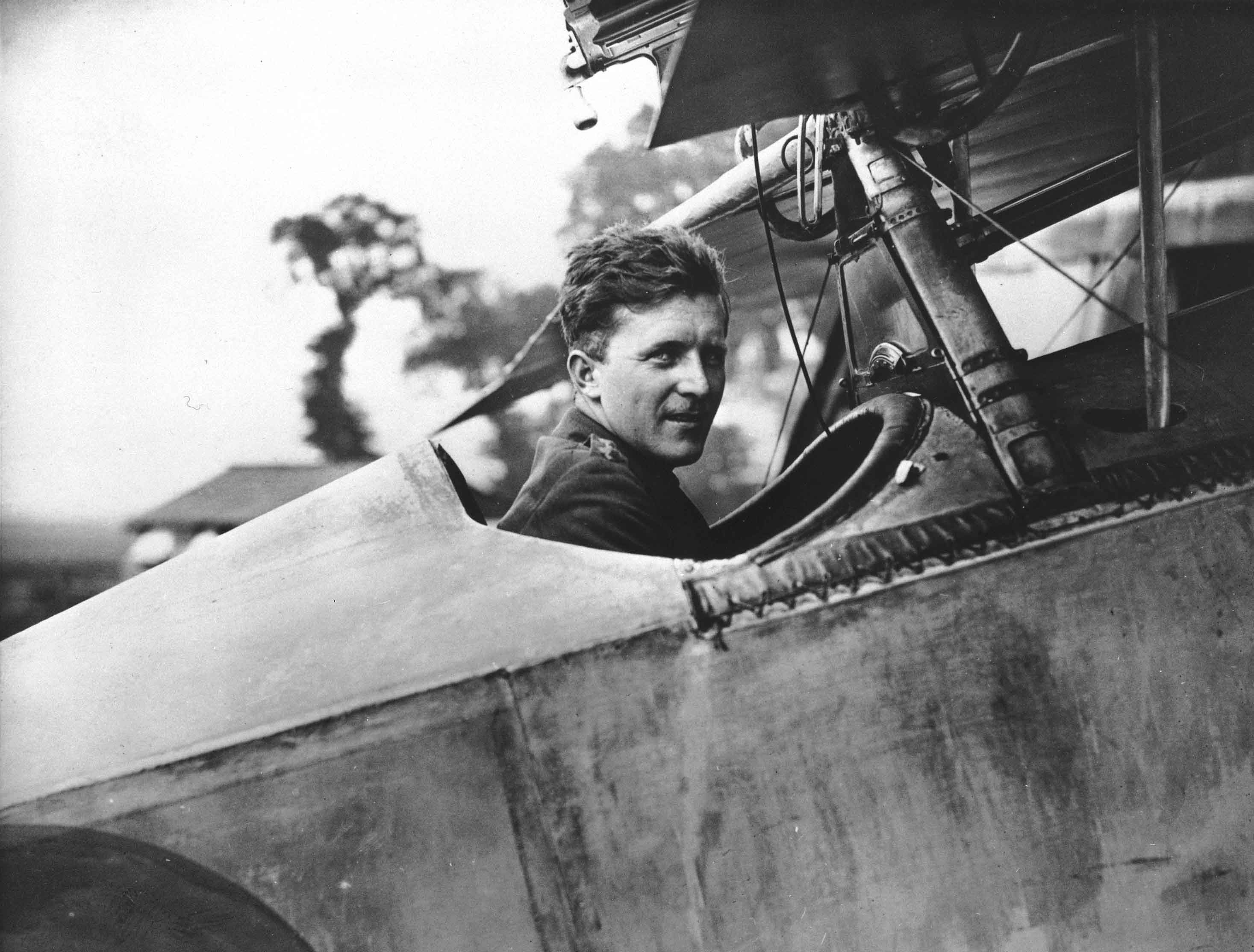
Billy Bishop

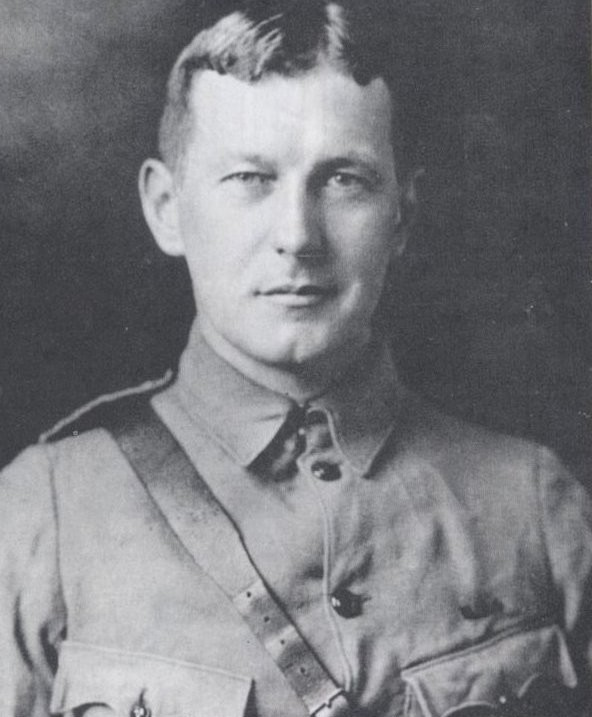
John McCrae

- General Maurice Baril OMM CD (born 1943) – military advisor to the United Nations Secretary-General, head of the Military Division of the Department of Peacekeeping Operations of the United Nations, and Chief of the Defence Staff
- Gustave Biéler DSO MBE (1904–1944) – Special Operations Executive agent, executed by the Nazis
- Louis-Nicolas-Emmanuel de Bigault d'Aubreville – head of the nightwatch in Montreal
- Air Commodore Leonard Birchall CM OBE DFC OOnt CD DMSc (hc) LLD (hc) (1915–2004) – war hero
- Air Marshall Billy Bishop VC CB DSO* MC DFC ED (1894–1956) (commonly known as Billy Bishop) –World War I flying ace
- Brigadier-General Jean Boyle CMM CD (born 1947) – fighter pilot, and businessman
- Major General Sir Isaac Brock KB (1769–1812) – War of 1812 general
- Captain Roy Brown DSC* RNAS (1893–1944) – World War I fighter pilot officially credited with shooting down the Red Baron
- Colonel Lawrence Moore Cosgrave DSO* (1890–1971) – Canadian signatory to the Japanese Instrument of Surrender
- General Harry Crerar CH CB DSO CD PC (1888–1965) – "leading field commander" in World War II
- Lieutenant-General Sir Arthur Currie KCB GCMG (1875–1933) – first Canadian commander of the Canadian Expeditionary Force
- Lieutenant-General Roméo Dallaire OC CMM GOQ MSC CD LLD (hc) ScDHum (hc) DHL (hc) (born 1946) – UN peacekeeping General, attempted to prevent the Rwandan genocide
- Guy D'Artois DSO GM (1917–1999) – SOE agent, recipient of the Croix de Guerre
- General John de Chastelain CH OC CMM CD LLD (hc) ScDMil (hc) FLMH (born 1937) – head of the Independent International Commission on Decommissioning
- Punch_Dickins OBE OC DFC ace (1899–1995) – Clennell Haggerston "Punch" Dickins, a pioneering Canadian aviator and bush pilot who was involved with flying of combat aircraft during World Wars 1 and 2
- Peter Dmytruk (1920–1943) – WWII flight sergeant and member of the French Resistance
- Brigadier-General Dury, Charles PC OC QC CBE DSO (1912–1991) – soldier, businessman, and politician
- John Weir Foote VC CD (1904–1988) – military chaplain, Ontario cabinet minister, and recipient of the Victoria Cross
- Captain Nichola Goddard MSM (1980–2006) – first female Canadian soldier killed in combat
- William Hall VC (1827–1904) – first Nova Scotian recipient of the Victoria Cross
- John Kenneth Macalister (1914–1944) – SOE agent, executed by the Nazis
- Vice-Admiral Bruce MacLean CMM, CD – chief of the Maritime Staff 2004–2006
- Captain Simon Mailloux (born 1983) – first Canadian soldier with an amputation to deploy on a combat mission; recipient of the Sacrifice Medal
- Lieutenant Colonel John McCrae (1872–1918) – soldier, poet, author of In Flanders' Fields
- Alan Arnett McLeod VC (1899–1918) – fighter pilot, youngest Canadian-born winner of the Victoria Cross
- General Andrew McNaughton CH CB CMG DSO CD PC (1887–1966) – Co-Minister of Defence during World War II
- Lieutenant Colonel Theodore Meighen (1905–1979) – lawyer and philanthropist
- Lieutenant Colonel Charles Merritt VC (1908–2000) – recipient of the Victoria Cross
- Major General Sydney Chilton Mewburn PC (1863–1956) – lawyer and politician, Minister of Militia and Defence
- Minnie "Jerri" Mumford (1909–2002) – serving member of the Canadian Women's Army Corps (CWAC) during World War II
- Rear Admiral Leonard W. Murray (1896–1971) – commander-in-chief of the Canadian Northwest Atlantic during World War II
- Henry Norwest MM & Bar (1884–1918) – sniper in World War I
- Lieutenant-Colonel George Pearkes VC PC CC CB DSO MC CD (1888–1984) – recipient of the Victoria Cross, Lieutenant Governor of British Columbia
- Francis Pegahmagabow MM** (1891–1952) – the most highly decorated aboriginal Canadian soldier of World War I
- Frank Pickersgill (1915–1944) – SOE agent, executed by the Nazis
- Rear Admiral Desmond Piers CM DSC CD ScDMil (hc) (1913–2005) – war hero
- George Lawrence Price (1898–1918) – last soldier killed in World War I
- Tommy Prince MM (1915–1977) – one of Canada's most decorated soldiers, member of the Devil's Brigade
- James Ralston PC (1881–1948) – Co-Minister of Defence during World War II
- Thomas Ricketts VC (1901–1967) – recipient of the Victoria Cross (Newfoundlander at the time of his award)
- Harold A. Rogers OC OBE (1889–1994) – founder of Kin Canada
- Roméo Sabourin (1923–1944) – SOE agent, executed by the Nazis
- General Guy Simonds CC CB CBE DSO CD (1903–1974) – commander of the II Canadian Corps
- Ernest Smith (1914–2005) – VC, CM, OBC, CD, Seaforth Highlander Private/ Sergeant, the last living Canadian recipient of the Victoria Cross, awarded for gallantry in actions at the River Savio, Northern Italy 1944
- Sam Steele CB KCMG MVO (1851–1919) – member of the North-West Mounted Police, commander of Yukon detachment
- William Stephenson CC MC DFC (1897–1989) (codename: Intrepid) – senior representative of British intelligence for the Western Hemisphere in World War II
- Lieutenant-General Kenneth Stuart CB DSO MC (1891–1945) – Chief of the General Staff 1941–1943, educator
- Tecumseh (1768–1813) – Leader of First Nations British Allies, War of 1812, died defeating American invasion
- Rear Admiral Robert Timbrell CMM DSC CD (1920–2006) – first Canadian to be decorated with the Distinguished Service Cross
- General Christopher Vokes CB CBE DSO CD (1904–1985) – General Officer commanding the Canadian Army Occupation Force in Europe
- Brigadier Sir Edward Oliver Wheeler (1890–1962) – Corps of Royal Engineers surveyor
- General Ramsey Muir Withers CMM CD LLD (hc) (1930–2014) – Chief of the Defense Staff
- Sir James Lucas Yeo (1782–1818) – commander of Royal Navy forces in Canada during the War of 1812

== Monarchs and Canadian royal family ==
Main articles:

- List of Canadian monarchs
- Canadian Royal Family

== Magicians ==
- Shawn Farquhar (born 1962) – magician, winner of the Grand Prix Close Up at the 2009 FISM World Championship of Magic
- Doug Henning (1947–2000) – credited with reviving the magic show in North America
- Leon Mandrake (1911–1993) – Mandrake the Great; and his sons Lon and Ron, born in 1948 and 1949, respectively
- James Randi (1928–2020) – magician, writer, skeptical investigator of paranormal and pseudo-scientific claims, founder of the James Randi Educational Foundation
- Dai Vernon (1894–1992) – magician, known as "the man who fooled Houdini"

== Politicians ==
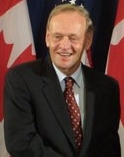
Jean Chrétien

- Adrien Arcand (1899–1967) – founder of the National Unity Party of Canada
- Lloyd Axworthy PC OC OM (born 1939) – former Cabinet minister
- Thomas Bain (1834–1915) – former speaker of the Canadian House of Commons
- Robert Baldwin (1804–1858) – former Joint Premier for Canada West, former MP for Hastings and Rimouski
- Maude Barlow LLD (hc) DHL (hc) (born 1947) – activist, chairperson of the Council of Canadians
- Perrin Beatty PC (born 1950) – former cabinet minister, president of CBC
- Monique Bégin PC OC ScD (hc) FRSC (1936–2023) – former cabinet minister
- Thomas R. Berger OC OBC (1933–2021) – jurist
- Ethel Blondin-Andrew PC (born 1951) – former Cabinet minister
- Henri Bourassa (1868–1952) – Quebec politician
- Pierre Bourgault (1934–2003) – president of Rassemblement pour l'indépendance nationale
- Ed Broadbent PC CC (1936–2024) – former New Democratic Party leader
- George Brown (1818–1880) – founder of the town Bothwell, one of the Fathers of Confederation
- Rosemary Brown PC CC OBC LLD (hc) (1930–2003) – former member of the British Columbia Legislative Assembly
- Tim Buck (1891–1973) – leader of the Canadian Communist Party
- George-Étienne Cartier Bt KSMG PC (1814–1873) – Cabinet minister
- Brock Chisholm CC MC* LLD (hc) (1896–1971) – first director-general of the World Health Organization
- Joe Clark (born 1939) – 16th prime minister of Canada, leader of the Progressive Conservative Party of Canada 1976–1983, and again 1998–2003
- Sheila Copps PC (born 1952) – sixth deputy prime minister of Canada
- Victor Copps (1919–1988) – former mayor of Hamilton
- John Lambton, 1st Earl of Durham, Earl of Durham GCB PC (1792–1840)
- Ellen Fairclough PC CC OOnt (1905–2004) – first female member of the Canadian Cabinet
- The Famous Five – 1920s women's rights activists
- Janice Filmon (born 1943) – lieutenant governor of Manitoba since 2015
- Iqwinder Singh Gaheer (born 1993) – member of Parliament for the riding of Mississauga—Malton
- Jennifer Granholm (born 1959) – first female governor of Michigan
- Gurmant Grewal (born 1957) – the "Ironman of Canadian Parliament"
- Nina Grewal (born 1958) – first South Asian and Sikh woman elected to Parliament; with her husband Gurmant, the Grewals are the first married couple to concurrently serve in Canadian Parliament
- Elijah Harper (1949–2013) – Cree chief (Red Sucker Lake Nation), MLA Manitoba, successfully blocked the Meech Lake Accord (proposed Constitutional amendment)
- C. D. Howe PC (1886–1960) – Cabinet minister
- Joseph Howe PC (1804–1873) – "father of Confederation"
- Michael Kerzner – Solicitor General of Ontario
- Stan Keyes PC (born 1953) – former MP of Hamilton West
- Louis-Hippolyte Lafontaine Bt (1807–1864) – co-premier of the United Province of Canada
- Franklin K. Lane (1864–1921) – 1910s United States Secretary of the Interior (1913–1920)
- Jack Layton PC (1950–2011) – leader of the New Democratic Party
- William Lyon Mackenzie (1795–1861) – mayor of Toronto
- Allan MacNab Bt (1798–1862) – prime minister of Upper Canada
- Agnes Macphail (1890–1954) – first female member of Parliament (MP)
- Thomas D'Arcy McGee PC (1825–1868)
- Beverley McLachlin PC LLD (hc) (born 1943) – chief justice of Canada
- James McMillan (1838–1902) – US senator from Michigan
- Cory Morgan (born 1971) – Alberta independence politician
- John Munro PC (1931–2003) – former Member of Parliament for Hamilton
- Papineau (1786–1871) – reformer and 1837 rebellion leader
- Pierre Poilievre (born 1979) – member of Parliament, leader of the Conservative Party of Canada and the leader of the Official Opposition
- Allan Studholme (1846–1919) – trade unionist and Labour MLA
- Nathan Eldon Tanner (1898–1982) – former Member of the Legislative Assembly of Alberta for Cardston

=== Provincial premiers ===
Main articles:

- List of premiers of Alberta
- List of premiers of British Columbia
- List of premiers of Manitoba
- List of premiers of New Brunswick
- List of premiers of Newfoundland and Labrador
- List of premiers of Nova Scotia
- List of premiers of Ontario
- List of premiers of Prince Edward Island
- List of premiers of Quebec
- List of premiers of Saskatchewan

=== Territorial premiers ===
Main articles:

- List of premiers of the Northwest Territories
- List of premiers of Nunavut
- List of premiers of Yukon

=== Indigenous leaders ===
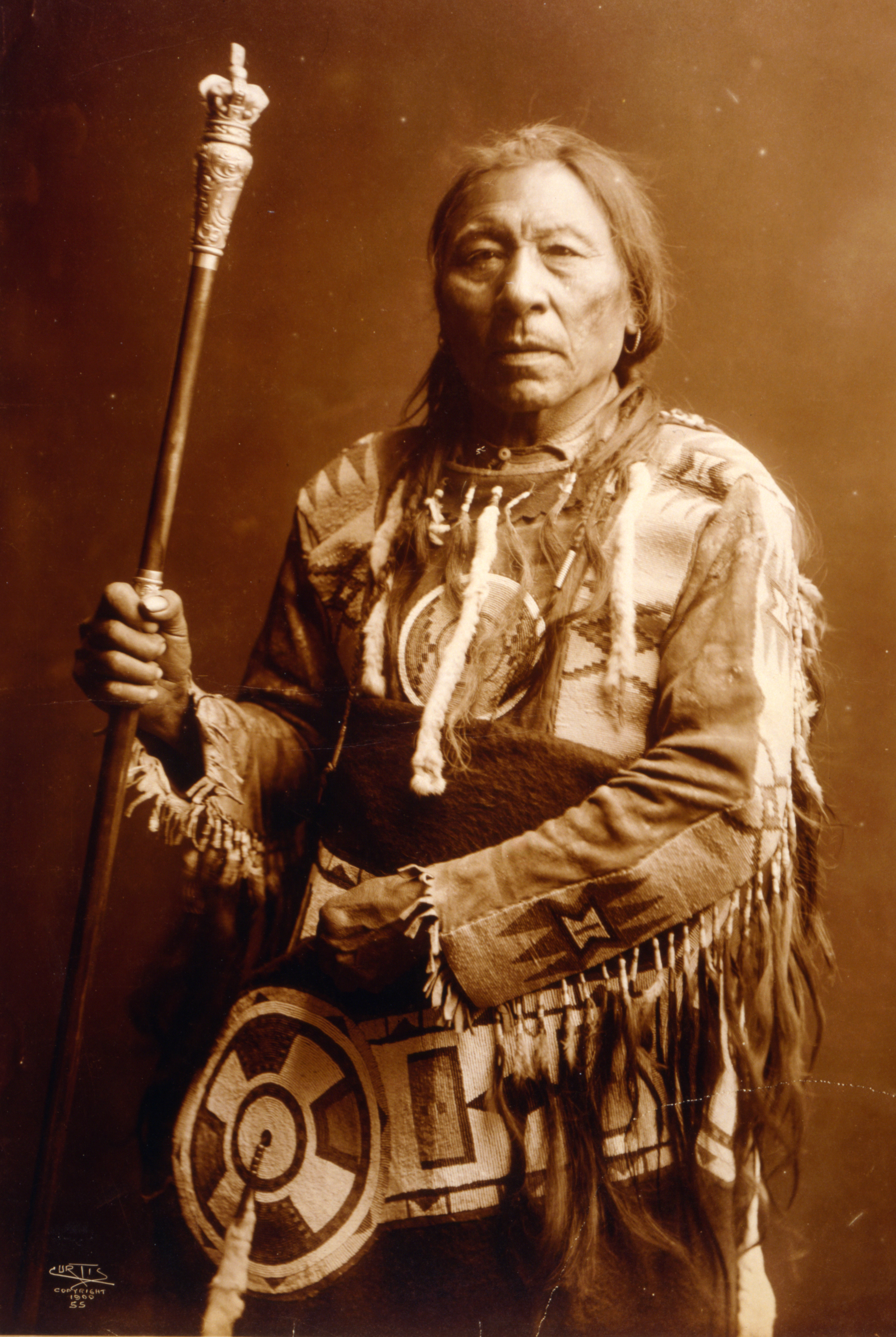
Aatsista-Mahkan, taken by Edward Curtis

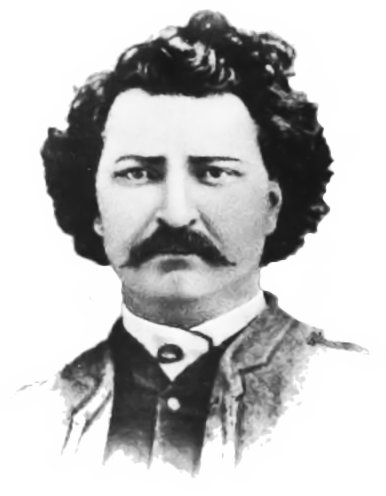
Louis Riel, leader of the Red River Rebellion and North-West Rebellion

- Shawn Atleo (born 1967)
- William Beynon (1888–1958)
- Big Bear (1825–1888) – Cree leader
- Joseph Brant (1742–1807) – Mohawk leader
- Mary Brant (1736–1796) – leader of Six Nations women's federation
- Frank Calder (1877–1943) – Nisga'a
- Joe Capilano (c. 1854–1910) – Squamish
- Rose Charlie (1930–2018)
- Arthur Wellington Clah (1831–1916)
- Heber Clifton (1871–1964)
- Cumshewa – 18th-century Haida chief at the inlet now bearing his name
- Harley Desjarlais
- Alfred Dudoward (ca. 1850–1914)
- Dan George (1899–1981) – Tsleil-Waututh (Burrard)
- Joseph Gosnell (1936–2020) – Nisga'a
- Simon Gunanoot (1874–1933) – Gitxsan
- Guujaaw (born 1953) – modern-day Haida leader
- Elijah Harper (1949–2013) – Cree
- Chief Hunter Jack (died 1905) – St'at'imc
- Mary John, Sr. (1913–2004)
- August Jack Khatsahlano (1877–1971) – Squamish
- Klattasine (died 1864) – Tsilhqot'in war chief, surrendered on terms of amnesty in times of war, hanged for murder
- Koyah (fl. 1787–1795) – 18th-century chief of the Haida
- George Manuel (1921–1989)
- Maquinna – 18th-century Nuu-chah-nulth chief (Yuquot/Mowachaht)
- Harriet Nahanee (1935–2007) – Squamish and Nuu-chah-nulth (Pacheedaht)
- Nicola (1780/1785–c. 1865) – Grand chief of the Okanagan people, and jointly chief of the Nlaka'pamux-Okanagan-Nicola Athapaskan alliance in the Nicola Valley and of the Kamloops group of the Secwepemc
- Andy Paull (1892–1959) – Squamish
- Stewart Phillip – Okanagan leader
- Chief Poundmaker (c. 1842–1886) – Cree chief
- Piapot (c. 1816–1908) – Cree chief
- Steven Point (born 1951) – modern Sto:lo leader, current Lieutenant-Governor of British Columbia
- Louis Riel (1844–1885) – leader of two Métis rebellions before being hung for treason
- James Sewid (1913–1988) – Kwakwaka'wakw
- Tecumseh (1768–1813) – Shawnee leader
- Alec Thomas (1894–?) – Tseshaht politician
- Wickanninish – 19th-century Nuu-chah-nulth chief (Opitsaht/Tla-o-qui-aht)
- Walter Wright (died 1949)
- Muriel Stanley Venne (1937–2024) – Métis community leader and Indigenous rights activist

== Religious figures ==
=== Martyrs ===
- St. Marguerite Bourgeoys (1620–1700) – first Canadian saint
- St. Noël Chabanel (1613–1649) – Jesuit missionary
- St. Anthony Daniel (1601–1648) – Jesuit missionary
- St. Jean de Brébeuf (1593–1649) – Jesuit missionary
- St. Jean de Lalande (died 1646) – Jesuit missionary
- St. Saint Charles Garnier (1606–1649) – Jesuit missionary
- St. René Goupil (1608–1642) – first North American martyr of the Roman Catholic Church
- St. Isaacs Jogues (1607–1646) – Jesuit missionary
- St. Gabriel Lallemant (1610–1649) – Jesuit missionary

=== Religious community leaders ===
- Alexis André (1832–1893) – Catholic missionary priest, spiritual advisor to Louis Riel
- Aloysius Matthew Ambrozic (1930–2011) – archbishop emeritus of Toronto
- André Besette (1845–1937) – Holy Cross Brother known as the "Miracle Man of Montreal"
- Linda Bond (born 1946) – General of The Salvation Army, 2011–2013
- Arnold Brown (1913–2002) – General of The Salvation Army, 1977–81
- Hugh B. Brown (1883–1975) – Latter-day Saint apostle
- Ranj Dhaliwal (born 1976) – Sikh, writer, activist and co-founder of the Sikh Youth orthodox political party in Surrey, British Columbia
- Lionel Groulx (1878–1967) – Roman Catholic priest, historian, nationalist, and traditionalist
- Albert Lacombe (1827–1916) – Roman Catholic missionary
- John G. Lake (1870–1935) – leader of the Pentecostal Movement, born in St. Marys, Ontario
- Cardinal Paul-Émile Léger (1904–1991) – Catholic clergyman and humanitarian
- Merlin Lybbert (1926–2001) – general authority of the Church of Jesus Christ of Latter-day Saints
- David Mainse (1936–2017) – broadcaster, founder of 100 Huntley Street and CITS-TV
- Aimee Semple McPherson (1890–1944) – founder of the Foursquare Church
- William D. Morrow – general superintendent of the Pentecostal Assemblies of Canada
- Bishop Michael Power (1804–1847) – Roman Catholic bishop of Toronto
- Alexandre-Antonin Taché (1823–1894) – Roman Catholic priest, missionary of the Oblate order
- Nathan Eldon Tanner (1898–1982) – Latter-day Saint apostle
- John Taylor (1808–1887) – president of the Church of Jesus Christ of Latter-day Saints
- Kateri Tekakwitha (1656–1680) – "the Lily of the Mohawks", first Native American canonized as a saint by the Catholic Church
- Rúhíyyih Khanum (1910–2000) – wife of Shoghi Effendi, the head of the Baháʼí Faith until 1957; she was appointed as a Hand of the Cause; in 2004, CBC viewers voted her number 44 on the list of "greatest Canadians" on the television show The Greatest Canadian
- Bramwell Tillsley (1931–2019) – general of The Salvation Army, 1993–1994
- Clarence Wiseman (1907–1985) – general of The Salvation Army, 1974–1977

=== Religious cult figures ===
- Roch Thériault (1947–2011) – cult leader
- Brother XII (1878–1934) – cult leader

== Scholars ==
- Louise Arbour (born 1947) – jurist
- Marc van Audenrode (born 1961) – economist
- Pratima Bansal – economist
- Timothy Brook (born 1951) – professor, historian and writer
- Joseph-Alphonse-Paul Cadotte (1897–1979) – professor, author
- Jack Chambers (1938–2026) – linguist
- Thomas H. Clark (1893–1996) – McGill geology professor, namesake of Thomasclarkite
- Gerald Cohen (1941–2009) – Oxford philosopher
- Northrop Frye (1912–1991) – influential critic, Shakespeare and Blake scholar
- John Kenneth Galbraith (1908–2006) – economist
- George Grant (1918–1988) – philosopher
- John Peters Humphrey (1905–1995) – legal scholar, principal drafter of the Universal Declaration of Human Rights
- Harold Innis (1894–1952) – political economist; author of seminal works on Canadian economic history, media and communications
- Marshall McLuhan (1911–1980) – communications theorist, coined phrases "the medium is the message" and "global village"
- Steven Pinker (born 1954) – psychologist, cognitive scientist, writer of popular science
- John Ralston Saul (born 1947) – businessman, essayist, diplomat
- F. R. Scott (1899–1985) – law professor, philosopher, poet
- Guy Sylvestre (1918–2010) – literary critic
- David Sztybel (born 1967) – philosopher
- Charles Taylor (born 1931) – philosopher
- William R. White (born 1943) – economist
- Marc Zender – Mayanist

== Scientists ==
- Robert Campbell Aitken (born 1963) – electrical engineer
- Judie Alimonti (1960–2017) – immunologist
- Sidney Altman (1939–2022) – molecular biologist, winner of Nobel Prize in chemistry
- Brenda Andrews (born 1957) – academic, researcher and biologist specializing in systems biology and molecular genetics.
- Albert Bandura (1925–2021) – psychologist
- Neil Banerjee – earth scientist
- Karen Bailey – plant pathologist
- Karen Beauchemin (born 1956) – livestock ruminant nutrition
- Robert Bell FRSC (1841–1917) – geologist
- Walter A. Bell (1889–1969) – geologist, paleontologist
- Manjul Bhargava (born 1974) – mathematician and Fields medallist
- Selwyn G. Blaylock ScD (hc) (1879–1945) – chemist and mining executive
- Stewart Blusson OC (born 1939) – geologist, diamond prospector, multimillionaire and philanthropist
- Adolfo J. de Bold (1942–2021) – biomedical scientist, discoverer of hormone secreted by heart muscle cells
- Willard Boyle (1924–2011) – inventor of the charge coupled device, winner of Nobel Prize in Physics
- Bertram Brockhouse CC FRSC (1918–2003) – designer of the Triple-Axis Neutron Spectrometer, winner of Nobel Prize for Physics
- Georges Brossard CM CQ ScD (hc) (1940–2019) – entomologist, television personality and founder of the Montreal Insectarium
- Moira Brown – North Atlantic right whale researcher and conservationist
- Vernon Burrows (1930–2020) – oat breeder
- John J. Clague FRSC (born 1946) – authority in quaternary and environmental earth sciences
- Kate Crooks (1833–1871) – botanist
- Claire Cupples – microbiologist
- Philip J. Currie (born 1949) – palaeontologist
- John William Dawson CMG FRS FRSC (1820–1899) – first Canadian-born scientist of worldwide reputation
- Duncan R. Derry LLD (hc) (1906–1987) – economic geologist
- Raymond Desjardins – agrometeorologist
- Donald B. Dingwell – earth scientist
- Martine Dorais – plant physiologist, organic horticulture
- Robert John Wilson Douglas FRSC (1920–1979) – petroleum geologist
- Eugenia Duodu – chemist
- Lorne Elias – chemist, inventor of the explosives vapour detector EVD-1
- John Charles Fields FRS FRSC (1863–1932) – mathematician and founder of the Fields Medal
- J. Keith Fraser (born 1922) – geographer
- Hu Gabrielse (1926–2024) – geologist with the Geological Survey of Canada
- William Giauque (1895–1982) – Nobel Prize winner in chemistry
- Anne-Claude Gingras – molecular geneticist
- Cynthia Grant – soil fertility and crop nutrition specialist
- Donald O. Hebb FRS (1904–1985) – neuroscientist, published his theory of Hebbian learning
- Gerhard Herzberg PC CC ScD (hc) LLD (hc) FRSC FRS (1904–1999) – Nobel Prize winner in chemistry for molecular spectroscopy
- James Hillier OC (1915–2007) – inventor of the electron microscope
- Vanessa M. Hirsch – veterinary pathologist and virologist
- Paul F. Hoffman OC FRSC (born 1941) – geologist noted for research into Snowball Earth events
- Edward A. Irving CM ScD (hc) FRSC FRS (1927–2014) – provided the first physical evidence of continental drift
- Charles Legge (1829–1881) – civil engineer
- Victor Ling CC (born 1944) – medicine, drug resistance in cancer
- Sir William Edmond Logan FRS (1798–1875) – founded the Geological Survey of Canada
- Mary MacArthur – botanist, cytologist, horticulturalist
- John Macoun (1831–1920) – botanist
- Tak Wah Mak (born 1946) – immunologist who discovered the T-cell receptor
- Claude Hillaire-Marcel FRSC (born 1943) – world leader in quaternary research
- Rudolph A. Marcus (born 1923) – Nobel Prize in chemistry recipient for electron transfer reactions
- Jerrold E. Marsden (1942–2010) – applied mathematician, founder of the Fields Institute
- Ernest McCulloch CC FRSC FRS (1926–2011) – cellular biologist who, with James Till, demonstrated the existence of stem cells
- Maud Menten (1879–1960) – medical scientist, made groundbreaking work in enzyme kinetics
- Robert Mundell (1932–2021) – economist and Nobel laureate
- John Charles Polanyi PC CC FRSC FRS (born 1929) – Nobel Prize in chemistry recipient for infrared chemiluminescence
- Isabella Preston (1881–1965) – ornamental horticulturalist
- Raymond A. Price OC ScD (hc) FRSC (1933–2024) – geologist
- Thayyoor K. Radka (born 1936) – Indian-born physicist
- Hubert Reeves CC OQ (1932–2023) – astrophysicist and science popularizer
- Soon Jai Park (1937–2018) – dry bean breeder
- Elizabeth Pattey – agricultural micrometeorologist
- Henry de Puyjalon (1841–1905) – biologist and ecologist
- Carmelle Robert (born 1962) – astrophysicist
- Laurie Rousseau-Nepton – astrophysicist, first indigenous woman in Quebec to obtain a PhD in astrophysics
- Donald F. Sangster LLD (hc) ScD (hc) FRSC – geologist
- Charles E. Saunders (1867–1937) – agronomist
- Arthur Schawlow (1921–1999) – Nobel Prize winner in physics (for lasers)
- David Schindler OC (1940–2021) – limnologist
- Myron Scholes (born 1941) – Nobel Prize winner in economics
- Yoshua Bengio (born 1964) – computer scientist and winner of the Turing Award
- Karen Schwartzkopf-Genswein – animal ethologist
- Hans Selye CC (1907–1982) – pioneering stress researcher
- Michael Smith CC OBE (1932–2000) – Nobel Prize winner in chemistry for site-based mutagenesis
- Ralph M. Steinman (1943–2011) – Nobel Prize winner in Physiology or Medicine for the discovery of the dendritic cell and its role in adaptive immunity
- Peter A Stewart (1921–1993) – physiologist, quantitative acid-base physiology
- Donna Strickland (born 1959) – Nobel Prize winner in Physics, optical physicist and pioneer in the field of pulsed lasers
- Richard Summerbell (born 1956) – mycologist
- David Suzuki CC OBC LLD (hc) ScD (hc) ScDEnv (hc) ScDComm (hc) DHL (hc) (born 1936) – geneticist and science popularizer
- Felicitas Svejda (1920–2016) – horticulturalist
- Henry Taube FRSC (1915–2005) – Nobel Prize in chemistry for electron transfer reactions
- Richard Taylor CC FRSC FRS (1929–2018) – Nobel Prize in physics recipient for verifying the quark theory
- James Till CC FRS (1931–2025) – biophysicist who, with Ernest McCulloch, demonstrated the existence of stem cells
- Joseph Tyrrell (1858–1957) – geologist, cartographer, discoverer of dinosaur bones in Alberta
- William Vickrey (1914–1996) – Nobel Prize winner in economics
- Isabel Jocelyn Waldbauer (1905–1968) – physicist who worked on radioactivity with Marie Curie
- Harold Williams FRSC (1934–2010) – geologist, expert on the Appalachian Mountains
- John Tuzo Wilson CC OBE ScD (hc) FRSC FRS FRSE (1908–1993) – geophysicist, expert in plate tectonics

== Viceroys ==
- List of governors general of Canada
  - List of lieutenant governors of Alberta
  - List of lieutenant governors of British Columbia
  - List of lieutenant governors of Manitoba
  - List of lieutenant governors of New Brunswick
  - List of lieutenant governors of Newfoundland and Labrador
  - List of lieutenant governors of Nova Scotia
  - List of lieutenant governors of Ontario
  - List of lieutenant governors of Prince Edward Island
  - List of lieutenant governors of Quebec
  - List of lieutenant governors of Saskatchewan

== Other personalities ==
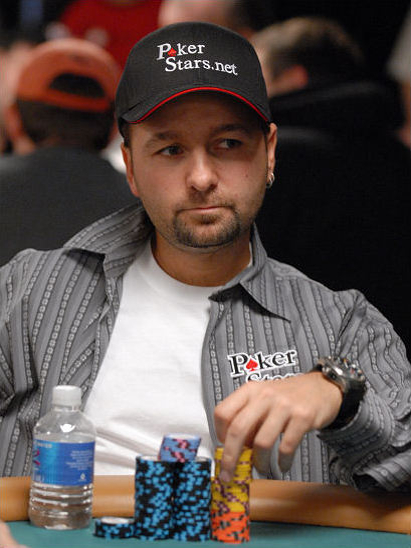
Daniel Negreanu

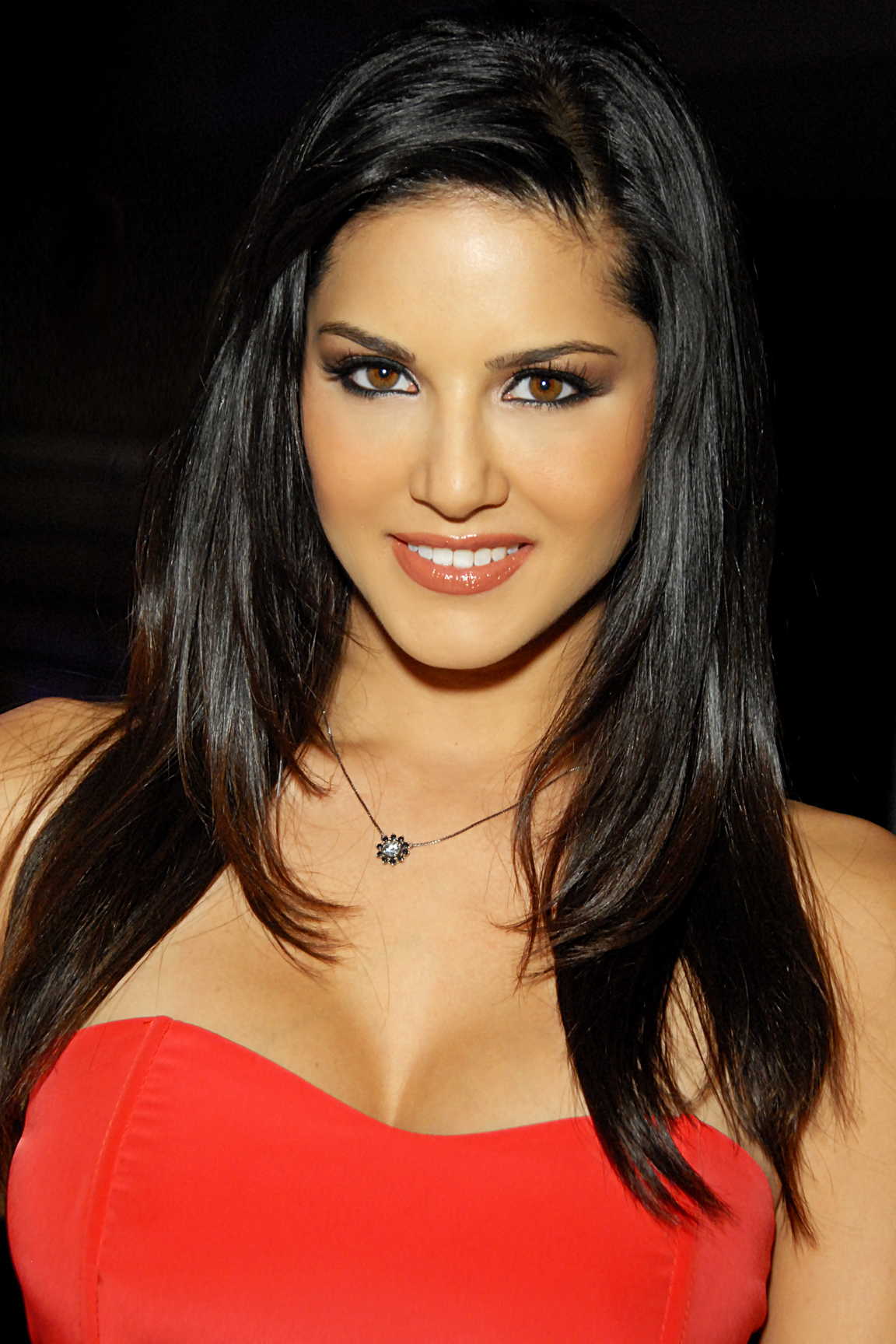
Sunny Leone

- Janis Babson (1950–1961) – organ donor, subject of two books
- Antonio Barichievich (1925–2003) (known as The Great Antonio) – strongman, showman, and eccentric
- Grant Bristow (born 1958) – CSIS undercover agent who started the Heritage Front, planted as political operative within Reform Party
- William J. Bruce III – author, producer and celebrity publicist
- Donnelly family (known as the Black Donnellys) – participants and/or victims of a vicious community feud
- Dylan Ehler (born 2017) – child who mysteriously disappeared in 2020
- Josiah Henson (1789–1883) – former slave, believed to be the inspiration for Uncle Tom's Cabin
- Marshal Iwaasa (born 1993) – man who mysteriously disappeared in 2019
- Trevor James (born 1988) – YouTuber
- Harold Kandel (1906–1995) – legendary theatregoer from Toronto, Ontario known for speaking out during theatre events, now commemorated through the Harold Awards
- Marc Karam (born 1980) – professional poker player
- Cindy Kenny-Gilday (born 1954) – Indigenous rights activist
- Anna Ruth Lang CV – recipient of the Cross of Valour
- Devon Larratt (born 1975) – professional armwrestler
- Sunny Leone (born 1981) – Canadian and Indian pornographic actress; Bollywood actress
- René Lepage de Sainte-Claire (1656–1718) – lord-founder of Rimouski, Quebec
- Bat Masterson (1853–1921) – gunfighter, fight promoter, sports journalist
- Marie-Louise Meilleur (1880–1998) – oldest Canadian person in history and the 6th oldest known person in history (as of January 2026)
- Charles Vance Millar (1853–1926) – lawyer, financier, and posthumous practical joker
- Sorel Mizzi (born 1986) – professional poker player
- John Wilson Murray (1840–1906) – Canada's first major detective
- Daniel Negreanu (born 1974) – professional poker player
- Karen O'Shannacery (born 1950) – homeless advocate
- Minnie Patterson (died 1911) – heroine noted for her daring rescue of everyone on board the barkentine (barque) Coloma during a severe storm in 1906
- Sue Rodriguez (1950–1994) – amyotrophic lateral sclerosis (ALS) sufferer and right to die advocate
- Alexander Milton Ross (1832–1897) (known as The Birdman) – pre-American Civil War abolitionist and participant in the Underground Railroad
- Craig Russell (1948–1990) – female impersonator and actor
- Laura Secord (1775–1868) – heroine of the War of 1812, warned the British of a surprise American attack at Battle of Beaver Dams
- Chris Sky (born 1983) – conspiracy theorist
- Joshua Slocum (1844–1909) – first man to sail around the world solo
- Byron Sonne, activist
- Alexandre Trudeau (born 1973) – author, filmmaker and journalist
- Margaret Trudeau (born 1948) – widow; former wife of Pierre Elliott Trudeau
- Sarah Rowell Wright (1862–1930), reformer, newspaper editor, and suffragist

== Fictional characters ==
- Amuro Ray – main character in the mecha anime Mobile Suit Gundam and varying roles in subsequent sequels
- Ike Broflovski – character on South Park
- Tom Evans (known as Captain Canuck) – cartoon character
- Benton Fraser – Mountie on the 90s television show Due South
- James Howlett (aka "Logan", aka "Wolverine") – member of the X-Men
- Justin Jones from Justin Time
- Rodney McKay – character on Stargate SG-1 and Stargate Atlantis
- Bob and Doug McKenzie – characters on SCTV
- Darren Oak (known as Captain Canuck) – cartoon character
- Trevor Philips – one of the three protagonists of Grand Theft Auto V
- Scott Pilgrim – from the graphic novel series of the same name
- Sergeant William Preston – heroic Mountie of radio and TV series from the 1950s
- Peter Puck – Hockey Night in Canada symbol from the 1970s
- Robin Scherbatsky – supporting character on the sitcom How I Met Your Mother
- Dave Semple (known as Captain Canuck) – cartoon character
- Anne Shirley – known as Anne of Green Gables
- Terrance and Phillip – characters on South Park
- Wade Wilson (aka "Deadpool") – comic book anti-hero

== Other ==
National

- Persons of National Historic Significance (Canada)
- List of companions of the Order of Canada
- List of inductees of Canada's Walk of Fame
- The Greatest Canadian

Groupings and articles of relevance

- Aboriginal Canadian personalities
- Asian Canadians
- Black Canadians
- European Canadians
- List of First Nations people
- List of Canadian Jews
- List of Canadians by net worth

Geographic

- Lists of Canadians by city

Lists by province/territory
