= Mary Patterson =

Mary Patterson may refer to:

- Mary Patterson (politician) (1927–2016), American singer and politician
- Mary Patterson Clark (born 1936), Canadian architect
- Mary Jane Patterson (1840–1894), first African-American woman to receive a B.A degree
- Mary Marvin Breckinridge Patterson (1905–2002), American photojournalist, cinematographer, and philanthropist
- Mary Michael Patterson, American theater actress and singer
- Mary Patterson Elkinton Nitobe (1857–1938), American-Quaker; wife of Japanese economist Nitobe Inazō
- Mary Patterson McPherson (born c. 1935), American educator
- Mary Baker Eddy (1821–1910), American religious leader known for a short time as Mary Patterson
- Mary Sampson Patterson Leary Langston (c. 1835–1915), née Patterson, American abolitionist, the first African-American woman to attend Oberlin College
- Mary King (news editor) (1885–1975), married name Patterson, American news editor

== See also ==
- Mary A. Patterson Memorial, memorial to the wife of Monroe Patterson
- Mary Paterson (1864–1941), British factory inspector and philanthropist
