= Oancia =

Oancia is a Romanian surname. Notable people with the surname include:

- David Oancia (1929–1995), Canadian journalist
- Ecaterina Oancia (1954–2024), Romanian rower
