= Taryn =

- Pronunciation: /ˈtɛərɪn/ TAIR-in /ˈtærɪn/ TARR-in
- Gender: Feminine

Origin
- Origin: English
- Region of origin: English-speaking world, but mostly popular in the United States, Canada and Australia and to a lesser extent in South Africa

Other names
- Related names: Taren, Taran, Tarina, Tarnia, Tarren, Tarryn, Taryna, Tarynn, Tarina, Teryn, Tarun

Taryn is an English feminine given name of various meanings, but mostly popular in the United States, Canada and Australia and a lesser extent in South Africa.

Notable people with the name include:

- Taryn Brumfitt (born c. 1978), Australian body positivity advocate, writer, and filmmaker
- Taryn Davidson (born 1991), Canadian model
- Taryn Fiebig (1972–2021), Australian opera and musical theatre soprano and cellist
- Taryn Foshee (born 1985), American beauty pageant contestant
- Taryn Heather (born 1982), Australian racing cyclist
- Taryn Hemmings (born 1986), American soccer defender
- Taryn Hosking (born 1981), South African field hockey player
- Taryn Manning (born 1978), American actress, singer-songwriter, and fashion designer
- Taryn Marler (born 1988), Australian actress
- Taryn Onofaro (born 1979), Australian television presenter
- Taryn Power (1953–2020), American actress
- Taryn Rockall (born 1977), Australian soccer player
- Taryn Simon, (born 1975) American artist who has worked in photography, text, sculpture, and performance
- Taryn Delanie Smith (born 1997/1998), African-American beauty pageant competitor
- Taryn Southern (born 1986), American actress, singer & songwriter, and model
- Taryn Suttie (born 1990), Canadian track and field athlete
- Taryn Swiatek (born 1981), Canadian soccer player
- Taryn Terrell (born 1985), American model, professional wrestler, ring announcer, and referee
- Taryn Thomas (born 1983), American pornographic actress, director, and model
- Taryn Woods (born 1975), Australian water polo player

== See also ==
- Tarryn, a unisex given name
