= Guillimin =

Guillimin is a French surname. Notable people with the surname include:

- Charles Guillimin (1676–1739), Canadian entrepreneur
- Timothée Guillimin (born 1996), French rugby union player
