= T. K. Radha =

Indian theoretical physicist, research scientist, scholar, educator and author

- തയ്യൂർ കെ. രാധ
- Born: Thayyoor K Radha; 1938 (age 87–88); Thrissur, Thayyur, Erumapetty, Kerala, British Raj
- Citizenship: Indian-Canadian
- Education: Stella Maris College, Chennai; Presidency College, Madras; University of Madras; University of Alberta
- Occupations: theoretical physicist, research scientist, scholar, educator and author
- Organization: Institute of Mathematical Sciences, Chennai
- Known for: specialisation in Particle Physics, Quantum Physics, Computational physics, Computer Science
- Spouse: Vembu Gourishankar
- Children: 1 (daughter)

Thayyoor K. Radha (married name Gourishankar; Malayalam: തയ്യൂർ കെ. രാധ;born 1938, popularly known as T. K. Radha in academic circles) is an Indian-Canadian theoretical physicist, educator and author. She specialised in the fields of Particle physics, Quantum mechanics and Computational physics in a career spanning over five decades. She was part of the research group of the Indian science researcher Alladi Ramakrishnan. Radha was one of the earliest women of colour and one of the few Indian women to have been invited to join the Institute for Advanced Study, Princeton. She worked with American physicist Robert J. Oppenheimer during her visit to Institute for Advanced Study.

== Biography ==
T. K. Radha was born in 1938 in Thrissur, Thayyur, a tiny village near Erumapetty in the state of Kerala, British Raj. She spent her childhood at a time, when restrictions were imposed on girls regarding their decisions on career choices and education. She was born as the fourth child in a typical Indian orthodox traditional family (third girl child in her family) and she had four siblings. She read books and engaged in studies under the dim light of kerosene lamps in Thayyur, as Thayyur often faced electricity power outages and also Thayyur residents faced the prospect of electricity not being restored for weeks. Her house which had been located in Thayyur was surrounded by jackfruit, tamarind, and coconut trees.

She along with her family members shifted housing locations often due to her father's government job which had uncertainties over securing a permanent fixed workplace. Her father was given transfers owing to the demanding hectic schedule of a government position. Eventually, Radha was raised between Madras (now Chennai) and Ernakulam. She learnt Malayalam and Sanskrit languages at her primary school. As her sisters understood that she could obtain good grades at school, they convinced their parents to send Radha to study at intermediate level (now called class 11 and 12 in present-day India).

She was married to Vembu Gourishankar, a professor in the Department of electrical engineering at the University of Alberta. Her name was changed to Radha Gourishankar after her marriage. Due to her name change (considering the Indian traditional societal culture, where the name of husband would automatically combine with the woman's first name) many historians and scholars found it difficult at one point to trace and archive her career achievements and research works. The couple settled in Canada soon after their marriage.

She currently lives in Edmonton, Canada with her daughter.

== Career ==
Radha attended Stella Maris College, Chennai where she topped both the mathematics (100%) and physics (98%) streams. Despite having obtained the highest distinction pass marks in mathematics, she pursued her studies in physics as she was keenly interested in the subject. She was later enrolled at Presidency College, Madras in the field of physics to pursue a physics honours degree. Coincidentally her father was also an alumnus of Presidency College. However, she initially faced societal barriers to pursue her physics degree since the field was introduced as a co-education system and it was her mother who was reluctant to allow her due to do so in view of the male dominated co-education system prevailing at the time. Nevertheless, her father agreed with Radha's decision to focus on completing her degree in physics. She was also awarded a gold medal for her academic performance in physics at Presidency College. She she then attended the University of Madras and pursued her Master's degree in the field of nuclear physics under the supervision and guidance of Alladi Ramakrishnan. She obtained her Doctorate of Philosophy from the University of Madras in 1962. Radha also received an offer to attend lecture sessions conducted by Noble Prize laureates at the summer school on Elementary Particle Physics in Trieste, Italy. It was during her stay at the summer school that she received post-doctoral fellowships, suchas the post-doctoral fellowship at Stanford University she obtained under the guidance of physicist Leonard I. Schiff in 1963. In 1964, Radha co-authored a research article titled “Slow Neutron-Deuteron Capture and the Structure of 3H and 3He” with Leonard I. Schiff and N. T. Meister for the Physical Review. Subsequently, Schiff spoke about the work by Radha and Meoster at the International Conference of High Energy Physics and Nuclear Structure. Radha also collaborated with another female colleague R. Thunga to co-author several research papers. She also worked briefly at the University of Rochester where she gained a post-doctoral fellowship from Robert Marshak.

She recalled contacts with prominent physicists such as Robert Marshak, Niels Bohr, and Leonard Schiff who had regularly visited India attending college research workshops held. Her contacts with colleagues provided opportunities to engage in research activities in particle physics, which was considered highly significant the 1960s. Since then, she specialised in particle physics and gained expertise as she conducted extensive research activities over the years. In connection with particle physics, she began publishing scholarly articles in international journals. Radha published 14 research papers on quantum theory, Feynman propagators, particle interactions and particle physics, where she explained how tiny particles interact. Her research focused mainly on "Regge poles", a theory claiming how particles scatter when they collide against each other at high energy and at higher speed levels. Her research emphasised the complex mathematical symmetry of particles which was deemed as a case study guiding scientists to understand how they exchange properties during a collision. She worked on methods of calculating the probability of particle interactions and developed a blueprint for aspiring researchers on what to expect in their massive particle accelerators.

Radha and her colleagues were accompanied by the academic professor Alladi Ramakrishnan for a meeting discussion with then Prime Minister of India Jawaharlal Nehru and Education Minister C. Subramaniam to discuss the possibility of launching India's equivalent to the Institute for Advanced Study, Princeton, New Jersey. Alladi had intended to utilise such an institute to conduct scientific exploration to train his students including Radha. It was revealed that it was physicist Niels Bohr who insisted upon the idea to Alladi Ramakrishnan for the creation of an institute for advanced research. With support from the then Prime Minister of India Jawaharlal Nehru and Education Minister C. Subramaniam, Alladi Ramakrishan set out to establish the Institute of Mathematical Sciences, Chennai which became India's first fully-fledged modern institute for theoretical physics. Radha eventually joined the institute as a staff scientist and strikingly was one of only four women to be part of the institute in its early days.

In June 1965, Radha received a surprise academic invitation in a written letter from renowned American theoretical physicist Robert J. Oppenheimer who wished to discuss project works and research works with her, thereby initiating their scientific collaboration. She went onto serve under the directorship of Oppenheimer at the Princeton's Institute for Advanced Study. Prior to the invitation from Robert J. Oppenheimer, she had spent a brief stint as a lecturer in Australia. She was invited to stay at the Institute for Advanced Study from September 1965 to April 1966. She was one of the few Indian women and the few Malayalis to have been officially invited to the institute. She had one-one-one intellectual discussions with Oppenheimer who expressed his fondness of Bhagavad Gita which he insisted on reading in the Sanskrit language. Oppenheimer also told Radha that he had quoted some of the verses from the Bhagavad Gita when his experimental atom bomb went off, a scene which was later inscribed as one of the sequences in Christopher Nolan's directorial venture Oppenheimer (biopic film based on Robert J. Oppenheimer's life).

After migrating to Canada, Radha continued her academic career, enrolling in computational physics at the University of Alberta. She re-trained in computer science and served as a computer programmer analyst in the university's physics department for nearly 15 years. In her eighties, she engaged in corporate social responsibility and charity by volunteering to work in Edmonton's health services. As a result, she received the YMCA Woman of the Year award in 2014.
