= Tarryn =

Tarryn is a unisex given name. Notable people with the name include:

== Women ==
- Tarryn Aiken (born 1999), Australian rugby league footballer
- Tarryn Bright (born 1983), South African field hockey player
- Tarryn Davey (born 1996), New Zealand field hockey player
- Tarryn Fisher (born 1983), South African-born novelist based in United States
- Tarryn Glasby (born 1995), South African field hockey player
- Tarryn Stokes (born 1983), Australian singer-songwriter, winner of the twelfth season of The Voice Australia

== Men ==
- Tarryn Allarakhia (born 1997), English footballer
- Tarryn Thomas (born 2000), Australian rules footballer

== See also ==
- Taryn, a feminine given name
