= Kenneth Ratte =

Canadian citizen (born 1963)

- Born: 1963 (age 62–63)
- Known for: Threatening to infect prison guards and fellow inmates with AIDS

Kenneth Ratte is a Canadian citizen, who has been called a "career criminal". He has been convicted of over 60 crimes.

In 1991, he was identified as one of 34 convicts in custody in Canadian prisons who had been diagnosed with an AIDS infection. In 1991 guards, calling upon the terms of their union's contract, argued that Ratte should be kept in isolation, because his infection posed a risk to their health. Ratte argued that this segregation violated his rights.

In 2000, Ratte was convicted of attacking guards, and trying to infect them. CBC News reported that Ratte requested a longer sentence so he would be held in federal, rather than provincial, custody, on the basis of being too dangerous for the latter. Ratte was escorted to court by four guards wearing body armour, gloves and protective eye-guards. Each guard was holding a leash attached to a collar.

In 2010, Ratte and two associates were convicted of a home invasion. Ratte agreed to testify against Tracy L. Caron, a Kingston area woman, who was charged with trying to hire someone to hurt Clifford Richards. Richards was murdered on 26 October 2010, at which time Ratte was already in custody, but he testified she discussed hiring someone to hurt Richards before Ratte's apprehension.

In June 2013, Ratte attacked Omar Khadr shortly after Khadr had been transferred to a prison in Edmonton.

Ratte received conditional release in March 2018. He was released under a peace bond that imposed an 11pm to 6am curfew upon him. After Ratte stayed out one night he asked a friend to phone his wife, and tell her he missed the curfew because he had been kidnapped by bikers. His wife took this story seriously, and informed police, and filed a missing person report. However, her daughter found him later that day, in their neighbourhood, smoking crystal meth. Ratte spent the next five months in jail.
