= Stephan Ouaknine =

Canadian business magnate

Stephan Ouaknine is a Canadian business magnate, best known for his activities in the telecommunications industry and in renewable energy. A native of Montreal, Ouaknine has been active at international events including the Clinton Global Initiative, the Durban World Climate Summit and the Rio+20 World Green Summit, and has been named one of Canada's most notable entrepreneurs by Profit magazine.

== Early life ==
Ouaknine, the son of Moroccan and Egyptian immigrants to Canada, attended McGill University and moved to the Israeli start-up industry, first joining a dot-com multimedia company then known as Geo-Interactive. As vice-president of business development, Ouaknine led the firm's 1996 IPO on the London Stock Exchange under the name Emblaze.

== Telecom industry ==
In 1998, Ouaknine founded Airslide Systems, an advanced telecommunications equipment company, from his home in Tel Aviv. He raised over $36 million in venture capital for this firm from investors including George Soros, Sequoia Capital, Intel and SingTel. The firm's assets were ultimately acquired by Dialogic Corporation.

After exiting Airslide, Ouaknine returned to Montreal to found Blueslice Networks in 2002. Blueslice produced evolved Subscriber Data Management (eSDM) solutions for mobile operators. The firm was acquired in 2010 by Morrisville-based Tekelec.

== Recent activities ==
Subsequently, to Blueslice's acquisition, Ouaknine moved to the renewable energy industry. With partners including Jigar Shah, founder of SunEdison, founded in 1959, Eric Ouaknine and Vincent Martel, Ouaknine founded Inerjys, a renewable energy and clean technology growth equity fund. At Inerjys, Ouaknine's activities have focused on a hybrid strategy of growth equity investment and infrastructure project finance, with the objective of accelerating the commercialization of innovative cleantech firms. Ouaknine has promoted this investment thesis at major international events including the Durban World Climate Summit, the Clinton Global Initiative, and the World Green Summit, a business conference affiliated with Rio+20. In 2017, Ouaknine was a guide in the March of the Living for teenagers.
