= T. H. Clark =

Canadian geologist (1893–1996)

Thomas Henry Clark, Ph.D., FRSC (December 3, 1893 – April 28, 1996) was a Canadian geologist who is considered to have been one of the nation's top scientists of the 20th century. He was a professor who authored over 100 scientific publications. After his death, a mineral was named in his honour.

Clark was born in London, England. He emigrated to the United States and attended Harvard University. In 1917, he graduated with an A.B. The start of World War I interrupted his studies. He enlisted in the U.S. Army Medical Corps (1917–19) and served in France. Clark returned to Harvard after the war and obtained his A.M. (1921) and Ph.D. (1923).

== Career ==
In 1924, Clark moved to Montreal to take an assistant professor position in the Geology Department at McGill University. He began by teaching geology, paleontology and stratigraphy. In 1926, Clark began a major project to map the geology of the Quebec Appalachian Mountains along the U.S. border in the Eastern Townships. He published a series of papers on the geology and paleontology of the Townships. These papers established him as a leading geologist in Canada.

In 1927, he married Olive Marguerite Melvenia Prichard, a former student. They had a daughter, Joan.

Clark served as Director of McGill's Redpath Museum from 1932 to 1952. He was largely responsible for personally collecting many of the museum's fossils. After ten years, Clark shifted his focus away from the Eastern Townships. He discovered that early maps of Laval were incorrect, so he proposed the production of a completely new map of the Montreal area. He began that project as well as a project to map the St. Lawrence lowlands in 1938. By the late 1960s, Montreal's development and various projects along the St. Lawrence seaway necessitated a revision of Clark's previous geological studies of the area. He was charged with undertaking the field work. This time the work involved capturing information from the many oil and gas and engineering projects, as well as acquiring core samples from excavations for future research.

Over the years, Clark authored more than 100 scientific publications. He co-authored with Colin W. Stearn The Geological Evolution of North America (1960), which was a standard text in university-level geology.

Clark retired at the age of 100, after 69 years at McGill, in May 1993. He died in Montreal three years later.

== Positions held ==
- 1933-1962, Logan Professor of Paleontology at McGill University
- 1930-1932, Curator of Redpath Museum
- 1932-1952, Director of Redpath Museum
- 1953-1954, President of the Geological Science Section of the Royal Society of Canada
- 1958-1959, President of the Geological Association of Canada
- 1963 Professor Emeritus at McGill University
- 1964-1992, Advisor in Geology at the Redpath Museum

== Awards and honours ==
- 1930, awarded the Harvard Centennial Medal
- 1933, made Fellow of the Royal Society of Canada
- 1971, awarded the Logan Medal
- 1993, awarded the Prix Grand Mérite of the Association Professionnelle des Géologues et Géophysiciens du Québec
- 1993, awarded the Centenary Medal of the Royal Society of Canada
- 1997, the mineral Thomasclarkite was named in his honour
