= Joseph-Alphonse-Paul Cadotte =

Canadian academic (1897–1979)

- Cadotte, circa 1930
- Born: 12 December 1897; Montreal, Quebec, Canada
- Died: 18 January 1979 (aged 81); Charlottetown, Prince Edward Island, Canada
- Occupations: Professor, author, RCAF Veteran
- Spouse: Albertine Dufresne (1931); Seraphine Benoit (1969),

Joseph-Alphonse-Paul Cadotte was a professor of mathematics, industrial engineering, industrial design at the École Polytechnique de Montréal, where he had achieved distinctions as a student. He also served as an education officer with the Royal Canadian Air Force. and authored several textbooks in applied industrial algebra and calculus.

== Life ==
Cadotte was born in Montreal, Québec, Canada on December 12, 1897. He was the son of Alfred Cadotte, merchant-tailor, and Dorilda Coutu, his wife, daughter of A. Coutu, of Saint-Gabriel de Brandon.

Cadotte attended primary school at the Jardin de l'Enfance, and took science courses at the Collège Mont-Saint-Louis fr:Collège Mont-Saint-Louis, a private secondary school. He attended l'École Polytechnique de Montréal for two years before finishing his studies at the École Technique, where he distinguished himself by completing in only one year, a complete course on industrial engineering where the majority of his work was published in the school's academic journal (les annales de l'École), and by winning the gold medal from the provincial government bestowed upon the most deserving student. Cadotte graduated with high distinction in 1919.

During the same year, Cadotte was appointed regular professor in mathematics, industrial engineering and industrial design at the École Technique. Although relatively young, he was nonetheless considered an authority on technical education.

Cadotte was absorbed in his work and devoted almost exclusively to the education of his many students. He was considered an attractive man of athletic build and was adept in several sports, indoor and outdoor. He most excelled in fitness, tennis, swimming and billiards. He was a key player in developing and promoting the game of tennis among French-Canadians. As a lifetime member of the l'Association Athlétique National, he endeavoured greatly in making the association an important institution in Canada.

On June 10, 1925, Cadotte married Albertine Dufresne, daughter of F.-X. Dufresne from Montreal. Together they had one son, Pierre M. Cadotte (1927-1996) . They resided at 4918 rue Adam in Montreal.

Later in life, Cadotte married Seraphine Benoit of Grand Bay, Dominica, where they met. He later moved to Charlottetown, Prince Edward Island, Canada with Seraphine, where he resided until his death. They had one son, John (Fred) Cadotte and a granddaughter, Serena Cadotte of Ottawa, Ontario.

Cadotte died on January 18, 1979 in Charlottetown, Prince Edward Island and was laid to rest at West River United Church Cemetery.

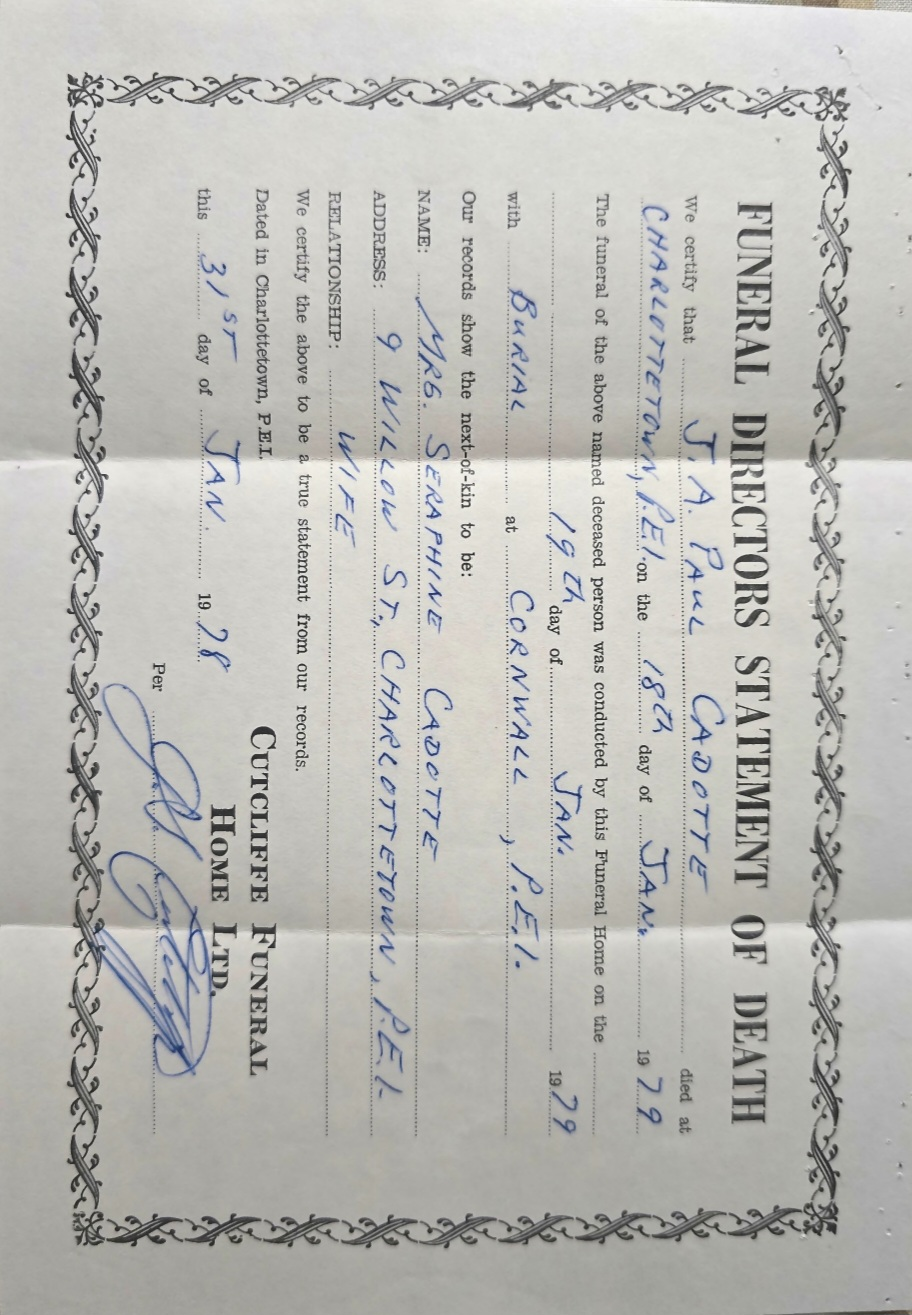
Death Certificate

== Academic contributions and works ==
Astute in mathematics, Cadotte represented École Technique at the First Canadian Mathematical Congress in 1945

Cadotte also presented a paper to the Royal Commission on Education (also known as the Parent Commission) on behalf of the l'école polytechnique de Montréal

Cadotte was the author of several mathematic textbooks, including:

- "Initiation au calcul différentiel et intégral avec applications industrielles. Exercices"

- J.-A.-Paul (Jean-Alphonse) Cadotte. Réimpr. Juil. 1961 – Montréal.
- J.-A. (Jean-Alphonse)-Paul Cadotte. 1949. Montréal.
- Théorie / par J.-A. (Jean-Alphonse)-Paul Cadotte. Réimpr. 1959 – Montréal.
- Théorie / par J.-A. (Jean-Alphonse)-Paul Cadotte. Réimpr. 1961 – Montréal.
- Théorie / par J.-A. (Jean-Alphonse)-Paul Cadotte. 1949 – Montréal.

- "Algèbre appliquée à l'industrie"

- tome I / J.-A. (Jean-Alphonse)-Paul Cadotte. 1950 – Montréal.
- Algèbre appliquée à l'industrie : tome II / J.-A. (Jean-Alphonse)-Paul Cadotte. 1946–1949. – Montréal.
