= Thayyur =

- village
- Interactive map of Thayyur
- Coordinates: 10°40′N 76°10′E
- Country: India
- State: Kerala
- District: Thrissur
- Established: 1895
- Talukas: Kunnamkulam

Area
  - Total: 26 km^{2} (10 sq mi)

Population (2011)
  - Total: 4,740
  - Density: 180/km^{2} (470/sq mi)

Languages
  - Official: Malayalam, English
- Time zone: UTC+5:30 (IST)
- PIN: 680584
- Telephone code: 04885
- Vehicle registration: KL-
- Nearest city: Erumapetty
- Lok Sabha constituency: Aalathur
- Vidhan Sabha constituency: Kunnamkulam

Thayyur is a village in Thrissur district in the state of Kerala, India.

Thayyur is administered under Velur Panchayat.
