= Neil Banerjee =

Canadian earth scientist

- Occupation: geologist

Neil R. Banerjee is a Canadian earth scientist researching the geologic history of the origins of life and also the structure of the Earth as recorded in oceanic sediments and rocks.

Banerjee graduated from Dalhousie University in 1996 with a M.Sc.

At the University of Victoria, Banerjee participated in NEPTUNE Canada's research in the Juan de Fuca Strait near Victoria, British Columbia.

As a staff scientist under contract with Texas A&M University, Banerjee managed an international research project, the Integrated Ocean Drilling Program, involving scientists from more than 20 countries. In 2005, the project successfully drilled through a complete sequence of the upper layers of the oceanic crust near Costa Rica and into a layer of igneous rock known as gabbro, which is formed from solidified magma. This was the first time such a feat had been accomplished in intact ocean crust and was ranked by Discover Magazine as one of the top eight Earth Science stories of 2006.

In 2007, Banerjee, now with the University of Western Ontario (UWO), led at team of Canadian scientists that announced the discovery of the "oldest indisputable evidence of life on Earth—the fossilized trackways of slithering microbes in a 3.35-billion-year-old rock from Australia. The Australia research, for the first time, used a laser-plasma mass spectrometer at the University of Alberta to precisely target tiny minerals and organic residues. As a result, the Canadian Space Agency is funding Banerjee's team for research into volcanic rocks in Canada's Abitibi region near Rouyn-Noranda, Quebec, and Kirkland Lake, Ontario that are similar to those in Australia.

In 2016, Banerjee was part of a UWO partnership that earned federal funding to partner with and more competitive for mining and medical device companies to make them more competitive. Banerjee is assessing the origin and character of gold deposits in Kirkland Lake mining camp.

== Publications ==
- 2002 - Discovery of ancient and active hydrothermal systems along the ultra-slow spreading Southwest Indian Ridge
- 2003 - Tuff life: bioalteration in volcaniclastic rocks from the Ontong Java Plateau
- 2004 - Early life recorded in Archean pillow lavas
- 2006 - Drilling to Gabbro in Intact Ocean Crust
- 2006 - Preservation of biosignatures in 3.5 Ga pillow lavas from the Barberton Greenstone Belt, South Africa
