= Saadia Muzaffar =

Canadian entrepreneur

Saadia Muzaffar is a Canadian entrepreneur, author and founder of TechGirls Canada (a non-profit organization created to promote women in STEM).

== Career ==
Muzaffar was born and raised in Karachi, Pakistan. Her father is an engineer. She emigrated to Canada with her family when she was 19 years old. She worked in the marketing department for AudienceView (an e-commerce company) for two years.

=== Advocacy in technology ===
In 2012, Muzaffar founded TechGirls Canada (TGC), which is a non-profit organization created to promote women in Science, Technology, Engineering, and Math. In particular, the organization focuses on promoting intersections in diversity, including women of colour, women with disabilities and Indigenous women. Muzaffar currently leads partnerships for TGC. Past TGC campaigns have included "Strength In Numbers" (which highlighted the decrease in gender diversity in technology in Canada over the past decade) and #PortraitsOfStrength campaign, which featured women who were breaking barriers in the technology fields. TGC has over ten chapters across Canada, which operate virtually.

Muzaffar also co-founded Tech Reset Canada, which is a group of business people, technologists, and other residents advocating for innovation that is focused on maximizing the public good. She also organizes Startup Weekends.

Alongside gender justice consultant Steph Guthrie, Muzaffar co-authored Change Together, which is a diversity guidebook for start-up companies. The two authors collaborated with The Working Group for a year to identify strategies to promote and implement diversity in start-ups and scale-ups.

In 2022, Muzaffar led and co-authored a study, titled Workfinding and Immigrant Women’s Prosperity in STEM, which involved structured one-on-one interviews of the journey to find work in Canada by 74 immigrant women in the fields of science, technology, engineering and mathematics (STEM). Among the findings, Muzaffar's team found that while 66% of immigrant women were optimistic about finding working before arriving in Canada, only 37% were able to express optimism after six months of having lived in Canada. Muzaffar's team identified the following common challenges: immigrant women would not receive a response or feedback following applications and/or interviews, being asked for 'Canadian experience', and lack of affordable childcare. Later, Muzaffar and Nadia Caidi (a professor at the University of Toronto, and a co-author of the Workfinding and Immigrant Women’s Prosperity in STEM study) received a grant from the Mitacs Accelerate program, and hired Elizabeth Kalbfleisch (a Master's student) to create a short animated film, titled We Were Here All Along, to share findings from the study.

=== Resignation from Waterfront Toronto Digital Strategy Advisory Panel ===
On 4 October 2018, Muzaffar quit her role as a member of the Waterfront Toronto Digital Strategy Advisory Panel for the Waterfront Toronto-backed project, where Google's sister company, Sidewalk Labs, will re-develop a 12-acre plot of land in Toronto to become a "smart city" known as SideWalk Toronto Muzaffar cited "deep dismay" and "profound concerns" for the project's data and digital infrastructure in her resignation letter, and noted that she had been the only person of colour on the city's advisory panel. She is the second person to have resigned from the originally 15-large advisory panel, and was soon followed by the resignation of former Ontario privacy commissioner Ann Cavoukian.

=== Recognition ===
Muzaffar was featured in the 2017 book Canada 150 Women, and was also named as one of the Inspiring 50 in 2018. She has previously been nominated for a Pushcart Prize for her short fiction writing.

In March 2023, Muzaffar joined Canadian Minister Marci Ien and Parliamentary Secretary Jenna Sudds as part of the Canadian Delegation to the 67th Session of the United Nations Commission on the Status of Women.

In September 2023, Muzaffar was recognized in Museum of Toronto's exhibit:The 52: Stories of Women Who Transformed Toronto.
