= Marc Van Audenrode =

Canadian economist

Marc A. Van Audenrode (born March 10, 1961) is a Canadian economist who is managing principal at Analysis Group, the largest privately held economic consulting firm in the United States, and an adjunct professor at Université de Sherbrooke.

Van Audenrode is an expert on labor economics and specializes in antitrust law, econometrics, and public economics. His research has been published in numerous peer-reviewed academic journals. He has also written articles for trade journals. Van Audenrode is a co-author of The Mutual Fund Industry: Competition and Investor Welfare (Columbia Business School Publishing, 2010).

== Career ==
Van Audenrode is an economic consultant and researcher, and has held teaching and department positions at Université du Québec à Montréal (UQAM) and Université Laval. He joined Analysis Group in 2003, as a vice president in the Canadian office. He is now a managing principal.

== Education ==
Van Audenrode pursued two bachelor's degrees, in economics and law, at Université catholique de Louvain, in Belgium. He then obtained a master's degree in economics from the same university, before continuing his education in the United States. He obtained a master's degree in economics from the University of California, Los Angeles, and a Ph.D. in economics from the University of California, Berkeley under the direction of Nobel prize winner George Akerlof .

== Published works ==
- The Mutual Fund Industry: Competition and Investor Welfare with R. Glenn Hubbard, Michael Koehn, Stanley Ornstein, and Jimmy Royer; Columbia Business School Publishing, April 2010.
- "The Impact of Drug Vintage on Patient Survival: A Patient Level Analysis Using Quebec's Provincial Health Plan Data" with Frank Lichtenberg, Paul Grootendorst, Patrick Lefebvre, and Dominic Latremouille-Viau; Value in Health, Vol. 12, Issue 6, pp. 847–856, September 2009.
- "Les besoins (quasi) illimités des familles " in Le Québec, un paradis pour les Familles? Luc Godbout et Suzie St-Cerny, eds. Presses de l’université Laval. 2008.
- "The Relative Dosing of Epoetin Alfa and Darbepoetin Alfa in Chronic Kidney Disease" with Pierre-Yves Cremieux and Patrick Lefebvre; Current Medical Research and Opinion, Vol. 22, pp. 2329–2336, 2006.
- "Border Regulations and Migratory Flows" in Social and Labour Market Aspects of North American Linkages, Richard G. Harris et Thomas Lemieux, eds., University of Calgary Press, 2005.
- "Where Does the Canadian Debt Come From? A Comment" in "Is the Debt War Over ?" Chris Ragan and Bill Watson, eds. IRPP, 2004.

"Sous-traitance, emploi et salaires." with Pierre Fortin. Revue Gestion. Vol. 29, No 2, pp. 33–38, 2004.

- "Double blind, Placebo-Controlled, Randomized Phase II Trial of Darbepoetin Alfa in Lung Cancer Patients Receiving Chemotherapy: A Comment" Journal of the National Cancer Institute, Vol. 95, pp. 761–762, 2003.
- "Les perspectives à moyen terme du marché du travail au Québec," L’Actualité économique, Vol. 78, No. 4, 2002.
- "Worker Displacement in Belgium and Denmark" with Karsten Albæk and Martin Browning in Worker Displacement in an International Context, Peter Kuhn, ed. W.E. Upjohn Institute for Employment Research, 2002.
- "Trade and the economics of Winners and Losers," Acts of the 1998 Seminar on Incomes and Productivity in North America. Commission for Labor Cooperation, Dallas, Texas. 1999
- "Introduction à la micro-économie moderne" with Michael Parkin and Robin Bade. Éditions du Renouveau Pédagogique. 1999
- "Compensations Policies and Firm Productivity" with Jonathan Leonard and Benoit Mulkay in The Creation and Analysis of Matched Employer-Employee Data, J. Haltiwanger et Al., eds., North-Holland. 1999.
- "Exploring the Links Between Wage Inequality and Unemployment: A Comparison of Canada and the U.S." with Paul Storer. Canadian Public Policy, Vol XXIV, pp. 233–253, February 1998.
- "Job Security Provisions: Everybody's favorite scapegoat" World Economic Affairs, Spring 1997.
- "Optimal Contract, Imperfect Output Observation and Limited Liability" with Jacques Lawarrée. The Journal of Economic Theory, Vol. 71, pp. 514–531. 1996.
- "Rent Sharing in the Airline Industry: Evidence from Mergers and Acquisitions" with Pierre-Yves Crémieux. Labour, Vol. 10, No. 2, pp. 297–318. 1996
- "Is the US/Canada Unemployment Gap Truly Large? A Labor Flow Analysis" with Pierre-Yves Cremieux in Flow Analysis of Labor Markets, Ronald Schettkat, ed. Rutledge.
- "Worker's Limited Liability, Turnover, and Employment Contracts" with Jonathan Leonard. Annales d’Economie et de Statistique, Vol. 41-42, 1996, pp. 41–77.
- "Some Myths about Monetary Policy" in Unnecessary Debts. Lars Osberg and Pierre Fortin, eds. Lorimer, 1996; reprinted in "Hard Money, Hard Times", Lars Osberg and Pierre Fortin, eds. Lorimer, 1998.
- "Unemployment Insurance Take-up Rates in Canada: Facts, Determinants and Implications" with Paul Storer. Canadian Journal of Economics, Vol. XXVIII, No. 4a, November 1995, pp. 822–835.
- "Job Displacement, Wages and Unemployment Duration in Canada" with Mario Houle. Labour Economics, Vol. 2, No. 1, March 1995, pp. 77–92.
- "Perspectives de réinsertion professionnelle des travailleurs déplacés peu éduqués" with Paul Storer. In "Intégration à l’emploi des personnes défavorisées." Les Publications du Québec, 1995, pp. 205–220.
- "Short Hours Compensation, Job Security and Employment Contracts: Evidence from Selected OECD Countries." Journal of Political Economy, Vol. 102, No. 1, February 1994, pp. 76–102.
- "Politiques industrielles et dynamique du marché du travail en Belgique" with Jonathan Leonard. Reflets et Perspectives de la Vie Economique. Vol. XXXIII, February 1994, pp. 73–86
- "Corporatism Run Amok: Job Stability and Industrial Policy in Belgium and the United States" with Jonathan Leonard. Economic Policy, Vol. 17, October 1993, pp. 355–400. Reprinted in "Industrial Policy and Competitive Advantage," David B. Audretsch, ed., London: Edward Elgar. (1997)
- "Création et destruction d’emplois et chômage: Le cas belge" with Benoît Mulkay. Economie et Prévisions, Vol. 108, No. 2, April 1993, pp. 19–30.
- "Cost Observation, Auditing, and Limited Liability" with Jacques Lawarrée. Economics Letters, Vol. 39, August 1992, pp. 419–423.
- "Marché du travail et chômage: Diagnostic socio-économique du cas belge" Reflets et Perspectives de la Vie Economique, Vol. 35, No. 6, 1987.
- "Use of Economic Surveys in Forecasting" with M.A. Benito-Alonso et Benoit Hallet. Proceedings of International Conference on System Science and Engineering, Cheng Weimin, ed. International Academic Publishers, 1988.
- "Arbitration Models for Solving Multi Objective Optimization" with M.A. Benito-Alonso and F. Condis. Lecture Notes in Mathematical Economics, Vol. 285, 1987.
