= Louis-Nicolas-Emmanuel de Bigault d'Aubreville =

Louis-Nicolas-Emmanuel de Bigault d’Aubreville (fl. 1791–1828) was a French army officer and, subsequently, an office holder in Canada.

D’Aubreville fled France in 1791 during the French Revolution and became part of a French mercenary group. He was briefly in the Swiss army and then became part of the British cause in 1801. His army career brought him to Montreal in 1813, where he was quickly deployed to reinforce British regulars in their conduct of the war with the United States. He was also effectively employed as a recruiter during that period. At the end of the war he stayed on in Canada with his family.

D’Aubreville became the head of the night watch in Montreal in 1818. He had a controversial career there until 1827, when he was dismissed from that position and disappeared from historical records. His varied and commendable military career is well noted. His checkered civilian career seems to indicate an inability to adjust to civilian life.
