= Byron Sonne =

Byron Sonne is a Canadian security researcher who was wrongly accused of planning to bomb the Toronto G20 Summit in 2010. He was charged with possessing explosives and counseling mischief, later to be acquitted of all charges on May 15, 2012, putting an end to his two-year ordeal. Sonne was a self-proclaimed troubleshooter and was trying to find weaknesses and points of vulnerability in the G20 security systems when he was arrested. The incident created an outrage and started a debate regarding whether citizens have the right to goad their government and just how far one can push the boundaries of civil liberties.

He was arrested on June 22, 2010 and was charged with possession of explosives and dangerous weapons, intimidating justice officials and mischief. By the time the case got to trial, all counts were dropped except the four counts of explosives possession and one of "counseling mischief not committed." He remained behind bars for 11 months before finally being granted bail.

His wife at the time, Kristen Peterson, was arrested two days after him and charged with weapons and explosives offenses; she was let out on soon after, and charges against her were also dropped seven months later.
