= George Georgiou (professor) =

Canadian psychologist

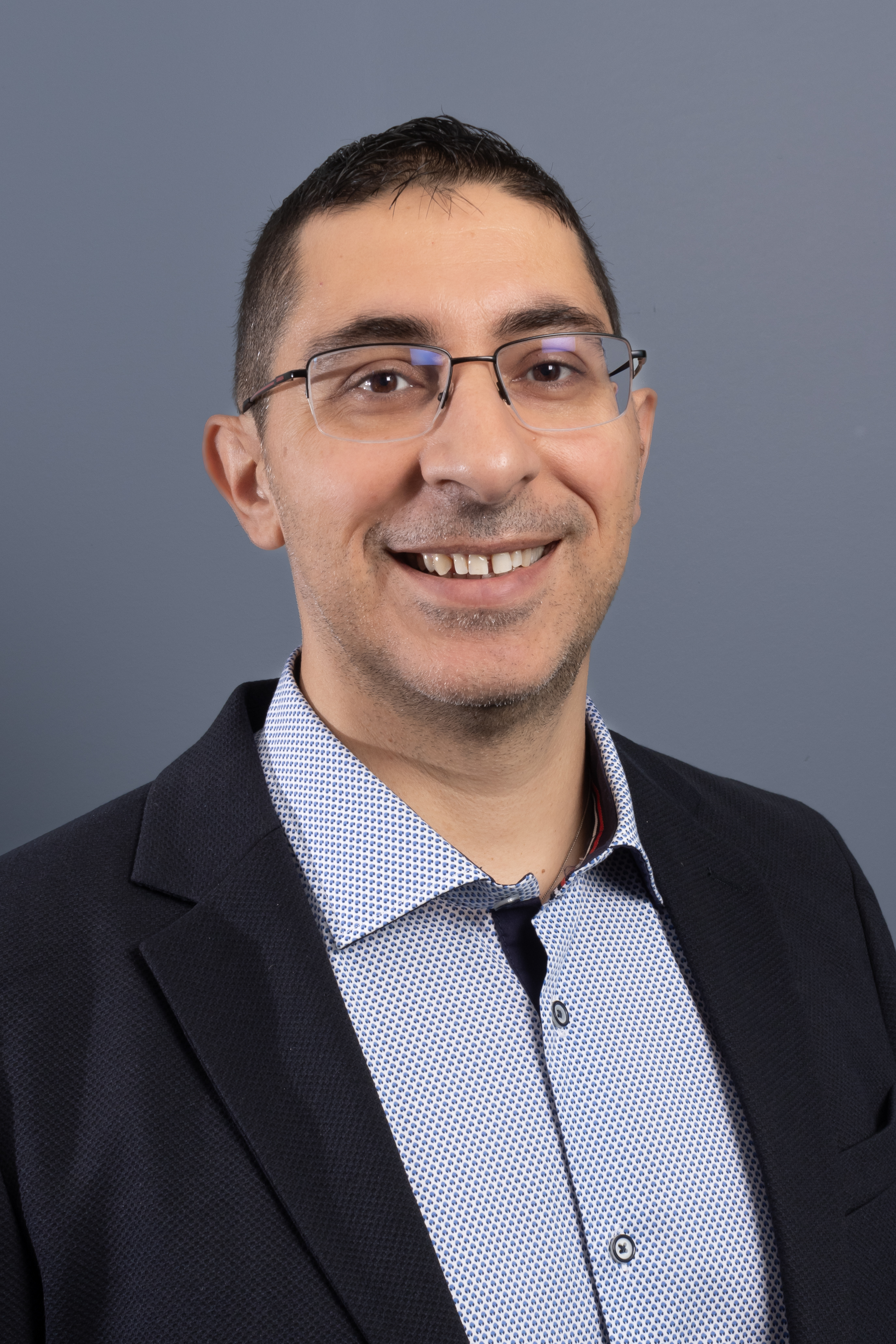
George Georgiou

George K. Georgiou is a Canadian educational psychologist who is a full professor in the Department of Educational Psychology at the University of Alberta. He also directs the J.P. Das Centre on Developmental and Learning Disabilities. His research primarily addresses the prevention and treatment of reading disabilities.

== Career ==
George started his career as an elementary school teacher in Cyprus before pursuing his graduate studies at the University of Alberta. As of 2008 he works as a professor in the Department of Educational Psychology at the University of Alberta. He is also the Director of the J.P. Das Centre on Developmental and Learning Disabilities. Finally, he is the associate editor for the journals Reading & Writing and The Reading League.

== Books ==
- The Phonics Companions (2022) ISBN 978-0137916207
- Better Together: Blending the Science of Reading and Professional Learning Communities at Work

== Honors ==
- 2024 Confederation of the Alberta Faculty Associations Distinguished Researcher Award
- 2022 Queen Elizabeth II Platinum Jubilee Medal
- 2020 Killam Professorship Award
- 2019 Alberta Teachers' Association Educational Research Award
- Inducted into the college of the Royal Society of Canada in 2018.
- 2015 Richard E. Snow Award from the American Psychological Association (Division 15)
- 2014 Martha Cook Piper Research Award from the University of Alberta
