= Meghan Athavale =

Canadian entrepreneur

- Other names: Meg Rabbit
- Occupations: Entrepreneur and toy designer
- Years active: 2009 - Current
- Known for: Interactive toy design; video mapping and projection;
- Website: megrabbit.com

Meghan Athavale, frequently known as Meg Rabbit, is an entrepreneur and visual artist known for her work with interactive toy design, video mapping and projections, and folk music. She is the co-founder and CEO of Po-motion, a maker of software for interactive projection installations, and the co-founder of Lumo Play, a toy that creates projected interactive environments for children which was developed as part of the Highway1 startup accelerator.

Athavale is the co-author of eight patents and patents pending in the field of mobile projection, augmented reality, and interactivity. These patents include:

- Content generation for interactive video projection systems
- Infrared reflective device - interactive projection effect system
- Interactive projection effect and entertainment system
- Content generation for interactive video projection systems
- Interactive video system

A self-taught musician, Athavale has recorded one album and toured throughout North America. She has represented Canadian technologists at the G20 Young Entrepreneur Summit and the SXSW festival. She has also created a number of interactive installations in museums and public spaces, and regularly performs video mapping and animation for public events and musical acts.
