= Thomasclarkite-(Y) =

Rare mineral

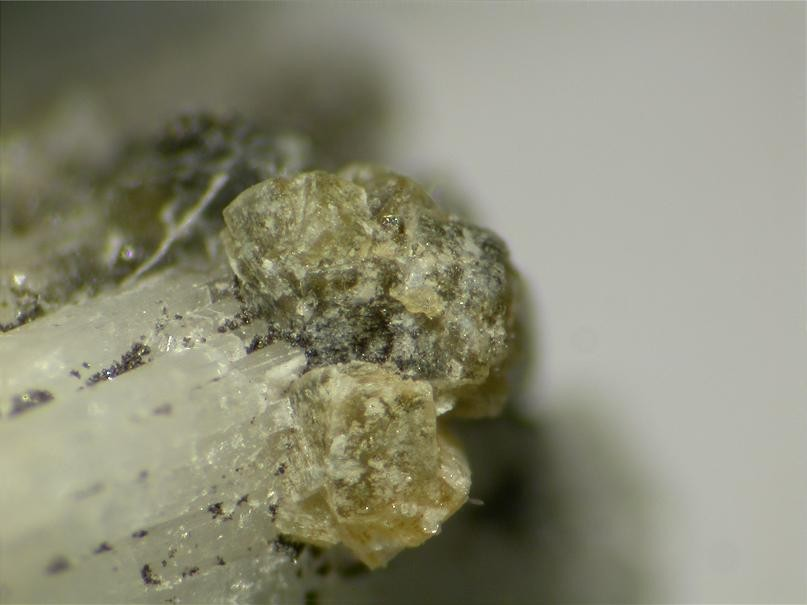

General
- Category: Carbonate mineral
- Formula: (Na, Ce)(Y, REE)(HCO_{3})(OH)_{3}·4(H_{2}O)
- IMA symbol: Tcl-Y
- Crystal system: Monoclinic
- Crystal class: Sphenoidal (2) (same H-M symbol)
- Space group: P2

Identification
- Formula mass: 375.77 g/mol
- Color: White, yellow
- Crystal habit: Blocky crystals, pseudo-tetragonal
- Twinning: Common on (101)
- Cleavage: [010] Perfect, [101] parting
- Fracture: Uneven
- Tenacity: Very brittle
- Mohs scale hardness: 2–3
- Luster: Vitreous (glassy)
- Streak: White
- Diaphaneity: Translucent to transparent
- Specific gravity: 2.30
- Optical properties: Pseudouniaxial negative 2V (meas.) ≤ 5°
- Refractive index: n_{α} = 1.40, n_{β} = 1.540, n_{γ} = 1.540
- Birefringence: δ = 0.140
- Other characteristics: Radioactive 770 Bq/g

Thomasclarkite-(Y) is a rare mineral which was known as UK-93 until 1997, when it was renamed in honour of Thomas H. Clark (1893–1996), McGill University professor. The mineral is one of many rare-earth element minerals from Mont Saint-Hilaire. The only reported occurrence is in an alkalic pegmatite dike in an intrusive gabbro-nepheline syenite.

== See also ==
- List of minerals
- List of minerals named after people
