= Stanley James Tippett =

Canadian criminal

Stanley James Tippett is a Canadian criminal who in 2011 was nominated by the Crown to be declared a dangerous offender, which resulted in Tippett being incarcerated indefinitely. The declaration was granted by the court, and Tippett will remain in prison for an indeterminate amount of time.

Tippett was convicted in December 2009 of seven criminal counts, including kidnapping and sexual assault. Tippett was convicted of kidnapping and sexually assaulting a 12-year-old girl he abducted from a Peterborough, Ontario street. At the time of his arrest, the police searching his van found duct tape, rope, a jackknife, shears, measuring tape, a hammer and long plastic ties.

Stanley Tippett is also the prime suspect in the 1999 death of 15-year-old Sharmini Anandavel, his neighbour when he lived in the North York district of Toronto, who had told her parents and close friends that she had taken a job with Tippett. Sharmini's younger brother also recalls Tippett offering her employment while in his presence.
