= Trevor James (YouTuber) =

Canadian-born food and travel vlogger and YouTuber

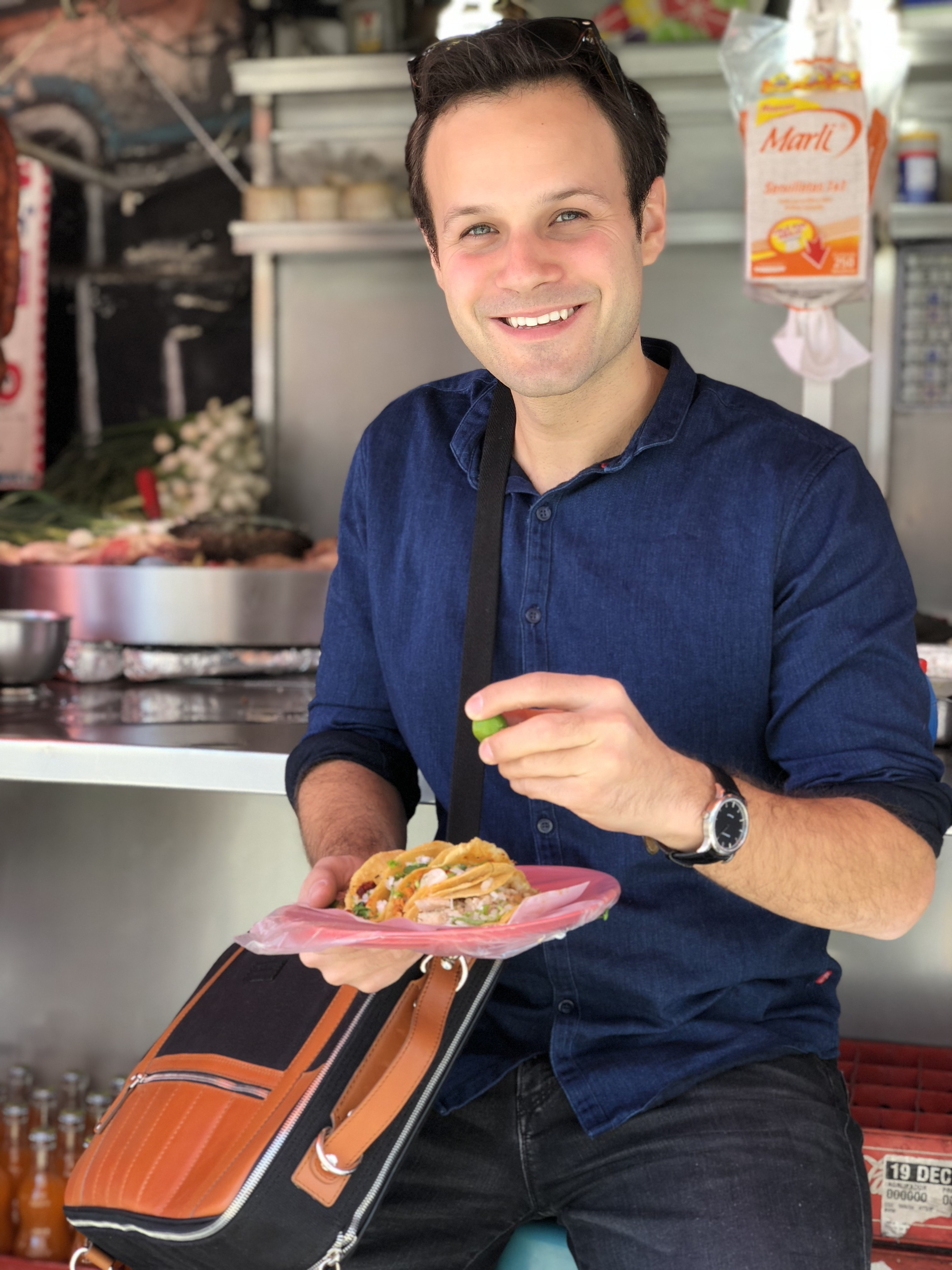
- James in December 2017
- Born: 1988 (age 37–38); Vancouver, British Columbia, Canada
- Occupations: YouTube personality; food and travel vlogger
- Years active: 2013–present

YouTube information
- Channel: The Food Ranger
- Genres: Food; travel
- Subscribers: 5.93 million
- Views: 921 million
- Last updated: October 21, 2025
- Website: thefoodranger.com travelsecurely.com

Trevor James, also known as "The Food Ranger" on YouTube, is a Canadian food and travel vlogger and YouTuber known for his street food tours on YouTube, which have been viewed over 649 million times. James started filming his food and travel videos in March 2013 and his channel has since grown to have over 5 million subscribers.

== Early life and education ==
Trevor James was born in Vancouver, British Columbia. When he was 13, he moved to Calgary, Alberta.

After graduating from high school, James took two gap years to travel. During the summer after graduation, he saved up $5,000 CAD working a summer job and spent 4 months in South East Asia. In his downtime, he would go snowboarding in Whistler, British Columbia, while during the summer he worked as a hiking and outdoor tour guide at a seasonal all-inclusive resort.

From 2008 to 2014, James attended the University of British Columbia (UBC) studying Forestry and Natural Resource Conservation, where he graduated with a BSc. In his sophomore year, he moved to China and by September 2014, he was living in Chengdu of the Sichuan province where his YouTube Channel, The Food Ranger, was born and heavily influenced. He resided in Kuala Lumpur, Malaysia from November 2019 until June 2021.

== Career ==
James began shooting his first YouTube videos in early 2013 while on a four-month trip from Singapore to Beijing. Since then, he has filmed food and travel videos in Pakistan, Malaysia, Bangladesh, India, Sri Lanka, Turkey, Uzbekistan, Vietnam, Indonesia, Thailand, Singapore, and Mexico. One of James' first Food Ranger episodes was shot at street hawker stalls in Setapak, Kuala Lumpur in June 2014. At that time, his channel had about 2,000 subscribers. Four years later, it had over 3.2 million subscribers.

When James first moved to China, he was pursuing a master's degree in Business and International Trade at the Southwestern University of Finance and Economics in Chengdu, China. In 2015, while traveling in Istanbul, Turkey, he met his soon to be fiancé, Ting Ting, who is now part of the Food Ranger production team.

In August 2016, James dropped out of his Master's program and enrolled in the Higher Institute of Cuisine at the Sichuan Tourism College, dropping out, after one term. He then decided to pursue YouTube full-time. Ting Ting also quit her job as an English teacher's assistant to help film and edit. In 2016, James offered free homestays to travelers as a member of CouchSurfing.

In October 2017, The Food Ranger reached 1 million subscribers. Some of James' most popular videos are his Street Food Tour videos in Mumbai and Old Delhi, India, alongside Pakistan and his Xi’an and Beijing videos. He gained YouTube popularity for tasting local street food and hole-in-the-wall food joints in communities across Asia. During his travels, he has eaten many unusual foods including live coconut worms, rabbit head, pink dolphin, rainbow lobster, camel platter, durian hot pot, bull penis soup, and Quail Egg Balut. In June 2017, The Food Ranger was listed in that's Shanghai magazine's "5 China-Based Youtubers You Need to Be Following".

As of February 2026, James' YouTube channel has 5.9 million subscribers.

== Personal life ==
James is married to Ting Ting. They first met while on vacation in Turkey in 2015.
