= David Oancia =

Canadian journalist (1929–1995)

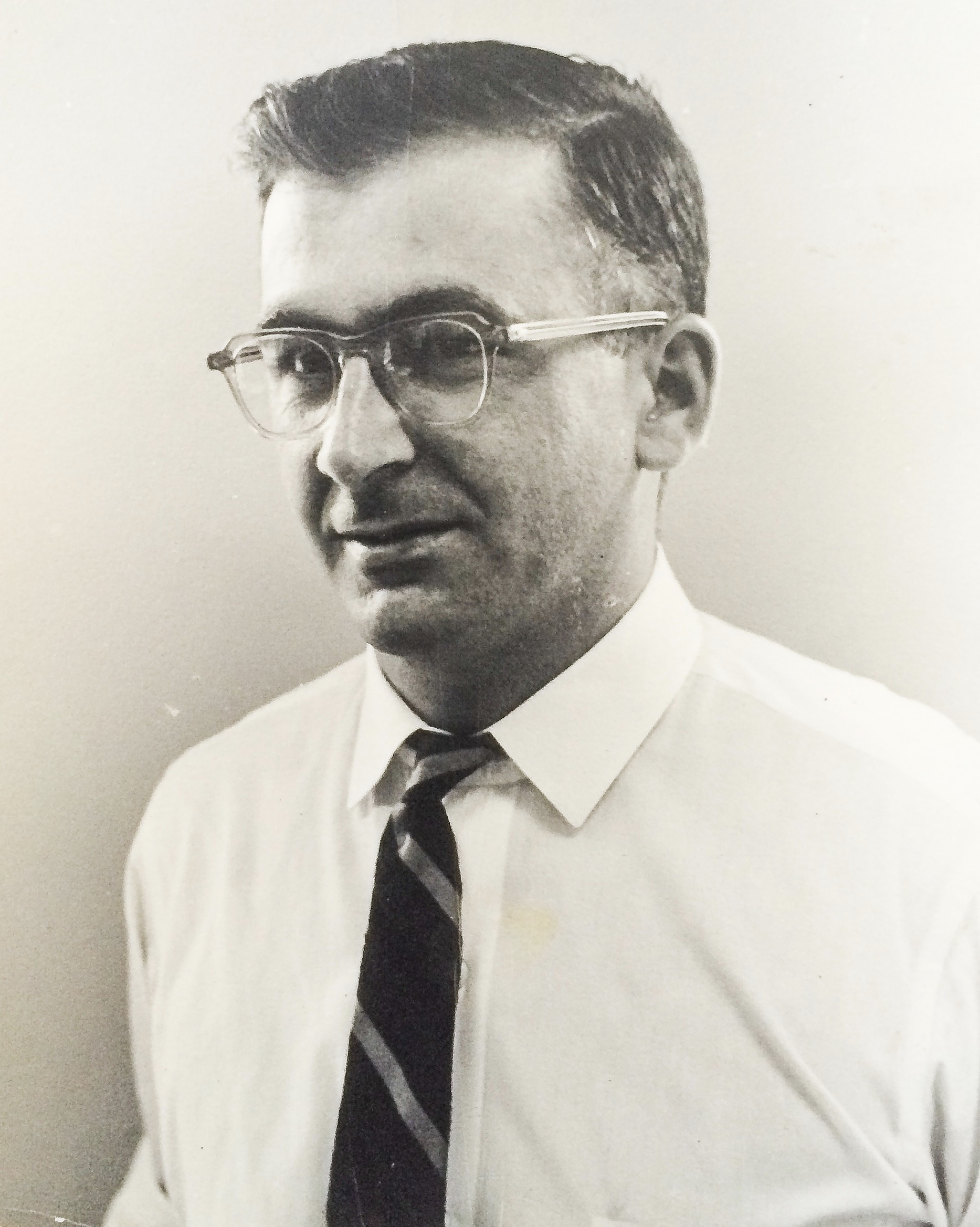
- Born: David Oancia; December 6, 1929; Stonehenge, Saskatchewan, Canada
- Died: January 18, 1995 (aged 65); Saint John, New Brunswick, Canada
- Occupation: Journalist
- Employer: The Globe and Mail
- Spouse: Maria Asuncion Prieto-Cereceda
- Children: Patrick Oancia, David Oancia

David Oancia (December 6, 1929 – January 18, 1995) was a Canadian journalist. He worked for several press, primarily The Globe and Mail. He is best known as the only resident non-communist North American correspondent in Beijing reporting on China’s cultural revolution during the late 1960s. His contributions have been cited in numerous books, academic journals, and other publishings.

== Life and career ==
David Oancia was born in Stonehenge, Saskatchewan on December 6, 1929, to Romanian immigrant parents. In his teenage years he worked in the Yukon in the fur trade. In 1952, he began work as a journalist at the Moose Jaw Times-Herald, and later worked at the Regina Leader-Post and the Canadian Press in Canada, Europe, North Africa, and the Middle East.

In 1963 he started working at The Globe and Mail, and in two years became the newspaper's correspondent in China where he was the last non-communist reporter. In 1967, he received the National Newspaper Awards for his coverage and journalistic excellence.

In 1971 he returned to Canada to work at the Montreal Star. In 1974 he became director of Journalism at the Sir George Williams College at Concordia University. In 1979 he was named director of CBC Television News in Halifax, Nova Scotia. In 1982 he was appointed director of Information for the University of New Brunswick, and in 1984 he became editor at the Saint John Telegraph-Journal and Evening Times-Globe. He died in Saint John, New Brunswick on January 18, 1995, at the age of 65.
