= Mary Clark (architect) =

Canadian architect

Mary Clark (born 1936) is a Canadian architect. She is also known as Mary Patterson Clark.

She was born in Toronto and, in 1959, received her BArch from the University of Toronto. In the same year, she married architect Clive Clark. Clark then worked for firms in North Bay and Toronto. From 1969 to 1972, she worked independently and then was a research coordinator for a land use study by James Weller. She worked on the development of urban transportation in Toronto during the 1970s. In 1973, she became a registered member of the Ontario Association of Architects. In 1984, she received a BSc in planning from the University of Toronto. During the 1980s and 1990s, she worked as an archival researcher for the project "For the Record: The First Women in Canadian Architecture". In 1988, she produced reports on women architecture graduates from Canadian universities and on registered Canadian women architects. In 1986, she began practising in Nunavut, Clark retired from practice in 2000.
