= Taryn Davidson =

Canadian model

- Born: February 2, 1991 (age 35); Ottawa, Ontario, Canada
- Modeling information
- Height: 6 ft 0 in (1.83 m)
- Hair color: Dark blonde
- Eye color: Blue/green

Taryn Davidson (born February 2, 1991) is a Canadian model.

== Early life ==
Davidson is the second eldest of four children, Talia, Lauren, and Sean, and lived her first few years in New Liskeard, before moving to Brooklin, Ontario.

== Career ==
In 2007, she signed with DNA Model Management and ahead of debut she was compared with the supermodels of the 1980s. In September 2007, she debuted at the Calvin Klein show in New York as an exclusive, and in the same month walked as an exclusive for Jil Sander in Milan, leading Models.com to feature Davidson as a "Top 10 Newcomer". Vmagazine.com added her as the third ranked model of Spring 2008.

In 2008, she became the face of "See by Chloé" for fall, replacing Karlie Kloss.
