= Charles Guillimin =

Canadian entrepreneur (1676–1739)

- Born: 1676
- Died: February 27, 1739; Quebec, New France, Kingdom of France
- Occupation(s): Shipbuilder, Merchant, Entrepreneur
- Spouse: Françoise Lemaître-Lamorille
- Children: 2
- Father: Guillaume Guillimin

Charles Guillimin (1676 – February 27, 1739) was a shipbuilder, merchant, and entrepreneur in New France. He was a member of the Guillimin noble family of Brittany, France.

Guillimin arrived in New France in the late 17th century with enough capital to pursue a number of enterprises, including ship building, outfitting of ships, and a variety of mercantile endeavours. He made investments in St. Lawrence fisheries and condcted trade with metropolitan merchants. He constructed, during his career between 7 and 8 seagoing vessels in Quebec. He developed fishing establishments in the Baie des Chaleurs and on the Îles de la Madeleine. He served as a commission agent for Madame Pascaud of La Rochelle. He was also responsible for the construction of large homes and at least one store in Quebec and Montreal. In 1712, he loaned the king's treasury 40,000 livres to avert a financial crisis.

Guillimin had numerous close ties within the Canadian business community both through marriage and business connections. He was awarded for his services on September 20, 1721 with an appointment to Conseil Supérieur of New France. He was singled out for praise by Governor Charles de Beauharnois and Intendant Gilles Hocquart. His fortune disappeared later in life.
