= Canadian government scientific research organizations =

List of Canadian government-funded research organizations

Expenditures by federal and provincial organizations on scientific research and development accounted for about 10% of all such spending in Canada in 2006. These organizations are active in natural and social science research, engineering research, industrial research and medical research.

Below is a list of Canadian Federal and Provincial Government scientific research organizations as of January 2008. In some cases the agency mentioned is dedicated exclusively to scientific research, a good example being the National Research Council Canada. In other cases the organization conducts scientific research within the framework of a much larger mandate, such as the transportation research undertaken by the Transportation Development Centre in Montreal which occurs as part on the general transportation regulatory function of Transport Canada. While most of the organizations mentioned here are "brick and mortar", some, such as the Canadian Institutes of Health Research, are "virtual" and consist of dedicated groups of researchers who are geographically dispersed but remain in close contact through electronic means.

Total funding for the organizations listed below amounted to about C$2.5 billion in 2006, or about 10% of all scientific research and development spending in Canada.

== Federal organizations ==
=== Devoted exclusively to scientific research ===
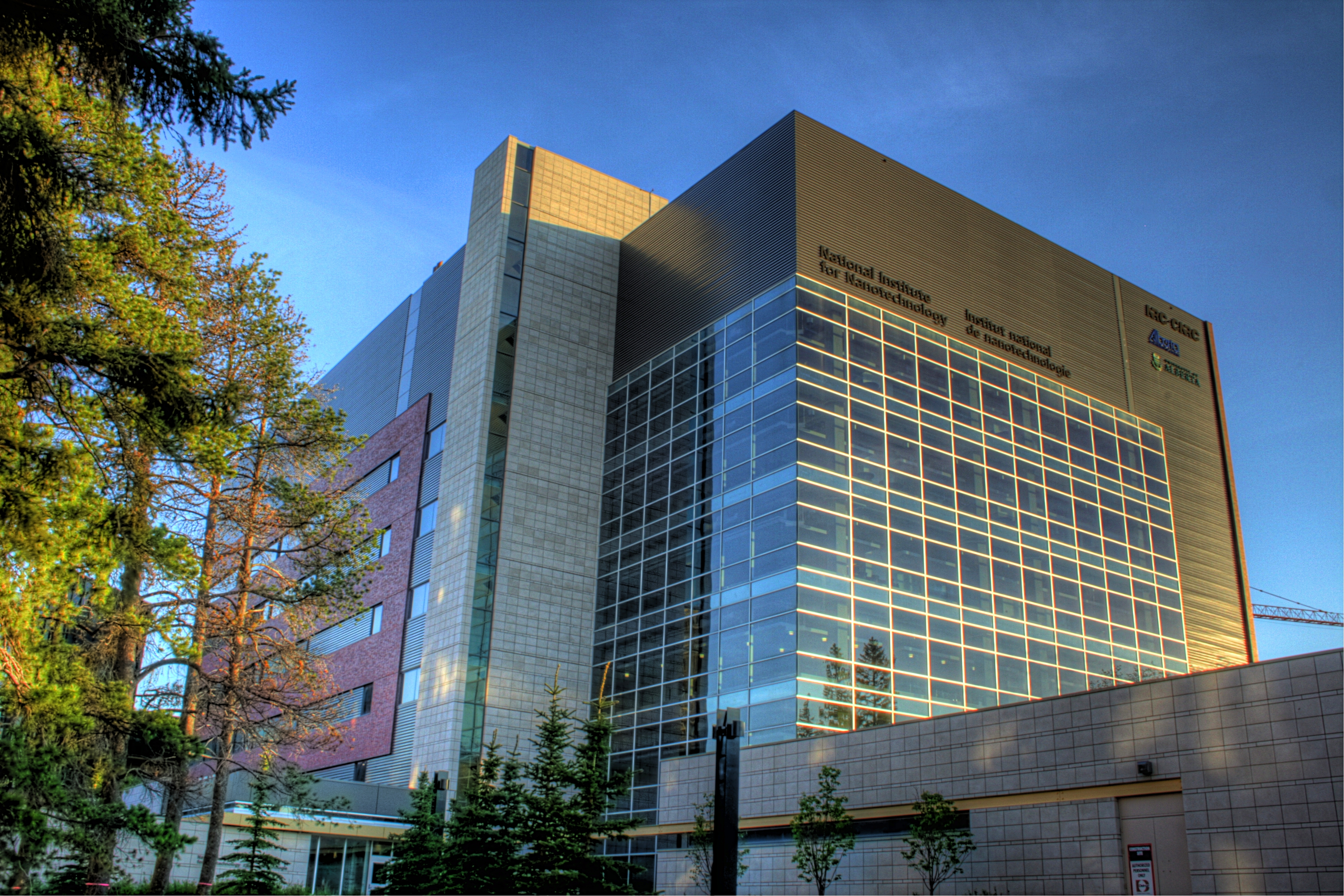
National Institute for Nanotechnology on the north campus of the University of Alberta

- Atomic Energy of Canada Limited - Ottawa, Ontario
  - Chalk River Laboratories - Chalk River, Ontario
  - Whiteshell Laboratories - Whiteshell, Manitoba
- _{Canadian Biodiversity Information Facility (virtual research institute)} [decommissioned]
- Canadian Institutes of Health Research - HQ Ottawa, Ontario
  - Institute of Aging
  - Institute of Cancer Research
  - Institute of Circulatory and Respiratory Health
  - Institute of Gender and Health
  - Institute of Genetics
  - Institute of Health Services and Policy Research
  - Institute of Human Development, Child and Youth Health
  - Institute of Indigenous Peoples' Health
  - Institute of Infection and Immunity
  - Institute of Musculoskeletal Health and Arthritis
  - Institute of Neurosciences, Mental Health and Addiction
  - Institute of Nutrition, Metabolism and Diabetes
  - Institute of Population and Public Health
- Canadian Space Agency - St. Hubert, Quebec
  - John H. Chapman Space Centre - St. Hubert, Quebec
  - David Florida Laboratory - Ottawa, Ontario
- Defence Research and Development Canada - HQ Ottawa, Ontario
  - Defence R&D Canada Suffield - Suffield, Alberta
  - Defence R&D Canada Toronto - Toronto, Ontario
  - Defence R&D Canada Ottawa - Ottawa, Ontario
  - Defence R&D Canada Centre for Security Science - Ottawa, Ontario
  - Defence R&D Canada Valcartier - Valcartier, Quebec
  - Defence R&D Canada Atlantic - Halifax, Nova Scotia
  - Defence R&D Canada Centre for Operational Research and Analysis - Ottawa, Ontario
- National Research Council of Canada - HQ Ottawa, Ontario
  - Scientific research
    - NRC Herzberg Institute of Astrophysics (NRC-HIA) - Penticton and Victoria, British Columbia
    - NRC Steacie Institute for Molecular Sciences (NRC-SIMS) - Ottawa (Sussex Drive) and Chalk River, Ontario
    - NRC Canadian Neutron Beam Centre (NRC-SIMS) - Chalk River, Ontario
    - NRC National Institute for Nanotechnology (NRC-NINT) - Edmonton, Alberta
    - NRC Nuclear Magnetic Resonance (NRC-NMR) - Ottawa (Montreal Road Campus), Ontario
    - NRC Institute for Biological Sciences (NRC-IBS) - Ottawa (Montreal Road Campus) and Ottawa (Sussex Drive), Ontario
    - NRC Biotechnology Research Institute (NRC-BRI)- Montreal, Quebec
    - NRC Institute for Biodiagnostics (NRC-IBD) - Winnipeg, Manitoba: Calgary, Alberta: Halifax, Nova Scotia
    - NRC Plant Biotechnology Institute (NRC-PBI) - Saskatoon, Saskatchewan
    - NRC Institute for Marine Biosciences (NRC-IMB) - Halifax, Nova Scotia
    - NRC Genomics and Health Initiative (NRC-GHI)
    - NRC Institute for Nutrisciences and Health (NRC-INH) - Charlottetown, Prince Edward Island
  - Engineering research
    - NRC Institute for Aerospace Research (NRC-IAR)- Ottawa (Montreal Road Campus), Ottawa (Uplands Campus), Ontario: Montreal, Quebec
    - NRC Centre for Surface Transportation Technology (NRC-CSTT) - Ottawa (Uplands Campus), Ontario
    - NRC Canadian Hydraulics Centre (NRC-CHC)- Ottawa (Montreal Road Campus), Ontario
    - NRC Institute for Ocean Technology (NRC-IOT) - St.John's, Newfoundland
    - NRC Institute for Microstructural Sciences (NRC-IMS)- Ottawa (Montreal Road Campus), Ontario
    - NRC Industrial Materials Institute (NRC-IMI) - Boucherville, Quebec: London, Ontario: Saguenay (Chicoutimi), Quebec
    - NRC Institute for Chemical Process and Environmental Technology (NRC-ICPET) - Ottawa (Montreal Road Campus), Ontario
    - NRC Institute for Fuel Cell Innovation (NRC-IFCI) - Vancouver, British Columbia
    - NRC Institute for Information Technology (NRC-IIT) - Ottawa (Montreal Road Campus), Ontario: Gatineau, Quebec: Fredericton, Moncton, Saint John, New Brunswick
    - NRC Construction Research Centre - Ottawa (Montreal Road Campus), Ontario: London, Ontario: Regina, Saskatchewan (Centre for Sustainable Infrastructure Research)
    - NRC Imaging Network (Ottawa—based)
  - Support institutes
    - NRC Canada Institute for Scientific and Technical Information (NRC-CISTI) - Ottawa (Montreal Road Campus)
    - NRC Industrial Research Assistance Program (NRC-IRAP)- Ottawa (Montreal Road Campus), Ontario and NRC-IRAP across Canada
    - NRC Institute for National Measurement Standards (NRC-INMS) - Ottawa (Montreal Road Campus), Ontario

=== Conducting scientific research in support of a larger mandate ===
- Agriculture and Agri-Food Canada - HQ, Ottawa, Ontario
  - Research organizations
    - Agassiz Research and Development Centre - Agassiz, British Columbia
    - Summerland Research and Development Centre - Summerland, British Columbia
    - Lacombe Research and Development Centre - Lacombe, Alberta
    - Lethbridge Research and Development Centre - Lethbridge, Alberta
    - Saskatoon Research and Development Centre - Saskatoon, Saskatchewan
    - Swift Current Research and Development Centre - Swift Current, Saskatchewan
    - Brandon Research and Development Centre - Brandon, Manitoba
    - Morden Research and Development Centre - Morden, Manitoba
    - London Research and Development Centre - London, Ontario
    - Ottawa Research and Development Centre - Ottawa, Ontario
    - Guelph Research and Development Centre - Guelph, Ontario
    - Harrow Research and Development Centre - Harrow, Ontario
    - Sherbrooke Research and Development Centre - Sherbrooke (Lennoxville Sector), Quebec
    - Saint-Hyacinthe Research and Development Centre - Saint-Hyacinthe, Quebec
    - Quebec Research and Development Centre - Quebec, Quebec
    - Saint-Jean-sur-Richelieu Research and Development Centre - Saint-Jean-sur-Richelieu, Quebec
    - Fredericton Research and Development Centre - Fredericton, New Brunswick
    - Charlottetown Research and Development Centre - Charlottetown, Prince Edward Island
    - Kentville Research and Development Centre - Kentville, Nova Scotia
    - St John's Research and Development Centre - St. John's, Newfoundland and Labrador
- Canadian Food Inspection Agency - Ottawa, Ontario
  - National Centre For Animal Disease
  - Area Laboratories Network - Atlantic
  - Area Laboratories Network - Quebec
  - Area Laboratories Network - Ontario
  - Area Laboratories Network - Western
- Canadian Grain Commission - Winnipeg, Manitoba
  - Grain Research Laboratory
- Canadian Polar Commission - Ottawa, Ontario
- Communications Security Establishment - Ottawa, Ontario
  - Cryptological research for Canadian government foreign signals intelligence gathering
    - Canadian Forces Base Leitrim - Leitrim, Ontario
    - Canadian Forces Base Masset - Masset, British Columbia
    - Canadian Forces Base Alert - Alert, Nunavut
- Environment Canada - HQ, Gatineau, Quebec
  - Canadian Ice Service
  - Canadian Wildlife Service
  - Meteorological Service of Canada
- Fisheries and Oceans Canada - HQ, Ottawa, Ontario
  - Canadian Hydrographic Service
  - Research institutes
    - Institute of Ocean Sciences - Sidney, British Columbia
    - Pacific Biological Station
      - West Vancouver Laboratory
    - Cultus Lake Salmon Research Laboratory - Cultus Lake, British Columbia
    - Bayfield Institute -Burlington, Ontario
    - Sea Lamprey Control Centre - Sault Ste. Marie, Ontario
    - Freshwater Institute Science Laboratory - Winnipeg, Manitoba
    - Experimental Lakes Area - Kenora, Ontario
    - Saqvaqjuac research camp - Kivalliq Region, Nunavut
    - Resolute Bay Laboratories - Resolute Bay, Northwest Territories
    - The Maurice Lamontagne Institute - Pointe aux Cenelles, Quebec
    - St. Andrews Biological Station - St. Andrews, New Brunswick
    - Bedford Institute of Oceanography - Dartmouth, Nova Scotia
    - Otolith Research Laboratory
    - Canadian Shark Research Laboratory
    - Mactaquac Fish Culture Station - Mactaquac, New Brunswick
- Health Canada - Ottawa, Ontario
  - Research institutes:
    - Canadian Institutes of Health Research - Ottawa, Ontario
- Industry Canada - HQ, Ottawa, Ontario
  - Communications Research Centre Canada - Ottawa, Ontario
- International Development Research Centre - Ottawa, Ontario
- Natural Resources Canada - HQ, Ottawa, Ontario
  - Canadian Forest Service
    - Research institutes
      - Pacific Forestry Centre - Victoria, British Columbia
      - Northern Forestry Centre - Edmonton, Alberta
      - Great Lakes Forestry Centre - Sault Ste. Marie, Ontario
      - Laurentien Forestry Centre - Quebec, Quebec
      - Atlantic Forestry Centre - Fredericton, New Brunswick
  - Geological Survey of Canada - Ottawa, Ontario
  - Geomatics Canada - Ottawa, Ontario
  - Polar Continental Shelf Project, Ottawa, Ontario
  - CANMET Energy Technology Centre - Ottawa, Ontario
    - CANMET Energy Technology Centre - Devon, Alberta
    - CANMET Energy Technology Centre - Varennes, Quebec
  - CANMET Materials Technology Laboratory - Hamilton, Ontario
- Public Health Agency of Canada - HQ, Ottawa, Ontario
  - Centre for Chronic Disease Prevention and Control - Ottawa, Ontario
  - Centre for Infectious Disease Prevention and Control - Ottawa, Ontario
  - Laboratory for Foodborne Zoonoses - Guelph, Ontario
  - National Microbiology Laboratory - Winnipeg, Manitoba
  - Centre for Health Promotion - Ottawa, Ontario
- Royal Canadian Mounted Police - HQ, Ottawa, Ontario
  - Human Resources Assessment and Research - Ottawa, Ontario
  - Forensic Science and Identification Services - Ottawa, Ontario
- Statistics Canada - Ottawa, Ontario
- Transport Canada - HQ, Ottawa, Ontario
  - Transportation Development Centre - Montreal, Quebec

== Provincial organizations ==
Alberta

- InnoTech Alberta (formerly Alberta Research Council)
  - Advanced Materials Laboratories
  - Analytical Chemistry Laboratory
  - Fuels and Lubricants Laboratory
  - Plant Genetic Engineering Laboratory
  - Waste Materials Engineering Laboratory
  - Papermaking Laboratory
- Telecommunications Research Laboratories - Research Areas
  - TRLabs

British Columbia

- BCIT Technology Centre - Vancouver, British Columbia

Manitoba

- Food Development Centre
- Internet Innovation Centre

Newfoundland and Labrador

- Atlantic Cool Climate Crop Research Centre
- Centre for Cold-Ocean Research Engineering
- Geological Survey of Newfoundland and Labrador, St. John's, Newfoundland
- Northwest Atlantic Fisheries Centre

New Brunswick

- Research and Productivity Council - Fredericton, New Brunswick

Nova Scotia

- Research Nova Scotia - Halifax, Nova Scotia

Ontario

- Ontario Ministry of Research and Innovation - Toronto, Ontario
  - Research organizations
    - Ontario Centres of Excellence
      - Centre of Excellence for Communications and Information Technology
      - Centre of Excellence for Earth and Environmental Technologies
      - Centre of Excellence for Energy
      - Centre of Excellence for Materials and Manufacturing
      - Centre of Excellence for Photonics
    - Ontario Institute for Cancer Research
    - Regional Innovation Network Program
  - Commercialization and funding organizations
    - Early Researcher Awards
    - The Health Technology Exchange
    - Innovation Demonstration Fund
    - International Strategic Opportunities Program
    - Ontario Commercialization Investment Funds
    - Ontario Fuel Cell Innovation Programme
    - Ontario Research Commercialization Program
    - Premiers Discovery Awards

Prince Edward Island

- Atlantic Technology Centre
- Food Technology Centre
- Prince Edward Island Analytical Laboratories

Quebec

- L'institut nationale de recherche scientifique (INRS) - Quebec, Quebec
  - INRS Eau, Terre et Environnement
  - INRS Energie, Materiaux et Telecommunications
  - INRS Institut - Armand-Frappier
  - INRS Urbanisation, Culture et Societe
- Centre de recherche informatique de Montréal

Saskatchewan

- Saskatchewan Research Council
  - 3D Virtual reality Centre
  - SRC Analytical Laboratories
  - Biofuels Test Centre
  - Bova-Can Laboratories
  - Fermentation Pilot Plant
  - GenServe Laboratories
  - Geoanalytical Laboratories
  - Petroleum Analytical Laboratories
  - Pipe Flow Technology Centre
  - Transformer OilTesting Laboratory
- Saskatoon Research Centre - Saskatoon, Saskatchewan

Northwest Territories

- Aurora Research Institute - Inuvik, Northwest Territories

Nunavut

- Nunavut Research Institute
  - Igloolik Research Centre
  - Iqaliut Research Centre

== Expenditures on scientific research and development by sector ==
Canadian gross expenditure on R&D (GERD) by performing sectors - 2006 estimates in C$ millions

- Business enterprises: 14,850, 52.4%
- Higher education : 10,890, 38.4%
- Federal Government 2,145, 7.6%
- Provincial Government 345, 1.2%
- Provincial research organizations 127, 0.4%
- Total: 28,357, 100.0%

== See also ==
- Canadian university scientific research organizations
- Canadian industrial research and development organizations
- Science and technology in Canada
- Royal Society of Canada
