= Sylvie Cloutier =

Canadian scientist

Sylvie Cloutier is a Canadian scientist. She is a specialist in molecular genetics at Agriculture and Agri-Food Canada's Ottawa Research and Development Centre and an adjunct professor at the University of Ottawa. She has co-led two Genome Canada Large Scale Applied Research projects of $11M each and has been involved in over 110 published research papers and made contributions to many books.

== Early life and education ==
Cloutier was born and raised near Quebec City. She attended Laval University to complete her undergraduate degree. She completed a Master of Science in Biotechnology at the University of Guelph, and her PhD at the University of Montreal, studying molecular genetics.

== Career ==
Cloutier worked for the Canadian Food Inspection Agency (CFIA) in 1987 to inspect fields of certified seeds. She spent a brief time as a lecturer at the University of Montreal teaching a class on tissue culture in 1992. She also taught a graduate course on molecular genomics at the University of Manitoba in 2004. Cloutier is currently an adjunct professor for the University of Ottawa.

Cloutier began her Career at Agriculture and Agri-Food Canada (AAFC) in Winnipeg in 1996. Her research focused primarily on flax and wheat. In 2014 she was given the opportunity to join AAFC’s Eastern Cereal and Oilseed Research Centre (ECORC) in Ottawa after the closing of the Cereal Research Center in Winnipeg. With this change, her research focus shifted to wheat pre-breeding in particular rust diseases, the wheat midge insect, and continuing her work on epigenetics. In her career, Sylvie has been involved in over 110 published research papers and has contributed to numerous books.

Some of her current projects include the construction of physical maps of important seed quality traits, identification of wheat disease resistance genes, map-based cloning and sequencing of the wheat leaf rust resistance gene Lr1, and molecular genetics of the leaf rust pathosystem through gene expression profiling using microarrays. She currently co-leads the Genome Canada project “4DWheat: Diversity, Domestication, Discovery and Delivery” which aims to harness the genetic diversity from wild relatives through de novo sequencing of Aegilops species, annotation, transcriptomics, comparative analysis and high-throughput phenotyping. 4DWheat will apply the latest genomic strategies and focus on two major challenges: enhancing yield and managing producer risk to important diseases. Wheat is the most important crop for global food security, so meeting the challenge of increasing wheat production to match the growing demand is of high importance.

== Honours and awards ==
- Rosemary Davis award by Farm Credit Canada in recognition of her leadership in Agriculture (March 2013)
