= Hosahalli Ramaswamy =

Indian-Canadian food scientist (born 1950)

Hosahalli S. Ramaswamy
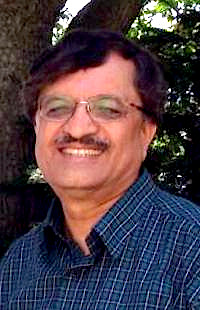
- Ramaswamy in 2014
- Born: 13 November 1950 (age 75); Bengaluru, India
- Other name: Swamy
- Education: University of British Columbia; Central Food Technological Research Institute
- Known for: Food processing; Thermal processing; High pressure processing;
- Awards: Hind Rattan Award; Pride of Canada; Marvin Tung Award; ICEF-12 Life Time Achievement Award
- Scientific career
- Fields: Food processing
- Workplaces: McGill University
- Doctoral advisor: Marvin A. Tung, University of British Columbia
- Doctoral students: Michèle Marcotte

Hosahalli S. Ramaswamy (born 13 November 1950), also popularly known as Swamy, is a Canadian food scientist of Indian origin, Professor of Food Science at McGill University in Montreal, Quebec, Canada and a visiting professor at Zhejiang University, China and Addis Ababa University, Ethiopia. Currently, he is the President of Canadian Institute of Food Science and Technology. He is also the editor of the Journal of Food Engineering.

== Biography ==
Ramaswamy was born in Hosahalli, India. He completed his bachelor's degree from Bangalore University in 1970. In 1972, he completed his M.Sc. in Food Technology from Central Food Technological Research Institute, Mysore, Karnataka, India. In 1978, he moved to Canada and took a M.Sc. & Ph.D. from University of British Columbia in 1979 and 1983 respectively. He joined McGill University as an assistant professor in 1987, was promoted to associate professor in 1992 and then full professor in 2002.

Supported by funding from Canada Foundation for Innovation, he has established a first-of-its-kind high pressure technology pilot plant facility on Macdonald Campus of McGill University.

== Professional work ==
Ramaswamy's early research led to the demonstration that heat transfer distribution, not temperature, is a performance indicator of overpressure cookers. He has been active in developing guidelines for heat penetration testing for process validation in food processing industries. His current research includes the evaluation of storage stability of packaged nuts, dried fruits, seeds and mixes through moisture sorption & stability isotherms, and accelerated storage tests, and the application of pulsed ultra-violet light treatment for decontamination and quality protection of frozen repackaged fruits

He is author of the textbook Food Processing - Principles and Applications, published in 2009 and now being used as a textbook in many food science departments at universities in North America. He is the editor of several books, and has published 400 peer-reviewed scientific papers, His work has been cited over 6000 times, with his H-index being 34.

== Awards and honors ==
- 1999 W.J. Eva Award by the Canadian Institute of Food Science and Technology
- 2002 John Clark Award of Canadian Society of Agricultural Engineering, Fellow of the Association of Food Scientists and Technologists (India)
- 2007 President's Award of Canadian Institute of Food Science and Technology
- 2014 Marvin A. Tung Achievement Award of Institute for Thermal Processing Specialists
- 2014 Hind Rattan (translated to English as "Jewel of India") award by Government of India.
- 2015 Life Time Achievement Award of International Association of Engineering and Food.
