= Deena Errampalli =

Canadian plant pathologist

- Education: Banaras Hindu University; Oklahoma State University
- Occupation: agricultural scientist
- Scientific career
- Fields: Plant pathology
- Workplaces: Agriculture and Agri-Food Canada

Deena Errampalli is a Canadian plant pathologist who is internationally known for her work on postharvest pathology of temperate tree fruits. She has conducted research in India, the USA and Canada and her work has resulted in new and innovative disease management strategies to improve plant health through Integrated Pest Management. Errampalli was a researcher at Agriculture and Agri-Food Canada Vineland, a satellite station of the London Research and Development Centre (2000-2018) Errampalli was also the Test-Site-Manager for Agriculture and Agri-Food Canada Minor Use Pesticide Program at Vineland Station where she managed trials for insect pests, diseases and weed control on minor use crops. She is also an award-winning fine-art painter, printmaker, and photographer whose work has been displayed in Canada, Italy, Poland, South Africa, USA, and India.

== Early life and education ==
Errampalli was born in 1958 in South India. Her mother, Mary Bharathi Kondaveti was a high school teacher, and her father, Stephen Devadatham Errampalli was an agronomist and later an assistant director of agriculture in Andhra Pradesh.

Errampalli earned her B.Sc. degree in botany at Andhra University, India; her M.Sc. (Agriculture) in mycology and plant pathology from the Institute of Agricultural Sciences at the Banaras Hindu University, Varanasi, India; and her Ph.D. in plant pathology from the Department of Entomology and Plant Pathology at Oklahoma State University, Stillwater, OK, USA. Her Ph.D. thesis (1990) title was Characterization of Aster Yellows in Oklahoma.

== Career ==
In the 1980s, she worked on the development of viral disease resistant germplasm of pulses (pigeonpea and chickpea) at the International Crops Research Institute for the Semi-Arid Tropics in Patancheru, India.

After moving to Canada in 1992, she completed two post doctoral positions, first one at the University of Toronto Mississauga and the second at the School of Environmental Sciences, University of Guelph.

She joined Agriculture and Agri-Food Canada as a research scientist in 1998 at the Charlottetown Research and Development Centre, Prince Edward Island, and conducted research on soil borne diseases of potatoes. In 2000 she moved to their London Research and Development Centre at Vineland, Ontario, Canada and has conducted research on pathology of tree fruits and vegetables, with a focus on postharvest pathology of tree fruits until 2018. The goal of her research was to develop integrated pest management strategies for postharvest temperate tree fruits, grape, and potato diseases with cultural, biological and/or chemical control methods in Canada.

Errampalli’s research projects at Agriculture and Agri-Food Canada were development of management strategies for replant disease in ginseng production in Ontario; new biological control products for postharvest diseases of pome fruit; Development of organic control strategies for apple scab; and Management of black knot in plums.

In 2006, Errampalli was appointed as the test site manager for the Agriculture and Agri-Food Canada Minor Use Pesticides Program, Vineland site. The program conducts field research and creates residue and /or efficacy data on tree fruits, small fruit and vegetable crops to support the regulatory registration submissions for fungicides, insecticides and herbicides.

She has published 35 refereed journal publications, 6 book chapters, over 200 Pest Management Research Reports, 60 confidential reports and 15 articles in popular grower magazines and newsletters and has made over 200 presentations at regional, national and international scientific conferences.

== Artistic interests ==
Errampalli is an avid gardener, in 2004 and 2005 her and her husband's landscaping garnered Burlington Civic Rose awards. They received Grimsby Trillium awards for best gardens in 2015-2018, 2021-2023, and 2024-2025. In 2025, they won Grimsby Garden of the Week Award. She is also an active birder.

In 2003 Errampalli enrolled in fine art classes at the Burlington Art Centre and now creates watercolour, oil and acrylic fine art paintings. Her love of gardening and nature is reflected in her artwork.

Her work has been exhibited in art galleries and in 27 juried, solo and group art shows since 2007. Her art work was selected for juried shows and some of her paintings won best in the show and honourable mention awards. Solo art shows featuring Errampalli’s work include the Art Gallery of Burlington (May 2010, February 2016, January 2020), and the Joseph Brant Memorial Hospital (October, 2010).

She is a member of the Art Gallery of Ontario, Art Gallery of Burlington, the Burlington Fine Arts Association, Grimsby Public Art Gallery and Lakeside Pumphouse Artist's Association in Grimsby. Her art work has been displayed in Canada, South Africa, Poland, Italy, USA, and India.

== Honours and awards ==
- President of the Canadian Phytopathological Society (2014-2015).
- Guest of Honour at the 11th European Foundation for Plant Pathology conference in Kraków, Poland (2014)
- President of the Plant Canada Federation of Canadian Plant Science Societies (2015-2019), an umbrella organization for Canadian plant science societies. Plant Canada is a founding member of the Global Plant Council.
- Treasurer of the Global Plant Council (2016–present).
- Section Editor of the Canadian Journal of Plant Pathology (2007-2018).
- Adjunct Professor, School of Environmental Sciences, University of Guelph.
- Associate Graduate Faculty, School of Environmental Sciences, University of Guelph.

== Selected publications ==
- Errampalli D. Penicillium expansum (blue mold). In: Bautista-Baños S, editor. Postharvest Decay: Control Strategies. Elsevier; 2014. pp. 189–231.
- Errampalli D, Wainman LI, DeEll JR. Reduced risk control options for apple postharvest diseases in long-term storages. Acta Horticulturae 2012;934:313–8.
- El-Kereamy A, El-Sharkawy I, Ramamoorthy R, Taheri A, Errampalli D, Kunar P, Jayasankar S. Prunus domestica pathogenesis-related protein-5 activates the defense response pathway and enhances the resistance to fungal infection. PLoS One 2011;6(3):e17973
- El-Kereamy A, Jayasankar S, Taheri A, Errampalli D, Paliyath G. Expression analysis of a plum Pathogenesis Related 10 (PR10) protein during brown rot infection. Plant Cell Reports 2009;27:28:95–102.
- Errampalli D, Saunders JM, Holley JD. Emergence of silver scurf (Helminthosporium solani) as an economically important disease of potato. Plant Pathology 2001; 50:141-153
- Errampalli D, Patton D, Castle L, Mickelson L, Hansen K, Schnall J, Feldmann K, Meinke D. Embryonic lethals and T-DNA insertional mutagenesis in Arabidopsis. The Plant Cell 1991; 3:149-157
