= Agriculture and Agri-Food Canada =

Canadian government department

- Agriculture et Agroalimentaire Canada

Department overview
- Formed: 1868; 158 years ago
- Jurisdiction: Government of Canada
- Headquarters: Ottawa, Ontario, Canada
- Minister responsible: Heath MacDonald, Minister of Agriculture and Agri-Food
- Deputy Minister responsible: Lawrence Hanson
- Child agencies: Canadian Dairy Commission; Canadian Grain Commission; Farm Credit Canada; National Farm Products Council
- Website: agriculture.canada.ca

Agriculture and Agri-Food Canada (AAFC; sometimes Ag-Canada; French: Agriculture et Agroalimentaire Canada) (Note: Agriculture and Agri-Food Canada is the applied title under the Federal Identity Program; the legal title is the Department of Agriculture and Agri-Food (French: Ministère de l’Agriculture et de l’Agroalimentaire).) is the department of the Government of Canada responsible for the federal regulation of agriculture, including policies governing the production, processing, and marketing of all farm, food, and agri-based products. Agriculture in Canada is a shared jurisdiction and the department works with the provinces and territories in the development and delivery of policies and programs.

The minister of agriculture and agri-food is responsible for the department to Parliament. While the minister is head of the department, and provides policy/political direction, the day-to-day operations of the department are managed by the deputy minister, who is a public servant.

== History ==
The Department of Agriculture for Canada was formed in 1867. It was organized under the Department of Agriculture Act, which was passed by Parliament and given royal assent on 22 May 1868.

The first minister of agriculture, Jean-Charles Chapais, and his deputy, Dr. Joseph Charles Taché, were soon presenting important bills to the House of Commons for the protection and improvement of Canadian agriculture. One of the first bills was an Act Respecting Contagious Diseases of Animals, passed in 1869. This law gave the chief veterinary inspector, Dr. Duncan McEachran, who was also the dean of medicine at McGill University, authority to prevent the introduction of animal diseases into Canada.

=== Other responsibilities ===
In addition to agriculture, the minister and the department had many other wide-ranging national responsibilities including immigration, public health, censuses and statistics, patents, copyrights, and trademarks. Over time, these other responsibilities were transferred to other departments. For example, the collection of statistics was transferred to the Dominion Bureau of Statistics (now Statistics Canada) in 1918, and healthcare in Canada was transferred to the Department of Health when it was created in 1919.

== Portfolio organizations ==
Today, organizations for which the minister of agriculture and agri-food is responsible for include:

- Canada Agricultural Review Tribunal
- Canadian Dairy Commission
- Canadian Grain Commission
- Farm Credit Canada
- Farm Products Council of Canada
- Canadian Pari-Mutuel Agency

In 2013, the Canadian Food Inspection Agency was moved from the Agriculture Portfolio to the Health Portfolio.

== Legislation ==
Agriculture and Agri-Food Canada is responsible for a number of laws related to agriculture and food in Canada.

- Agricultural Marketing Programs Act
- Agricultural Products Marketing Act
- Animal Pedigree Act
- Canada Grain Act
- Canadian Agricultural Loans Act
- Canadian Dairy Commission Act
- Canada Grain Act
- Department of Agriculture and Agri-Food Act
- Experimental Farm Stations Act
- Farm Debt Mediation Act
- Farm Credit Canada Act
- Farm Income Protection Act
- Farm Products Agencies Act
- Prairie Farm Rehabilitation Act

== Research ==
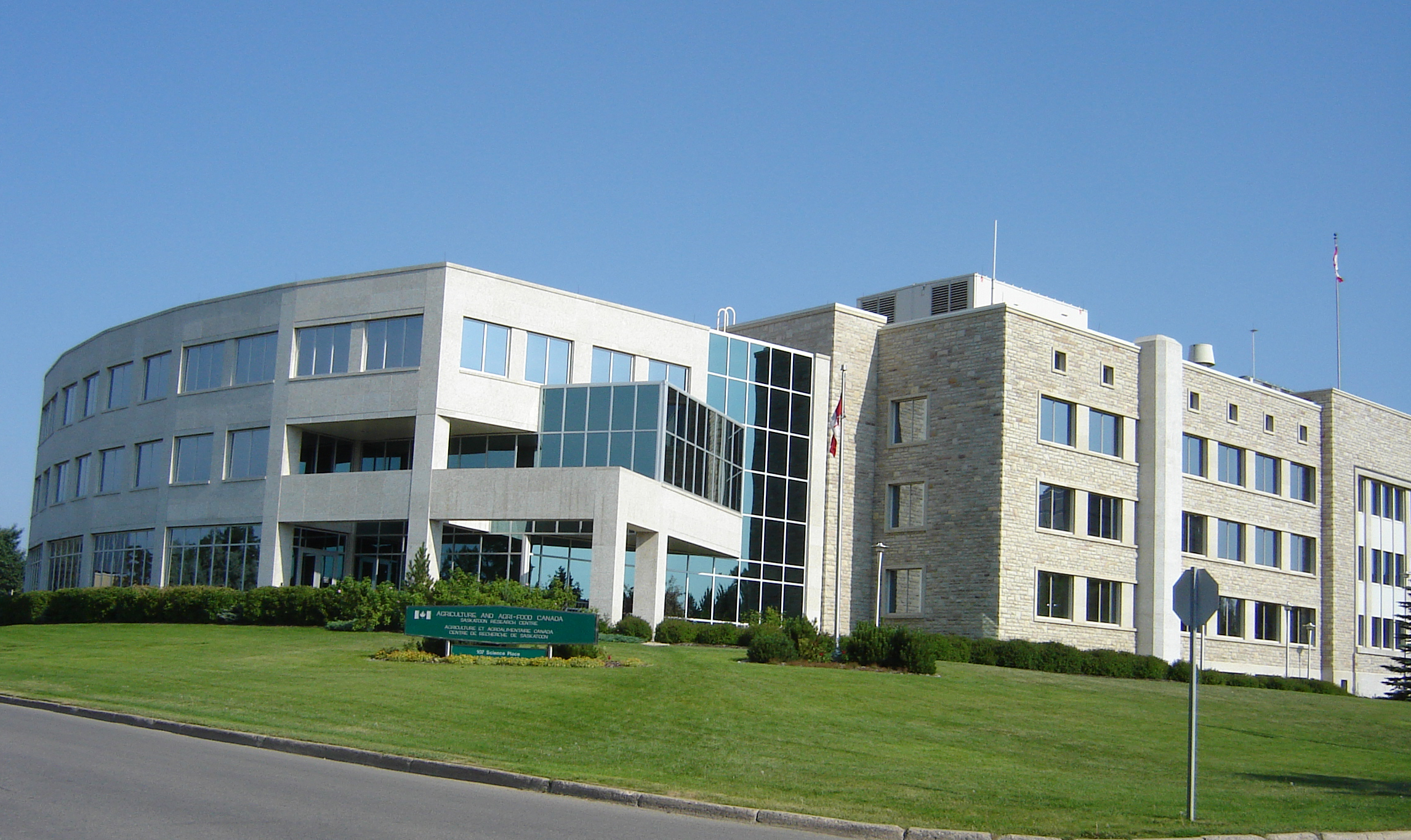
Agriculture and Agri-Food Canada Saskatoon Research and Development Centre on the Campus of the University of Saskatchewan

As part of Agriculture and Agri-Food Canada, the Science and Technology Branch (French: Direction générale des sciences et de la technologies) has the mandate to propose solutions and opportunities based on science to support competitiveness and the sustainability of the agriculture and agri-food sector. It is also in the Branch's mandate to provide scientific information to inform departmental and governmental decision processes.

Under the Experimental Farm Stations Act dating back to 1886, farm stations across Canada were established, including the Central Experimental Farm. The officers of these stations had the duty of conducting research in a number of specific areas pertinent to agricultural productivity and conservation, and of making the results of such research known by publication.

Today, the Science and Technology Branch includes a national network of 20 Research and Development Centres and 30 satellite research locations. The Science and Technology Branch has approximately 2,200 employees, including some 400 research scientists.

== Agriculture and agri-food research centres ==
Centres	Province	Speciality	Additional info
Agassiz Research and Development Centre Summerland Research and Development Centre	British Columbia	dairy systems, forage tree fruit, viticulture	
Lacombe Research and Development Centre Lethbridge Research and Development Centre	Alberta	beef cattle, forage irrigation, soil conservation	
Saskatoon Research and Development Centre Swift Current Research and Development Centre	Saskatchewan	cereals, genomics dryland farming, wheat	
Brandon Research and Development Centre Morden Research and Development Centre	Manitoba	crop systems, pest management pulse crops, soybeans	
Guelph Research and Development Centre Harrow Research and Development Centre London Research and Development Centre Pest Management Centre Ottawa Research and Development Centre	Ontario	food safety, genomics horticulture, greenhouse genomics, bioproducts soil health, water quality genomics, bioproducts	
Quebec Research and Development Centre Saint-Hyacinthe Research and Development Centre Saint-Jean-sur-Richelieu Research and Development Centre Sherbrooke Research and Development Centre	Quebec	soil management, agro-environment food processing, dairy vegetable crops, integrated pest management dairy production, animal welfare	
Fredericton Research and Development Centre	New Brunswick	potatoes, crop protection	
Charlottetown Research and Development Centre	Prince Edward Island	potatoes, soil health	
Kentville Research and Development Centre	Nova Scotia	horticulture, berries	
St John's Research and Development Centre	Newfoundland and Labrador	cold-climate crops, soils	

The goal of all research activities is to address the major scientific challenges facing 21st century agricultural production systems:

- Increasing agricultural productivity,
- Enhancing environmental performance,
- Improving attributes for food and non-food uses,
- Addressing threats to the agriculture and agri-food value chain.

== Industry support ==
Agriculture and Agri-Food Canada is also responsible for supporting corporate and local agricultural producers and suppliers. They do this through a variety of programs and services including Agri-Geomatics which develops products and services for internal and external users, and program facilitation.

The department supports market growth through its market access and trade negotiation activities, and it works with Canada's provinces and territories to promote Canadian products. The department also supports industry by focusing on science and technology advances and helping producers mitigate risks.

== Agrivoltaics ==
Agrivoltaics, also known as agro-photovoltaics, is the practice of using the same land for both solar energy production and agriculture. This system places solar panels above crops or pastures, allowing sunlight to generate electricity while still supporting plant growth underneath.

This approach helps farmers make more efficient use of their land, especially in areas where space is limited. Agrivoltaic systems can also protect crops from extreme weather, reduce water evaporation, and sometimes even increase crop yields by creating a cooler, shaded microclimate. In places like Canada, studies have shown that using just 1% of farmland for agrivoltaics could provide up to one-third of the country’s electricity needs, all while continuing food production.

== Notable people ==
=== Botany ===
- Faith Fyles (1875-1961), botanical artist
- Felicitas Svejda (1920-2016), creator of the explorer roses
- Isobella Preston (1881-1965), plant hybridization/breeding

=== Cereals and Pulses ===
- Nancy Ames, researcher of barley
- Vern Burrows (1930-2020), international authority on oat breeding and utilisation
- Jennifer Mitchell Fetch, expert in oat breeding
- Soon Jai Park (1937-2018), author of dry bean breeding program
- Charles E. Saunders (1867-1937), inventor of the 'Marquis' wheat cultivar

=== Climate Change, Sustainable Agricultural Practices, and Nutrient Cycling ===
- Raymond Desjardins, expert in agricultural meteorology and climate change
- Barbara Cade-Menun, world leader in studying phosphorus cycling
- Guy Lafond (d. 2013), researcher in no-till farming

=== Earth Observation ===
- Heather McNairn, specialist in remote sensing technology
- Elizabeth Pattey, specialist in micrometeorology

=== Food Processing ===
- Joyce Boye, specialist in value-added food processing, food safety and food quality
- Mary MacArthur (1904-1959), researcher on the processes of dehydration and freezing of fresh foods, first woman to be named as fellow of the Agricultural Institute of Canada (1952)
- Michèle Marcotte, creator of the method of osmotic dehydration of food

=== Horticulture ===
- Donald A. Young (1929-2015), developed new sorts of potatoes

=== Pest Management ===
- Karen Bailey, specialist in plant pathology and biopesticide development
- Deena Errampalli, worked on postharvest pathology of temperate tree fruits

=== Plant Genetics ===
- Sylvie Cloutier, specialist in molecular genetics

=== Livestock ===
- Karen Beauchemin (b. 1956), international authority on methane emissions and ruminant nutrition
- Helene Lapierre, researcher of animal metabolism
- Karen Schwartzkopf-Genswein, expert in farm animal behaviour, health and welfare

=== Mycology and Plant Pathology ===
- Yolande Dalpé (1948), first mycologist in Ottawa to study the taxonomy of mycorrhizal fungi
- Mary Elizabeth Elliott (1923-1976), worked on taxonomy and physiology of Sclerotiniaceae
- Margaret Newton
- Mildred K. Nobles
- Luella Weresub
- Marvin Weintraub (1971-1989), director of Vancouver Research Station

=== Oil Seeds ===
- Keith Downey
- Isobel Parkin

=== Soil Fertility ===
- Constantine Campbell
- Cynthia Grant
- G. Clarke Topp
- Noura Ziadi

== See also ==
- Canadian Agricultural Safety Association
- Prairie Farm Rehabilitation Administration
- Secretary of State (Rural)
