= Mary MacArthur =

Canadian scientist (1904–1959)

- Born: January 20, 1904; Glasgow, Scotland
- Died: April 26, 1959 (aged 55); Pugwash, Nova Scotia
- Education: Acadia University; Radcliffe College
- Scientific career
- Fields: botany and agricultural science
- Workplaces: Central Experimental Farm

Mary MacArthur (January 20, 1904 – April 26, 1959) was a Canadian scientist who performed research on the principles of the successful dehydration and freezing of fresh foods. She performed this research while employed by the federal government of Canada's Department of Agriculture at the Central Experimental Farm in Ottawa, Ontario. In 1952 she was the first woman to be named as Fellow of the Agricultural Institute of Canada (FAIC) for her contributions to Canadian agriculture.

== Biography ==
Mary MacArthur was born in Glasgow, Scotland. She came to Canada as a child and her family settled in Pugwash, Nova Scotia. She became interested in botany at an early age.

She obtained a B.Sc. with Honors from Acadia University, Nova Scotia, in 1933, after attending a botany course at the Marine Biological Laboratory in Woods Hole, Massachusetts the prior year. She then earned an M.A. at Radcliffe College (affiliated with Harvard University) in 1934 and received her PhD from Harvard in 1937.

== Career ==
After graduation, MacArthur was an assistant professor of botany at a woman's college in Elmira, New York, from 1937 to 1938. In 1938 she accepted a position as an agricultural scientist, Horticulture Division, at the Central Experimental Farm in Ottawa, Ontario, Canada. Her early specialty was plant histology and cytology.

MacArthur became well known for her leadership of Canadian research into dehydration, which included fundamental research on methods for determining the inactivation of enzymes in plant tissues prior to dehydration. She had a large dehydration tunnel built in Ottawa, Ontario in 1942, in which she conducted more than 2000 experiments during the last four years of World War II. She is credited with identifying that vegetables needed blanching to inactivate enzymes before dehydration. She worked jointly with scientists at Kentville, Nova Scotia, who provided her with the dehydrated vegetables for further analysis in Ottawa, Ontario. This was an important activity during the war years as many fruits and vegetables had to be dehydrated and shipped to Europe for the war effort. As a result of her work the appearance and nutritional value of commercial dehydrated cabbages, carrots, potatoes and turnips improved markedly. Her research on the suitability of different varieties of fruits and vegetables for freezing, which had been interrupted by the war efforts, was reactivated in 1944. Before the end of the Second World War MacArthur also published a paper on the freezing of commercially packaged asparagus, corn and strawberries.

In 1945 the Consumer Section, Market Service of Agriculture Canada published the first booklet on home freezing based on this research. By 1949, MacArthur also summarized her research into a booklet for use by the commercial food industry. MacArthur assisted Malcolm Bancroft Davis, chief of Division of Horticulture for the Dominion Department of Agriculture until 1955, who conducted research on the preservation of fruits and vegetables by freezing and gas storage of apples.

== Honours and awards ==
In 1952, Mary MacArthur was the first woman to become a member of the Agricultural Institute of Canada.

== Death ==
Mary MacArthur died on April 26, 1959, as a consequence of rheumatic heart disease in Pugwash, Nova Scotia, where she and her two sisters had refurbished a cottage.

== See also ==
- Timeline of women in science
