= Karen Beauchemin =

Canadian agricultural scientist

- Born: 1956 (age 69–70); Montreal, Quebec
- Scientific career
- Fields: nutrition
- Workplaces: Agriculture and Agri-Food Canada

Karen Beauchemin is a Canadian scientist working at the Lethbridge Research and Development Centre. She is recognized as an international authority on methane emissions and ruminant nutrition. Her research helps develop farming techniques that improve how we raise cattle for meat and milk, while reducing the environmental impacts of livestock production.

The work of Beauchemin and her colleagues, has led to Agriculture and Agri-Food Canada being recognized as a world leader in measuring greenhouse gases and in developing strategies to reduce emissions from agricultural activities including from livestock production. Beauchemin has been recognized with awards from the Canadian Society of Animal Science, American Dairy Science Association, the Chinese Academy of Science, and the Royal Swedish Academy of Agriculture and Forestry in Stockholm, Sweden.

== Biography ==
Beauchemin was born in 1956 in Montreal, Quebec. She was raised in Nova Scotia until the age of 10, and then moved with her family to Quebec. During her formative years, she developed an interest in food and nutrition, which led her to pursue a career in animal science.

Beauchemin obtained a BSc in agriculture with honours at McGill University (1978), an MSc in animal nutrition at Université de Laval (1982), and a PhD in ruminant nutrition with distinction at the University of Guelph (1988). She married Sean McGinn in 1983, and together they have two daughters. She and her husband reside in Lethbridge, Alberta.

== Career ==
Before starting her PhD, Beauchemin spent several years in the feed industry as a beef and dairy cattle nutritionist for a large feed manufacturer. She began her research career as a scientist at Agriculture and Agri-Food Canada’s Lethbridge Research and Development Centre in Alberta in 1988. She was promoted to RES5, the highest level in the federal research scientist classification, in 2005. She is also an adjunct professor at the University of Alberta, the University of Saskatchewan, Utah State University, and a former adjunct professor at the University of British Columbia.

In the early stages of her career, Beauchemin's research focused mainly on dairy cattle nutrition, but in later years her interests widened to include both beef and dairy cattle. She worked on various aspects of nutrition over the years and made many outstanding contributions to the dairy and beef industries in the area of rumen function and feed utilization. Beauchemin developed a broad based research program to improve feed utilization of cattle, with specific interests in the areas of rumen function and feed digestion, acidosis prevention, physically effective fiber, forage and grain utilization, and enteric methane mitigation.

Beauchemin's research in the area of rumen function has led to guidelines that minimize ruminal acidosis in dairy cows and feedlot cattle, while maintaining high levels of animal production. She studied the dietary factors that contribute to subacute ruminal acidosis, as well as the role of physically effective fiber in stimulating rumen function and digestion. The results from these studies have contributed to dietary fiber recommendations for cattle.

Beauchemin is also internationally recognized for her work in the area of improving the utilization of forages by ruminants through the use of feed enzyme technology and other feed additives. The focus of her work has been to identify the mechanisms of action whereby enzymes improve feed digestion, such that feed enzymes that ensure positive and consistent results can be developed for the cattle industry.

More recently, Beauchemin extended her research to examine the larger environmental aspects of cattle farming. She developed a research program in the early 2000s to measure methane emissions from cattle with the goal of finding ways to curb those emissions. Her research looks at the impact of ruminant production systems on greenhouse gas emissions, with the aim of developing strategies to reduce the enteric methane that is produced by cattle as a byproduct of digesting fiber. Her research is leading to novel nutritional approaches that improve air quality and lessen the environmental footprint of the livestock sector. Her research has found that by feeding a new methane-inhibiting supplement to cattle, t it is possible to reduce methane production by 30%. In addition to curbing greenhouse gas emissions, reducing methane produced during feed digestion improves the efficiency by which dairy cows and beef cattle convert plant material into food (milk and meat) for people.

In 2011, Beauchemin was awarded the Bertebos Prize, a prestigious award from the Royal Swedish Academy of Agriculture and Forestry, for her work on curbing methane emissions. Beauchemin used the prize money to establish a scholarship fund at the Kwame Nkrumah University of Science and Technology in Kumasi, Ghana to promote the education of women. So far, the scholarship has been awarded to three female graduate students pursuing graduate degrees in animal science.

Beauchemin served as an invited member of the Committee on Nutrient Requirements of Beef Cattle, National Academy of Sciences, Engineering and Medicine. The committee recently published the 8th Revised edition of the Nutrient Requirements of Beef Cattle, which is the feeding guidelines for beef cattle in North America.As the sole Canadian invited member, her contributions to the Nutrient Requirements of Beef Cattle, helped ensure that the publication was also suitable for Canadian conditions. Today this is universally used by nutritionists, veterinarians, and feed regulators such as the Canadian Food Inspection Agency.

Since 1984, Beauchemin has been an active member of the American Dairy Science Association, the American Society of Animal Science, and the Canadian Society of Animal Science (past-president, 2000–01).

Beauchemin retired from the public service in 2022. Throughout her career, Beauchemin has published a total of 16 book chapters, 21 authoritative reviews, 390 peer-reviewed scientific papers, with many of these papers published in high impact journals, and more than 850 technology transfer articles, abstracts, conference proceedings, and presentations.

Beauchemin is recognized as a Woman of Impact in Canada for her scientific contributions as a woman in STEM (science, technology, engineering and math).

== Honours and awards ==
- B.Sc. awarded with honours, 1978
- Ph.D. awarded with distinction, 1988
- Natural Science and Engineering Research Council doctoral student award, 1983–88
- 1st prize for presentation in CSAS Graduate Student Competition, 1987
- Canadian Society of Animal Science Young Scientist Award, 1994
- Travel Scholarship, Japanese Society for the Promotion of Science, 2005
- American Dairy Science Association Pioneer Hi-Bred Forage Award, 2005
- Gold Harvest Award of Excellence, Agriculture and Agri-Food Canada, 2007
- George B. Caine Foundation Award, Utah State University, 2008
- Sir Frederick McMaster Fellowship, CSIRO, Australia, 2009
- Canadian Society of Animal Science Excellence in Nutrition and Meat Science Award, 2009
- American Dairy Science Association, Nutrition Professionals Applied Dairy Nutrition Award, 2010
- The Bertebos Prize, Royal Swedish Academy of Agriculture and Forestry, 2011
- Visiting Professorship for Senior International Scientists, Chinese Academy of Sciences, 2011–13
- Canadian Society of Animal Science Fellowship Award, 2014
- Canadian Beef Industry Award for Outstanding Research and Innovation, 2020
- Gold Harvest Award, Agriculture and Agri-Food Canada, 2021
- Women of Impact in Canada - Women in STEM Gallery
