= Donald A. Young =

Donald A. Young CM (October 21, 1929 – December 7, 2015) was a Canadian scientist whose research greatly impacted potato production in North America, and the international French-fry industry. He is best known for developing the Shepody potato. Released in 1980, Shepody was the first potato developed specifically for the North American French fry market and quickly became popular with farmers. Young received many honours throughout his career, including the prestigious Order of Canada.

== Biography ==
Young was born on October 21, 1929, in Fredericton, New Brunswick, and grew up on the Experimental Farm that was later to become the Agriculture Canada Research Station. Young’s father, Lou C. Young, was the first head of the Potato Breeding Section, and was also recognized with an Honorary Life Membership in The Potato Association of America in 1966. Young studied at Nova Scotia Agricultural College (1950), Truro, NS, completed a Bachelor of Science at Macdonald College, McGill University, followed by a Ph.D. in Genetics and Plant Pathology at the University of Wisconsin. He was granted an Honorary Doctor of Laws from Nova Scotia Agricultural College (Dalhousie University) in 1993.

== Career ==
Young spent many summers working as a student at what is now the Fredericton Research and Development Centre. In 1957, he completed his Ph.D. degree and immediately joined Agriculture and Agri-Food Canada as a research scientist in Fredericton, New Brunswick. In 1967 he became Program Leader of the Potato Breeding Program. Young played a major role in the rapid development of Atlantic potato infrastructure during the 1960s and 1970s.

Young established a multidisciplinary work group that was unique in North America team to pioneer the breeding of varieties for niche markets (early maturing, chipping, and French frying varieties as well as several varieties for offshore markets and starch production). His personal research focussed on data handling systems, potato quality selection methods, and yield prediction. In 1968 the Breeding Program developed the first computer-based information retrieval system, to be used in a breeding program anywhere.

In 1963, Young had begun a research project to define the physical and chemical characteristics of French fry quality, then searched for those characterises in a collection of 400 potato varieties, and crossed varieties with the desired characteristics, growing them in the field and selecting the best plants. During his career he would cross over 3 million potato plants.

The Shepody potato that he is credited with developing was a 1967 cross between test variety, F58050 and Bake King from Cornell university – it matured earlier in the season and required 10 to 20 percent less nitrogen than other varieties. Shepody gained wide acceptance in North America, Europe, China and Australia and is still grown around the world in countries with a French frying industry. "Team Shepody" received several national awards including Agriculture Canada’s Certificate of Excellence in Research and Technology Transfer in 1992. In his 20 years as Project Leader more than a dozen new potato varieties were released including several with familiar names: Yukon Gold, Caribe and Raritan. The whitefleshed, purple-skinned variety Caribe was released for the Caribbean market, and two yellow-fleshed varieties, Donna and Brador, were released on an exclusive basis for the development of off-shore seed export markets.

In 1975, Young’s research team moved from the Alma Substation in New Brunswick to new facilities at Benton Ridge. In 1978, he managed a joint International Potato Centre–Fredericton Potato Breeding Program research project on predicting the response of selections in environments where they had not been tested which involved trials in 12 countries.

Young helped create the Canadian Seed Potato Export Agency, serving as technical director as well as chairman of the Technical School Committee, a cooperative project with Nova Scotia Agricultural College which delivers technology training to selected students from countries who purchase Canadian seed potatoes. Within the potato research community, Young chaired the Atlantic Potato Committee, in 1970 edited the first three editions of the Atlantic Canada Potato Production Guide and was involved in a working group which shared research and extension developments between the State of Maine and Canada's Maritime provinces.

Young retired from Agriculture and Agri-Food Canada in 1986. He joined McCain Foods as a part-time consultant, helping them establish and coordinate worldwide potato research and development projects, evaluate potential sites for new processing plants, and address specific regional potato production problems for the Company.

During his 46-year professional career, Young worked in 29 countries around the world and worked on several projects with the Canadian International Development Agency (CIDA). He spent five years as technical director of a CIDA sponsored project in Keshan, China (1986–1990) and went on assignment (1983-1984) as the Potato Section Leader in a CIDA sponsored Bangladesh Crop Diversification Project (1983-1984).

Young was a member of the Fredericton Botanic Garden Association, The Nature Trust of New Brunswick and a Friend of the Unitarian Fellowship of Fredericton.

== Honours and awards ==
- Potato Association of America, President (1987), Honorary Life Membership (1991).
- Doctor of Laws, honoris causa, Dalhousie University (1993)
- New Brunswick Potato Museum, Hall of Recognition (2007)
- Member, Order of Canada (2010)
- Creation of the Dr. Donald Young Plant Science Award, Dalhousie University in 2016
