= Soon Jai Park =

Canadian researcher of bean production

Soon Jai Park, Ph.D. (1937–2018) was a Canadian federal research scientist at Agriculture and Agri-Food Canada in Harrow, Ontario. He was internationally known for his dry bean breeding program that expanded bean production in Canada – taking beans that are usually grown in Africa, India, Korea, Japan and Brazil, and breeding them so they could thrive in Ontario and Western Canada to give farmers new crops to grow. He developed more than 28 bean varieties during his 25 year career (it takes 10 years to develop a new variety.)

== Biography ==
Park was born in Korea in 1937 and started his career there. In 1963 Park worked as a rice breeder at a research station in Suwon, Korea, with training stints at an international rice research centre in the Philippines. In 1981 he joined Agriculture and Agri-Food Canada and worked there until retirement in 2006. He adopted a team approach to bean breeding, involving the expertise of crop physiologists, pathologists and entomologists.

== Career ==
In 1981, Park started working navy beans and developed 19 varieties, five of which were registered after his retirement.

The navy beans that Park helped develop include:

- Dresden (1987)
- Mitchell (1987)
- Centralia (1988)
- Shetland (1991)
- Harowood (1991)
- HR 14 (1992)
- HR 20 (1992)
- HR 46 (1995)
- AC Compass (2000)
- AC Mast (2001)
- AC Trident (2001)
- AC Cruiser (2003)
- Nautica (2005)
- Kippen (2005)
- Galley (2007)
- Apex (2011)
- Portage (2011)
- AAC Shock (2017)
- AAC Argosy (2018)

Emerging ethnic markets influenced the study of additional bean varieties and new cropping systems in the 1980s. Cooperation between scientists and the processing industry was important in developing varieties for new and innovative foods. Park helped develop and introduce various kidney, black, pinto, mung and adzuki beans as well as the specialty beans otebo and kintoki, which are exported to Japan for use in confections.

The other dry beans that Park helped develop include:

- Aresteuben (yellow eye bean, 1987)
- Harblack (black bean, 1992)
- AC Litekid (light red kidney bean, 1996)
- AC Darkid (dark red kidney bean, 1996)
- AC Harosprout (mungbean, 1997)
- AC Gemco (azuki bean, 1997)
- AC Ole (Pint bean, 1999)
- AC Elk (light red kidney bean, 1999)
- AC Calmont (dark red kidney bean, 1999)
- Harohawk (black bean, 2007)
- Red Rider (cranberry bean, 2009)

Although most of the Centre’s bean breeding plots are in southern Ontario, scientists have worked extensively with researchers in western Canada and with universities and public institutions in the United States and Europe. Beans developed at the Centre are grown in the Maritimes, Prairies and the United States and many are exported to Europe for consumption. For example, AC Pintoba, a pinto bean that is common in Mexican food, made 40% of the acreage grown in Manitoba in the early-mid 2000s.

Soon was a scientist and made major contributions to Canadian agriculture. The many varieties of edible beans that he developed and made available for Canadian growers could establish his legacy as a prominent and dedicated public servant.

== Selected publications ==
- Park S J, Dhanvantari B N. 1987. Transfer of common blight (Xanthomonas campestris pv. phaseoli) resistance from Phaseolus coccineus L. to P. vulgaris L. through interspecific hybridization. Canadian Journal of Plant Science. 67: 685–695.
- Chaudhary, S; Anderson, T. R; Park, S. J; Yu, K. 2006. Comparison of Screening Methods for Resistance to Fusarium Root Rot in Common Beans (Phaseolus vulgaris L.), Journal of Phytopathology, Volume 154, Issue 5
- Dongfang, Yang; Conner, R.L; Balasubramanian, P; Yu, K; Park, S.J; Penner, W.C; Yager, L.M. 2007. Phenotypic and genotypic identification of anthracnose resistance in kidney bean cultivars grown in western Canada, Canadian Journal of Plant Science, Volume 87, Issue 2
- Park, S. J. 1993. Response of bush and upright plant type selections to white mold and seed yield of common beans grown in various row widths in various row widths in southern Ontario. Canadian Journal of Plant Science, Volume 73, Issue 1
- J. C. Tu and , S. J. Park 1993. Root-rot resistance in common bean Canadian Journal of Plant Science, 73(1): 365–367.
- Chaudhary, S; Anderson, T. R; Park, S. J; Yu, K. 2006. Comparison of Screening Methods for Resistance to Fusarium Root Rot in Common Beans (Phaseolus vulgaris L.). Journal of Phytopathology, Volume 154, Issue * S. J. Park, B. N. Dhanvantari 1987. Transfer of common blight (Xanthomonas campestris pv phaseoli) resistance from Phaseolus coccineus Lam. TO P. vulgaris L. through interspecific hybridization Canadian Journal of Plant Science, 67(3): 685–695.
