= Michèle Marcotte =

Michèle Marcotte is a Canadian food scientist who is a pioneer in food processing research. As a federal scientist with Agriculture and Agri-Food Canada (AAFC), she created a new method of fruit dehydration which can also be applied to vegetables, meat, or fish known as osmotic dehydration. Collaboration with private industry led to the design, development, installation, and start-up of a custom build dried-cranberry production line that is unique to the world. Her research was recognized with several awards including one from the Canadian Society for Bioengineering. Marcotte is currently the Director of the Ottawa Research and Development Centre located at the Central Experimental Farm in Canada.

== Biography ==
Marcotte completed a bachelor's degree in chemical engineering from Laval University in 1985. After completing her master's degree in food engineering at the University of Alberta in 1988, she began her career with Agriculture and Agri-Food Canada (AAFC) as a professional engineer at the Food Research and Development Centre located in St. Hyacinthe, Quebec. In 1999, Marcotte obtained her Ph.D. in food processing from McGill University where she studied the ohmic heating process of viscous liquids.

== Career ==
Marcotte has worked at Agriculture and Agri-Food Canada as a section head of food preservation technologies, a research scientist in Food Processing and Engineering, and an advisor to the Director General of the Food Safety and Quality National Science Program. Marcotte's research interests included:

- The development of tools for the characterization of thermophysical properties;
- The use of modeling and optimization technique in order to describe the evolution of product safety and quality upon processing; and
- The development and optimization of novel thermal processes and thermal dehydration processes.

Under the Federal Partners in Technology Transfer (FPTT) program, Marcotte and her team at the Development Centre partnered with Atoka Cranberries to produce a unique two-step drying process for cranberries that has been commercially implemented in Quebec. The innovation utilizes osmosis, a natural process to partially dehydrate and sweeten the fruit in order to make them more palatable. This method may also be used on fruits, vegetables, meat, and fish. Among other developments Marcotte has worked on a prototype pilot oven for the optimization of baking and computer software to establish cooking-cooling cycle for meat products. From 2006 to 2007, Marcotte was President of the Canadian Institute of Food Science and Technology. In 2009, Marcotte became the Science Director of the Eastern Cereal and Oilseed Research Centre (now the Ottawa Research and Development Centre) located in Ottawa, Ontario where she was responsible for corporate research on food and health. She is the Canadian representative of the International Association on Engineering and Foods (IAEF) and the International Union of Food Science and Technology (IUFoST).

In 2014, Marcotte became responsible for the implementation and reporting related to Agriculture and Agri-Food Canada's National Science Strategy on Biodiversity, Bioresources and Collection and is often on Canadian Delegations for international treaties and conventions. Marcotte was one of the two agricultural delegates of the Canadian delegation participating to the 13th Conference of Parties and the 14th Conference of Parties of the Convention of Biological Diversity to intervene on issues related to agriculture (e.g. pollinators, synthetic biology, digital sequence information on genetic resources, invasive alien species etc.). Marcotte was one of four Canadian delegates participating to the deliberations of the 7th and the 8th Governing Body of the FAO-International Treaty of Plant Genetic Resources for Food and Agriculture, held in the fall of 2017 and 2019 respectively and participated to the 17th Session of the Commission on Genetic Resources for Food and Agriculture. In 2015, Marcotte also became Canada's Liaison Officer for CABI (Centre for Agriculture and Biosciences International).

Marcotte has also served as a supervisor for a number of cooperative and graduate students in her laboratory and has authored more than 60 peer-reviewed papers, 120 conference papers, and 45 research reports.

== Honours and awards ==
- AgCellence Prize from Agriculture and Agri-Food Canada (Innovation) in 1998;
- Two André-Latour Innovation Prizes (1999–2000) of the Foundation INITIA;
- The Excellence Prize of Treasury Board from the Canadian Public Service of the Government of Canada in 2000;
- The Federal Partnership for Technology Transfer (FPTT) in 2003, an Industry Canada award for the successful development, construction, installation and start-up of a production mechanism to improve the process of drying cranberries;
- The Excellence in Research Prize from the Governor's Foundation of Agriculture and Agri-Food Canada in 2004;
- In February 2009, the Quebec Order of Engineers featured a cover story in its monthly magazine on the role of engineering for food safety.
- The John Clark Award of the Canadian Society of Biological Engineers (CSBE) in 2010;
- The Agriculture and Agri-Food Canada Research Branch Recognition for the 125th Anniversary Celebration for her contribution in food processing and engineering in 2011;
- The W.J. Eva Award of the Canadian Institute of Food Science and Technology (CIFST) for her outstanding contributions to engineering applied to food systems through service in research, training and management in 2012.
