= Nancy Ames (scientist) =

Canadian scientist

Nancy Ames is a Canadian scientist with Agriculture and Agri-Food Canada known for her research on the nutrition and quality of cereals and pulses. She works closely with plant scientists to maximize the health benefits of new varieties and ensure that these benefits are maintained when the crops are harvested and processed. Ames also works with food processors to develop new food processing techniques and new ways to evaluate them. She has invented new food products and holds two patents. She was the scientific lead that lead to the health claim “Barley beta-glucan soluble fibre and reduction of blood cholesterol, a risk factor for cardiovascular disease” which was approved by Health Canada in 2012. She has been instrumental in promoting the health benefits of cereal grains in Canada.

== Biography ==
Nancy Ames received her B.Sc. (Food Science, 1980) and M.Sc. (Plant Science, 1982) from the University of Manitoba. Ames worked as a forage crop specialist for Manitoba Agriculture (1981-1984) before returning to school to pursue further graduate studies. She joined Agriculture and Agri-Food Canada's (AAFC's) Plant Research Centre in Ottawa, Ontario as a Ph.D. student in 1984, and received her Ph.D. (Crop Science, 1989) from the University of Guelph, Ontario. She then began her career as a research scientist in 1989 at the Plant Research Centre in Ottawa, where she worked for five years before joining the former Cereal Research Centre in Winnipeg, Manitoba as a research scientist in 1995. In 2005, Ames's office was co-located at the Richardson Centre for Functional Food and Nutraceuticals where she continues to work for AAFC. Ames is also an adjunct professor with the University of Manitoba in the Department of Human Nutritional Sciences as well as the Department of Food Science.

== Career ==
Ames works with crop breeders, researchers and industry to develop and test new varieties and food processing techniques that maximize the health properties and potential use of Canadian grains and pulses. She has served on Western Canada's Prairie Grain Development Committees for Oat Quality and Wheat, Rye and Triticale Quality and has contributed to the development of several new oat, wheat and barley varieties. Her research has shown that modern wheat varieties have a similar nutritional composition to wheat grown in Canada 150 years ago.

Ames research focuses on the bioactive components in cereal grains (barley, oat, wheat, and others) and pulses and their impact on human health. Ames’ continuous efforts towards food barley improvement were culminated in her initiative to pursue a therapeutic health claim for barley based on its cholesterol lowering properties. Ames contributed to information supporting a barley health claim in the United States, which was approved in 2006. In 2007, she initiated a similar approach in Canada with hopes of transforming barley into a mainstream food product in addition to its use as animal feed and in making beer and ale. She invited a large group of barley stakeholders, including breeders, growers, processors, food scientists, nutritionists and others, to discuss the idea of a similar Canadian barley health claim. With their support, Ames and members of her laboratory took a leadership role in the detailed process of preparing a health claim petition, which was submitted by the Alberta Barley Commission, as a representative of the barley industry, to Health Canada in February 2009. In July 2012, Health Canada approved the health claim that barley fibre reduces cholesterol and risk of heart disease. During this process, she also identified and completed supplementary research to support this claim.

Ames has contributed significantly in the area of food product development. Her early research resulted in two food product patents: Processed barley food products (Publication number: 20050025867, filed July 2004) and Production of tortillas made from waxy barley cultivars (Publication number: 20020018835, filed May 2001) She also developed “instant barley,” a popcorn-like product that is “ready in five minutes,” and contributed recipes and ideas to several cookbooks and hosted various public events to increase the use of barley in main courses, salads and desserts. Ames has developed and tested methods to use high-pea flour to create low-glycemic and nutritious baked goods such as bagels and steamed buns.

Ames has worked with various organizations to actively promote grains as part of a healthy diet. She has been invited as a guest speaker at many scientific and public events as a scientific authority on the health properties of grains and pulses. As part of this promotion, she also helped organize the “World’s Biggest Bowl of Oatmeal,” and has appeared on various Canadian TV Shows. She has been an active member of the American Association of Cereal Chemists International and has served on the scientific advisory boards for the Healthy Grains Institute and the Quaker Oats Center of Excellence.

Ames also studies how processing affects the functionality and health benefits of grain and pulse based foods. To accomplish this, she has also helped develop analytical and in vitro methods to predict health benefits and leads collaborative studies including clinical trials. In 2016, her lab acquired a "model" or "artificial" stomach which mimics the digestive processes of the human stomach and upper intestine. Her team has used the stomach to test the digestive properties of wheat, oats, chickpeas and lentils and how ingredient ratios, serving size, processing and cooking methods impact digestion. Ultimately, this tool will help Ames identify the health benefits of Canadian grains and pulses.

Ames research recently discovered that barley is beneficial for the gut microbiome. Barley beta-glucan can act as a prebiotic by modulating the composition of the microbiota in the gut, which can improve overall metabolic health in humans. This barley cholesterol clinical trial was also the first to show that human genetic background impacts physiological response to barley consumption, contributing novel findings to the field of nutrigenomics. These ground breaking discoveries along with her continued exploration of health benefits of cereal grains and pulses such as improved glycemic response will advance the level of academia's knowledge of Canadian grain and pulse nutrition.

Ames is actively involved in the Verna J. Kirkness Science and Engineering Education Program which brings Indigenous Grade 11 students from Winnipeg, rural and northern Manitoba, British Columbia, and New Brunswick to the University of Manitoba campus to experience first-hand the joy of scientific research. Students representing First Nations, Métis and Inuit communities come to campus to be mentored by more than 100 professors, postdoctoral fellows, graduate and undergraduate students, and research technicians.

Ames has authored and co-authored over 85 peer-reviewed publications, numerous abstracts and several book chapters.

== Honours and awards ==
- 2018 Recipient of Agriculture and Agri-Food Canada's Prize for Outstanding Achievement in Science
- 2016 Mentor of the year award in recognition of outstanding contributions to the Sanofi-Aventis BioTalent Challenge.
- 2015 American Association of Cereal Chemists International Edith Christensen Award.
- 2012 Accuracy Award for Analysis of Dietary Fiber, for the most accurate and precise results in 2011 for insoluble, soluble, total dietary fiber and beta-glucan.
- 2012 Recognition of Analytical Performance in Analysis of Dietary Fiber, with an "Outstanding Accuracy and Precision" rating for 2011 for insoluble, soluble, total dietary fiber and beta-glucan.
- Led a team of volunteers who on March 20, 2010, prepared a 327.5 kg bowl of oatmeal – setting a new world record for the Largest Bowl of Oatmeal (close to double the previous Guinness world record of 171.9 kilograms).
- 2010 AAFC Instant Award for achieving the Guinness world record for the biggest bowl of oatmeal, and the success of the 2010 CIFST-AAFC Conference and AAFC Food Network Meeting.
- 2008 American Association of Cereal Chemists International Accuracy Award for Dietary Fiber Analysis.
- 2008 American Association of Cereal Chemists International Certificate of Proficiency for Dietary Fiber Analysis.
- 2007-2008 Biotech Challenge Mentor of the Year-Distinction, Aventis Biotech Challenge CANADA
