= Isobel Parkin =

Canadian research scientist

Isobel Parkin is a Canadian research scientist with Agriculture and Agri-Food Canada. She is one of the world's premier canola scientists and her area of expertise focuses on brassica genomics, comparative genome organization, global gene expression analysis, and abiotic stress responses. She is well known for her work on an international project on the genetics of oil seeds, in particular the mapping and sequencing of the canola oil genome. She Co-led the Canadian Canola Genome Sequence (CanSeq) team that successfully deciphered the canola genome and developed a high-quality genome sequence.

== Biography ==
Parkin was born in the United Kingdom and pursued her Ph.D. in genomics from the John Innes Centre in Norwich, England. She was recruited in the late 1990s to co-lead the Canadian Canola Sequencing Initiative (CanSeq) with Andrew Sharpe at the Global Institute for Food Security at the University of Saskatchewan. Parkin is currently working on genomics, genetics and bioinformatics platforms and functional genomics of stress resistance in plants at the Saskatoon Research and Development Centre in Saskatoon. Isobel Parkin joined Agriculture and Agri-food Canada in 1999. She has been an adjunct Professor at the University of Saskatchewan since 2004.

== Career ==
Parkin's career started with her recruitment to work on the Canadian Canola Sequencing Initiative (CanSeq) at the Global Institute for Food Security at the University of Saskatchewan, where she was involved in some of the earliest genetic mapping of canola or Brassica napus. Parkin's research is focused on genomics, bioinformatics and molecular biology of Brassica and related organisms. She applies various genomics tools to improve the crop performance and understand basic mechanisms and evolution.

Parkin's work has earned her recognition by the canola industry on a global scale. Isobel's current research funding sources include the Global Institute for Food Security (GIFS), Saskatchewan Agriculture Development Fund, AAFC Crop Genomics Initiative, and canola producer groups.

Thus far, the high point of Parkin's career is the successful mapping of the canola oil genome along with her international teammates. In 2014 her team announced they had successfully deciphered the complex genome of canola. The results of the team's work on canola oil will help plant breeders and growers increase oil content, increase the yield of each crop, determine a sustainable level of yield for the future, help modify seeds to make the plant less susceptible to drought, cold temperatures, diseases, and help in the breeding and development of new variants.

Parkin also led a Canadian research team that published its results on sequencing another brassica species, camelina, in 2016. Camelina is showing promise for Canadian agriculture as it can be produced on marginal lands with lower input than other oilseeds, and can be used as feedstock for bioproducts like plastic and protein-rich food for fish and livestock. Parkin continues research in the area of camelina and collaborated with researchers from Dalhousie and Memorial University on a project examining its use in farmed fish diets.

Parkin co-lead a team with Sharpe that decoded the full genome for the Brassica nigra, or black mustard plant—research that will advance breeding of oilseed mustard crops and provide a foundation for improved breeding of wheat, canola and lentils. This research was published in the scientific journal Nature Plants in 2020. The team used a new genome sequencing technology (Nanopore) that results in very long “reads” of DNA and RNA sequences, providing information for crop breeding that was previously not available. The resulting gene assembly for black mustard also helps explain how the black mustard genome differs from those of its close crop relatives—such as cabbage, turnip and canola. The team also uncovered the first direct evidence of functional centromeres, structures on chromosomes essential for plant fertility, and detected other previously hard to identify regions of the genome. This knowledge provides a foundation for improving crop production. They are set to release more sequencing for Sinapis alpa or white mustard.

Parkin is highly active in the agriculture research community and has co-authored over 130 research publications in her career, over 80 of which have been published in the last 10 years. In collaboration with 130 internationally renowned agricultural scientists, she helped write a book titled Transgenic Plants and Crops, which “provides analyzes of the history, genetics, physiology, and cultivation of over 30 species of transgenic seeds, fruits, and vegetables.” Parkin says the goal of her genomics work is to improve the lot of farmers.

== Honours and awards ==
- Co-led the Canadian Canola Genome Sequencing (CanSeq) industry consortium project
- Speaker at the 14th International Rapeseed Congress in Saskatoon (2015)
