= Jennifer Mitchell Fetch =

Canadian Agronomist

Jennifer Mitchell Fetch is a Canadian research scientist with Agriculture and Agri-Food Canada (AAFC) with expertise in oat breeding. She is known for running the only organic oat breeding program in Canada and helping with the development of several oat milling quality cultivars, including the first organically developed cultivar, AAC Oravena. Canada is the largest exporter of oats in the world, emphasizing the importance of developing new and improved cultivars for farmers. Canada is responsible for producing approximately 3 million tonnes of quality oats every year, with 90% being from Western Canada, where Mitchell Fetch focused her research and was the only Agriculture Canada oat breeder for years. Mitchell Fetch was employed by AAFC in 1998 and spent 22 years as an oat breeder before her retirement in 2020.

== Biography ==
Jennifer Mitchell Fetch grew up in southwestern Saskatchewan, mostly in Swift Current. Her family had many ties to farming as her father was raised on a farm, and she had several family members that farmed for a living. Her father's love for farming provided her with a strong interest in agriculture from a young age.

Starting in 1975, during her University years, Mitchell Fetch worked as a summer student at AAFC's Swift Current Research Centre in its wheat and forage breeding programs. This position fueled her passion for plant breeding as a young adult. She attended the University of Saskatchewan, where she completed her B.Sc. in crop science in 1979, followed by her M.Sc. in 1981. After spending some time as a triticale breeder with the University of Manitoba, she started her Ph.D. in flax breeding at North Dakota State University (NDSU), which was completed in 1989. Her thesis explored the combination of high producing oil flax with high yielding straw flax to get a hybrid integrating the best features of both flax lines.

During her time at NDSU, she met Tom Fetch, another AAFC scientist and stem rust pathologist, and they married in 1985. In her free time, Jennifer enjoys traveling, reading, doing various crafts, being involved in her church community, curling with her husband, and watching the Bombers and the Winnipeg Jets.

== Career ==
In spring 1988, Mitchell Fetch worked with a private company as a canola breeder before completing her Ph.D. and continued there until December 1989. She then worked several technical positions at NDSU until she was offered an oat breeding position in 1998 with the Prairie Oat Breeding Consortium at the Agriculture and Agri-Food Canada Cereal Research Centre in Winnipeg. More recently, the breeding program was relocated from the Research Centre in Winnipeg to the Research Centre in Brandon, Manitoba where she spent the remainder of her career.

The Prairie Oat Breeding Consortium is a Government-Industry partnership funded program aiming to develop superior quality cultivars for the western Prairies. Western Canada is responsible for about 90% of Canada's oat production. The focus of Mitchell Fetch's research was to develop cultivars with improved agronomic, disease, and quality traits through collaboration with pathologists, quality chemists, molecular scientists, and agronomists. The production of oats is important, as Canada is the largest oat exporter in the world, and it's a cooler season crop that suits Canada's climate. Mitchell Fetch has been involved in the development of 12 oat cultivars in Western Canada and several in Eastern Canada. The oat cultivars include the first organically developed cultivar in Canada, AAC Oravena, followed by AAC Kongsore. Mitchell Fetch ran the only organic breeding oat program in all of Canada. Plant breeders typically select cultivars for performance in different regions and soil types, so selecting based on production systems, like organic, is relatively new. The organic community has been beneficial to her research by calling attention to important traits for their production systems.

Mitchell Fetch was involved in breeding other crops such as several wheat cultivars. She also provided germ plasm and expertise to projects in oat genomics. Mitchell Fetch has collaborated with researchers around the world, serving as the chair of the awards committee for the American Oat Workers and helping raise funds for their conferences. She was an associate editor for the Canadian Journal of Plant Science and served as secretary of the Breeding and Agronomy Evaluation Team of the Prairie Recommending Committee for Oats and Barley. Mitchell Fetch has also mentored new scientists in the practical aspects of plant breeding.

The oat and wheat cultivars that Mitchell Fetch helped develop include:

- Lee Williams Hulless Oat
- Lu Oat
- Pinnacle Oat
- AC Gwen Hulless Oat
- Ronald Oat
- Furlong Oat
- Jordan Oat
- Stainless Oat
- Leggett Oat
- Summit Oat
- Stride Oat
- AAC Banner Oat
- AAC Jatharia Canada Western Red Spring Wheat
- AAC Prevail Canada Western Red Spring Wheat
- AAC Magnet Canada Western Red Spring Wheat
- AAC LeRoy Canada Western Red Spring Wheat
- AAC Crossfield Red Spring Wheat
- AAC Warman Canada Western Red Spring Wheat
- AAC Redstar Hard Red Spring Wheat
- AAC Cameron Canada Western Red Spring Wheat
- AAC Foray Red Spring Wheat
- AAC Tenacious Red Spring Wheat

Jennifer Mitchell Fetch retired in 2020 and has expressed that upon her retirement she would like to see the cultivars she developed being grown widely, being used in many food products, and improving consumers’ health.

== Awards and achievements ==
- Recognized plant breeder by the Canadian Seed Growers Association (CSGA)
- Member of the Canadian Society of Agronomy
- Member of the American Societies of Agronomy and Crop Science
- Honorary Life Membership Award by the Manitoba Seed Growers Association in recognition of valuable service to the seed industry in December 2014
- Honorary Life Award by the Canadian Seed Growers Association 2020
- Awarded for Distinguished Service to Oat Improvement by the American Oat Workers in June 2018
- Outstanding Associate Editor Award by the Canadian Journal of Plant Science in 2018
