= Karen Bailey =

Research scientist

Karen Bailey is a retired research scientist who specialized in plant pathology and biopesticide development at Agriculture and Agri-Food Canada. Her research focused on developing alternatives to synthetic pesticides and improving plant health through integrated pest management strategies. She is internationally recognized for her expertise on soil-borne pathogens and biological control, and she has more than 250 publications, 23 patents, and 7 inventions disclosures in progress.

== Biography ==
Bailey received her B.Sc. (Agriculture) and M.Sc. from the University of Guelph. She joined Agriculture and Agri-Food Canada as a biologist, and later as a research scientist after obtaining her Ph.D. in Plant Pathology and Plant Breeding from the University of Saskatchewan.

== Career ==
Bailey’s expertise includes the discovery, development, and commercialization of biological weed control technologies as biopesticide products, as well as biological characterization, mass production systems for fungus, enhancement of fungal metabolite production, formulation and delivery of bioproducts, and knowledge of regulatory requirements in North America (Pest Management Regulatory Agency, Canada; Environmental Protection Agency, United States). Her work included the development of methods to reduce weed and plant disease pests through the use of integrated pest management strategies, aiming to promote ecologically balanced cropping systems, and the development and evaluation of microbial agents as herbicides and pesticides. In collaboration with Russell Hynes, Wes Taylor, Frances Leggett, and Claudia Sheedy at Agriculture and Agri-Food Canada, Bailey developed a patented bioherbicide to control broadleaved weeds in turfgrass. The indigenous fungus Phoma macrostoma was formulated to control weeds such as dandelion, clover, wild mustard, and ragweed, without harming crops and grasses. It can be applied as a granule to soil before the weeds emerge, which prevents establishment for 1–3 months, or applied post-emergence, which causes affected weeds to turn white and die due to a lack of chlorophyll.

Bailey has also been involved in numerous scientific projects in the U.S., Syria, Morocco, Tunisia, Egypt, Australia, New Zealand, Russia, India, Switzerland, and Belgium. She has been a member of the Editorial Boards for the journals Weed Research, Agriculture, Ecosystems, and the Environment, and Canadian Journal of Plant Science.

== Honours and awards ==
Bailey received the Canadian Phytopathological Society (CPS) Award for Achievements in Plant Disease Management, the CPS Award for Outstanding Research, and the Queen’s Diamond Jubilee Medal for her contributions to Canadian Agriculture. She was President of the Canadian Phytopathological Society.
