= Joyce Boye =

Food research scientist

- Education: University of Science and Technology, Ghana McGill University
- Awards: Special Ambassador for the International Year of Pulses 2016 (IYP)
- Scientific career
- Fields: Chemical Engineering Food science
- Workplaces: Agriculture and Agri-Food Canada (AAFC)

Joyce Irene Boye is the Director General of the Food Directorate, Health Products and Food Branch with Health Canada. She previously served as the Director General, Science and Technology Branch – Prairie Region, Agriculture and Agri-Food Canada from April 2019 to August 2023 and is a former federal food research scientist with Agriculture and Agri-Food Canada with a specialty in value-added food processing, food safety and food quality. She has expertise on plant proteins and their importance in helping to improve human health and nutrition. The Food and Agriculture Organization of the United Nations appointed Boye to be a Special Ambassador for North America for the 2016 International Year of Pulses.

== Biography ==
Boye has a bachelor's degree in chemical engineering (University of Science and Technology, Ghana) and a Ph.D. in food science (Department of Food Science and Agricultural Chemistry, McGill University, Montreal, QC). After working with AAFC as a postdoctoral fellow for a year, she joined the department in 1997 as research scientist at the Food Research and Development Centre in St. Hyacinthe (Quebec) where she led a variety of research projects in the areas of value-added food processing, food safety and food quality. In addition to her research activities within AAFC, she also served as a senior policy analyst, program coordinator and Agri-Food sector strategy coordinator, and as acting director of research, development and technology transfer of AAFC's research and development centres at Fredericton, Kentville and St-John's. She was also an adjunct professor at the Department of Bioresource Engineering, McGill University. Boye was Director General for Agriculture and Agri-Food Canada's Science and Technology Branch in the Prairie region from 2019 to 2023. She is currently Director General for the Food Directorate, Health Products and Food Branch of Health Canada.

== Career ==
Boye has worked extensively on pulses (peas, lentils, chickpeas, beans), soybeans, soy-based products and canola, in collaboration with the private sector to develop new processing techniques and new food products. Her projects have resulted in the development of several declarations of inventions, novel food products and license agreements between AAFC and the collaborating companies. She has authored/co-authored over 275 scientific and technical papers/reports/lectures including 85 peer-reviewed scientific papers and 29 book chapters and is editor/co-editor of 4 scientific books. Internationally, Boye served as an expert for global initiatives on human nutrition. She served as a member of the World Bank Agricultural Pull Mechanism Initiative Working Group on Nutrition launched by G20 members and was a Visiting Expert for the Food and Agriculture Organization of the United Nations in Rome where she contributed to the International FAO Expert Consultation on Protein Quality in Human Nutrition.

She now works for Health Canada.

== Honours and awards ==
- Special Ambassador for the International Year of Pulses 2016 (IYP)
- André-Latour 2001 and 2005 Innovation Prizes (Governor's Foundation/Food Research and Development Centre)
- 2001 Research Partnership Prize of Excellence (Agriculture and Agri-Food Canada)
- VMAC Award of Distinction 2001.

Her work on novel techniques for processing of soy won the 2005 Canadian Agri-Food Award of Excellence for Innovation in Agriculture & Agri-Food.

Boye's research is depicted in the poster gallery created by Ingenium Canada's The Women in STEM initiative. This poster gallery is a collaborative effort between the three Ingenium museums: Canada Agriculture and Food, Canada Aviation and Space, and Canada Science and Technology and their partners to support the engagement, advancement and furtherance of women in STEM.
