= Heather McNairn =

Federal research scientist

- Education: Université Laval
- Scientific career
- Fields: Remote Sensing for Agriculture
- Thesis: Radar response to crop residue cover and tillage application on postharvest agricultural surfaces
- Doctoral advisor: Claude Duguay

Heather McNairn, is a federal research scientist at the Ottawa Research and Development Centre, Agriculture and Agri-Food Canada. She specializes in remote sensing technology, and her research focuses on the use of Synthetic Aperture Radar satellites (SARs) to monitor the condition of crops and soils.

== Biography ==
McNairn received a Bachelor of Environmental Studies from the University of Waterloo, in 1987, a Masters in Soil Science from the University of Guelph, in 1991, and a Ph.D. in Geography from Université Laval in 1999.

== Career ==
McNairn is also an adjunct professor at Carleton University and the University of Manitoba. She has more than 25 years of experience researching methods to monitor crops and soil using multi-spectral, hyperspectral and Synthetic Aperture Radar (SAR) sensors. Throughout her career, she has led numerous national and international research teams and has written over 60 peer-reviewed scientific papers.

McNairn has developed new methods to derive land and soil information, such as land cover, crop residue, tillage, soil moisture, and crop bio-physical characteristics, from Synthetic Aperture Radar satellites. She also specializes in developing pre-processing image analysis approaches using multispectral and hyperspectral sensors. Dr. McNairn led a 3-year research project which developed the methodology to integrate radar and optical satellite data to classify crop types. This method is now used operationally by AAFC to produce a national map of crops, each year.

Her current projects include developing innovative approaches to estimate soil moisture, Leaf Area Index and biomass from SAR sensors. These methods provide temporal and spatial information on soils and crops for use in applications such as flood and drought forecasting, and on farm decision making.

Her research team also worked with industry and the Canadian Space Agency (CSA) to develop a new user-friendly application called the Soil Moisture Toolkit. This Toolkit ingests data from satellites such as the Canadian RADARSAT-2 satellite and generates maps of surface soil moisture. The Toolkit is freely available and is used by remote sensing practitioners around the world.

McNairn collaborates with NASA and the Canadian Space Agency, as well as many Canadian and international research institutions. Dr. McNairn led a Canada-U.S. research effort in 2012 which gathered soil moisture and crop biomass data to assist NASA in calibrating and validating their Soil Moisture Active Passive (SMAP) satellite – a system that provides global maps of soil moisture. This 2012 experiment involved 75 researchers from Canadian and U.S. universities, Environment Canada, the Province of Manitoba, the U.S. Department of Agriculture, the Jet Propulsion Laboratory and NASA. The success of the 2012 campaign led to a request by NASA’s SMAP team to repeat this experiment in 2016. This 2016 data is helping NASA refine soil moisture maps over global sites of annually cropped land.

McNairn is currently collaborating with researchers in The Netherlands, Italy, India and Chile to develop SAR methods to support information requirements for the agriculture sector. In 2016 she was awarded an OECD fellowship and worked for three months in Chile to assist the Instituto de Investigaciones Agropecuraris (INIA) to develop remote sensing tools for use in variable rate irrigation.

McNairn is using data from the RADARSAT Constellation Mission launched in June 2019 to refine her methods to determine crop type, crop health and soil moisture from remote sensing.

McNairn is the co-chair of the Inspire, Develop, Empower, Advance (IDEA) Program, an international leadership initiative. Their mission is to Inspire, Develop, Empower, and Advance (IDEA) members of the Geoscience and Remote Sensing Society (GRSS) and affiliates of accredited societies who are interested in the fields of interest of the GRSS. The committee plans and organizes activities to advance engineers and scientists around the world and to inspire future generations by working with students at all academic levels.

== Honours and awards ==
- 2012 Queen’s Diamond Jubilee medal for her scientific contributions
- 2016 OECD Fellowship from the Co-operative Research Program

== Interests ==
McNairn has a second degree black belt in Karate, and for many years competed in point sparring. In 2009 she won a bronze medal in sparring at the World Karate and Kickboxing Council World Championships in Dublin, Ireland. She has since retired, and is now a certified fitness instructor teaching fitness classes at AAFC, and for the City of Ottawa.
