= Barbara Cade-Menun =

Barbara Cade-Menun is a research scientist with Agriculture and Agri-Food Canada at the Swift Current Research and Development Centre in Saskatchewan. Her research focuses on nutrient cycling and minimizing nutrient loss from agriculture and she is a world leader in studying phosphorus cycling in water, soils, and plants. She is recognized for her pioneering work in the use of 31P nuclear magnetic resonance spectroscopy to characterize phosphorus compounds in soil and other environmental samples. She has developed and refined investigative techniques in her field that have become the preferred standard.

== Biography ==
Cade-Menun grew up in Merrit, British Columbia. She was surrounded by agriculture in her hometown, which inspired her interest from a young age.

In 1986 she obtained her honors B.Sc. in biology from Queen’s University. She then went on to obtain her M.Sc. in soil biology (studying mycorrhizae in winter wheat) in 1989 and Ph.D. in 1995 in soil chemistry (studying phosphorus cycling in temperate rainforests of BC) from the University of British Columbia. She completed her postdoctoral training at the University of California, Berkeley, and Stanford University.

Cade-Menun joined Agriculture and Agri-Food Canada as a research scientist (Swift Current Research and Development Centre) in March 2008. She is an adjunct professor at the University of Saskatchewan, the University of Regina, and the University of Northern British Columbia.

== Career ==
Cade-Menun is a research scientist with Agriculture and Agri-Food Canada and carries out her research at the Swift Current Research and Development Centre, Saskatchewan Structural Sciences Centre, the University of Saskatchewan, and the Canadian Light Source. She is the author or co-author of more than 80 journal papers and book chapters and over 200 conference presentations.

Her research helps minimize the impact of agriculture on the environment. In agriculture phosphorus is supplied to the soil through fertilizer to provide nutrients for crops, but nature has trouble cycling the phosphorus, causing it to accumulate in the soil and water. This can lead to negative environmental impacts such as algal blooms, which can have negative impacts on water sources.

She studies how phosphorus cycles in soil and water using a variety of techniques ranging from simple extractions to advanced spectroscopic methods. She uses methods such as ^{31}P nuclear magnetic resonance spectroscopy (P-NMR) and P k-edge X-ray absorption near-edge structure spectroscopy (P-XANES). These techniques can examine phosphorus forms and concentrations in soils, manure, plants, and snowmelt to help ensure crops are receiving the phosphorus they need while minimizing loss to water. By studying the cycle, researchers can get a complete picture of how phosphorus moves and gain a better understanding of how to manage it more effectively. The goal is to balance what the crop needs to make sure it has just enough, but not too much fertilizer. Although her research has focused on wheat fields, it is being expanded to other crops at sites in Manitoba and Quebec.

Cade-Menun served as an associate editor for the Journal of Environmental Quality (2011–2016) and is currently on the editorial board of Geoderma. She is a member of the Canadian Soil Science Society (CSSS), the Soil Science Society of America (SSSA), and the Association for the Sciences of Limnology and Oceanography (ASLO). In 2016 and 2017 she became a fellow in the SSSA and CSSS respectively. She holds adjunct appointments at the University of Regina, the University of Saskatchewan and the University of Northern British Columbia, and has helped train over 40 high school, undergraduate students, graduate students, post-doctoral fellows, and visiting scientists.

== Honours and awards ==
- Fellow, Canadian Society of Soil Science, 2017
- Fellow, Soil Science Society of America, 2016
- Editor’s Citation for Excellence as associate editor, Journal of Environmental Quality, 2014
- Editor’s Citation for Excellence in Manuscript Review, Journal of Environmental Quality, 2012
- Editor’s Citation, top referee in 2008, Analytica Chimica Acta, 2008
