= Helene Lapierre =

Research scientist for Agriculture and Agri-Food Canada

Helene Lapierre is a research scientist for Agriculture and Agri-Food Canada's Sherbrooke Research and Development Centre. Her research focuses on factors that influence the efficiency of nutrient use in the production of milk and milk components, studying the intermediary metabolism of dairy cows, and improving the transfer of protein from dairy rations into milk protein to lower production costs. Lapierre has reached international recognition by developing new theories and concepts by integrating leading-edge scientific and technical objectives and spreading this knowledge to dairy nutritionists.

== Education ==
Lapierre is from Sherbrooke, Quebec. Lapierre obtained her BSc and MSc in Animal Science from Université Laval, her PhD in Physiology from Université de Sherbrooke, and completed a post-doctorate at the USDA Research Centre in Beltsville, Maryland.

== Career ==
Lapierre is a research scientist of animal metabolism for Agriculture and Agri-Food Canada at the Sherbrooke Research and Development Centre in Sherbrooke, Québec and an adjunct professor in the Department of Animal Science at Université Laval. She joined Agriculture and Agri-Food Canada in 1984 when she started her PhD. Lapierre’s research focuses on studying and better understanding cow metabolism in order to improve efficiency of nitrogen utilization. She determines both supply from the diet and nutrient utilization, such as the utilization of nitrogen, at the whole body and tissue level. In the end, her research helps optimize the formulation of dairy cow feed by reducing protein while maintaining cow health, to help increase revenue and reduce environmental pollutants such as nitrogen. Reducing the cost of feed can save the average farm about $4,000 a year.

== Honours and awards ==
- Canadian Society of Animal Science (CSAS) Award in Excellence in Nutrition and Meat Science (2014)
- American Feed Industry Association Award- The Dairy Nutrition Research Award (2016)
- Award of Merit for Agronomy (2017)
