= Fairfield Poplar =

Heritage poplar tree in Lethbridge, Alberta

Coordinates: 49°58′42″N 112°52′58″W

The Fairfield Poplar

The Fairfield Poplar is a heritage plains cottonwood tree located on the grounds of the Lethbridge Research and Development Centre, in Lethbridge, Alberta, Canada.

The tree was planted in 1906 by the first superintendent of the Dominion Experimental Farm, Dr. William H. Fairfield, as part of a broader effort to populate the surface of the prairie with trees. The tree was hauled up from the river bottom over 6 miles (9.6 km) in a horse and wagon cart by Fairfield and staff. The area around the tree is now known as Fairfield Gardens, and features a variety of mature trees, flower beds, a pavilion shelter, and picnic tables.

In 2008, the tree was recognized by the Heritage Tree Foundation of Alberta as a Heritage Tree.

== See also ==
- List of individual trees
