= G. Clarke Topp =

Canadian soil physicist

G. Clarke Topp is a Canadian soil physicist who spent 37 years with Agriculture and Agri-food Canada, Ottawa. His research focus was to improve field measurement methods for soil-water properties and parameters. His research introduced electromagnetic (EM) technology to soil measurement by way of Time Domain Reflectometry (TDR). Topp is recognized for outstanding technical innovation and scientific achievement.

== Education ==
Topp completed his B.S.A in 1959 at the University of Guelph. He received his M.Sc. in physics in 1962 and his Ph.D. in soil physics from the University of Wisconsin Madison in 1964.

== Career ==
Topp spent 37 years at the Eastern Cereal and Oilseed Research Centre in Ottawa. His focus on improving field measurement methods for soil-water properties and parameters resulted from his introducing the use of electromagnetic (EM) measurements to soil in the late 1970s. From this came Time Domain Reflectometry (TDR), a versatile and powerful technique, for soil-water content measurement. The early development of TDR had an initial lack of support by sponsoring organizations. Despite initial difficulties and lack of support, Topp and his colleagues sustained the research and the development of TDR applications. Many soil properties and processes are influenced strongly by water content, such as, soil strength, root resistance and aeration. A soil strength penetrometer was modified to include TDR capability to measure water content and strength simultaneously. After the success with the penetrometer they added TDR and load cells to a soil sheargraph, to develop a portable soil shear-logger for field use. Development of TDR greatly enhanced the ability to measure the storage and movement of water in the crop root zone and beyond, and contributed substantially to our understanding and exploitation of water content and transfer in soil. Eventually, his collaboration with science colleagues and industrial partners made TDR and other EM techniques the methods of choice for water content, and over 50 of his 130 research papers involve EM techniques including TDR.

Topp held positions as an adjunct professor at Carleton University and the University of Guelph, and as a visiting lecturer at Carleton University and University of Saskatchewan. He also served as a visiting soil science consultant on soil-water methods for the Canadian International Development Agency (CIDA) projects in India, Pakistan, and Brazil.

== Awards and achievements ==
- Innovator 2000 Award for outstanding technical innovation on TDR, Federal Partners Tech. Transfer, Ottawa
- 1997 Applied Soil Research Award presented by Soil Science Society of America
- Co-Editor – Methods of Soil Analysis Part 4 Physical Methods, SSSA Book Series No. 5, Soil Sci. Soc. Amer., Madison, WI
- Advisor to Small Business Innovations Research Program of U.S. Department of Agriculture, Washington, USA
- Advisory Panel for Environmental Research Facility at CFB Borden in regard to environmental risks associated with the University of Waterloo, Centre for Groundwater Research program at CFB Borden
- Member of the Canadian Society of Soil Science – CSSS Fellow 1988 and member of the Soil Science Society of America – SSSA Fellow 1990
- Soil water section co-editor and author or co-author of nine chapter in “Soil Sampling & Methods of Analysis, 2nd Edition”. Edited by M.R. Carter & E.G. Gregorich for Canadian Society of Soil Science with CRC Press. 2007
