= Karen Schwartzkopf-Genswein =

Canadian federal scientist

Karen Schwartzkopf-Genswein is a Canadian federal scientist with expertise in farm animal behaviour, health, and welfare. She works for Agriculture and Agri-Food Canada at the Lethbridge Research and Development Centre. She is known for her foundational research on assessing welfare in beef cattle including the impacts of long-distance transportation, developing producer-friendly pain mitigation strategies for castration and other painful procedures, and assessing and mitigating lameness in feedlot cattle that has informed regulations and guidelines for the commercial beef cattle industry in North America. Her research results and expertise have guided the industry and led to updated Canadian Transport Regulations and Canadian Beef Codes of Practice. In addition to her research, Schwartzkopf-Genswein provides training and consultation on livestock farming practices.

== Biography ==
Schwartzkopf-Genswein grew up on a farm in southern Alberta that has been active in the beef cattle feedlot business for over 40 years. Her life on the family farm and early exposure to livestock contributed to her interest in understanding cattle behaviour and their care. Her pursuit to learn more resulted in Schwartzkopf-Genswein obtaining a BSc in biology from the University of Lethbridge (1986), a MSc in zoology/ethology at the University of Regina, and a PhD in applied animal ethology at the University of Saskatchewan (1996).

== Career ==
Prior to joining Agriculture and Agri-Food Canada in 2003, Schwartzkopf-Genswein worked as a research scientist for Alberta Agriculture, Food and Rural Development in Lethbridge (1999–2002). She is recognized as an expert technical advisor on issues related to beef cattle behaviour and welfare and called upon to speak at scientific and industry conferences in North America and around the world. Since 2009, Schwartzkopf-Genswein has served on 29 expert panels and advisory committees all focused on advancing knowledge and understanding of farm animal behaviour, health, and welfare. She has more than 70 peer-reviewed publications.

Schwartzkopf-Genswein is an adjunct professor at the University of Saskatchewan, University of Calgary, University of Manitoba, and UNESP University in Sao Paulo, Brazil.

== Honours and awards ==
- 2004 to 2011 - Associate Editor for the Canadian Journal of Animal Science
- 2009 to 2010 - President of the Canadian Society of Animal Science
- 2010 to 2011 - Past-President of the Canadian Society of Animal Science (Executive Nominations Coordinator)
- Award of Distinction in Innovation from the Alberta Farm Animal Care Association nominated by the Alberta Beef Producers (March 25, 2013, Calgary, Alberta)
- Canadian Animal Industries Award in Extension and Public Service from the Canadian Society of Animal Science (May 20, 2015, Ottawa, Ontario)
- 2017 Canadian Beef Industry Award for Outstanding Research and Innovation
- 2017 Award for Technical Innovation in Enhancing Production of Safe Affordable Food, Canadian Society of Animal Science
- 2022 Metacam 20 Bovine Welfare Award Winner
