= Elizabeth Pattey =

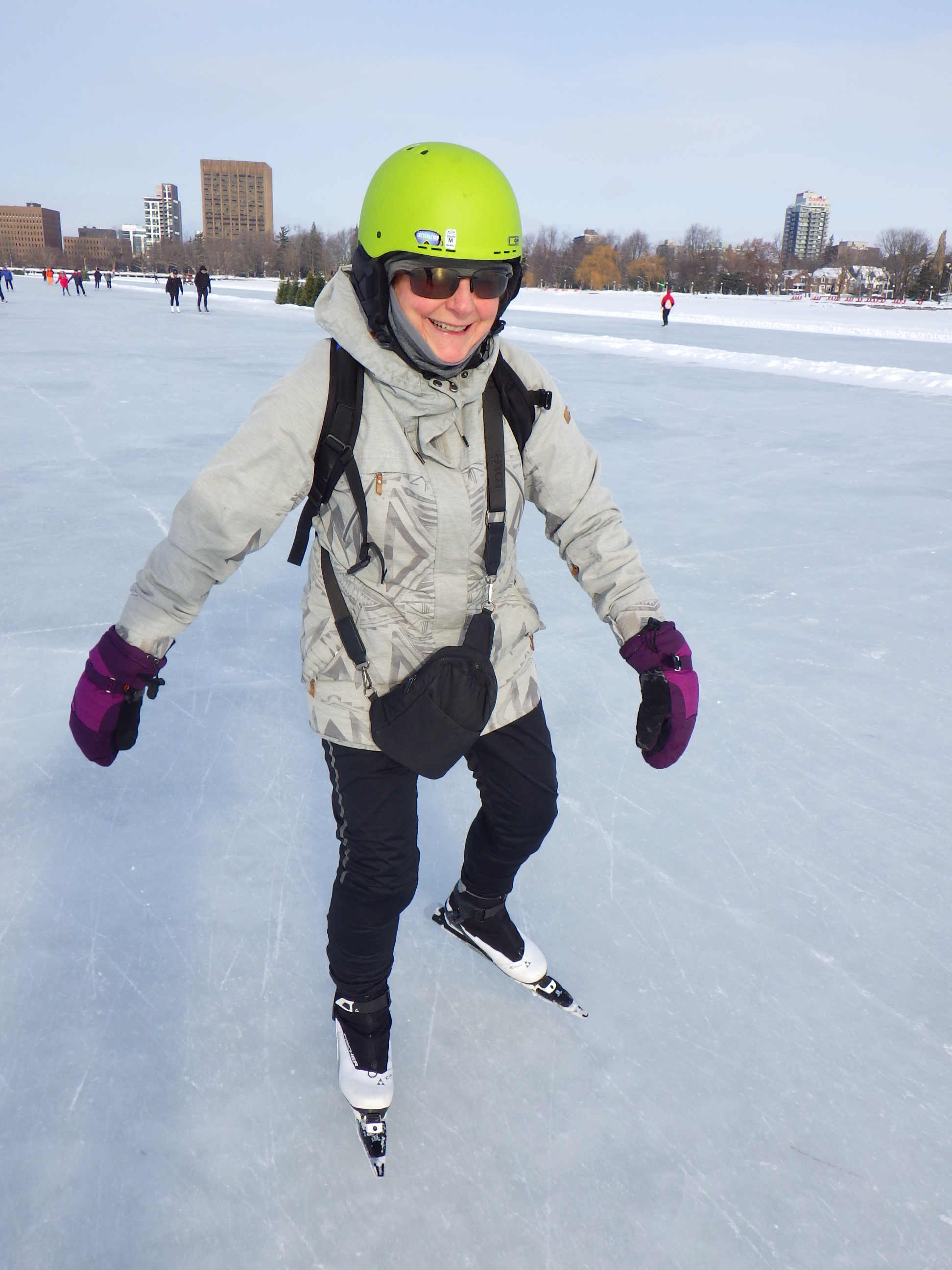
- Elizabeth Pattey skating on the Rideau Canal in 2026
- Born: France
- Citizenship: Canadian
- Occupation: senior research scientist

Elizabeth Pattey is a retired Canadian scientist. She was principal research scientist at Agriculture and Agri-Food Canada (AAFC) and the leader of the micrometeorology laboratory at the Ottawa Research and Development Centre. Her research supports nationwide improvement in the environmental performance of agriculture, in support of the United Nations' Framework Convention on Climate Change and Canada’s Clean Air Act. She is the co-author for over 80 peer-reviewed scientific publications, and her areas of expertise include trace gas flux measurement techniques, process-based models, and remote-sensing applications.

== Biography ==
Pattey has served as adjunct professor at the Macdonald Campus of McGill University, and was an external examiner for numerous Ph.D. theses in Canada and internationally.

She currently works as a research scientist in micrometeorology at AAFC in Ottawa and has led several major remote sensing initiatives, including the first project funded by the Canadian Space Agency at AAFC. She has represented AAFC at the Interdepartmental Committee on Space and the Canadian Embassy Science and Technology advisors, and to numerous other organizations.

== Career ==
Her current research focuses on developing and improving trace gas flux measurement techniques to quantify greenhouse gas emissions (particularly N_{2}O, CH_{4}, and CO_{2}) and other airborne contaminants, such as ammonia and particulate matter. She did pioneer work on the relaxed eddy accumulation technique to measure trace gas fluxes. She has contributed to international efforts for verifying process-based models for greenhouse gas emissions and ammonia volatilization from agricultural sources, and for assimilating biophysical descriptors using remote sensing data in soil and crop growth models. In her research, she evaluates the impact of beneficial management practices on air quality and the impact of climate variations on the sustainability of crop production. In other current projects, she quantified crop growth and biomass in response to weather and soil conditions using remote sensing, micrometeorology, and modelling techniques, and she quantified greenhouse gas emissions from agricultural practices at the field-, farm-, and regional-scales using micrometeorological techniques and laser instrumentation. She also developed biophysical descriptors and procedures for assimilating remote-sensing data to derive yield estimates and determine site-specific agricultural management practices. She was an active participant in The Boreal Ecosystem – Atmosphere Study (BOREAS), and she measured the fluxes of carbon dioxide, methane, and isoprene in the Southern Old Black Spruce site in Saskatchewan.

== GreenCropTracker ==
Along with Jiangui Liu, Pattey developed GreenCropTracker (https://www.flintbox.com/public/project/5470/), a tool to help create better models for simulating crop growth and obtaining physical descriptors of agricultural crops. GreenCropTracker is a software tool that can be used to derive crop information from a simple digital photo taken over a crop canopy in agricultural fields. The resulting model predictions help growers understand what happens in the field so they can manage production more efficiently. Pattey and Liu thought that a time series of photos taken over a crop canopy for documenting the growth advancement would contain quantitative information that could be evaluated. They developed a histogram-based threshold method to differentiate gaps from plant tissues and then incorporated this image analysis method into GreenCropTracker. GreenCropTracker can be used to study crop production in experimental plots and fields to evaluate the impact of climate variation on crops and to provide ground data for deriving crop descriptors from remote sensing data. It also verifies the output of crop growth models and integrates surface conditions with regional meteorological models. The software, which has already been tested over corn, wheat, and soybean crops, is used by the Food and Agriculture Organization of the United Nations and has been requested by nearly 50 countries because it provides fast and inexpensive crop information.

== Affiliations ==
- Chair of the Board on Atmospheric Biogeosciences of the American Meteorological Society (2010-2015)
- Expert for the Commission for Agricultural Meteorology of World Meteorological Organization (WMO)
- Scientific steering committee of CarboNA
- Agricultural Institute of Canada
- American Geophysical Union
- American Society of Agronomy
- Canadian Meteorological and Oceanographic Society
- Canadian Remote Sensing Society
- Remote Sensing Society of Quebec
- Adjunct professor, department of natural resource sciences, McGill University (2002-2009)
- President (-elect and past-) of the Canadian Society of Agricultural and Forest Meteorology (2004-2006)
- Editorial board of Agricultural and Forest Meteorology since 2012.

== Honours and awards ==
Pattey was elected a Fellow of the Canadian Society of Agricultural and Forest Meteorology (CSAFM) for her lifetime contributions to agricultural and forest meteorology, she was a recipient of the Gerbier Mumm International Award for scientific excellence, WMO, in 2002 and of Graham Walker Memorial Award for excellence in Agrometeorology, CSAM, in 1997. She was nominated Chair of Task Team on Flux Measurement in Agriculture for the World Meteorological Organization – Commission of AgroMeteorology (WMO CAgM). In 2018, Pattey was awarded the Andrew Thomson Prize in Applied Meteorology from the Canadian Meteorological and Oceanographic Society. This was for her long-standing leadership and significant contributions to agricultural meteorology. She was also awarded the Award for Outstanding Achievement in Biometeorology in 2020, from the American Meteorological Society. This was for pioneering the development of systems that measure surface layer turbulence and the nocturnal boundary layer to quantify particulate matter and trace gas fluxes.
