= Lethbridge Research and Development Centre =

Research centre in Alberta, Canada

- Main facade of the Lethbridge Research and Development Centre

- Location within Canada

General information
- Location: Alberta, Canada, Canada
- Coordinates: 49°41′58″N 112°47′0″W
- Opened: 1906
- Owner: Government of Canada

The Lethbridge Research and Development Centre (LRDC) is one of the largest facilities within Agriculture and Agri-Food Canada's national network of 20 research centres across Canada.

The LRDC has over 400 staff and operates on 1,285 acres (520 ha; 2.008 sq mi) of arable land in Lethbridge and around Southern Alberta. Its research programs address a variety of agricultural challenges, but primarily focus on competitive and sustainable farming practices, including beef cattle production systems and dry-land crop production.

== History ==
In 1900, the Canadian North West Irrigation Company established a model farm to demonstrate best practices for farming under irrigated conditions and to encourage settlement in the area. The model farm was re-established as a Dominion Experimental Station in 1906 by the federal government with Dr. William H. Fairfield appointed as the first superintendent.

The Centre made national headlines in 2015 when it's scientific library was closed as a part of federal government cutbacks and thousands of documents were discarded in a dumpster outside the main building.

== Satellite operations ==
Vauxhall Research Farm (1961–present)
Onefour Research Farm (1958–2013)

== Fairfield Gardens ==
Fairfield Gardens

Located on the grounds of the research centre, the gardens feature a pavilion shelter, picnic tables, a variety of colourful flower beds, and mature trees, including the 120-year-old, heritage-listed Fairfield Poplar.

The gardens are run by the volunteer organization Friends of the Fairfield Gardens, which is made up of staff of the research centre.

== People ==
- Karen Beauchemin
- Karen Schwartzkopf-Genswein
