= Vernon Burrows =

Canadian agricultural scientist

Vernon Douglas Burrows OC was a research scientist at Agriculture and Agri-Food Canada (AAFC) and an international authority on oat breeding and utilization. He bred and registered 28 varieties of oats, including AC Gehl, the “naked oat,” which is hulless and hairless and therefore easier to process and transport. In 2001 Burrows was appointed as Member of the Order of Canada, and in 2018 he was promoted to Officer of the Order of Canada for his research that has enhanced the production and nutritional value of oat-based foods.

== Biography ==
Burrows was born in 1930 in Winnipeg, Manitoba. Inspired by his grandfather, Burrows decided to pursue a career in plant science.

Burrows obtained a BSA from the University of Manitoba in 1951, an MSc from the University of Manitoba in 1953, and a PhD from the California Institute of Technology in 1958. In 1958, he began working as a plant physiologist at what was then Agriculture Canada, now Agriculture and Agri-Foods Canada (AAFC), in the Eastern Cereal and Oilseed Research Centre in Ottawa. He became an oat breeder in 1969, developing and licensing many varieties of oats. Of note is the variety Foothill, Canada's first dual-purpose grain and forage oat; Hinoat, the first high-protein oat released for human consumption; and Donald, the first variety that can grow during shorter day lengths.

In 1985 Burrows released Tibor, a variety of hulless oat that was also highly nutritious. The lack of a hull on the grain means the oats take up less space and are therefore more efficient and less expensive to store and transport. Tibor had high potential of being a nutritious feed for poultry and swine. Its energy content was similar to corn and its protein content was high enough to reduce greatly or eliminate the need for a supplemental soybean meal.

After more than 15 years of intensive research and breeding, Burrows and his team developed and registered AC Gehl, the first truly hulless and hairless oat variety in the world. Earlier hulless varieties were still covered with tiny hairs called trichomes that blow off during threshing and handling, creating respiratory problems and skin irritation for workers. AC Gehl is therefore easier to process, and its natural waxy coating protects the crop in the field and during storage. AC Gehl grows well under many conditions and the oat is highly nutritious.

Over the years, Burrows made many contributions to the oat scientific literature and to the development of genetic stocks for specific traits.

In addition to his accomplished research career, Burrows was also adjunct professor, McGill University, Montreal, where has served with distinction for many years on a variety of Canadian Expert Committees responsible for improving oats for food, animal feed, and industrial uses.

Burrows retired in 1997 but remained active in research at AAFC and in volunteer work to promote oats, particularly hulless varieties. He died peacefully in hospital on November 8, 2020.

== Career ==
Burrows bred and registered 28 varieties of oat, combining as many favourable traits as possible and developing oats that meet specific industry and nutritional needs.

=== AC Gehl, the “Naked Oat” ===
Developed by Burrows, AC Gehl received much scientific and commercial attention in Canada. It was marketed as “Rice of the Prairies” by the company Wedge Farms Nutrition, Manitoba, (now Smart & Natural Foods) which commercially introduced the product in early 2009. The other name used on the packaging is Cavena Nuda. “Cavena” is short for Canadian avena (the Latin word for oats) and “Nuda” for naked, which signifies the hulless trait.

AC Gehl has a similar taste to rice, but it has twice the protein, high antioxidant content, and a low glycemic index. This oat was featured at an AAFC Savour Canada event at the 2010 Winter Olympics in Vancouver, and was served to world leaders at the G-20 Summit in Toronto in summer 2010.

In 2011, the Campbell Company of Canada began using AC Gehl oats in their canned soup product “Nourish,” which they developed and donated to food banks in Canada and around the world to address the growing issue of hunger.

Since 2013, Burrows provided mentorship to Dr. Will Spencer of rND Bakery to develop gluten-free oat bagels using AC Gehl. With a mission to improve gut health, this Smiths Falls-based bakery has been expanding its oat bagel sales.

AC Gehl is also licensed to Semican International of Quebec, which uses the oats in their nutrition bar for racehorses.

AC Gehl was well received in China, where it grows well on a variety of soil types, including saline soils. China has millions of hectares of saline soils that are not in use, and AC Gehl could improve food production and availability there.

=== Science ambassador for Canada and champion of oats ===
Burrows shared his expertise with fellow researchers from Canada and abroad, and he is recognized for his substantial contribution to Canada and Canadian agriculture.

Burrows volunteered internationally for many years, particularly in China, sharing his knowledge and oat specimens. In 2003, he received the Chinese Friendship Award (also known as China's Certificate of Friendship), the highest honour bestowed upon a foreigner, for his volunteer service and role in opening up new opportunities for Chinese farmers. On June 18, 2012, at a research centre in Baicheng, a city in the northern province of Jilin, China, a bronze statue of Burrows was unveiled to honour him for his oat science work. On February 25, 2016, Burrows was awarded The 2014 International Scientific and Technological Cooperation Award of the People's Republic of China at a presentation in Ottawa. This award was established by China's State Council.

Burrows was instrumental in promoting the importance of oat dietary fibre in the control of high cholesterol. He was also active in the celiac community and contributed knowledge to the development of a system of field inspections and lab tests to ensure that growers can make uncontaminated, gluten-free oats using the AC Gehl variety.

== Honours and awards ==
- 1975 Grindley Medal, Agricultural Institute of Canada
- 1994 Distinguished Service Oat Improvement Award, American Oat Workers Conference
- 1986 Honorary Life Member, Canadian Seed Growers Association
- 1997 Appointed Research Scientist Emeritus by the Minister of Agriculture
- 2000 AAFC Agcellence Award in the Innovation category
- 2001 Member of the Professional Advisory Board, Canadian Celiac Association
- 2001 Member of the Order of Canada
- 2002 Fellow of the Agricultural Institute of Canada
- 2003 Chinese Friendship Award for volunteer service directed to the improvement of oats in China
- 2007 Award of Excellence for Voluntarism, Canadian Agri-Food Award of Excellence
- 2010 AAFC Research Branch Science Achievement Award, Outstanding Accomplishments in the Field of Oat Utilization
- 2014 International Scientific and Technological Cooperation Award of the People's Republic of China
- 2015 Canadian Science and Engineering Hall of Fame
- 2016 Canadian Celiac Association - Life Member - For leading the process to bring gluten-free oats to market for people with celiac disease.
- 2018 Officer of the Order of Canada
