= Constantine Campbell =

Canadian scientist (1934–2022)

Constantine Alberga Campbell (January 18, 1934 – November 27, 2022) was a Canadian scientist who was a researcher in soil organic matter and all features of nitrogen in soils and crops. Campbell is the leading authority on soil fertility and degradation of nitrogen in American prairie soil, which includes the amount of loss on the quality of organic matter. He was one of the first to radiocarbon date soil organic matter, and in 1967 published a paper which is cited as a landmark work. The majority of his career, he worked with Agriculture and Agri-Food Canada in Swift Current, Saskatchewan, retiring in 1998.

== Biography ==
Campbell was born in Jamaica on January 18, 1934. He spent his high school years at Cornwall College, located in Montego Bay, Jamaica. He moved to Canada in 1955 at the age of 21 and studied at the Ontario Agricultural College. He earned his degrees in Agricultural Chemistry (1960) and MSA in Soil Science (1961). He then obtained his PhD from the University of Saskatchewan (1965) in Soil Sciences where he then worked as a research scientist for over 25 years at the Swift Current Agriculture Canada Research Centre. He headed the Soils and Environment section. He was the program leader for the Soil Management and Conservation program at the research centre. During this time, he also worked as an adjunct professor in soil science at the University of Saskatchewan.

After retiring in 1998, he acted as a Consultant in Soil and Environmental Sciences and has continued to conduct research as an Honorary Research Associate at Eastern Cereal & Oilseed Research Centre (ECORC).

Campbell is responsible for establishing a cricket team and developing a first-class cricket ground in Swift Current, Canada, where he worked as a scientist. He was also responsible for acquiring sufficient funds to revive the cricket program at his alma mater, Cornwall College in Jamaica. Because of his contributions to the sport of cricket in Jamaica and Canada, Campbell was inducted into the Cricket Hall of Fame in 2006.

Campbell died in Ottawa on November 27, 2022, at the age of 88.

== Career ==
Campbell's main interest included soil research relating to dry-land farming in the Canadian prairies where he demonstrated ways to reverse degradation. He has 260 publications including numerous articles and books. His findings have benefitted the farming industry in the Canadian prairies by increasing its productivity and sustainability. He was one of the first to successfully radiocarbon date soil organic matter, which resulted in him publishing a ground breaking paper (1967). Campbell's research and work has garnered attention nationally and internationally where his work is used in development and testing of plant growth models. His demonstration of Carbon dating showed how the C-dating technique could help measure the dynamics of soil organic matter turnover. He helped develop the model used today to quantify the sequestration of carbon in soils.

In 1978, he was promoted to senior research scientist. He served as leader of the soil management conservation program and as the head, soils and environment section for Agriculture Canada (1975 - 1990). He was a visiting scientist with CSIRO in Queensland, Australia (1978–1979) as well as an adjunct professor at the University of Saskatchewan (1978–1995). Campbell moved to Ottawa in 1997 where he worked at the Agriculture Canada Central Experimental Farm, before retiring in 1998.

== Awards and recognition ==
- Agronomy Merit Award, Wheat Pools of the Prairie Provinces & Western Co-op Fertilizers (1986)
- Fellow, Canadian Society of Soil Science (1988)
- Fellow, Agriculture Institute of Canada (1988)
- Distinguished Agrologist Award, Saskatchewan Institute of Agrologists (1990)
- Outstanding Research Award, Canadian Society of Agronomy (1991)
- Fellow, American Society of Agronomy (1993)
- Fellow, Soil Science Society of America (1993)
- Distinguished Service Award, Saskatchewan Institute of Agrologists (1997)
- Foundation founded in his honour for University of Saskatchewan students to train in soil sciences at Swift Current (1997)
- Member, Order of Canada, 1998
- Appointed Scientist Emeritus, Agriculture & Agri-Food Canada (1998)
- Saskatchewan Order of Merit (1998)
- Inducted into Saskatchewan Agriculture Hall of Fame (1999)
- Queen's Golden Jubilee Medal (2002)
- Saskatchewan Centennial Medal (2005)
- Inclusion in Who’s Who in Black Canada 2 (2006)
- Inducted into the Cricket Hall of Fame, Hartford Connecticut (2006)
- Recognized for service to his alma mater by Cornwall College Old Boys Association (2008)
