= Guy Lafond =

Canadian agricultural researcher (1953–2013)

Guy Lafond was a research scientist for over 30 years with Agriculture and Agri-Food Canada at the Indian Head Research Farm in Saskatchewan. He was instrumental in establishing the Indian Head Agricultural Research Foundation (IHARF) in the early 1990s and had a major impact on cropping practices and soil conservation.

== Early life and education ==
Lafond grew up in St. Jean Baptiste, Manitoba, and obtained his bachelor's and master’s degrees from the University of Manitoba. He then obtained his Ph.D. from the University of Saskatchewan and worked at their Crop Development Centre in 1984 before settling his family at Agriculture Canada’s research farm in Indian Head. After working with Agriculture and Agri-Food Canada for over 30 years, he died in April 2013 in Regina, Saskatchewan, after battling cancer.

== Career ==
Lafond began his career with Agriculture and Agri-Food Canada in 1985, where he provided strong leadership and conducted research aimed at soil conservation and sustainable agriculture practices. His career started during the no-till farming revolution, which he had closely tracked ever since. His areas of research at the Indian Head Research Farm included agronomy of no-till, cropping systems, precision farming, cereal, oilseed and pulse production, soil, fertilizer, and land management.

Lafond changed the face of agriculture in Western Canada with his pioneering research in no-till farming and contributions to the adoption of direct seeding. He was one of the most distinguished conservation researchers in Canada and shared his knowledge with researchers and producers around the world, including in the United States, China, Russia, Ukraine, Kazakhstan, Australia, and across Europe. In Canada and internationally, many profited from his expertise and tireless unbiased research.

Lafond’s research in precision agriculture helped farmers change how they work and learn new information about their land. With GPS technology and earth observation satellites, farmers can acquire insightful data on soil and crop health, and farm machinery is able to have navigational abilities and auto-steering. This information and technology from precision agriculture can help farmers tailor their practices to maximize yield and sustainability by applying seed, fertilizer, and pesticides in the right amounts, at the right time in the right place.

In the early 1990s, Lafond played a leading role in establishing the Indian Head Agricultural Research Foundation (IHARF) that continues to conduct applied research for farmers. IHARF is a non-profit organization that aims to promote sustainable and profitable agriculture and benefit the agricultural community by facilitating research and technology transfer activities. It is widely recognized as an innovative leader in public-good research.

== Awards and achievements ==
- Manitoba-North Dakota Zero Tillage Associate Award of Outstanding contribution to the development of zero-till and direct seeding
- The Weed Science Society of America Award of Excellence
- Saskatchewan Soil Conservation Association Award of Merit
- Canadian Society of Agronomy Distinguished Agrologist
- Fellow of the Canadian Society of Agronomy
- Diamond jubilee recipient
- Honoured posthumously (March 2014) for his lifetime achievement and leadership in no-till development and agronomy research with an induction into the Canadian Conservation Hall of Fame in Ottawa
