= Saqvaqjuac =

Arctic research camp

Location of Saqvaqjuac in Nunavut

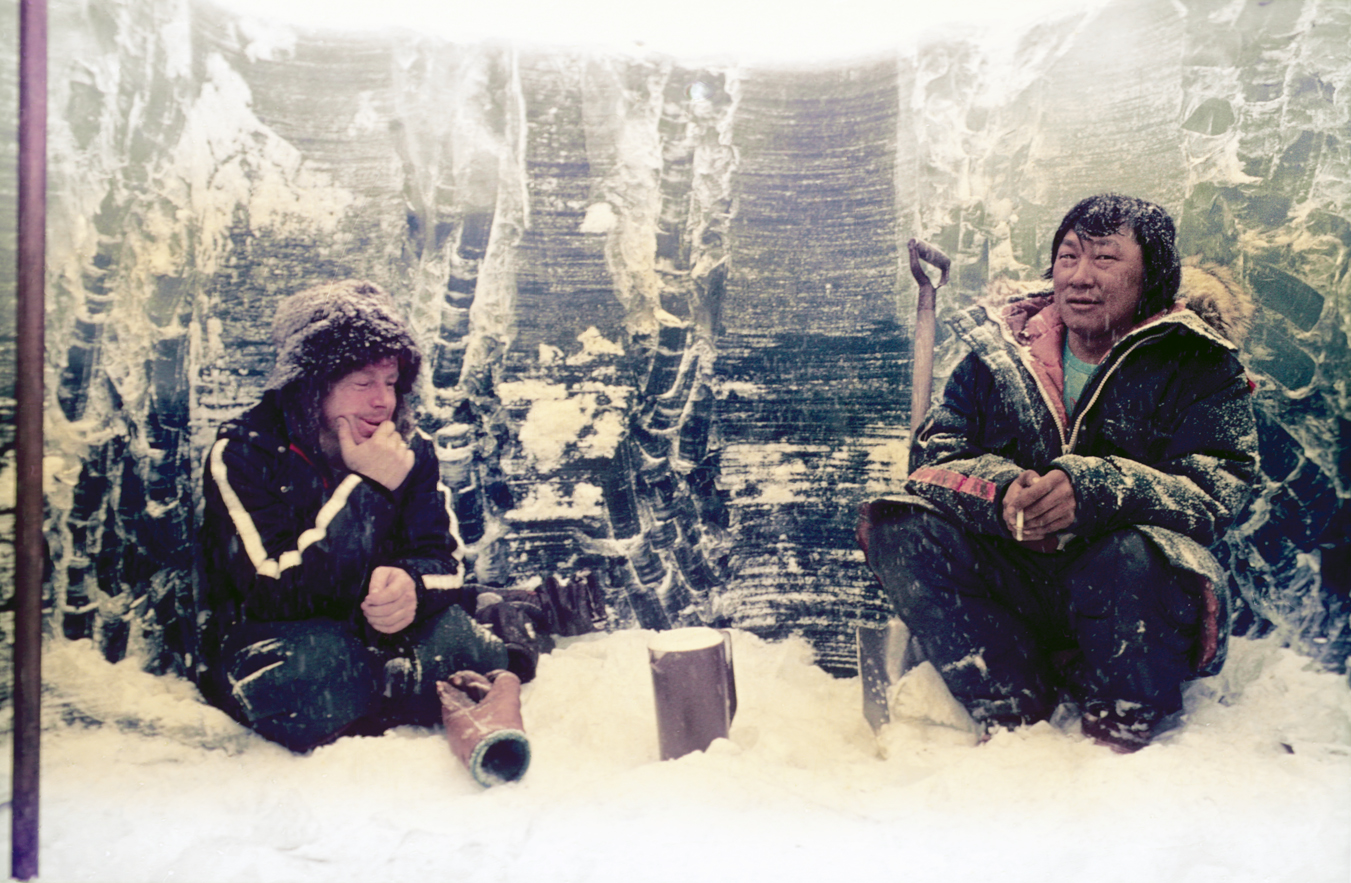
Early January 1978, cutting hole through first year lake ice for methane addition apparatus.

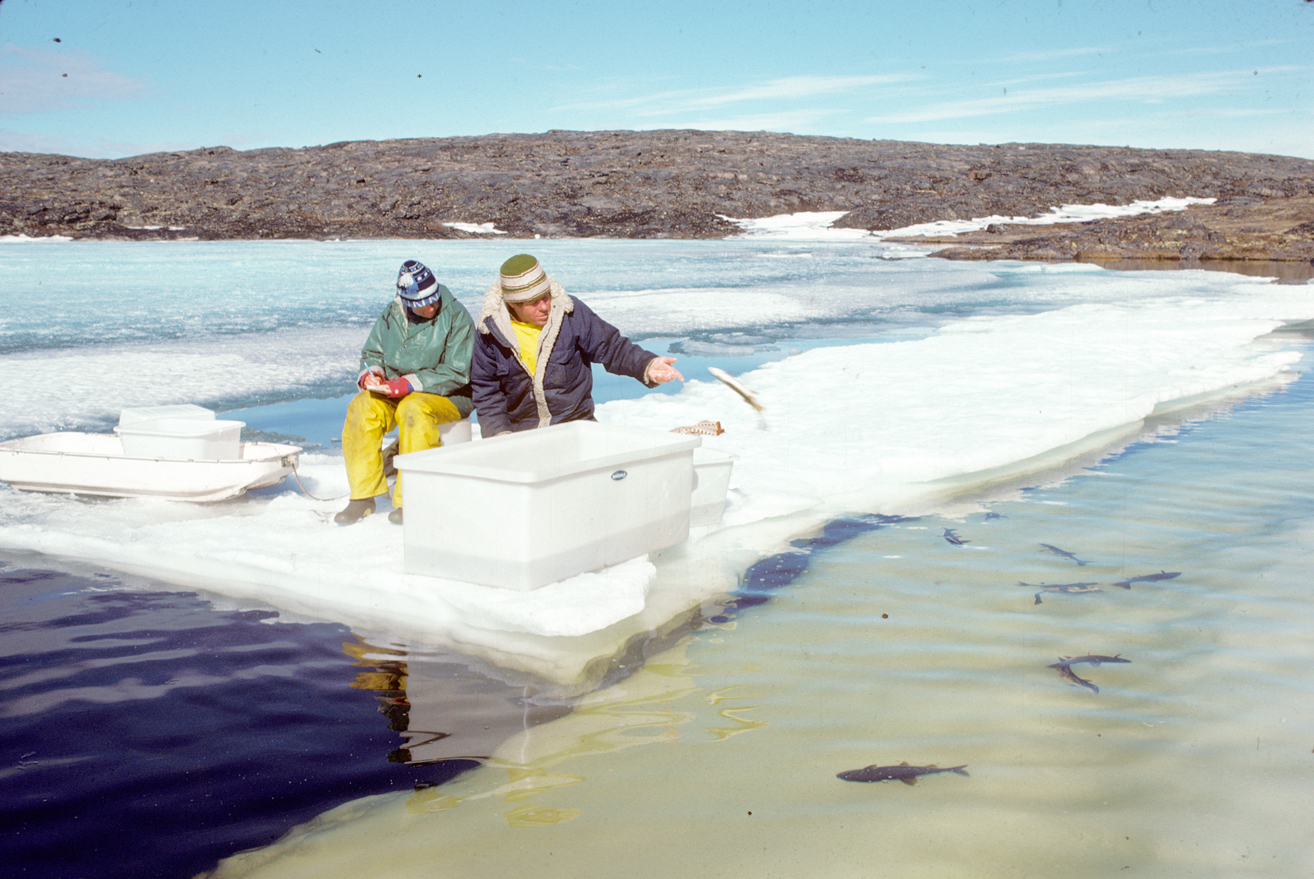
July 1st, 1978 - marking fish for recapture study, Saqvaqjuac. 314 lake trout marked that day in 7-hectare Spring Lake.

Saqvaqjuac was a 465 m^{2} Arctic research camp located on the north side of Chesterfield Inlet, Kivalliq Region, Nunavut, Canada, 35 kilometres (22 mi) north-northwest of the hamlet of Igluligaarjuk (Chesterfield Inlet). It was opened in 1977, operated every year until 1982, and last used in 1988. The name is attributed to the fast-moving water connecting the inlet with Hudson Bay (saqvaq meaning "fast water or rapids" and juac meaning "big" or "large").

== Research Activities ==
The original purpose of the station was for conducting research on freshwater systems and potentially for collecting data to guide industrial projects in the central eastern Arctic. Research subjects included whole-lake methane addition, phosphorus and nitrogen eutrophication experiments, long-range atmospheric transport and photosynthesis of ice algae. Other topics included detailed bathymetric and topographic surveys, and collection of other hydrometeorological data.

The project was operated by the Freshwater Institute, part of Fisheries and Oceans Canada.
