= Charlottetown Research and Development Centre =

Research facility

Coordinates: 46°14′54″N 63°08′09″W

Charlottetown Research and Development Centre is a research facility that falls under the Agriculture and Agri-Food Canada umbrella. The centre was founded in 1909 and focuses on research to enhance environmentally sustainable crop production systems of the Atlantic regions.

== Recent research ==
=== Rosehip Production ===
A rosehip variety called AAC Sylvia-Arlene was development at the research centre which was aimed at producing a higher antioxidant than normal. The AAC Sylvia Arlene is intended for commercial hips production in the Maritime and cooling growing regions.

=== Critical Phosphorus Concentration in Wheat ===
A model of critical phosphorus concentration in the shoot biomass of wheat was conducted in order to assess the level of crop nutrition. The objectives were to help validate an existing model (Pc = 0.94 + 0.107N) in the shoot biomass.

=== Nitrogen Groundwater Reduction Planning ===
A new model was developed to gauge the nitrogen load in estuaries. The tests were conducted using LEACHN simulations and GIS based land data, this method proved to be successful in gauging the nutrient flow in the surrounded groundwater.

== Location ==
The centre is located on 440 University Avenue in downtown Charlottetown. It also operates a research farm in Harrington, PEI.
