= Osmotic dehydration =

Process for partially removing water from a substance

Osmotic dehydration is an operation used for the partial removal of water from plant tissues by immersion in a hypertonic (osmotic) solution.

Sugar or salt solutions are used to reduce the moisture content of foods before actual drying process. This technique is used to give the product quality improvement over conventional drying process. Mild heat treatment after osmotic dehydration favours colour and flavour retention resulting in the product having superior organoleptic characteristics. It also increases resistance to heat treatment, prevents enzymatic browning and inhibits activities of polyphenol oxidase. The process is economical.

Osmotic dehydration depends on:

- Temperature of osmotic solution.
- Concentration of the osmotic solution.
- Osmotic agent used.
- Process duration.
- Geometry of food material.

== Process ==
Water removal is based on the natural and non-destructive phenomenon of osmosis across cell membranes. The driving force for the diffusion of water from the tissue into the solution is provided by the higher osmotic pressure of the hyper-tonic solution. The diffusion of water is accompanied by the simultaneous counter diffusion of solutes from the osmotic solution into the tissue. Since the cell membrane responsible for osmotic transport is not perfectly selective, solutes present in the cells (organic acids, reducing sugars, minerals, flavors and pigment compounds) can also be leaked into the osmotic solution, which affects the organoleptic and nutritional characteristics of the product.

The rate of diffusion of water from any material made up of such tissues depends upon factors such as temperature and concentration of the osmotic solution, the size and geometry of the material, the solution-to-material mass ratio and, to a certain level, agitation of the solution.
