= Farm Credit Canada =

Canadian agricultural term lending crown corporation

- Type: Crown Corporation
- Industry: Financial services
- Predecessor: Canadian Farm Loan Board
- Founded: 1959; 67 years ago
- Headquarters: Regina, Saskatchewan, Canada
- Number of employees: 2,200 (2023)
- Website: fcc-fac.ca

Farm Credit Canada (FCC, French: Financement agricole Canada; known as Farm Credit Corporation until 2001) is a Canadian Crown corporation and agricultural term lender.

This organization's purpose is to enhance rural Canada by providing specialized and personalized financial services to farming operations, including family farms. Although once exclusively a farm lender, FCC is now also organized to provide funding to enterprises that are closely related or dependent on farming. Its small and medium business focus is shown by its average loan disbursement of $163,649 (As of March 2014).

== History and governance ==
FCC was established on November 12, 1936, under the Farm Credit Act, at that time solely to provide loans to farmers. It succeeded the Canadian Farm Loan Board, which had been in operation since 1929.

On April 2, 1993, Parliament passed the Farm Credit Corporation Act which then allowed the organization to expand beyond straightforward farm loans – to finance on-farm diversification projects and value-added agricultural operations beyond the "farm gate". In June 2001, the Farm Credit Canada Act changed FCC's name to Farm Credit Canada or Financement agricole Canada (FAC) in French.

In October 2008, Farm Credit Canada was named one of Canada's Top 100 Employers by Mediacorp Canada Inc, and was featured in the magazine Maclean's. Later that month, Farm Credit Canada was named one of Saskatchewan's Top Employers, which was announced by the Saskatoon StarPhoenix and Regina Leader-Post newspapers.

In December 2008, Farm Credit Canada was named one of Report on Business Magazine's Top 50 Employers in Canada featured in The Globe and Mail newspaper.

== Structure and functions ==
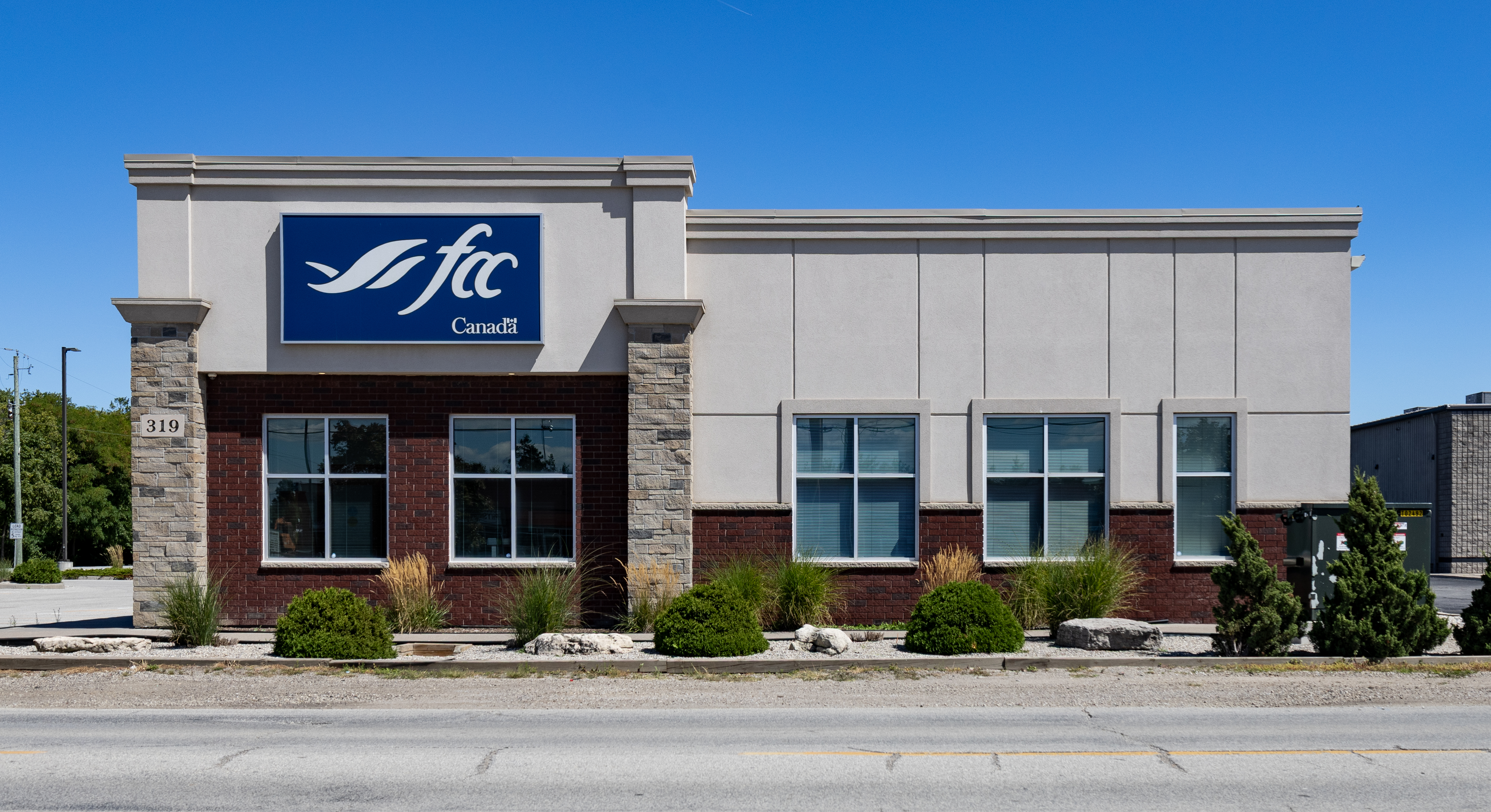
Farm Credit Canada branch in Essex, Ontario, the seat of Essex County

FCC is one of Canada's many Crown corporations; they report to the Parliament of Canada through the Minister of Agriculture and Agri-Food. The corporation's board consists of up to 12 members, all appointed choices that require the approval of the governor-in-council. This control board regularly meets in the corporation's head office, which is located in Regina, Saskatchewan. FCC has over 2200 employees, and six regional offices and more than 100 field and district offices across the country, primarily in rural Canada (as of March 2014).

FCC can fund and deliver joint programs and services with federal agencies, provincial governments and other term lenders. FCC’s operations are funded primarily through FCC Bond offerings, structured notes, institutional short-term notes, long-term programs and institutional debt. It raises money on the domestic and international markets.

The product portfolio for FCC includes a variety of intermediate and long-term loans, with amortization periods as long as 29 years. As of March 2014, the corporation had a loan portfolio of 149,130 loans, with a total value of $26,205 million. As per the FCC annual report 2019-20, the total value of the corporation's loan portfolio is $38.6 billion.
