= Till & McCulloch =

Canadian research group

Working together, biologists James Till and Ernest McCulloch made contributions to stem cell research by demonstrating the existence of multipotent stem cells in 1961. They helped lay the foundation for modern stem cell biology and regenerative medicine through their work while studying the effects of radiation on the bone marrow of mice at the Ontario Cancer Institute in Toronto.

== Collaboration ==
Till & McCulloch first published their findings of the discovery of stem cells in the journal Radiation Research. In later work, joined by graduate student Andy Becker, they cemented their stem cell theory and published the results in the journal Nature in 1963.

Till & McCulloch then expanded their research activities and mentored other young scientists, some notable. Scientists that were under the direct supervision of Till or McCulloch were members of their research group, or were co-authors of papers, including the following:

- Louis Siminovitch
- Tak Mak
- Alan Bernstein
- Connie Eaves
- Victor Ling

Both Till & McCulloch continued their research.

Till's focus shifted increasingly towards the evaluation of cancer therapies and quality of life issues in the 1980s. He has positions in organizations including the Stem Cell Network, Project Open Source, Canadian Breast Cancer Foundation, and others. Among them, Till is:

- University Professor Emeritus at the University of Toronto
- Editorial member of the open access journal Journal of Medical Internet Research
- Founding board member of the Canadian Stem Cell Foundation

McCulloch's later research had an emphasis on cellular and molecular mechanisms affecting the growth of malignant blast stem cells from the blood of patients with acute myeloblastic leukemia. McCulloch died on January 20, 2011, shortly before the 50th anniversary of the publication of the 1961 paper in Radiation Research.

== Recognition ==
Together, James Till and Ernest McCulloch were:

- Awarded the Gairdner Award in 1969
- Recognized with the Albert Lasker Award for Basic Medical Research in 2005
- Inducted into the Canadian Medical Hall of Fame in 2004

Their scientific work has also earned them individual awards including:

- James Till

- 1993, awarded Robert L. Noble Prize by the Canadian Cancer Society
- 1994, made an Officer of the Order of Canada
- 2000, made a Fellow of the Royal Society of London
- 2004, inducted into the Canadian Medical Hall of Fame
- 2005, awarded the Albert Lasker Award for Basic Medical Research along with Ernest McCulloch
- 2006, made a member of the Order of Ontario

- Ernest McCulloch

- 1974, made a Fellow of the Royal Society of Canada
- 1988, made an Officer of the Order of Canada
- 1999, made a Fellow of the Royal Society of London
- 2004, inducted into the Canadian Medical Hall of Fame
- 2005, awarded the Albert Lasker Award for Basic Medical Research along with Jim Till
- 2006, made a member of Order of Ontario
