= Allen C. Eaves =

Canadian scientist

Allen Charles Edward Eaves OC OBC (born 1941) is the co-founding Director of the Terry Fox Laboratory for Hematology/Oncology Research, which over a 25-year period (1981–2006) he grew into an internationally recognized centre for the study of leukemia and stem cell research. His own research on chronic myelogenous leukemia (CML) has led the way to a new understanding of the disease. As Head of Hematology at the British Columbia Cancer Agency and the University of British Columbia for 18 years (1985–2003) he engineered the building of one of the first and largest bone marrow transplant programs in Canada. In recognition of his research accomplishments and leadership in moving basic science discoveries in stem cell biology into the clinic, he was elected President of the International Society of Cellular Therapy (1995–1997), Treasurer of the Foundation for the Accreditation of Cellular Therapy (1995–2002) and President of the American Society of Blood and Marrow Transplantation (1999–2000). In 2003 he was awarded the prestigious R. M. Taylor Medal by the Canadian Cancer Society and the National Cancer Institute of Canada.

In 2006 Eaves retired as required by provincial law at that time, becoming professor emeritus of Hematology and spending more time on several companies he founded to further the fields of cellular therapy and regenerative medicine - STEMCELL Technologies, STEMSOFT Software Inc. and Malachite Management Inc. These companies continue to grow under his leadership and as of 2023, STEMCELL has over 2,300 full-time employees making it Canada's largest biotechnology company. Under Eaves' leadership, STEMCELL has received multiple Best Managed Company Award from Deloitte.

In 2016, Eaves was awarded the Order of British Columbia as well as named Ernst and Young's Entrepreneur Of The Year™ Pacific. In December 2022, he was appointed an Officer of the Order of Canada.

== Education ==
Eaves is the son of Charles Eaves, a Canadian horticultural scientist who extended the storage of apples by controlling levels of oxygen and carbon dioxide, and Margot Vernon Smith, granddaughter of T. T. Vernon Smith, a civil engineer who managed the building of the Windsor and Annapolis Railway. Allen Eaves was born in Ottawa, Ontario, but moved at an early age to Nova Scotia. Interested in science, he attended Acadia University and graduated with a BSc in Biology and Mathematics in 1962. He then went to Dalhousie University, completing his MSc in cell physiology under Dr. Gordon Kaplan on A Radiological Investigation of Two Cellular Enzyme Systems of Yeast (1964). The untimely cancer death of a family friend led him to switch to medicine, completing his MD and internship in 1969. During his medical training he was greatly influenced by Dr. Ross Langley, a research-oriented hematologist who suggested that Eaves do a PhD at the Princess Margaret Hospital in Toronto where Dr. Robert Bruce was collaborating with Drs. James Till and Ernest McCulloch (Lasker Award) on how different types of cancer chemotherapeutic agents killed tumour stem cells while sparing normal stem cells.

Working under the supervision of Bruce (AACR Award), and in association with Till and McCulloch and a vibrant group of graduate students and post-doctoral fellows, Eaves completed his PhD in Medical Biophysics at the University of Toronto with a thesis entitled Studies on the Control of Murine Bone Marrow Function (1974). Eaves then decided to complete his clinical specialist training in Internal Medicine and Medical Oncology in Canada so that he could be licensed to work in Canada and have access to human material for studying leukemia directly in humans, rather than in mice. He received this further clinical training in Toronto and Vancouver, becoming a Fellow of the Royal College of Physicians and Surgeons of Canada in 1979 and a Fellow of the American College of Physicians (FACP) in 1980. He then joined the staff of the BC Cancer Agency, the Vancouver General Hospital and the University of British Columbia in 1979 as an assistant professor, becoming associate professor in 1984, professor in 1989 and professor emeritus of Hematology in 2006.

== Career ==
In 1981, as one of the first Scholars of the BC Health Care Research Foundation, Eaves founded the Terry Fox Laboratory. As Director of the TFL over the next 25 years, he built the TFL into an internationally recognized research group with a staff of over 150 including 13 senior scientists, 35 graduate students and 40 post doctoral fellows (www.bccrc.ca/tfl). The TFL is a leader in understanding the regulation of hematopoietic (blood-forming) stem cell growth and differentiation. The TFL played a leadership role in obtaining the CFI grant that initiated funding for the new $100 million, 15 storey, BC Cancer Research Centre (opened on March 1, 2005), where the TFL occupies the top several floors. Eaves' personal research has focused on leukemia where he pioneered "culture purging" as a novel approach to doing autologous bone marrow transplantation for chronic myelogenous leukemia. He has over 200 papers in leading peer-review scientific journals. In 2003 he was awarded the prestigious R. M. Taylor Medal by the Canadian Cancer Society and the National Cancer Institute of Canada.

In 1985, Eaves became Head of Hematology at UBC, the VGH and the BCCA where for the next 18 years he focused on building the world class Leukemia/Bone Marrow Transplant (BMT) Program of British Columbia. This was one of the first BMT programs in Canada and by the early 1990s over 1500 patients had been transplanted of which 300 were from other provinces (generating revenue for BC of over $30 million). The program also trained a significant number of BMT specialists, many of whom have played a role in starting BMT programs elsewhere in Canada and abroad. In recognition of his interests in BMT he was elected President of the International Society of Cell Therapy (1995–97), President of the American Society of Blood and Marrow Transplantation (1999–00) and Treasurer of the Foundation for the Accreditation of Cellular Therapy (FACT) (1995–2002). He has also been a member of Health Canada's Expert Working Group on the Safety of Organs and Tissues for Transplantation, and the Canadian Standards Association's Task Force to develop standards and an accreditation process for cellular therapies and transplantation in Canada (1998–2006).

In the 1980s, to raise money to support running the Terry Fox Laboratory, Eaves sold urinary erythropoietin and tissue culture reagents to research colleagues around the world. By the early 1990s it became necessary to make the tissue culture media in a clean room. However, the BC Cancer Foundation did not have the $1 million needed to build such a facility and encouraged Eaves to buy the business from them and raise the money himself, which he did by fully mortgaging his home and obtaining a loan from Western Economic Diversification. Starting with 8 employees in 1993, STEMCELL Technologies Inc has grown at approximately 20% per annum and in by the spring of 2018 had over 1,000 employees worldwide. STEMCELL is Canada's largest biotechnology company. It has more than 2000 products in its catalogue, the lead ones are all made in its manufacturing facility in Vancouver. STEMCELL remains profitable with 2015 sales of approximately $100 million. An internationally competitive and export-orientated company, 95% of its customers are outside of Canada. In addition to its Vancouver facilities, STEMCELL has distribution and sales offices in the US, Europe, Australia and Singapore plus distributors in all other major countries. A spin-off company, STEMSOFT Software Inc, makes software for managing data in BMT centres, cord blood banks, cellular therapy companies and tumour/tissue repositories. A second spin-off, Malachite Management Inc, provides society and meeting management for such organizations as the Canadian Blood and Marrow Transplant Group, the International Society for Cell Therapy, the American Society for Apheresis and the Canadian Association of Oncology Nurses. In 2018 the STEMCELL Group had over 1,000 employees located in four facilities across the Lower Mainland. STEMCELL Technologies Inc supports Canada's Networks of Centres of Excellence (NCE) Program, including: the Stem Cell Network where STEMCELL Technologies Inc is the major corporate supporter and Eaves is a member of the Board, and the Mathematics of Information Technology and Complex Systems, Mitacs Inc. where Eaves previously served as chairman of the board of directors.

== Honours and awards ==
- BC Export Awards, Leadership category, 2016
- Ernst and Young, Entrepreneur Of The Year™ Pacific, 2016
- Order of Canada, Officer, 2022

== Select published papers ==
- Coulombel, Laure; Kalousek, Dagmar K.; Eaves, Connie J.; Gupta, Chander M.; Eaves, Allen C. (1983-06-23). "Long-Term Marrow Culture Reveals Chromosomally Normal Hematopoietic Progenitor Cells in Patients with Philadelphia Chromosome-Positive Chronic Myelogenous Leukemia". New England Journal of Medicine. 308 (25): 1493–1498. doi:10.1056/NEJM198306233082502. ISSN 0028-4793. PMID 6574315.
- Eaves, A C; Cashman, J D; Gaboury, L A; Kalousek, D K; Eaves, C J (July 1986). "Unregulated proliferation of primitive chronic myeloid leukemia progenitors in the presence of normal marrow adherent cells". Proceedings of the National Academy of Sciences. 83 (14): 5306–5310. Bibcode:1986PNAS...83.5306E. doi:10.1073/pnas.83.14.5306. ISSN 0027-8424. PMC 304373. PMID 3460093.
- Barnett, MJ; Eaves, CJ; Phillips, GL; Kalousek, DK; Klingemann, HG; Lansdorp, PM; Reece, DE; Shepherd, JD; Shaw, GJ; Eaves, AC (1989). "Successful autografting in chronic myeloid leukaemia after maintenance of marrow in culture". Bone Marrow Transplant. 4 (4): 345–51. PMID 2775921.
- Eaves, CJ; Eaves, AC (1978). "Erythropoietin (Ep) dose-response curves for three classes of erythroid progenitors in normal human marrow and in patients with polycythemia vera". Blood. 52 (6): 1196–210. doi:10.1182/blood.V52.6.1196.1196. PMID 719172.
- Cashman, JD; et al. (1988). "Unregulated proliferation of primitive neoplastic progenitor cells in long-term polycythemia vera marrow cultures". J Clin Invest. 81 (1): 87–91. doi:10.1172/JCI113315. PMC 442477. PMID 3335645.
- Hogge, DE; Coulombel, L; Kalousek, DK; Eaves, CJ; Eaves, AC (1987). "Nonclonal hemopoietic progenitors in a G6PD heterozygote with chronic myelogenous leukemia revealed after long-term marrow culture". Am J Hematol. 24 (4): 389–394. doi:10.1002/ajh.2830240408. PMID 3471084.
- Hogge, DE; Shannon, KM; Kalousek, DK; Schonberg, S; Schaffner, V; Zoger, S; Eaves, CJ; Eaves, AC (1987). "Juvenile monosomy 7 syndrome: Evidence that the disease originates in a pluripotent hemopoietic stem cell". Leuk Res. 11 (8): 705–709. doi:10.1016/0145-2126(87)90006-3. PMID 3626612.
- Turhan, AG; Humphries, RK; Cashman, JD; Cuthbert, DA; Eaves, CJ; Eaves, AC (1988). "Transient suppression of clonal hemopoiesis associated with pregnancy in a patient with a myeloproliferative disorder". J Clin Invest. 81 (6): 1999–2003. doi:10.1172/JCI113549. PMC 442654. PMID 2898487.
- Barnett, MJ; Eaves, CJ; Phillips, GL; Kalousek, DK; Klingemann, H-G; Lansdorp, PM; Reece, DE; Shepherd, JD; Shaw, GJ; Eaves, AC (1989). "Successful autografting in chronic myeloid leukaemia after maintenance of marrow in culture". Bone Marrow Transplant. 4 (4): 345–351. PMID 2775921.
- Szilvassy, SJ; Fraser, CC; Eaves, CJ; Lansdorp, PM; Eaves, AC; Humphries, RK (1989). "Retrovirus-mediated gene transfer to purified hemopoietic stem cells with long-term lympho-myelopoietic repopulating ability". Proc Natl Acad Sci USA. 86 (22): 8798–8802. Bibcode:1989PNAS...86.8798S. doi:10.1073/pnas.86.22.8798. PMC 298377. PMID 2573066.
- Turhan, AG; Humphries, RK; Phillips, GL; Eaves, AC; Eaves, CJ (1989). "Clonal hematopoiesis demonstrated by X-linked DNA polymorphisms after allogeneic bone marrow transplantation". N Engl J Med. 320 (25): 1655–1661. doi:10.1056/NEJM198906223202504. PMID 2566916.
- Sutherland, HJ; Lansdorp, PM; Henkelman, DH; Eaves, AC; Eaves, CJ (1990). "Functional characterization of individual human hematopoietic stem cells cultured at limiting dilution on supportive marrow stromal layers". Proc Natl Acad Sci USA. 87 (9): 3584–3588. Bibcode:1990PNAS...87.3584S. doi:10.1073/pnas.87.9.3584. PMC 53946. PMID 2333304.
- Szilvassy, SJ; Humphries, RK; Lansdorp, PM; Eaves, AC; Eaves, CJ (1990). "Quantitative assay for totipotent reconstituting hematopoietic stem cells by a competitive repopulation strategy". Proc Natl Acad Sci USA. 87 (22): 8736–8740. Bibcode:1990PNAS...87.8736S. doi:10.1073/pnas.87.22.8736. PMC 55034. PMID 2247442.
- Turhan, AG; Humphries, RK; Eaves, CJ; Barnett, MJ; Phillips, GL; Kalousek, DK; Klingemann, H-G; Lansdorp, PM; Reece, DE; Shepherd, JD; Eaves, AC (1990). "Detection of breakpoint cluster region-negative and nonclonal hematopoiesis in vitro and in vivo after transplantation of cells selected in cultures of chronic myeloid leukemia marrow". Blood. 76 (11): 2404–2410. doi:10.1182/blood.V76.11.2404.2404. PMID 2175222.
- Udomsakdi, C; Eaves, CJ; Swolin, B; Reid, DS; Barnett, MJ; Eaves, AC (1992). "Rapid decline of chronic myeloid leukemic cells in long-term culture due to a defect at the leukemic stem cell level". Proc Natl Acad Sci USA. 89 (13): 6192–6196. Bibcode:1992PNAS...89.6192U. doi:10.1073/pnas.89.13.6192. PMC 402148. PMID 1631107.
- Eaves, CJ; Cashman, JD; Wolpe, SD; Eaves, AC (1993). "Unresponsiveness of primitive chronic myeloid leukemia cells to macrophage inflammatory protein 1a, an inhibitor of primitive normal hematopoietic cells". Proc Natl Acad Sci USA. 90 (24): 12015–12019. doi:10.1073/pnas.90.24.12015. PMC 48116. PMID 8265663.
- Petzer, AL; Eaves, CJ; Lansdorp, PM; Ponchio, L; Barnett, MJ; Eaves, AC (1996). "Characterization of primitive subpopulations of normal and leukemic cells present in the blood of patients with newly diagnosed as well as established chronic myeloid leukemia". Blood. 88 (6): 2162–2171. doi:10.1182/blood.V88.6.2162.bloodjournal8862162. PMID 8822936.
- Cashman JD, Eaves CJ, Sarris AH & Eaves AC. MCP-1, not MIP-1a is the endogenous chemokine that cooperates with TGF-b to inhibit the cycling of primitive normal but not leukemic (CML) progenitors in long-term human marrow cultures Blood 1998; 92: 2338–2344
- Jiang, X; Lopez, A; Holyoake, T; Eaves, A; Eaves, C (1999). "Autocrine production and action of IL-3 and granulocyte colony-stimulating factor in chronic myeloid leukemia". Proc Natl Acad Sci USA. 96 (22): 12804–12809. Bibcode:1999PNAS...9612804J. doi:10.1073/pnas.96.22.12804. PMC 23105. PMID 10536003.
- Jiang X, Fujisaki T, Nicolini F, Berger M, Holyoake T, Eisterer W, Eaves C & Eaves A. Autonomous multi-lineage differentiation in vitro of primitive CD34+ cells from patients with chronic myeloid leukemia Leukemia 2000; 14: 1112–1121
- Holyoake, TL; Jiang, X; Jorgensen, HG; Graham, S; Alcorn, MJ; Laird, C; Eaves, AC; Eaves, CJ (2001). "Primitive quiescent leukemic cells from patients with chronic myeloid leukemia spontaneously initiate factor-independent growth in vitro in association with up-regulation of expression of interleukin-3". Blood. 97 (3): 720–728. doi:10.1182/blood.V97.3.720. PMID 11157490.
- Cashman, J; Dykstra, B; Clark-Lewis, I; Eaves, A; Eaves, C (2002). "Changes in the proliferative activity of human hematopoietic stem cells in NOD/SCID mice and enhancement of their transplantability after in vivo treatment with cell cycle inhibitors". J Exp Med. 196 (9): 1141–1149. doi:10.1084/jem.20010916. PMC 2194104. PMID 12417625.
- Jiang, X; Zhao, Y; Chan, WY; Vercauteren, S; Pang, E; Kennedy, S; Nicolini, F; Eaves, A; Eaves, C (2004). "Deregulated expression in Ph+ human leukemias of AHI-1, a gene activated by insertional mutagenesis in mouse models of leukemia". Blood. 103 (10): 3897–3904. doi:10.1182/blood-2003-11-4026. PMID 14751929.

== See also ==
- James Till
- Ernest McCulloch
- Connie Eaves
- Stem Cells
- Hematopoiesis
- Hematopoietic stem cells
- Cellular therapy
- Bone marrow transplantation
- Chronic myelogenous leukemia
- Polycythemia vera
- BC Cancer Research Centre
- BC Cancer Agency
- STEMCELL Technologies
