= Canadian Stem Cell Foundation =

Canadian non-profit organization

- Abbreviation: CSCF
- Formation: 2008
- Type: NPO

The Canadian Stem Cell Foundation is an independent, non-profit organization established in 2008 and situated in Ottawa, Ontario. Stem Cell science is a Canadian innovation through the discovery of stem cells by Drs. James Till and Ernest McCulloch. It is globally known as the leading organization for stem cell research and support in the study of treatments and cures for diseases such as cancer, diabetes, blindness and stroke.

== The Canadian Stem Cell Strategy ==
Their first strategy was created in 2013 to determine the concerns and actions required to develop an innovation that can advance stem cell research and clinics. The Canadian Stem Cell Foundation's goals are to invest a strategy for new treatments, sustainable healthcare, therapies and beneficial products. Their goals are beyond their capacity, such as "using cells to treat respiratory heart diseases, restore lost vision, create a source of insulin-producing cells to treat diabetes, repair damaged spinal cords, reverse the effect of MS, Crohn's disease and other autoimmune disorders, reduce the ravages of Parkinson's disease and reverse tumour formation in the brain, breast and other solid tissues." Their other goals are to bring together scientists, institutions, health charities, industry partners, regulators, funders and philanthropists in a universal vision in the developments of stem cell science research and have public and private sectors support in the funding for stem cell research in the long-term.

There are many organizations involved such as the Stem Cell Network, Health Charities Coalition of Canada, Ontario Stem Cell Initiative, Centre for Commercialization of Regenerative Medicine, Ontario Bioscience Innovation Organization, and Cell CAN Regenerative Medicine and Cell Therapy Network.

To follow updates regarding "The Canadian Stem Cell Strategy," visit the site: http://www.stemcellfoundation.ca/en/blog/categories/listings/strategy-updates

== The Stem Cell Charter ==
The Stem Cell Charter is an appeal launched in September, regarding the support for stem cell research. It is an interactive document that seeks concern for humanity with reference to stem cell science. It was created and written by, Bartha Maria Knoppers of McGill University, with a team of stem cell scientists, patients, ethicists and laypeople. This document is accessible to many individuals around the world, it is not a document for scientists, government officials or physicians, but for all. The charter includes five principles such as, "responsible science, protection of citizens, intellectual freedom, transparency and integrity." The document's goal is to bring people together with the belief that stem cell science has the potential to conquer disease and advance medicine. Moreover, many significant scientists have endorsed the Charter, including Mick Bhatia, Tim Caulfield, John Dick, Connie Eaves, Norman Iscove, Gordon Keller, Derek van der Kooy, Freda Miller, Andras Nagy, Janer Rossant, Michael Rudnicki, Guy Sauvageau, Jim Till and Sam Weiss.

Over 3000 individuals have signed the charter, any individual can sign the charter by visiting the link: http://www.stemcellfoundation.ca/en/act/charter?view=default
