= John Edgar Dick =

Canadian cancer researcher (born 1954)

John Dick FRS FRSC
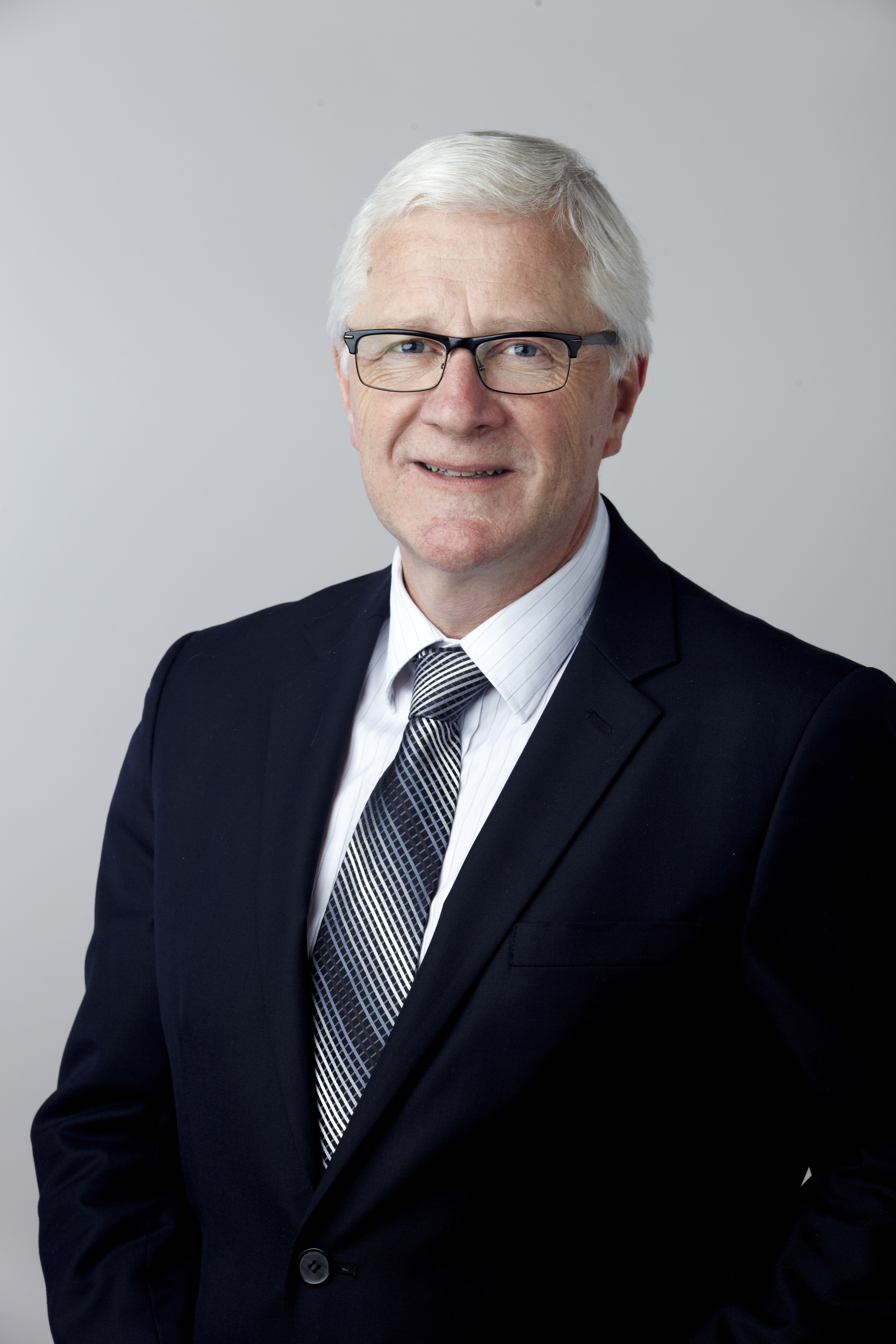
- John Dick at the Royal Society admissions day in London in 2014
- Born: John Edgar Dick; 1954 (age 71–72)
- Education: University of Manitoba (PhD)
- Awards: Robert L. Noble Prize (2000)
- Scientific career
- Fields: Cancer stem cells; Leukemia; Xenotransplantation
- Workplaces: University of Toronto; Princess Margaret Cancer Centre; University Health Network
- Thesis: [ProQuest 303339990 Studies on Ribonucleotide Reductase from Normal Senescing Human Diploid Fibroblasts] (1984)
- Website: jdstemcellresearch.ca

John Edgar Dick FRS FRSC (born 1954) is Canada Research Chair in Stem Cell Biology, Senior Scientist at the Princess Margaret Cancer Centre, University Health Network and Professor in the Department of Molecular Genetics at the University of Toronto in Canada. Dick is credited with first identifying cancer stem cells in certain types of human leukemia. His revolutionary findings highlighted the importance of understanding that not all cancer cells are the same and thus spawned a new direction in cancer research. Dick is also known for his demonstration of a blood stem cell's ability to replenish the blood system of a mouse, his development of a technique to enable an immune-deficient mouse to carry and produce human blood, and his creation of the world's first mouse with human leukemia.

== Early life and education ==
Dick was raised on a farm in southern Manitoba. His early education was gained in a one-room schoolhouse. Later he moved to Winnipeg to study to become an X-ray technician. There he noticed one of his roommates was attending university and studying biology. Dick realized he was more interested in biology and decided to switch pursuits.

Dick started off at the University of Manitoba specializing in microbiology and graduating with a Doctor of Philosophy degree in 1984.

== Career and research ==
In 1984, he moved to Toronto. In order to support his wife and two children, Dick worked part-time at an X-ray lab while he finished his post-doctorate work in Alan Bernstein’s lab. Bernstein, a noted cancer researcher whose Ph.D. advisor was James Till at the Ontario Cancer Institute, guided Dick to research cancers of the blood.

Over the next five years, Dick developed an in vivo repopulation assay using the NOD/SCID mouse. This technique of using an immune-deficient mouse to generate human hematopoietic cells won Dick international recognition.

In 1994, Nature published his paper which described how cancer stem cells grow slowly. Dick explained, "Most kinds of chemotherapy are designed to kill fast-growing cancer cells. This is why leukemia can come back after treatment. To get rid of the cancer, you have to find ways of eliminating the stem cells." Many researchers dismissed Dick's discovery as interesting, but something not likely to apply to solid tumours.

In 1997, Dick reported the detection of cancer stem cells at the root of three other forms of leukemia. This time he presented it as the "cancer stem-cell hypothesis". His model stated that there are different cancer cells and amongst them there is a pecking order in which the abnormal stem cell, is both the key to forming and feeding a cancer. Therefore, without an abnormal stem cell, cancers will not grow. This time his report was considered a breakthrough.

Dick has transformed the study of human hematopoiesis and leukemogenesis, with his development of methodologies for transplanting human bone marrow into immune-deficient mice, with resultant multilineage repopulation of murine bone marrow and other hematopoietic tissues. Using this approach, he has identified long-term repopulating human hematopoietic stem cells and generated mouse models of leukaemia. His studies showing that a specific subset of leukemic cells are actually capable of recapitulating tumour growth are recognised as the foundation for all current work on the cancer stem cell model and its application to cancer therapy.

As of 2006, Dick is a Senior Scientist in the Division of Cellular & Molecular Biology of the Toronto General Research Institute, and founding member of Canada's Stem Cell Network.

=== Awards and honours ===
Dick's awards and honours include:

- 1997: awarded the Michael Smith Prize by the Canadian Institutes for Health Research
- 2000: awarded the Robert L. Noble Prize for Excellence in Cancer Research by the National Cancer Institute of Canada
- 2002: awarded the Herman Boerhaave Medal by the Leiden University, Netherlands
- 2004: elected a Fellow of the Royal Society of Canada (FRSC)
- 2005: awarded the William Dameshek Prize by the American Society of Hematology
- 2007: awarded a Premier's Summit Award in Medical Research, Province of Ontario
- 2014: elected a Fellow of the Royal Society (FRS)
- 2017: awarded Keio Medical Science Prize for his work on cancer stem cells
- 2020: Pezcoller Foundation-AACR International Award for Extraordinary Achievement in Cancer Research
