= Dick Hill (scientist) =

Richard "Dick" P. Hill is a scientist. His work in Applied Molecular Oncology has led to advanced cancer treatments.

He was born in Belfast, Northern Ireland and gained a B.A in Physics from St John's College, Oxford in 1964 and a Ph.D from London University in 1967. He carried out research at the Ontario Cancer Institute from 1967 to 1971, the Institute of Cancer Research, London from 1971 to 1973 and from 1973 at the Ontario Cancer Institute.

In 2015, Hill was a professor at the Ontario Cancer Institute and a Senior Scientist at the Princess Margaret Cancer Centre within the University Health Network, which is affiliated with the University of Toronto Faculty of Medicine.

== Honours ==
- 2007, awarded the Robert L. Noble Prize for Excellence in Cancer Research by the Canadian Cancer Society
