= Anne Croy =

Canadian reproductive immunology professor (born 1946)

Anne Croy FRSC
- Born: Barbara Anne McLeish; 1946 (age 79–80); London, Ontario, Canada
- Education: DVM, 1969, University of Guelph; PhD., 1974, University of Toronto
- Spouse: Carl Croy (d. 2017)
- Children: 2
- Scientific career
- Fields: Biomedical and Molecular Sciences, Reproduction
- Institutions: University of Guelph; Queen's University
- Thesis: Studies on the immune responses of athymic mice (1974)
- Doctoral advisors: Ernest McCulloch; David Osoba

Barbara Anne Croy FCAHS FRSC (née McLeish) is a Canadian reproductive immunologist and professor emerita in Biomedical and Molecular Sciences at Queen's University. From 2004 until 2016, Croy was a Canada Research Chair in Reproduction, Development and Sexual Function. In 2017, she was elected a Fellow of the Royal Society of Canada. Her research focus is on mice pregnancy and natural killer cells.

== Early life and career ==
Croy was born to parents Laura Agnes and Ed McLeish as Barbara Anne McLeish. Barbara Anne McLeish was born in 1946 in London, Ontario.

After finding success in science during high school, Croy decided to pursue a career as a veterinarian. She attended the University of Guelph to partake in their veterinary courses. Croy was one of three women in her graduating class.

After receiving her DVM from the University of Guelph in 1969, Croy went immediately to work under the directions of Ernest McCulloch and David Osoba at the University of Toronto where she was awarded a PhD in 1974. She went on to become the first nonmedical doctor to earn her PhD at the University of Toronto's Institute of Medical Sciences. After graduating with her PhD, Croy and her husband operated their own veterinary practice in St. Catharines, Ontario from 1975 to 1997.

From 1985 to 2004, Croy worked in Guelph's Ontario Veterinary College (OVC). She worked as an associate professor in Biomedical Sciences and was granted tenure by the university in 1988. While at Guelph, she mentored 35 students working on research projects in the Biomedical Sciences to achieve their undergraduate honors degree. After earning a placement at Princess Margaret Hospital, Croy became the first woman in their department of biomedical sciences to earn a PhD. Her work at the hospital focused on the immune system of mice. Due to her research in biomedical reproduction, Croy became a permanent study section member of the National Institutes of Health.

In 1993, she was awarded the Smith Kline Beecham Annual Health Trust Award for Research Excellence. The following year, she began teaching a graduate course on fetal health at OVC. In 1995, Croy accepted a research lab position at Brock University studying functional immune cells in mouse uterus while continuing her graduate studies at the university. She later accepted a position at the University of Guelph teaching the anatomy of cows and horses. She collaborated with Betty-Anne McBey to examine the purpose of natural killer cells in the uterus of pregnant women through mice experiments. In 1999, while working at the university, Croy was awarded the J.C.B. Grant Senior Scientist Award from the Canadian Association for Anatomy, Neurobiology and Cell Biology.

In the early 2000s, Croy began working as an adjunct professor at Roswell Park Comprehensive Cancer Center in Buffalo, New York after receiving funding for her research with natural killer cells. On January 24, 2002, Croy was awarded the Award of Merit from the Ontario Veterinary Medical Association.

Croy left the University of Guelph in 2004 after being named a Canada Research Chair in Reproduction, Development and Sexual Function at Queen's University.

== Later career ==
In 2005, Croy published "A Review of Trafficking and Activation of Uterine Natural Killer Cells." The following year, she was awarded the American Journal of Reproductive Immunology award by the American Society for Reproductive Immunology. She was also the 2007 recipient of the Munsgaard Blackwell award for outstanding publication in the field of reproduction immunology from the American Society for Reproductive Immunology.

In 2010, Croy renewed her position as Canada Research Chair and received $1.4 million over seven years to fund her study on early pregnancy, the regulation of gestational blood pressure, and post-partum immune memory effects. The following year, she collaborated with Aureo Yamada and International Trade Canada to create a federally-funded student exchange program centered around maternal health knowledge. In 2012, she was named a Fellow of the Canadian Academy of Health Sciences due to her research on maternal and infant health during pregnancy. She subsequently published "The Guide to Investigation of Mouse Pregnancy" in 2014 and received funding to research reproductive health and apply policy suggestions.

In 2015, she earned Queen University's Prizes for Excellence in Research but rescinded her position as Canada Research Chair in 2016. The next year, Croy was elected a Fellow of the Royal Society of Canada for her work with uterine NK cells during pregnancy.

== Personal life ==
Croy met her husband Carl Croy while studying veterinary medicine at the University of Guelph. Before his death in 2017, they had two children together.

== Selected publications ==
The following is a list of publications:

- Immunoglobulin and T cell receptor gene rearrangement analysis of animal diseases involving the immune system: final report (1990)
- Uterine natural killer cells: 5 tables (1997)
- Placenta: platform for life (2008)
- Guide to investigation of mouse pregnancy (2017)
