= James Woodgett =

British-born Researcher

James (Jim) Woodgett
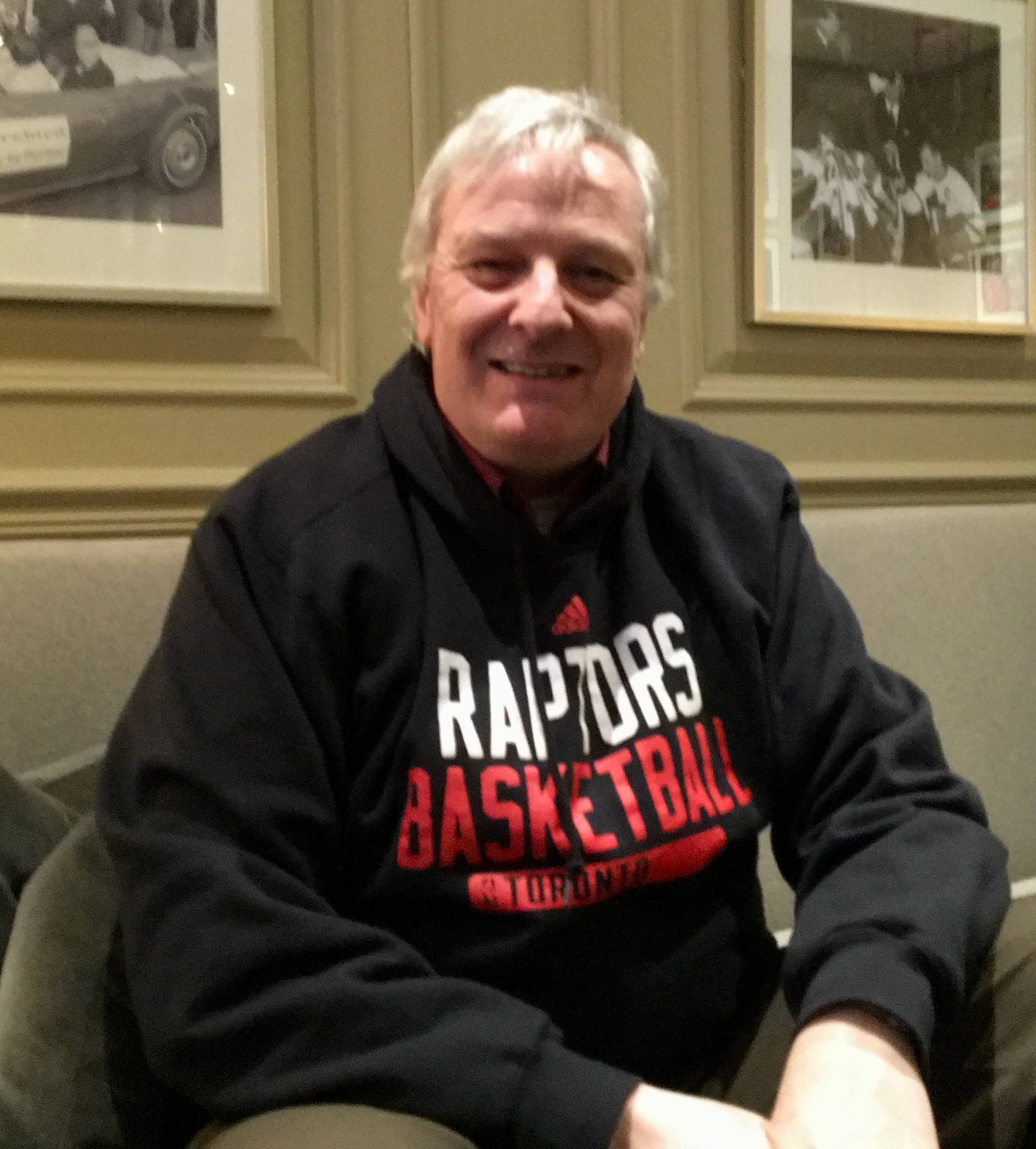
- Born: 9 February 1960 (age 66); Leicestershire, England
- Occupations: Research Institute Director (2005-21) and Principal Investigator
- Known for: co-discoveries of the molecules PKB/Akt and SAPK/JNKs, and the functions of the GSK-3 genes.
- Spouse: Caroline
- Awards: Fellow of the Royal Society of Canada

Academic background
- Education: BSc University of York, PhD University of Dundee
- Doctoral advisor: Sir Philip Cohen
- Other advisors: Tony Hunter, Salk Institute
- Influences: Louis Siminovitch

Academic work
- Discipline: Molecular Biology
- Sub-discipline: Molecular Biology
- Institutions: Lunenfeld-Tanenbaum Research Institute, Mount Sinai Hospital, Toronto
- Notable ideas: Characterization of the biological role of protein kinases including GSK-3, protein kinase B/Akt and stress-activated protein kinases
- Website: https://www.lunenfeld.ca/

James (Jim) Woodgett is a British-born biologist and the Principal Investigator of an active research laboratory at the Lunenfeld-Tanenbaum Research Institute, Sinai Health System (formerly Mount Sinai Hospital), in Toronto, Ontario, Canada. He was the Koffler Director of Research at the Lunenfeld-Tanenbaum Research Institute from November 2005 to January 2021.

Woodgett's research spans the fields of Signal Transduction, Cancer Stem Cells, Diabetes, and Neurological Disorders. He is known for his co-discoveries of the molecules PKB/Akt and SAPK/JNKs, which have central roles in the evolution of cancer. Woodgett is also an authority on the functions of the GSK-3 genes, which play significant roles in insulin/diabetes and brain development/Alzheimer's disease, as well as bipolar disorder.

Woodgett is a long-time advocate for increasing public support for science and medical research. He is known for his science communication and public science outreach, as well as his support for Women in STEM and early career researchers.

Woodgett is frequently interviewed by journalists to provide commentary on questions of research relating to health matters, and also medical and science research funding and policy.

== Biography ==
Jim Woodgett was born in Leicestershire in the United Kingdom, He grew up in the village of Quorn. Encouraged by his mother, he entered the BBC's Inventor of the Year competition and won a runner-up prize.

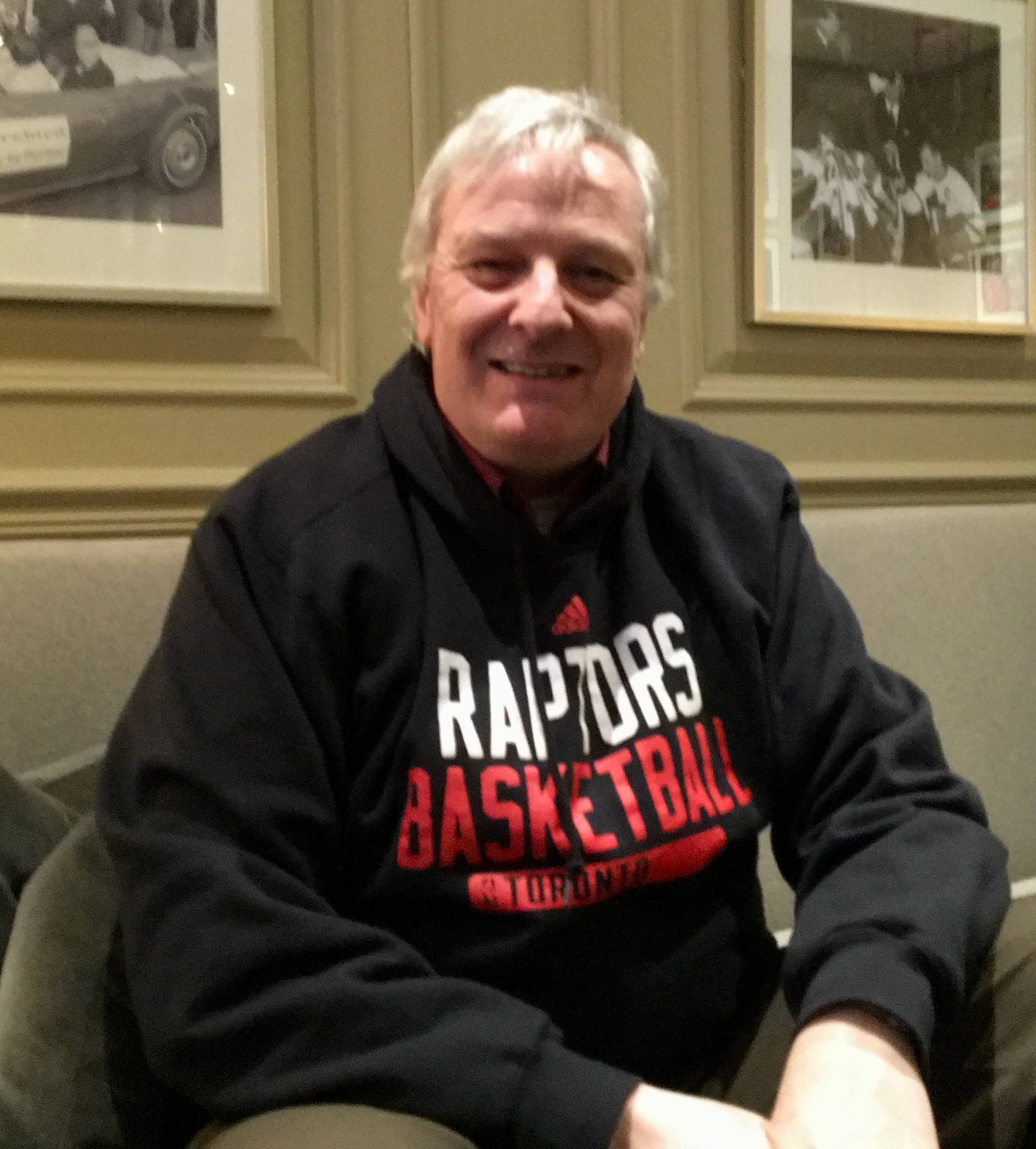
Jim Woodgett (at rest)

Woodgett studied biochemistry as an undergraduate at the University of York, before undertaking doctoral research at the University of Dundee, Scotland. He did post-doctoral research in Tony Hunter's group at the Salk Institute for Biological Studies in California. This was followed by five years (1987-1992) at the Ludwig Institute for Cancer Research in Middlesex, England, where he headed his own research laboratory.

In 1992, Woodgett and his family immigrated to Canada from the United Kingdom. He worked at the Ontario Cancer Institute, based at Princess Margaret Hospital. His fellow researchers at the time included Tak Mak and Josef Penninger. Woodgett went on to be appointed head of the division of experimental therapeutics, and director of the Microarray Centre at University Health Network.

In 2005, Woodgett became Director of the Lunenfeld-Tanenbaum Research Institute. He is also a professor of medical biophysics at the University of Toronto.

== Research ==
Jim Woodgett has (co-)authored over 300 peer-reviewed scientific research articles. In 2007, he was interviewed for the Question and Answer section of the journal Current Biology, about his research and thoughts on being a scientist.

== Scientific Community Service and Leadership ==
Woodgett is a Member of the Medical Advisory Board of the Gairdner Foundation.

When the CIHR proposed to change the way that it awarded research grants, including replacing the existing face-to-face peer reviews of grant applications with a virtual, anonymous review system, Woodgett wrote an open letter to Federal Health Minister Jane Philpott criticizing the changes. Within days more than 1,300 scientists and researchers had signed on to his letter. Woodgett subsequently met with Minister Philpott on July 13, 2016. While some plans were re-evaluated, Woodgett later told University Affairs magazine that with the next round of research applications looming, the CIHR grant system "is still a mess."

Together with Professor Imogen Coe, the founding Dean of Science at Ryerson University, Woodgett co-organized a one-day conference, held at the end of May 2017 in Toronto, at which researchers came together to discuss, and to support the findings of the Naylor Report: Investing in Canada's Future – Strengthening the Foundations of Canadian Research.

In June 2016, Dr. Kirsty Duncan, then Minister of Science in the Liberal government of Prime Minister Justin Trudeau, commissioned a nine-member advisory panel, chaired by former president of the University of Toronto, Dr. David Naylor, to consult with Canada's research community and to report on the state of basic science and scholarly inquiry in Canada.

== Honours and awards ==
2000 – Elected Fellow of the Royal Society of Canada in the field of Molecular Biology and Genetics

2018 – Awarded the Arthur Wynne Gold Medal by the Canadian Society for Molecular Biosciences

== Selected bibliography ==
1. John M Kyriakis, Papia Banerjee, Eleni Nikolakaki, Tianang Dai, Elizabeth A Rubie, Mir F Ahmad, Joseph Avruch, James R Woodgett (1994) The stress-activated protein kinase subfamily of c-Jun kinases. Nature 369 (6476): 156–160
2. Qi-Long Ying, Jason Wray, Jennifer Nichols, Laura Batlle-Morera, Bradley Doble, James Woodgett, Philip Cohen, Austin Smith (2008) The ground state of embryonic stem cell self-renewal. Nature 453 (7194): 519–523
