= Mark Henkelman =

Canadian medical biophysicist

- Education: Master of Science
- Alma mater: McMaster University
- Occupation: Medical biophysicist

R. Mark Henkelman was a Canadian biophysics researcher in the field of medical imaging, who was appointed as a Fellow of the Royal Society of Canada (2005) and the Order of Canada (2019) in recognition of his pioneering contributions to the field of magnetic resonance imaging. He died on June 28, 2024.

== Research career ==
Henkelman obtained a Master of Science degree in theoretical physics at McMaster University, followed by a PhD exploring the use of electron microscopy, under the supervision of Peter Ottensmeyer, at the University of Toronto.

The Ontario provincial government granted the Princess Margaret Hospital (now known as the Princess Margaret Cancer Centre) funding to purchase the first magnetic resonance imaging (MRI) scanner in Canada in 1982, making Henkelman one of the first to use and engage in MRI research in Canada, where he studied MRI image artifacts and developed image-guided surgery techniques, and used MRI in disease settings, such as cancer and neurosurgery. Henkelman then served as the vice-president of research at the Sunnybrook Health Science Centre before returning to the laboratory, and later in 2001, left to found a mouse imaging centre.

Henkelman was the director of the Toronto Centre for Phenogenomics' (TCP) Mouse Imaging Centre (MICe), where MICe uses digital imaging technologies to characterize mouse models of different human diseases. For example, Henkelman supervised then postdoctoral fellow, Jacob Ellegood (now a research associate at MICe), who partnered with Jason P. Lerch (an associate professor at the University of Toronto, and a MICe principal investigator), to scan mice with magnetic resonance imaging, specifically those with Autism Spectrum Disorder.

Henkelman was appointed a Canada Research Chair in Imaging Technologies in Human Diseases and Preclinical Model Cluster in 2008. He was a professor emeritus at the University of Toronto's Department of Medical Biophysics, and a senior scientist emeritus at The Hospital for Sick Children.

Henkelman's publications has been cited over 38,000 times, and has an h-index and i10-index of 98 and 327 respectively. He has received the Robert L. Noble Prize in 2008, the Izaak Walton Killam Memorial Prize in 2010, the Gold Medal of the International Society of Magnetic Resonance in Medicine in 1998, and was appointed a Fellow of the Royal Society of Canada in 2005, and an Officer of the Order of Canada in 2019.

== Selected bibliography ==
- Singh, Sheila K., Cynthia Hawkins, Ian D. Clarke, Jeremy A. Squire, Jane Bayani, Takuichiro Hide, R. Mark Henkelman, Michael D. Cusimano, and Peter B. Dirks. "Identification of human brain tumour initiating cells." Nature 432, no. 7015 (2004): 396.
- Stanisz, Greg J., Ewa E. Odrobina, Joseph Pun, Michael Escaravage, Simon J. Graham, Michael J. Bronskill, and R. Mark Henkelman. "T1, T2 relaxation and magnetization transfer in tissue at 3T." Magnetic Resonance in Medicine: An Official Journal of the International Society for Magnetic Resonance in Medicine 54, no. 3 (2005): 507-512.
- Henkelman, R. Mark. "Measurement of signal intensities in the presence of noise in MR images." Medical Physics 12, no. 2 (1985): 232-233.
- Henkelman, R. M., G. J. Stanisz, and S. J. Graham. "Magnetization transfer in MRI: a review." NMR in Biomedicine: An International Journal Devoted to the Development and Application of Magnetic Resonance In Vivo 14, no. 2 (2001): 57-64.
- Henkelman, R. Mark, Xuemei Huang, Qing‐San Xiang, G. J. Stanisz, Scott D. Swanson, and Michael J. Bronskill. "Quantitative interpretation of magnetization transfer." Magnetic resonance in medicine 29, no. 6 (1993): 759-766.

== See also ==
- List of companions of the Order of Canada
- Robert L. Noble Prize
- Izaak Walton Killam Memorial Prize
