= Collaboration for AIDS Vaccine Discovery =

International research network

The Collaboration for AIDS Vaccine Discovery (CAVD) is an international network of scientists, research organizations, and promoters of HIV vaccine research.

== Partners ==
The CAVD was founded in 2006 when the Bill & Melinda Gates Foundation donated $287 million USD to promote HIV vaccine research. The CAVD itself supports the Global HIV Vaccine Enterprise. The network comprises many individual institutions.
