= Nada Jabado =

Canadian physician and researcher

Nada Jabado OC FRSC
- Education: Université de Paris VI
- Awards: Rawls Prize; Wei Prize; Robert L. Noble Prize
- Scientific career
- Fields: Pediatrics
- Thesis: Signal négatif de l’activation lymphocytaire T par la molécule CD4 : Caractérisation des événements biochimiques et moléculaires
- Website: www.jabadolab.com

Nada Jabado OC FRSC is a Canadian professor of Pediatrics at McGill University, and a physician at the Montreal Children's Hospital. In 2024, she was named 2024 L’Oréal-UNESCO For Women in Science Laureate for North America.

== Education ==
After completing her paediatric residency at Paris University with a focus on hemato-oncology, Jabado went on to the Marie Curie Institute in Paris for her PhD in Immunology. She completed her post-doctoral fellowship in biochemistry at the McGill University.

She started her research programme on paediatric brain tumours in 2003 at the Research Institute of the McGill University Health Centre, where she started her work as an independent investigator.

== Awards and distinctions ==
She is a fellow of the Royal Society of Canada, the 2011 winner of the William E. Rawls Prize of the Canadian Cancer Society, and the 2020 winner of the Dr. Chew Wei Memorial Prize in Cancer Research of the University of British Columbia.

She was appointed to the Order of Canada in 2024, with the rank of Officer.

== Most cited papers ==
- Schwartzentruber J, Korshunov A, Liu XY, Jones DT, Pfaff E, Jacob K, Sturm D, Fontebasso AM, Quang DA, Tönjes M, Hovestadt V. ... N. Jabado Driver mutations in histone H3. 3 and chromatin remodelling genes in paediatric glioblastoma. Nature. 2012 Feb;482(7384):226-31. According to Google Scholar, it has been cited 1871 times.
- Sturm D, Witt H, Hovestadt V, Khuong-Quang DA, Jones DT, Konermann C, Pfaff E, Tönjes M, Sill M, Bender S, Kool M.... N. Jabado. Hotspot mutations in H3F3A and IDH1 define distinct epigenetic and biological subgroups of glioblastoma. Cancer cell. 2012 Oct 16;22(4):425-37. According to Google Scholar, this article has been cited 1400 times
- Jones DT, Jäger N, Kool M, Zichner T, Hutter B, Sultan M, Cho YJ, Pugh TJ, Hovestadt V, Stütz AM, Rausch T. .. N Jabado. Dissecting the genomic complexity underlying medulloblastoma. Nature. 2012 Aug;488(7409):100-5. According to Google Scholar, this article has been cited764 times

She has over 200 peer-reviewed publications to her credit in journals including Nature Genetics, Nature, Science and Cell.
