= Purton (disambiguation) =

Purton is a village in Wiltshire, England.

Purton may also refer to:

== Places ==
- Purton, Berkeley, a village near Berkeley in Gloucestershire, England on the east bank of the River Severn
- Purton, Lydney, a hamlet near Lydney in Gloucestershire, on the west bank of the Severn opposite Purton, Berkeley

== People ==
- Jared Purton (1976–2009), Australian immunologist working in the United States
- Louise Purton, Australian biologist
- Zac Purton (born 1983), Australian horse jockey

== See also ==
- Purton F.C.
- Purton railway station
- Pirton (disambiguation)
- Puriton, a village in Somerset, England
- Pyrton, a village in Oxfordshire, England
