= Carol Cass =

Canadian medical researcher (1942–2026)

Carol Cass FRSC FCAHS
- Born: October 18, 1942; Lexington, Kentucky, U.S.
- Died: August 11, 2026 (aged 83)
- Awards: Robert L. Noble Prize

Academic background
- Education: University of Oklahoma (BSc, MSc); University of California at Berkeley (PhD)

Academic work
- Discipline: Medicine
- Sub-discipline: Oncology

Carol Elizabeth Cass FRSC FCAHS (October 18, 1942 – August 11, 2026) was an American-born Canadian research scientist. From 2003 to 2010, Cass served as director of Alberta's Cross Cancer Institute. She was Canada Research Chair in oncology at the University of Alberta and was elected a fellow of the Royal Society of Canada and of the Canadian Academy of Health Sciences.

== Background ==
Cass was born in Lexington, Kentucky on October 18, 1942, to a physician father and homemaker mother. She earned her bachelor of science and master of science degrees at the University of Oklahoma and her PhD at the University of California at Berkeley.

In 1990, Cass was diagnosed with meningioma, a type of brain tumour. As a result, her eye had to be replaced with a prosthetic eye in February 2011.

Cass died on August 11, 2026, at the age of 83.

== Career ==
In 1970, Cass came to the University of Alberta with her husband, who was hired for a position in botany, and conducted her postdoctoral with Alan Paterson. From there, Cass became the only female professor in the university's Department of Biochemistry and the first female chair of the National Cancer Institute of Canada's (NCIC) Advisory Committee on Research. In 1996, Cass was appointed chair of the University of Alberta's Department of Oncology and associate director of research at the Cross Cancer Institute.

In 2000, Cass and Dr. Amira Klip shared the honour of the Canadian Society for Molecular Biosciences' Jeanne Manery Fisher Memorial Lecture Award. In 2002, Cass was elected a fellow of the Royal Society of Canada. A year later, Cass was also elected to serve as the director of the Cross Cancer Institute. While serving in these roles, Cass was selected to serve on the Ontario Ministry of Economic Development, Job Creation and Trade's Premier's Discovery Awards panel. She was also awarded the J. Gordon Kaplan Award for Excellence in Research in 2008.

In 2007, Cass was elected a fellow of the Canadian Academy of Health Sciences. In 2010, Cass left her position as director of the Cross Cancer Institute. In 2015, Cass was elected to sit on the LA Opera board.

== Research ==
Cass was recognized as an expert on nucleosides, a class of anti-cancer drugs. Her research has led to the more effective use of nucleoside drugs and the development of new treatments for patients with acute and chronic leukemias, lymphomas, and cancers of the lung, bladder, breast and pancreas. She determined that nucleoside-based drugs are able to cross cell membranes by binding to specialized transporter proteins. The drugs are able to enter and directly attack cancer cells during the binding process.

== Awards ==
- 2006, awarded the Robert L. Noble Prize by the National Cancer Institute of Canada for her contributions to cancer research.
- Fellow of the Royal Society of Canada and Canadian Academy of Health Sciences
- 2018, Alberta Medical Association Medal of Honour.
