= Rama Khokha =

Cancer scientist and researcher

- Education: University of Western Ontario
- Scientific career
- Thesis: Effects of d-norgestrel on lipid metabolism in the rat (1985)

Rama Khokha is a researcher and scientist in the field of medical biophysics and oncology. As of 2025, she serves as a senior scientist at the Princess Margaret Cancer Centre within the University Health Network and is a professor in the Department of Medical Biophysics, with a cross-appointment in the Department of Laboratory Medicine and Pathobiology at the University of Toronto.

== Early life and education ==
Khokha was born and raised in India. She received her M.Sc. from the University of Delhi, India and later received her Ph.D. in biochemistry in 1985 from the University of Western Ontario. Her postdoctoral work was done at the Cancer Research Labs in London, Ontario, until 1989. She received a Von Humboldt fellowship and spent two years at the European Molecular Biology Labs from 1990 to 1992. Khokha initiated her independent research program in 1990 at the London Regional Cancer Centre before joining the Ontario Cancer Institute at Princess Margaret Cancer Centre in 1996.

== Research ==
Khokha is known for her research on the understanding of cancers of the breast, liver, lung and bone, with a particular focus on understanding the molecular basis of breast cancer. She studies the tumor microenvironment and adult stem cell niches. She successfully mapped the biology of pancreatic cancer tumors and identifying three distinct tumor microenvironments. Her research uncovered insights into the role of progesterone in breast cancer stem cells and highlighted the importance of the TIMP gene family in regulating the tumor microenvironment. A research team led by Khokha found that aging can be prevented if the two factors that control tissue development are removed. When TIMP1 and TIMP3 were removed from mice, their breast tissue remained youthful.

== Selected publications ==
- Khokha, Rama; Waterhouse, Paul; Yagel, Simcha; Lala, Peeyush K.; Overall, Christopher M.; Norton, Gill; Denhardt, David T. (1989-02-17). "Antisense RNA-Induced Reduction in Murine TIMP Levels Confers Oncogenicity on Swiss 3T3 Cells". Science. 243 (4893): 947–950. doi:10.1126/science.2465572. ISSN 0036-8075.
- Joshi, Purna A.; Jackson, Hartland W.; Beristain, Alexander G.; Di Grappa, Marco A.; Mote, Patricia A.; Clarke, Christine L.; Stingl, John; Waterhouse, Paul D.; Khokha, Rama (2010). "Progesterone induces adult mammary stem cell expansion". Nature. 465 (7299): 803–807. doi:10.1038/nature09091. ISSN 0028-0836.
- Khokha, Rama; Murthy, Aditya; Weiss, Ashley (2013). "Metalloproteinases and their natural inhibitors in inflammation and immunity". Nature Reviews Immunology. 13 (9): 649–665. doi:10.1038/nri3499. ISSN 1474-1733.
- Jackson, Hartland W.; Defamie, Virginie; Waterhouse, Paul; Khokha, Rama (2017). "TIMPs: versatile extracellular regulators in cancer". Nature Reviews Cancer. 17 (1): 38–53. doi:10.1038/nrc.2016.115. ISSN 1474-175X.

== Honors and awards ==
In 2014, Khokha was co-recipient of the Robert L. Noble Prize awarded by the Canadian Cancer Society, recognizing her joint work with James Rutka in cancer research.
