= Purton (surname) =

Purton is a surname. Notable people with the surname include:

- Audrey Purton (1926–2016), British WRAC officer
- Jared Purton (1976–2009), Australian immunologist
- Louise Purton, Australian biologist
- Zac Purton (born 1983), Australian jockey
