= Thyroid Cancer Canada =

Cancer support organization in Canada

- Abbreviation: TCC
- Formation: 2000
- Type: NGO
- Legal status: charitable
- Location: Canada
- Website: www.thyroidcancercanada.org
- Formerly called: Canadian Thyroid Cancer Support Group

Thyroid Cancer Canada (TCC) is a volunteer organization dedicated to supporting patients with thyroid cancer. TCC was incorporated as a non-profit organization in 2002 and received charitable status in 2003. The organization was initially established under the name Canadian Thyroid Cancer Support Group (Thry'vors) Inc. and changed its name to Thyroid Cancer Canada/Cancer de la thyroide Canada in October 2009. As a charitable organization registered with the Canada Revenue Agency, TCC holds an annual general meeting (AGM) and elects a board of directors each year.

Thyroid Cancer Canada is operated entirely by volunteers. Moreover, it has no ongoing financial support from any institution or government program, nor does it receive core funding from any source.

== History ==
Thyroid Cancer Canada was started in 2000 after Canadian women from an online forum realized their common survivorship from thyroid cancer. These women had a few conversations off-line, and those who lived in the Toronto area met a few times over coffee. The first in-person meeting of these thyroid cancer survivors, some of whom became the founders of TCC, was held on May 7, 2000.

In the autumn of the year 2001, the TCC founders attended a meeting at a Toronto hospital with others working in the field of thyroid disease, including doctors, representatives from a thyroid foundation and reps from pharmaceutical companies. The main focus of the meeting was to look for ways to offer support to Canadian thyroid cancer patients. After this meeting, the TCC founders who attended decided to meet again and formalize their own group.

The first formal meeting of the TCC founders occurred in Kingston, Ontario, on January 19, 2002. Some items that were on the agenda for that first meeting have remained priorities. They looked at providing credible information to thyroid cancer patients in the form of printed material and a website. They also set out to offer support and information in various ways such as by telephone, email, online, and through hard copy publications. They discussed advocacy issues and the support of thyroid cancer research. Soon after the meeting the TCC founders started an Online Forum, which was modeled after the American one where they had first met.

They also decided on a name for their group. A friend of a group member suggested that they not refer to themselves as "survivors", since they were and still are thriving despite having cancer. They coined the spelling of "Thry'vors" as a combination of three words – thriving, thyroid and survivors. Although the organization has recently changed its name to Thyroid Cancer Canada, TCC will continue to refer to its members as Thry'vors.

== Mandate and goals ==
Thyroid Cancer Canada is working towards creating an environment in which people who are dealing with thyroid cancer, especially the newly diagnosed, are met with support and information. Thyroid Cancer Canada draws on the medical community to provide a consistent and high standard of support for all individuals dealing with the disease.

TCC's goals and objectives include facilitating communication among thyroid cancer patients, providing credible information about the disease, providing emotional support, and assisting thyroid cancer patients with voicing their needs to health care professionals and those who are responsible for healthcare policy.

TCC liaises with groups with similar or corresponding mandates.

TCC governs itself within the values and principles outlined in its By-Laws and Terms of Reference (available by request).

Thyroid Cancer Canada supports patients with free programs via:

- telephone
- email
- moderated online forum
- detailed website
- printed educational materials
- newsletter
- meetings, seminars and support assistance from an expert Medical Advisory Panel

== See also ==
- Canadian Cancer Society
- Thyroid cancer
- Cancer
- Healthcare in Canada
