= Alan Bernstein =

Canadian scientist (born 1947)

Alan Bernstein CC OOnt FRSC
- Born: June 25, 1947 (age 79)
- Education: University of Toronto (BSc, PhD)
- Known for: Health research Science policy Mentorship; Leadership
- Awards: FRSC (1991); The McLaughlin Medal, The Royal Society of Canada (1996); The Genetics Society of Canada Award of Excellence (1998); Officer, Order of Canada (2002); Gairdner Wightman Award 2008); Canadian Medical Hall of Fame (2015); Order of Ontario (2017); Companion, Order of Canada (2023)
- Scientific career
- Workplaces: University of Oxford; Canadian Institute for Advanced Research; Canadian Institutes of Health Research; Global HIV Vaccine Enterprise; Imperial Cancer Research Fund; Mount Sinai Hospital, Toronto; Ontario Cancer Institute
- Thesis: A Genetic Analysis of the TOL(A,B) Locus of Escherichia Coli K-12 (1972)
- Doctoral advisor: James Till

Alan Bernstein (born June 25, 1947) is a Canadian scientist who is Professor Emeritus at the University of Toronto and President Emeritus of the Canadian Institute for Advanced Research (CIFAR), where he served as president and CEO from 2012 to 2022. A Distinguished Fellow at the Munk School of Global Affairs and Public Policy, he is also a Fellow and Member of the Standing Committee for Science Planning at the International Science Council (2022-2025). Bernstein is recognized as a leader in health research, science policy, mentorship and organizational leadership.

== Education ==
Born in Toronto, Bernstein attended Oakwood Collegiate Institute, and then received his BSc and the James Loudon Gold Medal in Mathematics and Physics from the University of Toronto in 1968. He pursued biomedical research and obtained his Ph.D. at the University of Toronto in 1972 under the supervision of James Till with a thesis focusing on a genetic analysis of membrane mutants Escherichia coli.

== Career ==
Bernstein undertook postdoctoral research with G Steven Martin in London at the Imperial Cancer Research Fund, where he began working on retroviruses and their oncogenes.

Bernstein returned to Canada in 1974 to join the faculty of the Ontario Cancer Institute. In 1985, he joined the new Samuel Lunenfeld Research Institute at Mount Sinai Hospital as Head of the Division of Molecular and Developmental Biology, and then served as its director of research from 1994 to 2000.

In 2000, Bernstein became the inaugural president of the Canadian Institutes of Health Research (CIHR), where he oversaw the transformation of health research in Canada and championed women, early career scientists, and the importance of interdisciplinary team research.

In 2007, he became the first executive director of the Global HIV Vaccine Enterprise, an alliance of independent organizations around the world dedicated to accelerating the development of a preventive HIV vaccine. Bernstein oversaw the enterprise and led the development of the 2010 Scientific Strategic Plan for HIV vaccine development.

In 2012, Bernstein joined CIFAR as president and CEO. Under his presidency, the organization launched two Global Calls for Ideas and the CIFAR Azrieli Global Scholars program for early career investigators, as well as expanding the delivery of knowledge mobilization and public engagement activities, and moving in to offices in the MaRS Discovery District. During his leadership, the Government of Canada asked CIFAR to develop and lead the Pan-Canadian Artificial Intelligence Strategy. Upon his departure from CIFAR, a $1 million scholarship fund was created by donors in his name for select CIFAR Azrieli Global Scholars who become CIFAR Fellows.

In 2023, Bernstein was appointed Professor and Director of Global Health at the University of Oxford.

Bernstein is a member of many advisory and review boards including the Bill & Melinda Gates Foundation, the McGill University Health Centre and the Cumming School of Medicine, Calgary.

Bernstein is an advocate for interdisciplinary research, early-career investigators, and intellectual freedom. In his public remarks, he has emphasized the importance of early-career researchers and diversity in science.

== Research ==
Bernstein's research interests have centered on blood cell formation (hematopoiesis), cancer and embryonic development. He has authored more than 225 peer-reviewed scientific publications.

== Awards ==
- Fellow of the Royal Society of Canada, 1991
- Royal Society of Canada McLaughlin Medal, 1996
- Genetics Society of Canada Award of Excellence, 1998
- Australian Society of Medical Research Medal, 2001
- Officer of the Order of Canada, 2002.
- Queen Elizabeth II Golden Jubilee Medal, 2002
- Medaille du merite from the Institut de Recherche Clinique de Montréal, 2007
- Gairdner Wightman Award, 2008
- Queen Elizabeth II Diamond Jubilee Medal, 2012
- Henry G. Friesen International Prize in Health Research, 2017
- Order of Ontario, 2017
- Honoree at Public Policy Forum Testimonial Dinner and Awards, 2019

He is also the recipient of honorary degrees from Dalhousie University (2007), the University of British Columbia (2009), the University of Ottawa (2009), McGill University (2010), Queen's University (2013), the University of Sherbrooke (2014), the University of Toronto (2019), and Western University (2019).
