= Robert L. Noble Prize =

Canadian award for cancer research

The Robert L. Noble Prize (not to be confused with the Nobel Prize) is awarded each year by the Canadian Cancer Society to researchers whose contributions have led to a significant advance in cancer research. The prize consists of 2,000 Canadian dollars for the researcher receiving the prize, and an additional 20,000 Canadian dollars to further his/her cancer research.

It honours Robert L. Noble, a Canadian researcher who in the 1950s helped with the discovery of vincristine and vinblastine, widely used anti-cancer drugs.

== Recipients ==
Source: Canadian Cancer Society

- 2023 – Sheila Singh, Peter Dirks
- 2022 – Samuel Aparicio
- 2021 – Michael Taylor
- 2020 – Nada Jabado
- 2019 – Jerry Pelletier
- 2018 – Pamela Ohashi
- 2017 – Morag Park
- 2016 – Poul Sorensen
- 2014 – Rama Khokha and James T. Rutka
- 2013 – Shoukat Dedhar
- 2012 – Michel Tremblay
- 2011 – John Bell
- 2010 – Mitsu Ikura
- 2009 – Brian Wilson
- 2008 – Mark Henkelman
- 2007 – Dick Hill
- 2006 – Carol Cass
- 2005 – Susan Cole and Roger Deeley
- 2004 – Robert Kerbel
- 2003 – Connie Eaves
- 2002 – Nahum Sonenberg
- 2001 – Chris Bleackley
- 2000 – John Dick
- 1999 – Janet Rossant
- 1998 – Frank L. Graham
- 1997 – Alan Bernstein
- 1996 – Tak Wah Mak
- 1995 – Anthony J. Pawson
- 1994 – Victor Ling

== See also ==
- List of biomedical science awards
