= Lunenfeld-Tanenbaum Research Institute =

Canadian research institute

Coordinates: 43°39′27″N 79°23′22″W

- Established: 1985
- Research type: Medical
- Director of Research: Dr. Anne-Claude Gingras
- Location: 600 University Ave., Toronto, Ontario, Canada
- Affiliations: University of Toronto
- Operating agency: Sinai Health System
- Website: www.lunenfeld.ca

Former logo of the Institute

The Lunenfeld-Tanenbaum Research Institute is a medical research institute in Toronto, Ontario and part of the Sinai Health System. It was originally established in 1985 as the Samuel Lunenfeld Research Institute, the research arm of Mount Sinai Hospital, by an endowment from the Lunenfeld and Kunin families. It was renamed to the current name on June 24, 2013, after a $35 million donation from Larry and Judy Tanenbaum.

It comprises 36 principal investigators, has a budget of C$90 million (2005/6), and has over 200 trainees and approximately 600 staff. The institute conducts research into various forms of cancer (colon, breast, pancreatic, prostate, lung, etc.), neurological disorders and brain illnesses, women's and infants' health, diabetes, developmental biology, stem cell biology and tissue regeneration, mouse models of human disease, genomic medicine and systems biology. The institute has 100,000 sq ft (9,300 m^{2}) of space and is split between the main hospital and the Joseph and Wolf Lebovic Health Complex.

The Lunenfeld-Tanenbaum Research Institute is a world pioneer in the fields of Systems Biology, Diabetes, and Infectious Bowel Disease. Its Systems Biology team consistently ranked Top 5 worldwide. Researchers at the Lunenfeld have the highest per capita funding and citations in Canada.

The founding director was Louis Siminovitch (1984–1994), followed by Alan Bernstein (1995–2000), Janet Rossant and Anthony Pawson (2001–2002), Anthony Pawson (2002–2005), James Woodgett (2005–2021), and Stephen Lye (2021–).

== Funding ==
Researchers are supported by the Mount Sinai Hospital Foundation, donors and external funding sources including:

- Canada Foundation for Innovation
- Canadian Cancer Society
- Canadian Institutes of Health Research
- Genome Canada
- Lawson Health Research Institute
- March of Dimes
- National Institutes of Health
- Natural Sciences and Engineering Research Council
- Ontario Ministry of Health and Long-Term Care
- SickKids Foundation
- Susan G. Komen Breast Cancer Foundation
- Terry Fox Foundation
- University Health Network

== See also ==
- PolyAnalytik
