= Irina Burd =

Physician-scientist

Irina Burd, MD, PhD
- Education: Rutgers University Rutgers University Robert Wood Johnson Medical School Thomas Jefferson University University of Pennsylvania

Irina Burd is the Sylvan Frieman, MD Endowed Professor and Chair of the Department of Obstetrics, Gynecology & Reproductive Science at the University of Maryland in Baltimore, Maryland. She is known for her work on the mechanisms by which maternal infection and placental inflammation affect fetal neuroimmune and immune development.

== Education and career ==
Burd graduated from Rutgers University in 1995, and then earned a Ph.D. and M.D. from Rutgers University Robert Wood Johnson Medical School in 2003. In 2023 she was named the Sylvan Frieman, MD Endowed Professor of Obstetrics, Gynecology & Reproductive Sciences.

From 2021 until 2023 she was the president of the American Society for Reproductive Immunology, and in 2022 the society presented her with an award for distinguished service. In 2025, Dr. Burd became the president of the Society for Reproductive Investigation.

== Selected publications ==
- Burd, Irina D.; Nevadunsky, Nicole; Bachmann, Gloria (2006). "ORIGINAL RESEARCH—EDUCATION: Impact of Physician Gender on Sexual History Taking in a Multispecialty Practice". The Journal of Sexual Medicine. 3 (2): 194–200. doi:10.1111/j.1743-6109.2005.00168.x.
- Burd, Irina; Bentz, Amy I.; Chai, Jinghua; Gonzalez, Juan; Monnerie, Hubert; Le Roux, Peter D.; Cohen, Akiva S.; Yudkoff, Marc; Elovitz, Michal A. (2010). "Inflammation‐induced preterm birth alters neuronal morphology in the mouse fetal brain". Journal of Neuroscience Research. 88 (9): 1872–1881. doi:10.1002/jnr.22368. ISSN 0360-4012. PMC 2895318. PMID 20155801.
- Elovitz, Michal A.; Brown, Amy G.; Breen, Kelsey; Anton, Lauren; Maubert, Monique; Burd, Irina (2011). "Intrauterine inflammation, insufficient to induce parturition, still evokes fetal and neonatal brain injury". International Journal of Developmental Neuroscience. 29 (6): 663–671. doi:10.1016/j.ijdevneu.2011.02.011. ISSN 0736-5748. PMC 3140629. PMID 21382466.
- Burd, Irina; Balakrishnan, Bindu; Kannan, Sujatha (2012). "Models of Fetal Brain Injury, Intrauterine Inflammation, and Preterm Birth". American Journal of Reproductive Immunology. 67 (4): 287–294. doi:10.1111/j.1600-0897.2012.01110.x. ISSN 1046-7408.
- Vermillion, Meghan S.; Lei, Jun; Shabi, Yahya; Baxter, Victoria K.; Crilly, Nathan P.; McLane, Michael; Griffin, Diane E.; Pekosz, Andrew; Klein, Sabra L.; Burd, Irina (2017-02-21). "Intrauterine Zika virus infection of pregnant immunocompetent mice models transplacental transmission and adverse perinatal outcomes". Nature Communications. 8 (1). doi:10.1038/ncomms14575. ISSN 2041-1723. PMC 5321801. PMID 28220786.
