= Connie Eaves =

Canadian medical researcher (1944–2024)

Connie Jean Eaves OC FRSC FRS CorrFRSE
- Born: Constance Jean Halperin; May 22, 1944; Ottawa, Ontario, Canada
- Died: March 7, 2024 (aged 79)
- Education: Queen's University (BA),(MS); University of Manchester (PhD)
- Awards: FRSC; Royal Society of Canada (2008)
- Scientific career
- Fields: Medical genetics
- Institutions: University of British Columbia
- Website: University website

Constance Jean Eaves OC FRSC FRS CorrFRSE (née Halperin; May 22, 1944 – March 7, 2024) was a Canadian biologist with significant contributions to cancer and stem cell research. Eaves was a professor generics of genetics at the University of British Columbia and was also the co-founder with Allen C Eaves of Terry Fox Laboratory (Vancouver, Canada).

== Life and career ==
In high school, Eaves was interested in becoming a physician but later decided to pursue research due to gender discrimination in medical school acceptance rates.

Eaves received a BA in Biology and Chemistry and in 1964 and 1966 an MSc in biology (Genetics) working on oncogenic viruses from Queen's University. She then pursued doctoral training at the Paterson Laboratories of the Christie Hospital and Holt Radium Institute and obtained a PhD from the University of Manchester in Great Britain in 1969.

Eaves did postdoctoral work on hematopoiesis at the Ontario Cancer Institute in Toronto, Canada, as a member of the research team of James Till and Ernest McCulloch.

After completing her studies, moved to British Columbia because she was offered an academic position at the University of British Columbia.

Her contributions to the professional and scholarly community include acting as the editor-in-chief of the journal Experimental Hematology, in addition to serving as the president of the National Cancer Institute (Canada), the associate scientific director of the Canadian Stem Cell Network, and president of the International Society of Experimental Hematology.

Connie Eaves died on March 7, 2024, at the age of 79.

== Honors and recognition ==
- 1993, Fellow of the Royal Society of Canada
- 2003, Robert L. Noble Prize for Excellence in Cancer Research from the National Cancer Institute of Canada
- 2008, Donald Metcalf Lecture Award by the International Society for Experimental Hematology
- 2011, Canadian Blood Services' 2011 Lifetime Achievement Award.
- 2015, Corresponding Fellow of the Royal Society of Edinburgh
- 2016, Dr. Chew Wei Memorial Prize in Cancer Research from the University of British Columbia's Faculty of Medicine
- 2018, American Society of Hematology's E. Donnall Thomas Prize
- 2018, Tobias Award from the International Society for Stem Cell Research
- 2019, Canada Gairdner Wightman Award
- 2019, Inductee, Canadian Medical Hall of Fame
- 2021, Fellow of the Royal Society; Officer Order of Canada

Eaves was also a professor of Medical Genetics and an Associate Member of Medicine and Pathology & Laboratory Medicine at the University of British Columbia.

In recognition of the significant impact Drs. Connie and Allen Eaves have made on global cancer research and treatment over the past 50 years, the BC Cancer Foundation has unveiled the inauguration of the Eaves Stem Cell Assay Laboratory to honor their enduring legacy.
