= Tony Pawson (biochemist) =

British-Canadian scientist (1952–2013)

Tony Pawson CH OC OOnt FRS FRSC
- Born: Anthony James Pawson; 18 October 1952; Maidstone, England
- Died: 7 August 2013 (aged 60); Toronto, Ontario
- Education: Clare College, Cambridge; King's College London (PhD)
- Known for: Cellular signal transduction
- Awards: Gairdner Foundation International Award (1994); Flavelle Medal (1998); Louisa Gross Horwitz Prize (2004); Wolf Prize in Medicine (2005); Royal Medal (2005); Kyoto Prize (2008); Fellow of the Royal Society
- Scientific career
- Fields: Genetics, microbiology
- Workplaces: University of Toronto; Mount Sinai Hospital, Toronto; Samuel Lunenfeld Research Institute
- Thesis: Studies on the Proteins and Nucleic Acids of RNA Tumour Viruses (1976)

Anthony James Pawson (18 October 1952 – 7 August 2013) was a British-born Canadian genetic scientist. He was known and recognized for his work on cellular organization, including how cells respond to growth signals, and how they communicate with each other.

Pawson is the recipient of several notable awards such as Gairdner Foundation International Award, Wolf Prize in Medicine, Thomson Reuters Citation Laureates and Kyoto Prize.

== Biography ==
Pawson was born in Maidstone, England. He was the son of the sportsman and writer Tony Pawson, and botanist and high-school teacher Hilarie. He was the eldest of three children.

He studied at the Winchester College and Clare College, Cambridge, where he received an MA in biochemistry followed by a PhD from King's College London in 1976. From 1976 to 1980 he pursued postdoctoral work at the University of California, Berkeley. From 1981 to 1985, he was assistant professor in microbiology at the University of British Columbia.

Pawson was a Distinguished Investigator and former Director of Research at the Samuel Lunenfeld Research Institute of Mount Sinai Hospital and Professor in the Department of Molecular Genetics at the University of Toronto both of which he joined in 1985.

Pawson died on 7 August 2013 of unspecified causes at the age of 60.

== Research ==
Pawson's research changed the understanding of signal transduction, the molecular mechanisms by which cells respond to external cues, and how they communicate with each other. He identified the phosphotyrosine-binding Src homology 2 (SH2 domain) as the prototypic non-catalytic interaction module. SH2 domains serve as a model for a large family of protein modules that act together to control many aspects of cellular signalling. Since the discovery of SH2 domains, hundreds of different modules have been identified in many proteins.

== Honours and awards ==
- 1994 - Gairdner Foundation International Award
- 1994 - Fellow of the Royal Society of London and the Royal Society of Canada
- 1995 – Robert L. Noble Prize from the National Cancer Institute of Canada
- 1998 – Pezcoller-AACR International Award for Cancer Research
- 1998 – Heineken Prize for Biochemistry and Biophysics, Royal Netherlands Academy of Arts and Sciences
- 1998 – The Royal Society of Canada Flavelle Medal for meritorious achievement in biological science
- 2000 – J. Allyn Taylor International Prize in Medicine
- 2004 – Louisa Gross Horwitz Prize from Columbia University
- 2004 – Poulsson Medal, the Norwegian Society of Pharmacology and Toxicology
- 2004 – Associate of the National Academy of Sciences (US)
- 2004 – Member of the American Academy of Arts and Sciences
- 2005 – Wolf Prize in Medicine "for his discovery of protein domains essential for mediating protein-protein interactions in cellular signaling pathways, and the insights this research has provided into cancer"
- 2005 – The Royal Medal (The Queen's Medal) from The Royal Society of London
- 2006 – Member of the Order of the Companions of Honour
- 2007 – Premiers Summit Award
- 2007 – Howard Taylor Ricketts Award from University of Chicago
- 2008 Kyoto Prize – "Japan's Nobel" for "Proposing and Proving the Concept of Adapter Molecules in the Signal Transduction"
- 2012 – Clarivate Citation Laureate
- 2012 – Thomson Reuters Citation Laureates, candidate for Nobel Prize in Medicine "for identification of the phosphotyrosine binding SH2 domain and demonstrating its function in protein-protein interactions"
- 2013 – Annual award of the Canadian National Proteomics Network, thereafter named the CNPN-Tony Pawson Proteomics Award
