= Stemcell Technologies =

Technology company

STEMCELL Technologies
- Type: Private
- Industry: Biotechnology
- Founded: 1993; 33 years ago
- Founder: Allen Eaves
- Headquarters: Vancouver, British Columbia, Canada
- Key people: Allen Eaves, chairman and CEO
- Number of employees: > 2000
- Website: stemcell.com

StemCell Technologies Canada Inc. (formerly known as StemCell Technologies Inc.) is a Canadian biotechnology company that develops and manufactures cell culture media and cell separation technologies for use in stem cell, immunology, and cancer research.

The company has offices in the United States, Europe, Asia, and Australia with the headquarter being in Vancouver, British Columbia, Canada. Allen Eaves, the founder, currently serves as the president and CEO.

== History ==
Allen Eaves, a hematologist and cancer researcher, co-founded the Terry Fox Laboratory (TFL) in Vancouver with his wife, hematologist and cancer researcher Connie Eaves, in 1981. Allen Eaves’ research group at the TFL made their own standardized cell culture medium for growing hematopoietic stem cells in the lab. To help fund his blood cancer research program at the TFL, Eaves started selling this medium—named MethoCult—to other research groups around the world. Eaves purchased the business from TFL and launched Stemcell Technologies Inc. in 1993.

In 2018, Stemcell received a $45 million grant from the Canadian and British Columbian governments toward building an advanced biologicals manufacturing facility in Burnaby, British Columbia.

In 2021, Stemcell launched "The Immunology Podcast" about current scientific advances in the field of immunology with interviews of immunologists.
