= Frank L. Graham =

Canadian molecular biologist

Frank L. Graham is a Canadian biologist, having been a Distinguished University Professor at McMaster University.

Graham is the 1998 recipient of the Robert L. Noble Prize.

Graham has performed research on gene therapy.
