= Pirton =

Pirton may refer to:

- Pirton, Hertfordshire
- Pirton, Worcestershire

== See also ==
- Purton (disambiguation)
