= Victor Ling =

Canadian researcher

- Born: 1943 (age 82–83); Shanghai, China
- Education: University of Toronto
- Known for: Discovery of P-glycoprotein

Chinese name
- Traditional Chinese: 林重慶
- Hanyu Pinyin: Lín Chóngqìng
- Teochew Peng'im: Lim^{5} Cong^{5}-kêng^{3}

Victor Ling, OC OBC (林重慶; born 1943) is a Canadian researcher in the field of medicine. Ling's research focuses on drug resistance in cancer. He is best known for his discovery of P-glycoprotein, one of the proteins responsible for multidrug resistance.

== Early life ==
Ling was born in Shanghai, China in 1943, and is of Teochew ancestry. He moved to Hong Kong with his family in 1949 and lived there until 1952, when they emigrated to Canada. He graduated from North Toronto Collegiate in 1962. He received his bachelor's degree in 1966 from the University of Toronto and his PhD in 1969 from the University of British Columbia.

== Career ==
Ling undertook post-doctoral training with Nobel laureate Fred Sanger at Cambridge University before returning to Toronto. He is currently Assistant Dean of the Faculty of Medicine at the University of British Columbia and former vice-president, Discovery at the BC Cancer Agency in Vancouver, British Columbia, as well as the President and Scientific Director of the Terry Fox Research Institute.

== Honours ==
- 1990, awarded the Gairdner Award from the Gairdner Foundation for outstanding contributions to medical science
- 1991, awarded the Charles F. Kettering Prize
- 1991, awarded the Steiner Award, the highest honour in cancer research
- 1994, awarded the Robert L. Noble Prize by the National Cancer Institute of Canada
- 2000, appointed to the Order of British Columbia
- 2006, awarded an honorary doctorate from Trinity Western University
- 2008, made an Officer of the Order of Canada
