= Louise Purton =

Australian biologist

Louise E. Purton
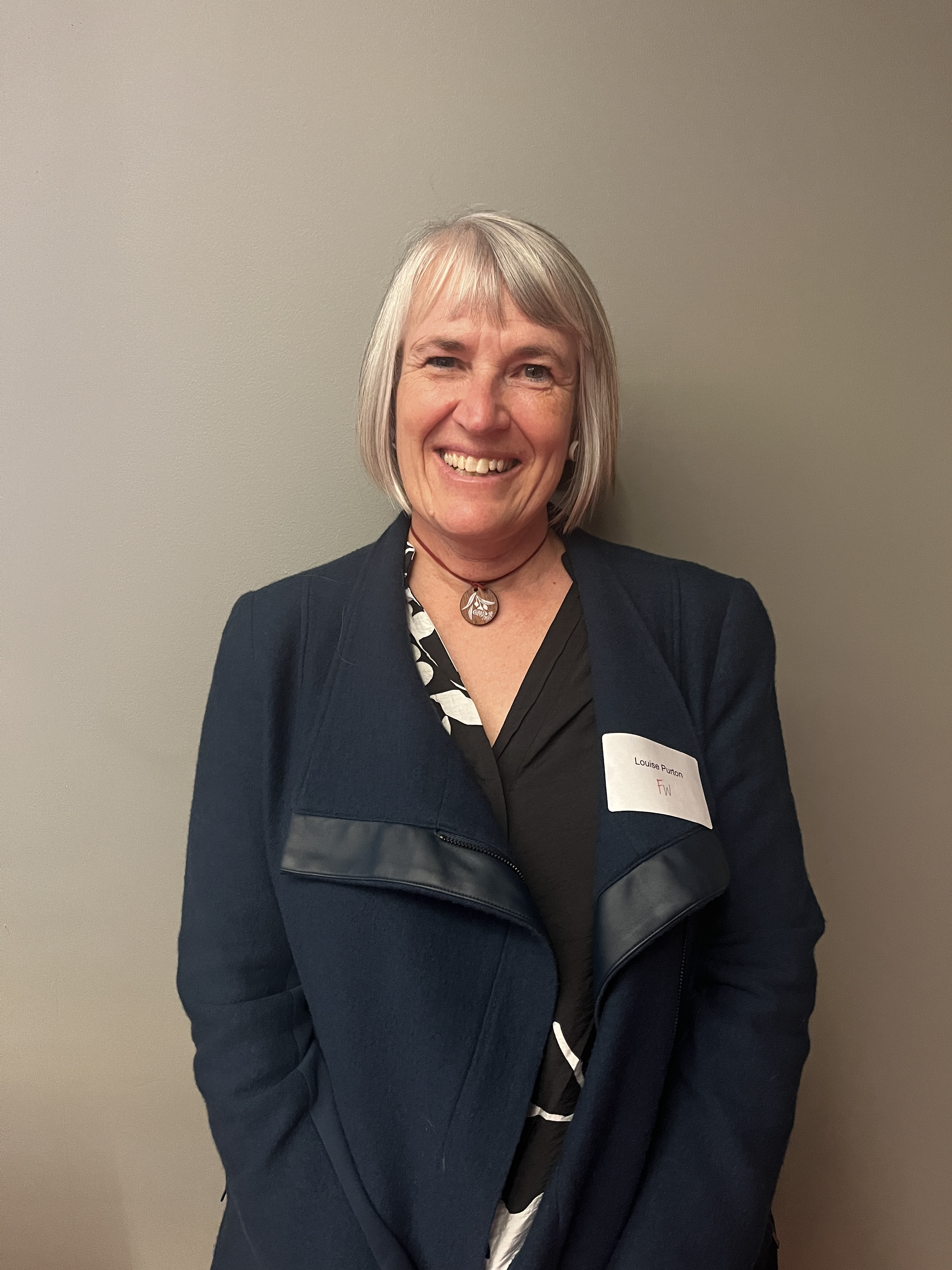
- Purton in 2025
- Education: University of Melbourne
- Scientific career
- Workplaces: Fred Hutchinson Cancer Research Center; Peter MacCallum Cancer Centre; Harvard University; Massachusetts General Hospital
- Thesis: Characterisation studies of the stromal cell types present in bone marrow (1994)

Louise E. Purton is president-elect of ISEH - International Society of Experimental Haematology, an Australian biologist who is Professor of Medicine and head of the Stem Cell Regulation Laboratory at St. Vincent's Institute of Medical Research in Melbourne. Her research considers the stem cells responsible for the production of blood cells and the regulations of haematopoietic diseases. She was awarded the International Society for Experimental Hematology McCulloch & Till Award in 2022. She has experienced profound bilateral hearing loss since the age of three and has been recognised for her work supporting Equity and Diversity, particularly amongst women and people with disability, and is a member of the AAMRI Gender, Equity and Diversity and Inclusion group GEDI.

== Early life and education ==
Purton was raised in Balranald, New South Wales. At age three she became profoundly deaf after experiencing a life-threatening illness. She had Cochlear implants inserted in 2018 and 2021. Purton was an undergraduate student at the University of Melbourne. She remained there for doctoral research, where she studied the stroll cell types in bone marrow. She moved to the United States for postdoctoral research, where she worked at the Fred Hutchinson Cancer Research Center and identified that the all-trans retinoic acid enhances the renewal of hematopoietic stem cells. She returned to Australia in 2000, when she studied the roles of various retinoic acid receptors and their roles on haematopoiesis. She showed that self-renewal is regulated by Retinoic acid receptor gamma, and loss of this receptor has intrinsic and extrinsic impacts on haematopoiesis. She returned to America in 2004, where she studied cells in the bone marrow microenvironment and how they could regulate myeloproliferative-like disorders.

== Research and career ==
Purton's research is focused on processes involved in blood cell production (haematopoietic stem cells (HSCs).

In 2008 Purton returned to Australia, where she launched the St. Vincent's Institute of Medical Research Stem Cell Regulation Unity. She investigates the processes involved in haematopoiesis, the production of blood cells. These processes involve hematopoietic stem cells, which can either self-renew or differentiate into more mature types. Issues surrounding the regulation of hematopoietic stem cells can lead to diseases such as leukaemia. Purton investigates the roles of retinoic acid receptors in haematopoiesis. She makes use of mouse models, cell assays and gene transduction. Through these studies, she identified how blood cells are produced in bone marrow, which can impact the downstream treatment of blood cancer.

Purton has studied the role of Homeobox A1 (HOXA1) in myelodysplastic syndrome (MDS), a blood cell disease that results in bone marrow failure. Around 30% of patients with MDS progress to acute myeloid leukaemia, and the only treatment is hematopoietic stem cell transplantation. She identified that altered HOXA1 genes impact the ability of haematopoietic stem cells.

Purton was appointed Associate Editor of Experimental Hematology in 2020.

== Awards and honours ==
- 2011 National Health and Medical Research Council Senior Research Fellowship
- 2016 SVI Foundation Award
- 2019 University of Melbourne Professorial Fellow
- 2022 International Society for Experimental Hematology McCulloch & Till Award
- 2022 Chair, ASH Scientific Committee on Stem Cells and Regenerative Medicine.
- 2023 Member, Scientific Program Committee, International Society for Experimental Hematology, Member, ASH Committee for Scientific Affairs.
- 2023 ISEH award for Leadership in Diversity, Equity and Inclusion.
- 2026 ISEH - elected president.

== Academic service ==
Purton has worked to improve diversity within the scientific community. She identified and publicised inequality in the rates of funding for men and women in Australia. For example, she identified that the National Health and Medical Research Council awarded men 23% more grants ($95 million more funding) than their female counterparts. She worked with Jessica Borger to launch a petition calling for a strategic overhaul of the NHMRC funding body.

== Selected publications ==
- Carl R Walkley; Gemma Haines Olsen; Sebastian Dworkin; et al. (1 June 2007). "A microenvironment-induced myeloproliferative syndrome caused by retinoic acid receptor gamma deficiency". Cell. 129 (6): 1097–1110. doi:10.1016/j.cell.2007.05.014. ISSN 0092-8674. PMC 1974882. PMID 17574023. Wikidata Q35987653.
- Carl R Walkley; Jeremy M Shea; Natalie A. Sims; Louise E Purton; Stuart H Orkin (1 June 2007). "Rb regulates interactions between hematopoietic stem cells and their bone marrow microenvironment". Cell. 129 (6): 1081–1095. doi:10.1016/j.cell.2007.03.055. ISSN 0092-8674. PMC 2768301. PMID 17574022. Wikidata Q41883433.
- B. Varnum-Finney; L. E. Purton; M. Yu; et al. (1 June 1998). "The Notch ligand, Jagged-1, influences the development of primitive hematopoietic precursor cells". Blood. 91 (11): 4084–4091. ISSN 0006-4971. PMID 9596653. Wikidata Q42829850.
