= Experimental Hematology =

- Discipline: Hematology
- Language: English
- Edited by: Connie J. Eaves

Publication details
- History: 1972–present
- Publisher: Elsevier
- Frequency: Monthly
- Impact factor: 3.084 (2020)

Standard abbreviations
- ISO 4: Exp. Hematol.

Indexing
- CODEN: EXHMA6
- ISSN: 0301-472X
- OCLC no.: 43350423

Links
- Journal homepage; Online access

Experimental Hematology is a peer-reviewed medical journal of hematology, which publishes original research articles and reviews, as well as the abstracts of the annual proceedings of the Society for Hematology and Stem Cells (formerly known as the International Society for Experimental Hematology). The journal is published monthly by Elsevier, and the annual proceedings are published in a supplement issue. The journal is edited by Connie J. Eaves.

== Abstracting and indexing ==
The journal is abstracted and indexed in:

- BIOSIS
- Chemical Abstracts
- Current Contents
- EMBASE
- MEDLINE
- Scopus
