= American Journal of Reproductive Immunology =

- Discipline: Immunology, reproductive biology
- Language: English
- Edited by: Gil Mor

Publication details
- Former name(s): American Journal of Reproductive Immunology and Microbiology
- History: 1980–present
- Publisher: Wiley-Blackwell
- Frequency: Monthly
- Impact factor: 2.668 (2013)

Standard abbreviations
- ISO 4: Am. J. Reprod. Immunol.

Indexing
- CODEN: AAJID8
- ISSN: 1046-7408 (print); 1600-0897 (web)

Links
- Journal homepage; Online access; Online archive

The American Journal of Reproductive Immunology is a monthly peer-reviewed medical journal covering reproductive biology and immunology. It was established in 1980 under its current name. From 1985 to 1988 it was published under the name American Journal of Reproductive Immunology and Microbiology. It is the official journal of the American Society for Reproductive Immunology. It is published by Wiley-Blackwell and the editor-in-chief is Gil Mor (Yale University School of Medicine). According to the Journal Citation Reports, the journal has a 2013 impact factor of 2.668.
