= Andras Nagy =

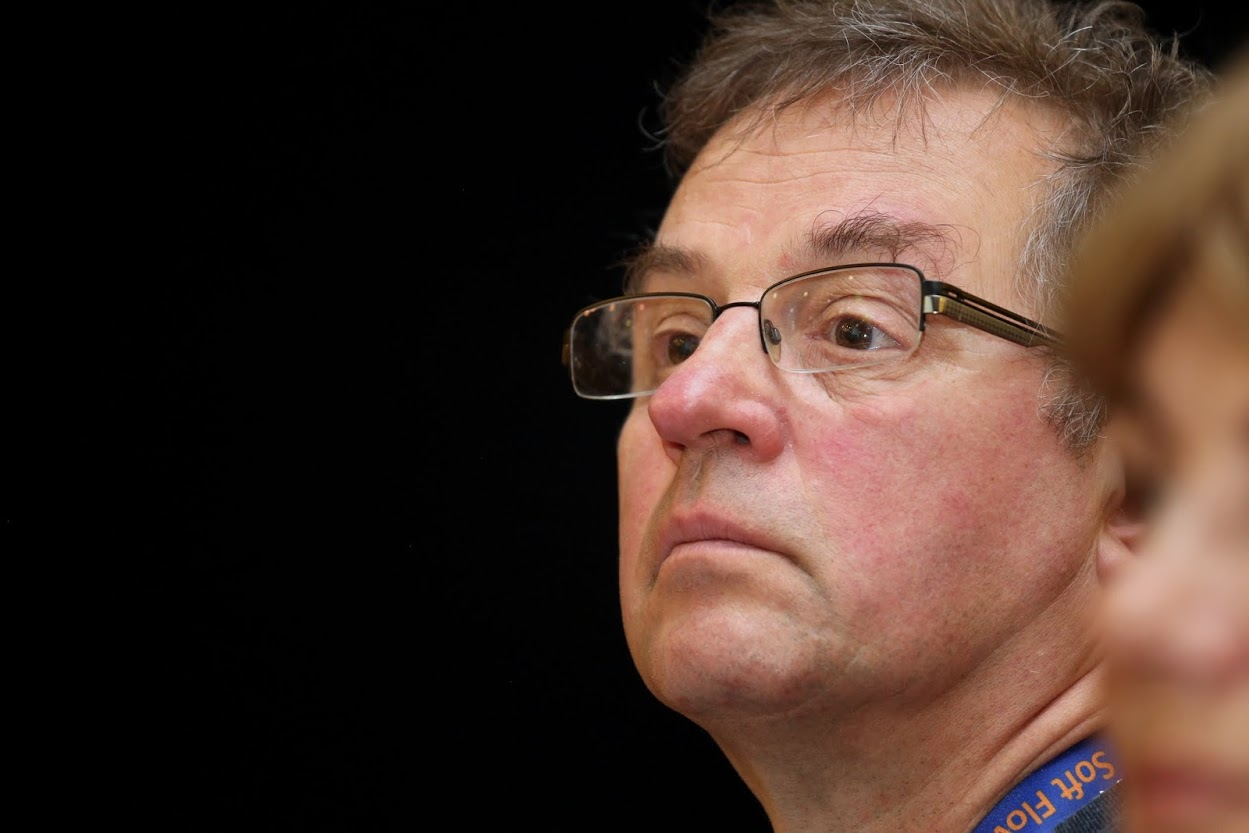
- András Nagy, 2015
- Born: Hungary
- Occupation: research scientist
- Spouse: Kristina

Andras Nagy is a research scientist at the Lunenfeld-Tanenbaum Research Institute at Mount Sinai Hospital in Toronto, Ontario. He heads a team of 50 researchers on Project Grandiose, who study the process of creating stem cells. Nagy holds a Canadian Research Chair in stem cells and regeneration.

Nagy was born in Hungary, and moved to Canada from Hungary in 1989, joining the Institute after a three-month stint as a visiting scientist.

In 2005, Nagy was the first to create new human embryonic stem cell lines in Canada.

In 2009, he demonstrated how cells could be changed into stem cells more without the introduction of potentially damaging viruses, and was included that year in Scientific American's Top 10 Honor Roll.

Nagy and his research group have discovered a new type of stem cell, called the F-Class iPS cell.

In 2014, Project Grandiose researchers have produced several major reports, demonstrating advances in stem cell creation which are expected to lead to improved treatments for a number of diseases, and which have been published in Nature and Nature Communications.

Nagy holds an Adjunct Professorship at Monash University.
