= American Society for Reproductive Immunology =

US-based organization of scientists interested in reproductive immunology

- Founded: 1981
- Purpose: Reproductive Immunology
- Members: 200
- Key people: Irina Burd, MD, PhD, President
- Website: Official Website

The American Society for Reproductive Immunology, or ASRI, is a US-based organization of scientists from around the world interested in reproductive immunology. It was founded in 1981 and is the oldest society of its kind. Its official scientific journal is the American Journal of Reproductive Immunology.

ASRI encompasses scientists in areas of study such as molecular biology, microbiology, mucosal immunology, genetics, pediatrics, infectious diseases, endocrinology, obstetrics, gynecology, pathology, veterinary medicine and animal science. The ASRI brings together clinicians and basic scientists to discuss contemporary topics in reproductive immunology.

ASRI objectives are achieved in two ways. First, the society is the official sponsor of the American Journal of Reproductive Immunology, which is one of two journals devoted to publishing reproductive immunology research. Prior to the founding of the journal, there were no publishing outlets specifically oriented towards reproductive immunology. Secondly, the society has held an annual meeting since its inception in 1981 to promote exchange of scientific information and to foster mentorship. The abstracts from these meetings are published as a part of the American Journal of Reproductive Immunology and many of the plenary papers are included in the journal as well.
