= Charles Eaves =

Canadian scientist (1908–2006)

Charles Eaves (1908–2006) was a Canadian scientist who extended the storage of apples by controlling levels of oxygen and carbon dioxide. He built the first controlled atmosphere (CA) storage in the Western Hemisphere in 1939 at Port Williams in Nova Scotia. After World War II his research at the Kentville Experimental Farm established storage methods that were adopted worldwide. He later advanced fruit storage in Turkey and Brazil for the United Nations and in 2000 was awarded an honorary doctorate by the Nova Scotia Agricultural College and Dalhousie University.

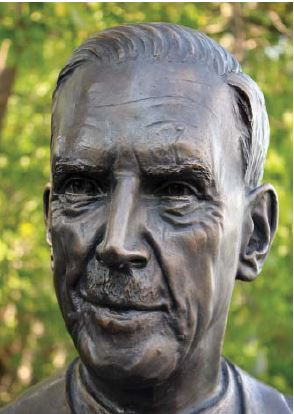
"Dr. Apple" sculpture of Charles Eaves

== Early life ==
Charles Eaves was born in Liverpool, England on February 21, 1908. His mother, Amy Elizabeth (née Potts), died at his birth. His father, Frank Albert Eaves, a marine engineer specializing in propeller design, died following a workplace injury shortly thereafter. Eaves' guardians placed the sickly 2 year old in the country with the family of a gentle basket weaver. During the First World War, at age 8, he was sent to boarding school - a move he found difficult. However, there he discovered a fondness for music, poetry and theatre – and roles in school plays made classes bearable. Eaves graduated from school at age 14, but unable to find work his guardians insisted he go 'on the dole'. This instilled a lifelong empathy for others in need. Later, as a junior shipping clerk, he entered a Canadian Pacific Steamship office where a striking poster beckoned "Public School Boys Wanted – to learn farming in Canada". In March 1926, after a rough Atlantic crossing, 18-year-old Eaves entered Macdonald College of McGill University, where he fell in love with Canadian optimism. He learned numerous farming methods and completed the 2 year diploma course in 1928. To earn money to continue his college education, Eaves joined the last major harvest excursion to Western Canada. There he witnessed one of the first, labour-saving, combine harvesters in action.

== Scientific career ==
Eaves completed his BSc. in agricultural science at McGill University in 1932 with summer employment at the Ottawa Experimental Farm. In 1933 the IODE awarded him a one-year scholarship to study plant nutrition and produce storage at Cambridge University in England. Upon his return to Canada he reunited with Margot Vernon Smith from Ottawa and they married in 1934. Accepting a temporary position at the Experimental Farm in Kentville, Eaves was made responsible for produce storage. After earning his MSc from McGill in 1937, he returned to work full-time at the Experimental Farm in Kentville.

In 1939 Eaves established the first atmospherically controlled fruit and vegetable storage facility in the Western Hemisphere. However, later that year, with the Second World War imminent and with his daughter Elizabeth a year old, Eaves enlisted in the Canadian Army. He saw his newborn son Allen briefly before shipping overseas in 1941. Throughout the Italian campaign and the liberation of The Netherlands, Eaves was admired, stalwart and lucky. In 1945 following the War, he worked initially at the Ottawa Experimental Farm, but returned to Kentville and his beloved apples in 1948. There he enjoyed a long distinguished research career, but also remained active in the militia, serving as Colonel of the West Nova Scotia Regiment (1957–60).

== Retirement ==
Mandatory retirement in 1973 resulted in Eaves working for the United Nations' Food and Agricultural Organization and travelling to establish post-harvest physiology laboratories in Yalova Turkey (1972–73) and Salvador, Brazil (1973–74). He then returned to Upper Canard and for another 25 years was an active volunteer for many educational and community causes. On October 25, 2000, he received an honorary doctorate from Dalhousie University and the Nova Scotia Agricultural College. Eaves died at age 98 on July 2, 2006, and was buried in St. John's churchyard near Upper Canard.

== Early mentors ==
Eaves transferred from the Central Agricultural Research Centre in Ottawa to Kentville, Nova Scotia in 1934 to develop cool temperature apple storage. He had studied plant nutrition and storage research in Ottawa under Dr. W. Macoun and Dr. M. Davis, and had recently returned from the Low Temperature Research Station in Cambridge, England where Dr. F. Kidd and Dr. C. West were studying the physiology of fruit in controlled-atmosphere (CA) storage.

== From cool to controlled atmosphere ==
In Kentville, Eaves quickly established research trials in cool temperature storage. Over 3 million barrels of apples were exported annually to England, but without pre-cooling spoilage was a major concern. Eaves developed the concept of rapidly cooling picked apples, then storing them in a controlled atmosphere. In 1936, George Chase, a forward thinking apple grower and shipper, asked Eaves to accompany a 200-foot refrigerated Danish banana boat leaving Port Williams for England with 1200 barrels of apples. Eaves recorded temperature and carbon dioxide in the barrels each day of a stormy 13-day passage. Eaves knew that cooling and elevated carbon dioxide levels would reduce the metabolic rate of the apples and slow the ripening process. On arrival in England, the apples had retained their quality and commanded a premium price.

== First CA storage ==
In 1939, under Eaves' direction, the first CA storage facility in the Western Hemisphere was constructed in Port Williams. Following the Second World War, Eaves returned to Kentville to continue his innovative work in atmospheric storage. By the 1950s, common practice had apples stored in refrigerated rooms lined with gas-impermeable aluminum foil sealed with Vaseline. Recommended storage conditions were 3.5 degrees Celsius, 7% carbon dioxide and 14% oxygen in which apples could be kept in good condition for 6 months. Since regular atmosphere is about 21% oxygen and <1% carbon dioxide and the respiration of the fruit adds 1 mole of carbon dioxide for every mole of oxygen produced, the combined value of oxygen and carbon dioxide will equal 21% in a sealed storage room of fruit, if only respiration is allowed to alter the room atmosphere. Once carbon dioxide increased above 7%, the benefits began to disappear as carbon dioxide toxicity began to occur. However, controlling carbon dioxide levels meant flushing with outside air or using expensive caustic soda, a skin and eye irritant.

== Unexpected breakthrough ==
In 1951, to study the benefits of controlled atmosphere further, Eaves collaborated in the construction of a commercial storage room at Scotian Gold Cooperative in Coldbrook, Nova Scotia. To make the room airtight as possible it had a floor of iron sheeting, covered with mylar and topped by 5 cm of cement to prevent damage. Surprisingly, a few days after the room was filled with apples and sealed, carbon dioxide failed to accumulate. Eaves and his technician, Harold Lightfoot, were delighted and quickly concluded that the cement had absorbed the carbon dioxide. They had realized that the fresh concrete contained Ca (OH)_{2} which reacted with carbon dioxide to form CaCO_{3}, a.k.a. limestone, in the concrete, (Ca(OH)_{2} + CO_{2} → CaCO_{3} + H_{2}O), thereby removing the excess CO_{2} from the room atmosphere! A switch to using bagged, powdered hydrated lime as the most effective, cheap and safe means to lower carbon dioxide was immediately adopted worldwide and is still practiced. The use of hydrated lime to scrub carbon dioxide was re-discovered 40 years later by scientists who were not acquainted with Eaves' innovative discovery. in the early 1990s an enclosed Biodome was designed by highly-knowledgeable scientists and constructed in Arizona to simulate living in a space colony. There were several problems including a 'mysterious' disappearance of carbon dioxide gas from the Biodome atmosphere. Severinghaus et al. (1994), apparently unaware of Eaves' research, describe how they used isotopic analysis to discover that the carbon dioxide was being sequestered in the new concrete of the Biodome.

== CA storage to plant nutrition ==
During the next 20 years, Eaves focused his research on how CA storage and plant nutrition, affects the quality of stored fruit, in particular, demonstrating the benefits of using very low oxygen (<1%) concentrations. Eaves' ideas on CA storage were used to improve the shipping of bananas, strawberries, blueberries and vegetables. His pioneering work on CA storage was acknowledged at the 1970 International Horticultural Congress in Tel Aviv, Israel, where he was invited to give the keynote post-harvest lecture.

== Dr. Apple sculpture ==
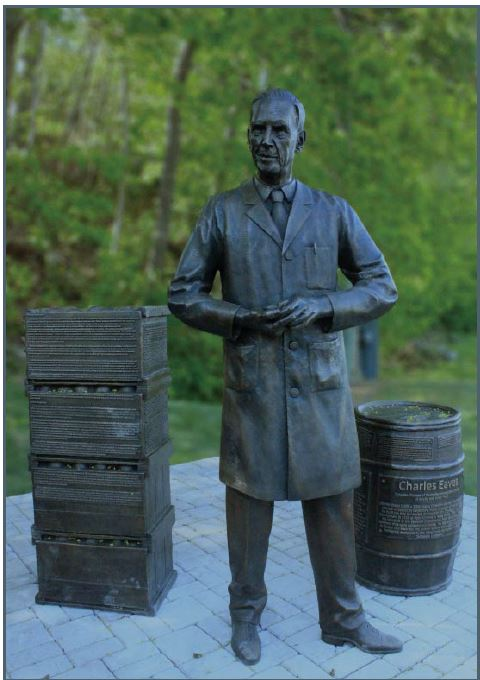
Dr. Apple sculpture including all three pieces: Charles Eaves, apple barrel with plaque, and stacked apple crates.

"Dr. Apple" is a sculpture of Eaves by Ruth Abernethy. The sculpture consists of the bronze figure, apple barrels and stacked apple crates. The barrels and crates have inscribed plates describing the Eaves' research. The sculpture was commissioned by Allen Eaves to commemorate his father's work at the Kentville Agriculture Centre that extended the storage life of apples and other fruit. Dr. Apple was unveiled by the Mayor of Kentville, David Corkum, on Friday May 29, 2015 at the park opposite the entrance to the Atlantic Food and Horticulture Research Centre, Main Street, Kentville Nova Scotia. This park area will now be known as "Eaves Hollow."
