= NMR in Biomedicine =

- Discipline: Medical imaging
- Language: English
- Edited by: John R. Griffiths

Publication details
- History: 1988-present
- Publisher: John Wiley & Sons
- Frequency: Monthly
- Open access: Hybrid
- Impact factor: 4.044 (2020)

Standard abbreviations
- ISO 4: NMR Biomed.

Indexing
- CODEN: NMRBEF
- ISSN: 0952-3480 (print); 1099-1492 (web)

Links
- Journal homepage; Online access

NMR in Biomedicine is a monthly peer-reviewed medical journal published since 1988 by John Wiley & Sons. It publishes original full-length papers, rapid communications, and review articles in which magnetic resonance spectroscopy or imaging methods are used to investigate physiological, biochemical, biophysical, or medical problems. The current editor-in-chief is John R. Griffiths (Cancer Research UK).

== Highest cited articles ==
The following articles have been cited most frequently:

1. "The basis of anisotropic water diffusion in the nervous system - a technical review", 15 (7-8) Nov-Dec 2002: 435–455, Beaulieu C.
2. "A review of chemical issues in H-1-NMR spectroscopy - n-acetyl-l-aspartate, creatine and choline", 4 (2) Apr 1991: 47–52, Miller BL.
3. "Fiber tracking: principles and strategies - a technical review", 15 (7-8) Nov-Dec 2002: 468–480, DMori S, van Zijl PCM.
4. "Inferring microstructural features and the physiological state of tissues from diffusion-weighted images", 8 (7-8) Nov-Dec 1995: 333–344, Basser PJ.

== Abstracting and indexing ==
NMR in Biomedicine is abstracted and indexed in:

- Elsevier BIOBASE
- Biochemistry & Biophysics Citation Index
- Biotechnology & Bioengineering Abstracts
- Chemical Abstracts Service
- ChemWeb
- Compendex
- CSA Biological Sciences Database
- Current Contents/Life Sciences
- Embase
- Index Medicus/MEDLINE
- Inspec
- PASCAL
- Science Citation Index
- Scopus

According to the Journal Citation Reports, the journal has a 2014 impact factor of 3.044, ranking it 9th out of 44 journals in the category "Spectroscopy", 24th out of 125 journals in the category "Radiology Nuclear Medicine & Medical Imaging", and 27th out of 73 journals in the category "Biophysics".
