= Society for Hematology and Stem Cells =

The International Society for Experimental Hematology (formerly the Society for Hematology and Stem Cells ) is a learned society which deals with hematology, the study of the blood system and its diseases, including those caused by exposure to nuclear radiation. It was founded in 1950, and held its first official meeting in Milwaukee in 1972. Its mission statement is: "To promote the scientific knowledge and clinical application of basic hematology, immunology, stem cell research, cell and gene therapy and related aspects of research through publications, discussions, scientific meetings and the support of young investigators."

The society has an official journal, Experimental Hematology.

At the opening ceremony of the 30th annual meeting of ISEH, Emperor Akihito of Japan praised the "remarkable results obtained by the ISEH today in the treatment of radiation-related disorders", by contrast to the lack of any effective treatment for such disorders in 1945 when atomic bombs were dropped on Hiroshima and Nagasaki.
