= Derek van der Kooy =

Derek van der Kooy (born 1952), Fellow of Royal Society of Canada, is professor in the department of medical genetics and microbiology at the University of Toronto. He received a master's degree in psychology at the University of British Columbia and a Ph.D. in anatomy from Erasmus University in 1978, as well as in the department of anatomy at the University of Toronto in 1980. Van der Kooy gained postdoctoral research experience at Cambridge University and at the Salk Institute in California. In 2021 van der Kooy was elected to the Academy of Science Royal Society of Canada.

In 1981, he became an assistant professor, was promoted to associate professor in 1986, and has served as professor in the department of anatomy and cell biology at the University of Toronto from 1991 until 2002, when he became a professor in the department of medical genetics and microbiology. His lab is the Neurobiology Research Group.

His lab in the Terrence Donnelly Centre for Cellular and Biomolecular Research carries out various neuroscience and developmental biology research projects. In 1994 his paper on neural stem cells in the adult mammalian forebrain was published in the journal Neuron. This work first established that adult mammalian neural stem cells were located in the subependyma of the forebrain lateral ventricle, where two types of lineage related precursor cells, progenitor cells and stem cells, were shown to be present. Proliferation of these cell types were characterized in further experiments that were reported in articles in Development and the Journal of Neuroscience. Of note, van der Kooy's lab produced the first report of stem cells in the adult mammalian eye, published in 2000 in Science. Further work, which was published in the journal, Neuron, 2001, documented how embryonic stem cells were shown to differentiate directly to neural stem cells through a default mechanism. Van der Kooy's lab continues to investigate the nature of stem cells, embryonic and adult, the concept of immortal cells, and the differentiation of embryonic stem cells, capable of forming any tissue in the body, to neural stem cells.

A report published in Science by van der Kooy's research group demonstrated that BDNF, when infused into the ventral tegmental area (VTA), can induce an opiate-dependent-like reward state in animals in the absence of opiate administration.

Previous studies have demonstrated that the opiate reward is mediated by a dopamine-independent reward system in nondependent animals, and by a dopamine-dependent reward system in dependent animals. In the present study, infusions of BDNF into the VTA were able to shift opiate reward from a dopamine-independent system to a dopamine-dependent system. This switch is mediated through a specific change in GABA-A receptors in the VTA from inhibitory to excitatory signaling in response to increased BDNF.

This work suggests that BDNF may play a critical role in mediating the shift to a drug-dependent motivational state, a crucial step in the pathogenesis of drug addiction.

Based on his experiments with human cadaveric pancreata, van der Kooy holds theorizes that there exists an adult stem cell in the pancreas.
