= Stem Cell Network =

Canadian research medicine non-profit organization

The Stem Cell Network (SCN) is a Canadian non-profit that supports stem cell and regenerative medicine research, teaches the next generation of highly qualified personal, and delivers outreach activities across Canada. The Network has been supported by the Government of Canada, since inception in 2001. SCN has catalyzed 25 clinical trials, 21 start-up companies, incubated several international and Canadian research networks and organizations, and established the Till & McCulloch Meetings, Canada's foremost stem cell research event.

The organization is based in Ottawa, Ontario.

== Activities ==
=== Annual Scientific Conference ===
Since 2001, SCN has hosted an annual scientific conference. This conference is open to SCN investigators and trainees, and provides a forum to share new research. The conference takes place in a different Canadian city each year. In 2012, the annual conference was re-branded as the Till & McCulloch Meetings. The establishment of the Meetings ensured that the country's stem cell and regenerative medicine research community would continue to have a venue for collaboration and the sharing of important research. The Till & McCulloch Meetings are Canada's largest stem cell and regenerative medicine conference.

=== Training ===
The SCN training program includes studentships, fellowships, research grants and workshops. Since 2001, SCN has offered training opportunities to more than 5,000 trainees.

== Organization ==
=== Member institutions ===
SCN and its membership engage in collaborative funding and research activities. Current members institutions include:

- Dalhousie University
- Hôpital Maisonneuve-Rosemont
- Hospital for Sick Children
- Institut de recherches cliniques de Montréal
- Jewish General Hospital
- Lawson Health Research Institute
- Lunenfeld-Tanenbaum Research Institute
- McGill University
- McMaster University
- Memorial University of Newfoundland
- Montreal Heart Institute
- Ottawa Hospital Research Institute
- Queen's University
- Robarts Research Institute
- Simon Fraser University
- Sunnybrook Health Sciences Centre
- Unity Health Toronto
- Université de Montréal
- Université de Sherbrooke
- Université Laval
- University Health Network
- University of Alberta
- University of British Columbia
- University of Calgary
- University of Guelph
- University of Lethbridge
- University of Manitoba
- University of Ottawa
- University of Ottawa Heart Institute
- University of Regina
- University of Saskatchewan
- University of Toronto
- University of Victoria
- University of Waterloo
- University of Western Ontario
- York University

=== Partners ===
- AstraZeneca
- BC Cancer Agency
- BC Children's Hospital Foundation
- California Institute for Regenerative Medicine
- Canadian Cancer Society
- Canadian Medical Association
- Canadian Institutes of Health Research
- College of Physicians and Surgeons of Alberta
- Convatec
- Heart and Stroke Foundation of Canada
- Innovate BC
- International Society for Stem Cell Research
- JDRF
- Let's Talk Science
- Miltenyi Biotec
- Mitacs Canada
- Multiple Sclerosis Society of Canada
- Muscular Dystrophy Canada
- Novartis
- Ontario Institute for Cancer Research
- The Ottawa Hospital Foundation
- St. Paul's Hospital Foundation
- Stemcell Technologies
- St. Jude Medical
- Truth in Advertising
