= Ernest McCulloch =

Canadian cellular biologist (1926–2011)

Ernest Armstrong McCulloch OC OOnt FRS FRSC
- Born: 27 April 1926; Toronto, Ontario, Canada
- Died: 19 January 2011 (aged 84); Toronto, Ontario, Canada
- Education: University of Toronto; Lister Institute
- Known for: stem cells
- Awards: Albert Lasker Award for Basic Medical Research; Canada Gairdner International Award
- Scientific career
- Fields: Cell biology
- Workplaces: Ontario Cancer Institute; University of Toronto
- Doctoral students: Anne Croy

Ernest Armstrong McCulloch OC OOnt FRS FRSC (27 April 1926 – 20 January 2011) was a University of Toronto cellular biologist, best known for demonstrating – in a partnership with James Till – the existence of stem cells.

== Biography ==
McCulloch was born in Toronto, Ontario, Canada on 27 April 1926, and was educated at Upper Canada College and the University of Toronto.

Ernest McCulloch received his MD in 1948 from the University of Toronto. Upon graduation, he began his education in research at the Lister Institute in London, England.

In 1957 he joined the newly formed Ontario Cancer Institute, where the majority of his research focused on normal blood-formation and leukaemia. Together with his colleague, Dr. J.E. Till, McCulloch created the first quantitative, clonal method to identify stem cells and used this technique for pioneering studies on stem cells. His experience in hematology, when combined with Till's experience in biophysics, yielded a novel and productive combination of skills and interests.

In the early 1960s, McCulloch, and Till started a series of experiments that involved injecting bone marrow cells into irradiated mice. Visible nodules were observed in the spleens of the mice, in proportion to the number of bone marrow cells injected. Till and McCulloch called the nodules 'spleen colonies', and speculated that each nodule arose from a single marrow cell: perhaps a stem cell.

In later work, Till & McCulloch were joined by graduate student Andy Becker, and demonstrated that each nodule did indeed arise from a single cell. They published their results in Nature in 1963. In the same year, in collaboration with Lou Siminovitch, a trailblazing Canadian molecular biologist, they obtained evidence that these cells were capable of self-renewal, a crucial aspect of the functional definition of stem cells that they had formulated.

McCulloch's later research was on cellular and molecular mechanisms affecting the growth of malignant blast stem cells obtained from the blood of patients with Acute Myeloblastic Leukemia.

In 1969, McCulloch won the Canada Gairdner International Award with James E. Till in recognition of their development of the spleen colony technique for measuring the capacity of primitive normal and neoplastic cells to multiply and differentiate in the body. This technique has been applied by them and their colleagues, and by many others, to gain important knowledge of the normal formation of blood cells, the behavior of leukemic cells and methods of treating leukemia, and other aspects of cell biology.

In 1974, McCulloch became a Fellow of the Royal Society of Canada. In 1988, he became an Officer of the Order of Canada and was made a member of the Order of Ontario in 2006. In 1999, he was elected a Fellow of the Royal Society. In 2004, McCulloch was inducted into the Canadian Medical Hall of Fame. He holds the distinguished title of University Professor Emeritus at the University of Toronto.

In 2005, he and James Till were awarded the Albert Lasker Award for Basic Medical Research.

== Selected publications ==
- McCulloch, E.A.; Till, J.E. (1960). "The radiation sensitivity of normal mouse bone marrow cells, determined by quantitative marrow transplantation into irradiated mice". Radiation Research. 13 (1): 115–125. Bibcode:1960RadR...13..115M. doi:10.2307/3570877. hdl:1807/2782. JSTOR 3570877.
- Till, J.E., McCulloch, E.A. (1961) A direct measurement of the radiation sensitivity of normal mouse bone marrow cells. Radiation Research 14:213-22. [Link to article]
- Becker, A.J., McCulloch, E.A., Till, J.E. (1963) Cytological demonstration of the clonal nature of spleen colonies derived from transplanted mouse marrow cells. Nature 197:452-4. [Link to article]
- Siminovitch, L., McCulloch, E.A., Till, J.E. (1963) The distribution of colony-forming cells among spleen colonies. Journal of Cellular and Comparative Physiology 62:327-36. [Link to article]
- Till, J.E., McCulloch, E.A., Siminovitch, L. (1964) A stochastic model of stem cell proliferation, based on the growth of spleen colony-forming cells. Proceedings of the National Academy of Sciences (USA) 51(1):29–36. [Link to article]
- McCulloch, E.A., Siminovitch, L., Till, J.E. (1964) Spleen-colony formation in anaemic mice of genotype WWv. Science 144(1620):844–846. [Link to article]
- McCulloch, E.A., Siminovitch, L., Till, J.E., Russell, E.S., Bernstein, S.E. (1965) The cellular basis of the genetically determined hemopoietic defect in anaemic mice of genotype Sl/Sld. Blood 26(4):399–410. [Link to article]
- Wu, A.M., Till, J.E., Siminovitch, L., McCulloch, E.A. (1968) Cytological evidence for a relationship between normal hematopoietic colony-forming cells and cells of the lymphoid system. J Exp Med 127(3):455–464. [Link to article]
- Worton, R.G., McCulloch, E.A., Till, J.E. (1969) Physical separation of hemopoietic stem cells differing in their capacity for self-renewal. J Exp Med 130(1):91–103. [Link to article]
- McCulloch, E.A. (2003) Stem cells and diversity. Leukemia 17:1042–48.
- McCulloch, E.A. (2003) Normal, and leukaemic hematopoietic stem cells and lineages. In: Stem Cells Handbook, Ed. Stewart Sell, Humana Press, Totowa N.J., pp. 119–31.
