= Global HIV Vaccine Enterprise =

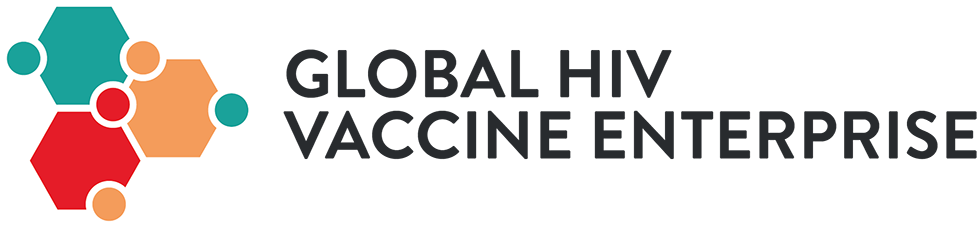

The Global HIV Vaccine Enterprise (the Enterprise) is an alliance of organizations formed to accelerate the search for an HIV vaccine. Initially proposed in Science magazine in 2003 and developed by scientists, health experts and policy makers, the concept of the Enterprise received support from the G8 the following year. The primary aim of the organization is to provide leadership in efforts to reverse the AIDS epidemic. The organization, based in New York City, was founded by representatives from The Gates Foundation, NIH, WHO-UNAIDS, European Commission, Wellcome Trust, International AIDS Vaccine Initiative, French National Agency for Research on AIDS and Viral Hepatitis.

== History ==
In June 2003, a group of 24 individuals in the field of HIV vaccines published a Policy Forum article in the journal Science proposing the creation of the Global HIV Vaccine Enterprise. The article asserted that current attempts to develop such a vaccine were insufficient and that a renewed HIV vaccine research effort was required. The G8 pledged support in July 2004 and the following year, the Enterprise published the Scientific Strategic Plan in the journal PLoS Medicine. The activities of the organization are managed by a Secretariat, overseen by a Board of Directors and advised by the Enterprise Council and a Science Committee.

== Scientific Strategic Plan ==
Following the foundation of the Enterprise, the organization published its Scientific Strategic Plan for accelerating HIV vaccine research in the February 2005 issue of Public Library of Science (PLoS) — Medicine. The plan described the major challenges facing the field and made recommendations in six priority areas. The primary aims of the 2005 Plan were to propose new activities in the field, increase collaboration and acquire funding commitments from government and non-government organizations. In September 2010, the Enterprise published the 2010 Scientific Strategic Plan in Nature Medicine. The organization's current Plan aims to assess the impact of the 2005 Plan and further advancements in the field. The development of the 2010 Plan is driven by five Working Groups made up of more than 100 researchers representing different scientific approaches.

== Activities ==
Consistent with its mission to foster collaboration in the field, the Enterprise participates in and hosts conferences throughout the year including the International AIDS Conference in Vienna and the AIDS Vaccine 2010 Conference in Atlanta, Georgia.

In collaboration with the National Press Foundation and the International AIDS Society, the Enterprise organized a training program for science journalists to report on the conferences.

The Young and Early Career Investigators (YECIs) initiative was formed by the Enterprise to recruit new scientists in the field. The group is chaired by representatives from Harvard Medical School and University of KwaZulu Natal
