= James Till =

Canadian biophysicist (1931–2025)

James Till OC OOnt FRS FRSC
- Born: August 25, 1931; Lloydminster, Alberta, Canada
- Died: May 18, 2025 (aged 93); Toronto, Ontario, Canada
- Education: University of Saskatchewan; Yale University
- Known for: Stem cells
- Awards: Albert Lasker Award for Basic Medical Research; Canada Gairdner International Award
- Scientific career
- Fields: Biophysics
- Workplaces: Ontario Cancer Institute; University of Toronto Faculty of Medicine

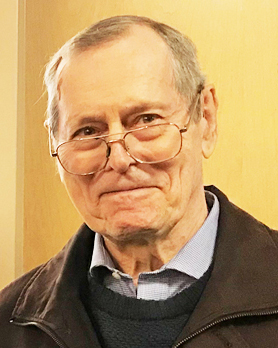
Prof. James Till, 2018

James Edgar Till OC OOnt FRS FRSC (August 25, 1931 – May 18, 2025) was a Canadian biophysicist at the University of Toronto, best known for demonstrating – in a partnership with Ernest McCulloch – the existence of stem cells.

== Early life and work ==
Till was born on August 25, 1931, in Lloydminster, which is located on the border between Saskatchewan and Alberta. The family farm was located north of Lloydminster, in Alberta; the eastern margin of the farm was the Alberta–Saskatchewan boundary.

He attended the University of Saskatchewan with scholarships awarded by the Standard Oil Company and the National Research Council, graduating with a B.Sc. in 1952 and a M.Sc. in physics in 1954. Some of his early work was conducted with Harold E. Johns, a pioneer in cobalt-60 radiotherapy. Till proceeded to Yale University, where he received a Ph.D. in biophysics in 1957. He then became a post-doctoral fellow at the University of Toronto.

== Stem cells ==
Harold E. Johns recruited Till to the Ontario Cancer Institute at Princess Margaret Hospital shortly after he completed his work at Yale. Subsequently, Till chose to work with Ernest McCulloch at the University of Toronto in its Faculty of Medicine. Thus, the older physician's insight was combined with the younger physicist's rigorous and thorough nature.

In the early 1960s, McCulloch and Till started a series of experiments that involved injecting bone marrow cells into irradiated mice. They observed that small raised lumps grew on the spleens of the mice, in proportion to the number of bone marrow cells injected. Till and McCulloch dubbed the lumps 'spleen colonies', and speculated that each lump arose from a single marrow cell: perhaps a stem cell.

In later work, Till & McCulloch were joined by graduate student Andy Becker. They cemented their stem cell theory and in 1963 published their results in Nature. In the same year, in collaboration with Lou Siminovitch, a trailblazer for molecular biology in Canada, they obtained evidence that these same marrow cells were capable of self-renewal, a crucial aspect of the functional definition of stem cells that they had formulated.

In 1969, Till became a Fellow of the Royal Society of Canada.

== Later career and death ==
In the 1980s Till's focus shifted, moving gradually into evaluation of cancer therapies, quality of life issues, and Internet research, including Internet research ethics and the ethics of List mining.

Till held the distinguished title of University Professor Emeritus at the University of Toronto.

Later in life, Till was a vocal proponent of open access to scientific publications.

Until 2019, Till was an editorial member of the open access journal Journal of Medical Internet Research.

Till was a founding member of the Board of Directors of the Canadian Stem Cell Foundation (no longer active).

Till died on May 18, 2025, at the age of 93.

== Honours ==
- 1969, he and Ernest A. McCulloch were awarded the Canada Gairdner International Award
- 1993, awarded Robert L. Noble Prize by the National Cancer Institute of Canada, now the research arm of the Canadian Cancer Society
- 1994, made an Officer of the Order of Canada
- 2000, made a Fellow of the Royal Society of London
- 2004, inducted into the Canadian Medical Hall of Fame
- 2005, he and Ernest A. McCulloch were awarded the Albert Lasker Award for Basic Medical Research
- 2006, made a member of Order of Ontario
- 2018, awarded Edogawa-NICHE Prize

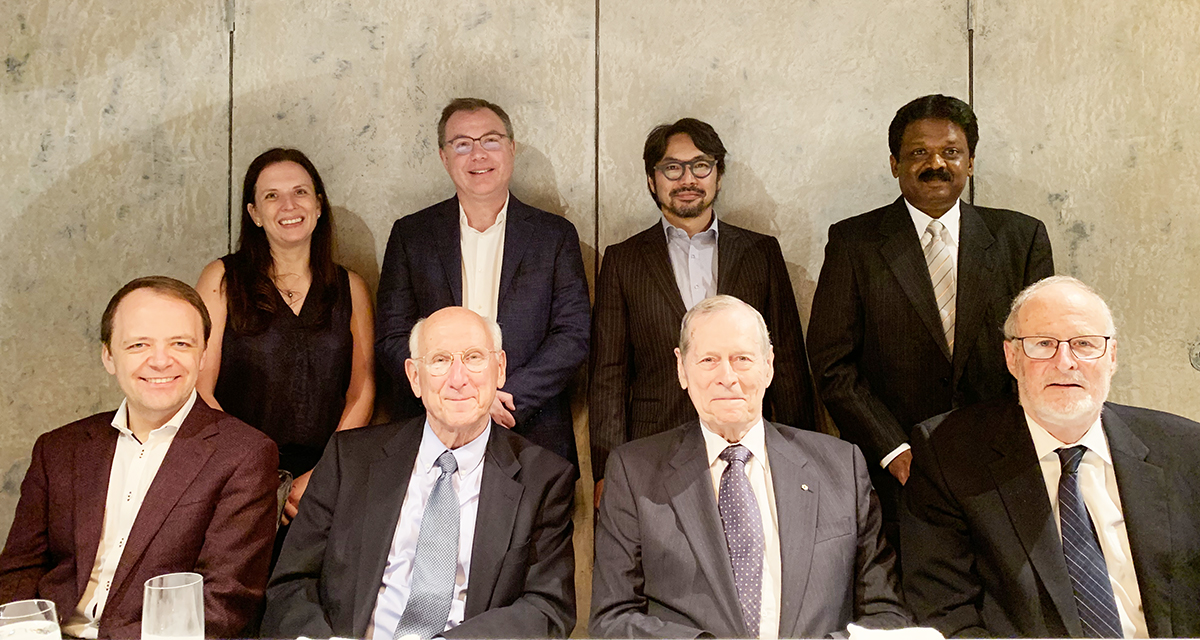
James Till with Steven Rosenberg in Edogawa Niche Prize Dinner, Toronto, 2019

== References and selected publications ==
- McCulloch, E.A.; Till, J.E. (1960). "The radiation sensitivity of normal mouse bone marrow cells, determined by quantitative marrow transplantation into irradiated mice". Radiation Research. 13 (1): 115–125. Bibcode:1960RadR...13..115M. doi:10.2307/3570877. hdl:1807/2782. JSTOR 3570877.
- Till, J.E.; McCulloch, E.A. (1961). "A direct measurement of the radiation sensitivity of normal mouse bone marrow cells". Radiation Research. 14 (2): 213–22. Bibcode:1961RadR...14..213T. doi:10.2307/3570892. hdl:1807/2781. JSTOR 3570892. PMID 13776896.
- Becker, A.J.; McCulloch, E.A.; Till, J.E. (1963). "Cytological demonstration of the clonal nature of spleen colonies derived from transplanted mouse marrow cells". Nature. 197 (4866): 452–4. Bibcode:1963Natur.197..452B. doi:10.1038/197452a0. hdl:1807/2779. PMID 13970094. S2CID 11106827.
- Siminovitch, L.; McCulloch, E.A.; Till, J.E. (1963). "The distribution of colony-forming cells among spleen colonies". Journal of Cellular and Comparative Physiology. 62 (3): 327–36. doi:10.1002/jcp.1030620313. hdl:1807/2778. PMID 14086156.
- Till, J.E.; McCulloch, E.A.; Siminovitch, L. (1964). "A stochastic model of stem cell proliferation, based on the growth of spleen colony-forming cells". Proceedings of the National Academy of Sciences of the United States of America. 51 (1): 29–36. Bibcode:1964PNAS...51...29T. doi:10.1073/pnas.51.1.29. PMC 300599. PMID 14104600.
- McCulloch, E.A.; Siminovitch, L.; Till, J.E. (1964). "Spleen-colony formation in anemic mice of genotype WWv". Science. 144 (3620): 844–846. Bibcode:1964Sci...144..844M. doi:10.1126/science.144.3620.844. hdl:1807/2774. PMID 14149394. S2CID 43571015.
- McCulloch, E.A.; Siminovitch, L.; Till, J.E.; Russell, E.S.; Bernstein, S.E. (1965). "The cellular basis of the genetically determined hemopoietic defect in anemic mice of genotype Sl/Sld". Blood. 26 (4): 399–410. doi:10.1182/blood.V26.4.399.399. hdl:1807/3011. PMID 5317869.
- Wu, A.M.; Till, J.E.; Siminovitch, L.; McCulloch, E.A. (1968). "Cytological Evidence for a Relationship Between Normal Hematopoietic Colony-Forming Cells and Cells of the Lymphoid System". J Exp Med. 127 (3): 455–464. doi:10.1084/jem.127.3.455. PMC 2138458. PMID 5636553.
- Worton, R.G.; McCulloch, E.A.; Till, J.E. (1969). "Physical Separation of Hemopoietic Stem Cells Differing in Their Capacity for Self-Renewal". J Exp Med. 130 (1): 91–103. doi:10.1084/jem.130.1.91. PMC 2138673. PMID 4894546.
- Sutherland, H.J.; Llewellyn-Thomas, H.; Boyd, N.F.; Till, J.E. (1982). "Attitudes toward quality of survival. The concept of "maximal endurable time"". Medical Decision Making. 2 (3): 299–309. doi:10.1177/0272989X8200200306. PMID 7169936. S2CID 25985187.
- Mayer, M.; Till, J.E. (1996). "The Internet: a modern Pandora's box?". Quality of Life Research. 5 (6): 568–71. doi:10.1007/BF00439230. PMID 8993102. S2CID 31584186.
- Till, J.E. (2001). "Predecessors of preprint servers". Learned Publishing. 14 (1): 7–13. arXiv:physics/0102004. Bibcode:2001physics...2004T. doi:10.1087/09531510125100214. S2CID 26820757.
- Till, J.E. (2003). "Success factors for open access". Journal of Medical Internet Research. 5 (1): e1. doi:10.2196/jmir.5.1.e1. PMC 1550547. PMID 12746206.
- Eysenbach, Gunther; Till, James (2001). "Ethical issues in qualitative research on internet communities". BMJ. 323 (7321): 1103–1105. doi:10.1136/bmj.323.7321.1103. PMC 59687. PMID 11701577.
