= Ontario Cancer Institute =

- University Health Network

Geography
- Location: 610 University Avenue, Ontario, Canada
- Coordinates: 43.658322°N 79.390785°W

Organization
- Type: Specialist
- Affiliated university: University of Toronto

Services
- Speciality: Oncology

Links
- Website: www.uhn.ca/PrincessMargaret
- Lists: Hospitals in Canada

The Ontario Cancer Institute (OCI) is the research division of Princess Margaret Cancer Centre, part of the University of Toronto-affiliated University Health Network. As Canada's first dedicated cancer hospital, it opened officially and began to receive patients in 1958, although its research divisions had begun work a year earlier. Because, at that time, a stigma was associated with the word "cancer", the hospital was soon renamed the Princess Margaret Hospital, although the whole operation was called the Ontario Cancer Institute incorporating the Princess Margaret Hospital, or OCI/PMH. Clinicians usually preferred the hospital name, while the scientists used OCI.

The original location of the OCI/PMH was at 500 Sherbourne Street in Toronto. In 1995, the whole operation moved to a new building at 610 University Avenue, and the new Princess Margaret Hospital became part of the University Health Network. The OCI continued as the research arm of the PMH, that in 2012 changed its name in Princess Margaret Cancer Centre.

== See also ==
- Princess Margaret Cancer Centre
- University of Toronto
- Ernest McCulloch
- James Till
