= Canadian Cancer Society =

Canadian charity

Canadian Cancer Society Société canadienne du cancer (French)
- Abbreviation: CCS / SCC
- Founded: 1938
- Type: Non-profit organizations based in Canada
- Legal status: Active
- Purpose: Cancer prevention, information, support, advocacy and research
- Headquarters: Toronto, Ontario, Canada
- Region served: Canada
- Official language: English, French
- Staff: 600-650
- Volunteers: 50,000
- Website: http://www.cancer.ca/

The Canadian Cancer Society (French: Société canadienne du cancer) is Canada's largest national cancer charity and the largest national charitable funder of cancer research in Canada.

== History ==
The Saskatchewan Medical Association formed Canada's first cancer committee in 1929, which established the first provincial Crown-funded, comprehensive cancer control program in the country. As this concept spread to other provinces, the CMA backed the original committee's proposal to establish a national organization called the Canadian Society for the Control of Cancer. The push was slow until, in 1935, the then-Governor General of Canada, the Earl of Bessborough, used his position to give it more momentum and created the King George V Silver Jubilee Cancer Fund for Canada to provide financial support.

The National Study Committee recommended in 1937 the formation of a new organization, which was later called the Canadian Cancer Society for the Control of Cancer, which was created by letters patent, as the Canadian Cancer Society, on 28 March of the following year. Its aim was to educate Canadians about the early warning signs of cancer. At that time, many people did not seek medical help until their cancer had advanced past a treatable stage.

In 1947, CCS began funding cancer research by creating the National Cancer Institute of Canada (NCIC), an agreement between the Canadian Cancer Society and the Federal Department of Health and Welfare. The Society continues to fund cancer research today.

In February 2017, the Canadian Cancer Society announced that it would merge with the Canadian Breast Cancer Foundation, in an effort to reduce redundancies and operating costs. The merged operation continue to operate as the Canadian Cancer Society. Three years later, CCS amalgamated with Prostate Cancer Canada.

== Organization ==
The Canadian Cancer Society consists of:

- 18 offices across Canada
- approximately 50,000 volunteers (including canvassers)
- approximately 600-650 full-time staff

Public accountability for the organization rests at the national level. The national Board of Directors has 21 volunteer representatives from across Canada. The CEO of the Canadian Cancer Society is Andrea Seale.

== Fundraising ==
=== The Daffodil Campaign ===
The logo for the Canadian Cancer Society is the daffodil. The flower had served as a symbol of cancer awareness since the 1950s, when volunteers for CCS organized a fundraising tea in Toronto; the volunteers used daffodils to decorate the tables, as they thought it would create hope that cancer could be beaten.

=== Relay For Life ===
Relay For Life is one of Canadian Cancer Society's signature fundraising event. Relay For Life is a non-competitive, outdoor, overnight relay held in hundreds of communities across Canada every year. The 12-hour relay brings teams of 10 people together to take turns walking, running or wheeling around a track from 7 p.m. to 7 a.m. Main events include a Survivors' Victory Lap, a luminary ceremony to remember loved ones lost to cancer as well as anything from karaoke to bingo to help keep people energized throughout the night. In 2009, the event raised more than $52 million for CCS at 474 events across Canada.

=== Thing-a-ma-boob ===
Introduced in 2005, the Thing-a-ma-boob is an educational keyring made of four different sized beads, each indicating the various sized lumps that can be detected through regular breast self-exams, physical exams by a healthcare professional, first mammogram, to regular mammograms.

Money raised from the sale of the Thing-a-ma-boob will go towards funding breast cancer research, providing support services for victims and their families, as well as prevention and advocacy initiatives.

== Activities ==
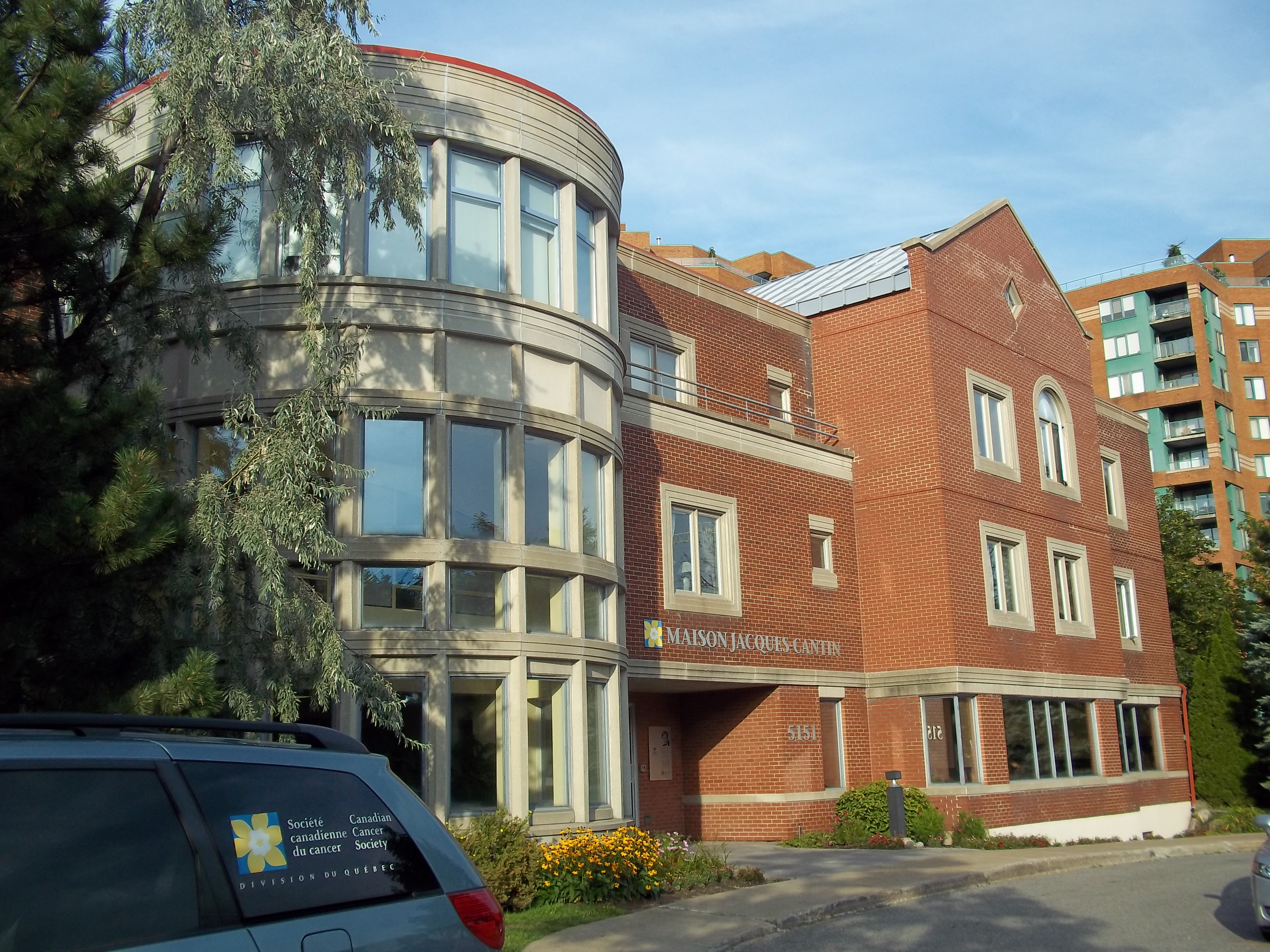
The Jacques-Cantin Lodge, Montreal

The Canadian Cancer Society offers a variety of information and support services to Canadians including:

- A bilingual, toll-free Cancer Information Service (1 888 939-3333)
- CancerConnection.ca – a peer-support program that connects people with similar cancer experiences
- Child, youth and family supports – year-round recreation programs and summer camps for children and young adults with cancer and their families
- Accommodation and transportation services in some areas
- Free wigs for cancer patients and trained professionals to help with fitting
- Smokers' Helpline is a national tobacco cessation service
- Community Services Locator – a searchable database of over 4,000 cancer-related services and resources nationwide.

Big Tobacco Lies is a campaign run by the Tobacco Industry Action Committee to provide outreach and information on tobacco use. The group lobbied for Bill 45, the Making Healthier Choices act, which was passed in May 2015.

== Research ==
The Canadian Cancer Society is the largest national charitable funder of cancer research. Cancer research is funded through the Canadian Cancer Society Research Institute. Using a peer review process, research grants and training opportunities are funded for all types of cancer and include basic laboratory research, clinical trials as well as behavioral, psychosocial and population-based cancer research.

The survival rate for Canadians with cancer to survive at least five years jumped from 25% in the 1940s to over 60% as of 2020. In 2020-2021, the Canadian Cancer Society invested $46.8M in life-changing research with 200 lead researchers supported.

The Canadian Cancer Society created the Research Information Outreach Teams (RIOT) in Kingston, London, Toronto, Ottawa, and Montreal with university students and young scientists focused on community outreach.

Notable research that the Canadian Cancer Society has funded includes:

- the development of the cobalt-60 unit in the 1950s to treat cancer tumors with cobalt therapy, a treatment still widely used today
- the discovery of vinblastine as successful chemotherapy for Hodgkin lymphoma in the 1950s, also a treatment for cancer still used today

The Canadian Cancer Society also advocates on behalf of Canadians by encouraging governments to pass public policies that will help prevent cancer and help people who have cancer. Issues the Society advocates for include tobacco control, ornamental use of pesticides, health systems reform, occupational carcinogen exposure, cancer screening and gene patenting.

The Canadian Cancer Society gives out four research awards in the advancement in the field of cancer research. The Robert L. Noble Prize is given for achievements in basic biomedical cancer research. The O. Harold Warwick Prize is given to researchers who made accomplishments in cancer control research.

== See also ==
- American Cancer Society Cancer Action Network
- American Cancer Society Center
- caBIG, the Cancer BioInformatics Grid, a National Cancer Institute (US) initiative to link cancer researchers and their data
- Cancer Information Service (CIS)
- European Organisation for Research and Treatment of Cancer (EORTC)
- Journal of the National Cancer Institute
- List of Canadian organizations with royal patronage
- National Comprehensive Cancer Network
- NCI-designated Cancer Center
- Programme of Action for Cancer Therapy A close partner in dealing with cancer care in developing world
- Thyroid Cancer Canada
