= Hannah Grier Coome =

Canadian religious sister

- Born: 28 October 1837; Carrying Place, Upper Canada
- Died: 9 February 1921; Toronto, Ontario
- Venerated in: Anglican Church of Canada
- Feast: 9 February

Sarah Hannah Roberta Grier Coome (October 28, 1837 – February 9, 1921) was a Canadian Anglican religious sister who founded the Sisterhood of St. John the Divine and was its first mother superior.

== Early and family life ==
Sarah Hannah Roberta Grier was born in the Carrying Place, Upper Canada, to the Rev. John Grier, a high church Anglican priest who had emigrated from Ireland in 1823 and been ordained in Quebec, and his wife Eliza Lilias Geddes. Hannah (as she preferred to be known by) was their third daughter and sixth child. Her parents took responsibility for her education at home, which also for a time was in Belleville. One sister, Rose Jane Elizabeth Grier, became a teacher, and ultimately principal of the Bishop Strachan School in Toronto. On July 23, 1859, Hannah married civil engineer Charles Horace Coome, who worked on the Grand Trunk Railway, and the couple initially lived in Kingston.

In 1862, Charles Coome accepted an engineering job in Britain, and the couple moved across the Atlantic. While in Britain, Hannah became acquainted with the Oxford Movement as well as the Community of St Mary the Virgin in Wantage and felt drawn to mission work. She also became pregnant but lost what would be her only child after a severe fall which also required a long convalescence.

The couple returned to North America in 1876, but a year later, Charles Coome died in Chicago. Hannah continued to live in the American city with a nephew and a brother for several years, and supported herself by teaching decorative art, as well as by embroidering hangings and other decorations for churches.

Nonetheless, by 1881, Coome considered entering a religious community, especially returning to Wantage, England, to join the Community of St. Mary the Virgin. Instead, at a party arranged by her sister Rose as she went to Toronto in 1881, Coome met the Reverend Ogden Pulteney Ford (high churchman and priest at three parishes in Toronto) and Georgina Broughall (wife of the rector of St. Stephen in the Fields Church), who told her about their plans to form a similar sisterhood there in Toronto. The Canadian group also held an organizational meeting and others in the winter.

== Sisterhood of St. John the Divine ==
In June 1882, Coome and Amelia Elizabeth (Aimée) Hare travelled to Peekskill, New York, for two years' formation at the Sisters of St Mary, a relatively new Anglican educational and nursing order led by Harriet Starr Cannon, while the Canadian group did further fundraising and organization, including within the Family Compact for which Rose and Coome may have qualified. Hannah Coome and Aimee Hare trained with the American sisters in their hospital and social missions in New York City. Upon completing their novitiate, Coome professed religious vows on September 8, 1884, at the Peekskill motherhouse, and she and Hare returned to Toronto.

In Toronto, the new sisters continued to find support from Ford, who became Coome's spiritual director. At first, Coome (now known as "Sister Hannah") and Novice Aimee stayed with Rose Coome at the Bishop Strachan School, but their supporters soon managed to purchase a house near Ford's church of St. Matthias, Bellwoods. They called themselves the Sisterhood of St. John the Divine after the London parish of St. John the Divine, Kennington, where Coome had found spiritual support years earlier. Moreover, an English sister from an order with a similar name (Sr. Anna Lomas, of the Community of the Nursing Sisters of St. John the Divine) had gone to Canada circa 1878, but failed to form a community. In any event, Bishop Arthur Sweatman recognized the new order in a ceremony on St. John's Day, 1884.

Early in their ministry, Coome, Aimee and various postulants experienced taunts from Protestants who considered their uniform, similar to widow's garb at the time, excessively "papist" (Roman Catholic). Some Orangemen even threatened to burn down their house but were ultimately converted.

However, they had barely established themselves when Bishop Sweatman and later the Provincial Synod requested their support in Saskatchewan, as a result of the North-West Rebellion. Thus in May, 1885, Mother Hannah, Novice Aimee, two postulants and three nursing graduates embarked by train and boat for Moose Jaw, where they established a hospital to nurse wounded or otherwise ill soldiers. Their mission succeeded, so that on their return to Toronto in July, not only had Mother Hannah received a medal from the Government of Canada, opposition to their mission lessened. Mother Hannah adopted a Rule derived from that of the Peekskill community (itself modeled on the Rule of St. Benedict), which provided for prayer as well as good works.

In 1886 the new order accepted responsibility for a house on Larch Street from the parish of St. George the Martyr, designed to care for the elderly, although at the time no sisters other than Mother Hannah had taken full religious vows. On June 1, 1888, the new order laid the cornerstone for the city's first surgical hospital for women, St. John's, but Rev. Ford did not live to see the project completed, succumbing to cancer.

Nonetheless, the community continued. Rev. Alexander Bethune (headmaster of Trinity College School, Coome's longtime friend and son of former bishop Alexander Bethune) agreed to be their warden. The hospital was dedicated on May 2, 1889, and by year's end the newly incorporated community adopted its bylaws and other organizational documents, as well as moved to larger quarters on Major Street where the motherhouse would remain for sixty years. The needs of their elderly patients outgrew the house on Larch Street, so the order accepted another on John Street, which in turn eventually proved too small. In 1906, the sisterhood built the Church Home for the Aged at Bellevue and Oxford Streets in the Kensington neighborhood, and added another wing the following year.

In 1892 the sisterhood accepted its first long-term foundation outside Toronto, taking over Bishop Bethune College, a boarding school in Oshawa. Increasingly over time, the community not only trained nurses and ministered to the elderly, but also ran schools and orphanages, serving the handicapped and poor in both large cities and rural areas. It grew to over 500 associates by 1930.

== Death and legacy ==
Coome experienced sciatica, overwork, and continued complications of her miscarriage for many years, but only retired at age 79. The sisters elected her niece, Dora Grier, to succeed her as mother superior. Coome was heartbroken by her sister Rose's death in October 1920, and died herself, surrounded by her sisterhood, on Ash Wednesday, February 9, 1921. After a funeral at St. Thomas' Church in Toronto where the community usually worshipped, she was buried at St. James Cemetery affiliated with the cathedral in Toronto. She rests beside fourteen sisters and novices of the order who knew her, and one infant who died the previous year.

The order she founded at various times had houses in Ontario, Quebec (mission work at the Church of St. John the Evangelist in Montreal), Nova Scotia, Saskatchewan (Qu'Appelle Diocesan School in Regina), and Alberta (St. John's House for unmarried mothers), as well as continued to maintain relations with similar orders in the United States and England. In 1933, it helped establish a rehabilitation hospital in north Toronto, now St. John's Rehab Hospital. Twenty years later they moved their motherhouse to Willowdale, Toronto near that hospital. Their ministry also offers religious retreats, with current active houses in Toronto, as well as Victoria, British Columbia.
