= Toronto General Hospital (disambiguation) =

The Toronto General Hospital is a major teaching hospital in Downtown Toronto. Other hospitals in Toronto currently or formerly named "general hospital" include:

- Etobicoke General Hospital
- Michael Garron Hospital, formerly Toronto East General Hospital
- North York General Hospital
- Queensway Health Centre, formerly Queensway General Hospital
- Scarborough General Hospital (Toronto)

== See also ==
- List of hospitals in Toronto
