= Rouge Valley Health System =

Geography
- Location: Ontario, Canada

Organization
- Care system: Medicare
- Type: Community

Services
- Emergency department: Yes

History
- Opened: 1998
- Closed: 2016

Links
- Website: www.rougevalley.ca

Rouge Valley Health System (RVHS) was a hospital network in the province of Ontario, Canada. It was created in 1998 through the merger of Centenary Health Centre in Toronto and the Ajax and Pickering General Hospital in Ajax, serving the communities of Scarborough, Pickering, Ajax and Whitby. It was part of the Central-East Local Health Integration Network as mandated by the Ontario Ministry of Health and Long-Term Care. The two hospitals were known as the Rouge Valley Centenary and Rouge Valley Ajax and Pickering, respectively.

In 2016, Rouge Valley Health Network was defunct after Rouge Valley Centenary partnered with The Scarborough Hospital to form the Scarborough Health Network while Rouge Valley Ajax and Pickering joined Lakeridge Health.

== See also ==
- List of hospitals in Toronto
