= Irene Stickland =

Canadian hospital administrator

Lieutenant Colonel Irene Stickland
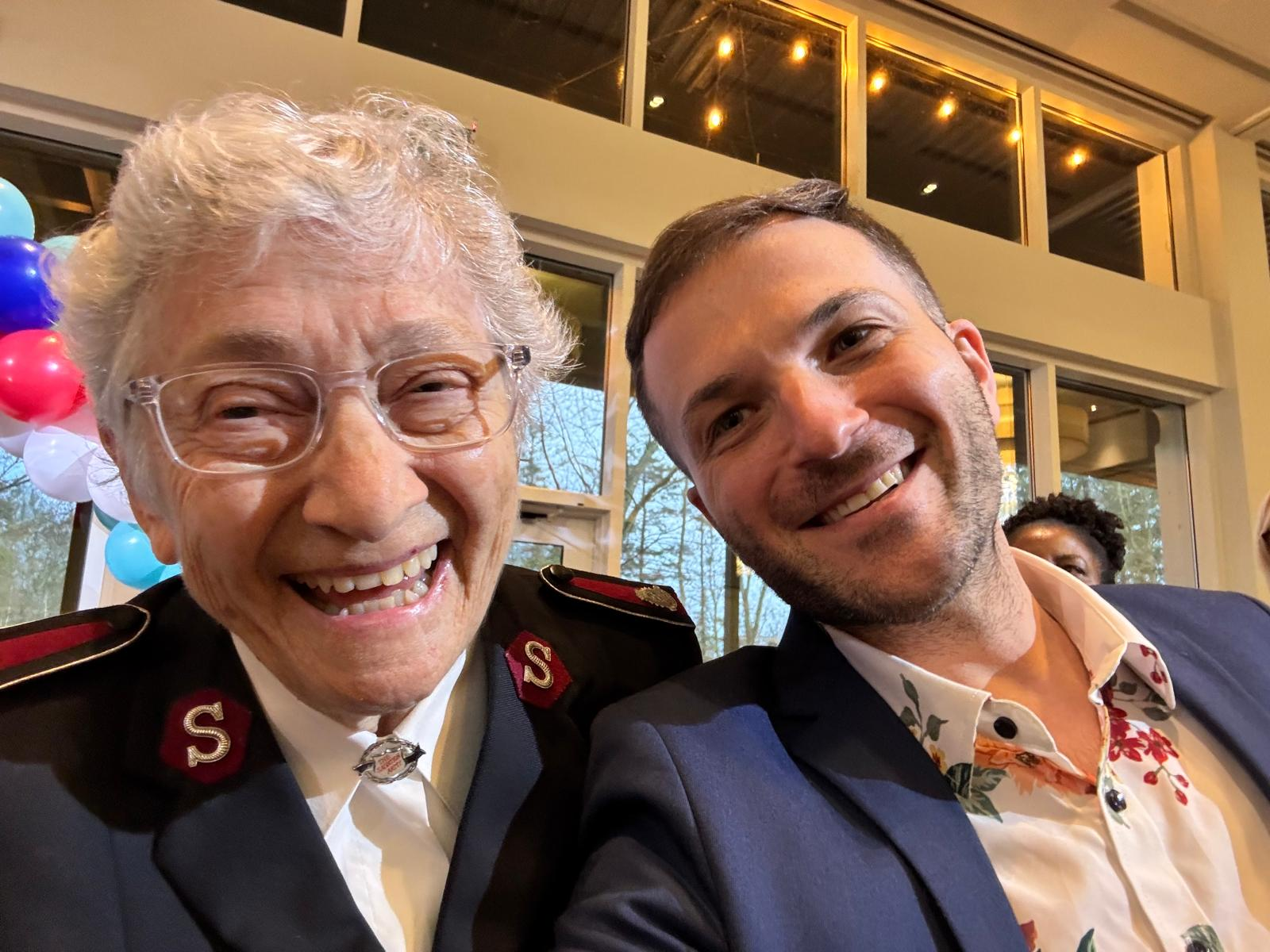
- Occupations: Hospital administrator, Salvation Army officer
- Employer(s): Salvation Army (Scarborough Grace Hospital), Scarborough Health Network
- Known for: CEO of Scarborough Grace Hospital (1989–1999); Deputy CEO of The Scarborough Hospital (1999–2003)

Irene Stickland is a Canadian hospital administrator and Salvation Army officer. She is best known for her leadership of the Salvation Army Scarborough Grace Hospital in Scarborough, Ontario, and later the Scarborough Health Network (Birchmount site), then known as Scarborough Grace Hospital. Stickland served as president and chief executive officer (CEO) of Scarborough Grace Hospital from 1989 until 1999, and subsequently as deputy CEO and executive vice president of The Scarborough Hospital (now part of Scarborough Health Network) until her retirement in 2003. A Salvation Army Lieutenant-Colonel, Stickland was instrumental in the hospital’s development and guided it through the 2003 SARS outbreak in Toronto. In honour of her service, the education and conference centre at Scarborough’s Birchmount Hospital has been named the "Irene Stickland Education Centre."

== Early life and education ==
Stickland graduated from the Salvation Army Grace Hospital School of Nursing in Windsor, Ontario, in 1960. She later became a commissioned officer in the Salvation Army, which uses military-style ranks for its personnel. Her rank of Lieutenant-Colonel reflects her senior status in the organization.

== Career ==
=== Scarborough Grace Hospital ===
In 1989, Stickland was appointed president and CEO of Scarborough Grace Hospital. Under her leadership, the hospital achieved four-year accreditation awards and introduced new community care programs. During the Ontario hospital restructuring of the 1990s, she advocated for faith-based healthcare within the provincial system.

=== Scarborough Health Network and SARS ===
Following the 1999 merger of Scarborough Grace and Scarborough General hospitals, Stickland became deputy CEO and executive vice president of the newly formed The Scarborough Hospital. The Birchmount campus, formerly Grace Hospital, was one of the first institutions to encounter SARS cases in Canada during the 2003 outbreak. Stickland was directly involved in the emergency response and later presented on the lessons learned.

== Later life and community work ==
Since her retirement in 2003, Stickland has continued community service through the Salvation Army. In 2024, she volunteered with a Salvation Army food bank garden project in Scarborough. She is listed among donors to the Scarborough Health Network Foundation.

The main conference and education space at SHN’s Birchmount Hospital is named the Irene Stickland Education Centre in her honour.
