= Lakeridge Health Bowmanville =

- Lakeridge Health Corporation
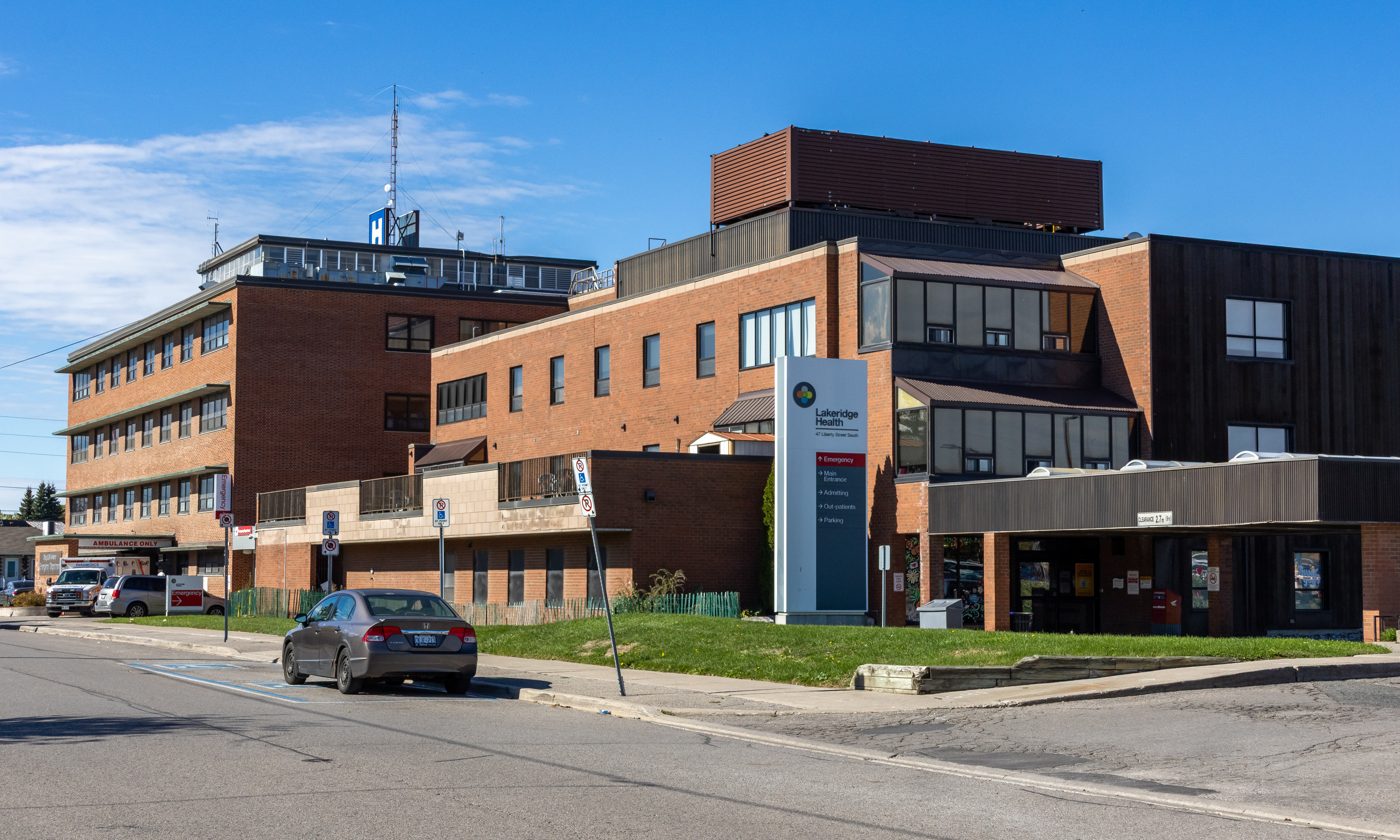
- The Bowmanville Hospital in 2025

- Location in Ontario

Geography
- Location: Clarington, Ontario, Canada
- Coordinates: 43.908056°N 78.680556°W

Services
- Emergency department: Yes

Lakeridge Health Bowmanville is a fully accredited hospital in Clarington, Ontario, Canada, servicing the municipality of Clarington. It is run by Lakeridge Health Corporation, part of the Central East Local Health Integration Network.

The hospital was founded as Memorial Hospital Bowmanville in 1913.

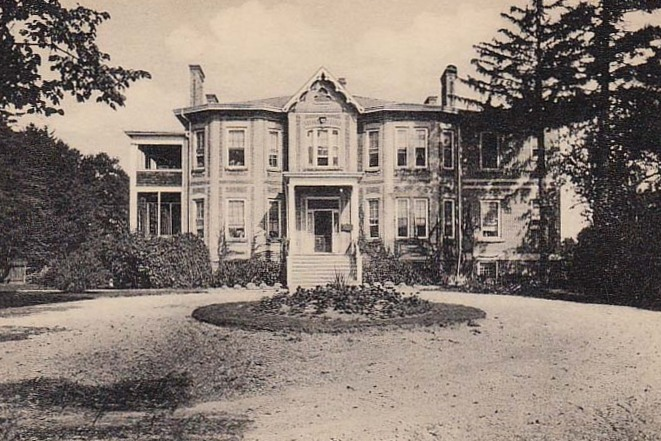
The original Bowmanville General Hospital, c. 1910s

In 1998 the hospital, along with North Durham Health Services (Community Memorial Hospital Port Perry and Uxbridge Cottage Hospital), Oshawa General Hospital and Whitby General Hospital, were placed under the administration of the Lakeridge Health Corporation. Memorial Hospital was subsequently renamed, and Uxbridge Cottage Hospital has left the partnership and is now a site of the Markham Stouffville Hospital.

== History (Memorial Hospital Bowmanville) ==
The former private residence, constructed in the 1850s only steps from the present hospital, was purchased in 1912 by J.W. Alexander, President of the Dominion Organ and Piano Company, who donated it for use as a hospital. This building was demolished and a new building on the same site was formally opened on July 31, 1951.

Over the years, more renovations and additions were needed to house the extensive programs and services offered. On June 11, 2009, the Lakeridge Health Board of Trustees approved several new projects at Lakeridge Health Bowmanville, including mammography, coffee kiosk and gift shop projects. In July 2011, Lakeridge Health announced the opening of a new space for its Critical Care unit. Expansions related to the Emergency Department and day surgery are expected to occur in the near future.

An expansion to the hospital was announced in January 2018.
