= Health in Toronto =

Several factors affect citizens' health in Toronto.

== Description ==
The city is part of the Toronto Public Health Division, and is home to many hospitals.

Another risk to health for citizens is exposure to crime in the city. Toronto has a rate of violent crime of 738 incidents per 100,000 people, though this is still lower than the national average of 951, according to 2006 Statistics Canada data, and far lower than other cities of comparable size (particularly those in the United States).

== Governance ==
Several municipally funded programs affect health in the city. They are listed below, and where possible their annual budgets are provided. Provincial and federal programs also affect health in Toronto, such as the provincial Smoke-Free Ontario Act which bans cigarette smoking in enclosed spaces in the province.

- Toronto Parks, Forestry and Recreation Division ($239,953,000, 2004)
- Toronto Police Services ($707,573,000, 2004)
- Toronto Public Health ($182,672,000, 2004)
- Toronto Water Division

=== History of public administration ===
All municipalities had their own public health programs, meaning a patchwork of systems throughout Ontario, including within the modern borders of Toronto. For example, the Town of Mimico, Town of New Toronto, and Village of Long Branch each had their own program, despite the communities bordering each other within a few kilometre stretch of Lakeshore Road. In 1956, the Lakeshore Board of Education in 1956 asking the councils of to consider forming one central service.

Metropolitan Toronto was created in 1954 as a measure to encourage collaboration between the urban municipalities in southern York County. In 1960, the Toronto Board of Health chair called for a Metro-wide board, stating "epidemics don't recognize municipal boundaries. The present chaotic division of health responsibilities in ridiculous."

Premier John Robarts' government looked to find efficiencies in local governance. That included Health Minister Dr. Matthew Dymond proposing a joint board of health for Metro's six municipalities. Local Medical Officers of Health and board chairs largely balked at the idea, announced in 1967, even though the province offered to pay 75% of costs, instead of the previous 25%. It was thought that a merger would raise costs, that one body couldn't serve 2 million residents, and that a merger might lead to a "lowest common denominator" approach. Dymond remained firm, noting that other large municipalities had been successful in such transitions.

== Organizations ==
Health organizations in Toronto include:

- List of hospitals in Toronto
- Canadian Association of Food Banks
- Centre for Addiction and Mental Health
- The Crohn's and Colitis Foundation of Canada
- Heart and Stroke Foundation
- Canadian Cancer Society
- Alzheimer Society of Canada
- Alzheimer Society of Ontario
- Leukemia & Lymphoma Society of Canada
- Canadian Breast Cancer Foundation
- Canadian Foundation for AIDS Research
- Cystic Fibrosis Canada
- Canadian Mental Health Association
- ALS Society of Canada
- Canadian Organization for Rare Disorders
- The Canadian Hearing Society
- JDRF
- Kidney Foundation of Canada
- Multiple Sclerosis Society of Canada
- Muscular Dystrophy Canada

The city hosted the 2006 XVI International AIDS Conference.

== See also ==
- Determinants of health
