= Harriet Starr Cannon =

American nun

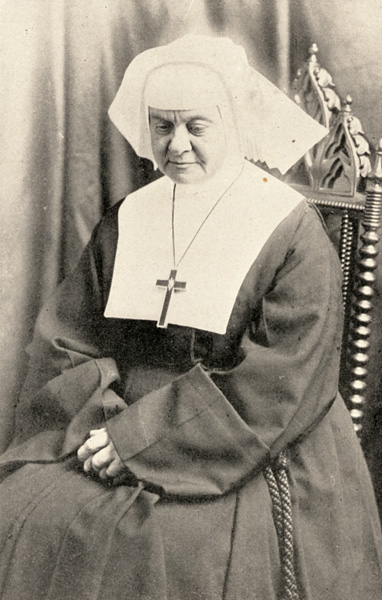
- Mother Harriet Cannon, CSM

Mother
- Born: May 7, 1823; Charleston, South Carolina
- Died: April 5, 1896 (aged 72)
- Venerated in: Episcopal Church (USA)
- Feast: 5 April

Harriet Starr Cannon (May 7, 1823 – April 5, 1896) was a nun who founded the Sisterhood of St. Mary, one of the first orders of Augustinian nuns in the Anglican Communion and which remains dedicated to social service.

== Early life ==
Cannon was born in Charleston, South Carolina to stock broker William and Sally Hinman Cannon. The Cannons were a merchant family whose ancestors were wealthy Huguenots who fled France for New Netherlands about 1632 and lived in New York City by 1693.

On September 29 and 30, 1824 William and Sally Cannon, respectively, died of yellow fever. Seventeen-month-old Catherine Starr and three-year-old Harriet were orphaned. Sally's brother-in-law, Captain James Allen had stopped in the port of Charleston about that time. He rescued the girls, brought them aboard his boat, and took them to their maternal aunt, Mrs. Fowler or Mrs. Hyde in Bridgeport, Connecticut where they were raised. The sisters had an especially close relationship as well as joined their aunt's five children. Harriet was described as cheerful, well-mannered, intelligent, and a proficient artist and musician. She taught music and art to children who were friends or relatives. Harriet lost one eye in a childhood accident when she moved while her hair was being combed.

While in New York visiting relatives, Harriet was confirmed in 1844. A relative, however, described her as a "great society girl, and not at all religious."

Her sister married John Ruggles in 1851 and moved to California. Moreover, the Hyde family moved to Milford, Connecticut. Sometime beforehand, Harriet moved to Brooklyn where she sang in the Grace Church choir and taught music. Harriet planned to move to California, and began to say her good-byes to family members but shortly before embarking in 1855, she learned that Catherine had died. This "became the crisis of her life". She later recalled, "I can look back to one period of my life when I scarcely knew whether the sun rose or the sun set; when for days there seemed to be no one in the world but myself." Forty years later, Cannon still came to tears when she talked about her sister and stated that if Catherine had lived, she would not have become a sister and mother of the church.

== Sisterhood of the Holy Communion ==
On March 6, 1856 Harriet Cannon became a probationer of the Episcopal order of deaconesses, Sisterhood of the Holy Communion, founded about a decade earlier by Anne Ayres. The order was somewhat controversial; detractors criticized their attire and mission for resembling Catholic nuns. For the probationary three-year period, Cannon was expected to support herself financially. She cared for seriously ill patients, including some quarantined or victims of small pox.

The deaconesses assisted the poor in New York City under the auspices of Rev. William Augustus Muhlenberg and the Church of the Holy Communion, and had recently helped found St. Luke's Hospital. Dr. Muhlenberg described the deaconesses as "the centre around whom the others are to rally, carrying out her directions and deriving through her, in return, supplies, protection, and all needful provision for their comfort." During this time, he also described a visit as attending physician:

...he found a young probationary Sister, rocking, as he lay wrapped in a blanket within her arms, a little boy, very ill with the loathsome disease. She was singing a hymn for him, and the poor child smiled as he looked up in her face and forgot his pain and restlessness. Dr. Muhlenberg came down from the ward enamored of the picture—'The very ideal of a Sister of Charity.'

— Sister Mary Hilary, CSM, Ten Decades of Praise

== Community of St. Mary ==
In 1863, conflicts with Ayres led Cannon and four other sisters to leave and establish a new order, initially called the Sisters of St. Catherine. On February 2, 1865, Bishop Horatio Potter (1802-87) formally received Cannon, Jane Haight, Mary Heartt, Amelia Asten, and Sarah Bridge as the "Sisterhood of St. Mary". The new order, now called the Community of St. Mary (CSM), followed a modified Benedictine rule. It concentrated its efforts upon helping women, the homeless and orphans. By year's end it accepted its first novice. During her lifetime and afterwards, the Community developed girls’ schools, hospitals, and orphanages in New York, Tennessee, and Wisconsin.

=== House of Mercy ===
In 1863 the new religious order took over the former Howland Mansion on what was then the rural tip of Manhattan. The mansion had been turned into a home for "abandoned and troubled women" by Mrs. William Richmond, a rector's wife. By 1891, Cannon had overseen the building of a 200-room castle-like brick structure on the still-rural site and renamed it the "House of Mercy". Bishop Henry Codman Potter held an elaborate consecration service. Courts began assigning girls there, and families also brought their wayward daughters. The new structure, built to house 154 "fallen" women, had three divisions: the House of Mercy, St. Agnes’s House, and a division for penitents. Iron gratings barred the windows, and persons assigned to one division were not allowed to mingle with those in other divisions.

It better integrated with the rest of Manhattan when street car lines extended into the area in 1906, significantly after Mother Cannon's death. Controversies also ensued, as discussed infra, and the order transferred many of its services to other facilities, although some functions continued at the location which ultimately became Inwood Park for decades.

=== Peekskill ===
In 1868, Mother Cannon, renowned for her good humor, established a school as well as headquarters for the new community on a site overlooking the Hudson River in Peekskill, New York. Novices, sisters and Mother Cannon (when she was not traveling) lived in a converted farmhouse on the site for decades as the complex was slowly built. Hannah Grier Coome, trained by the order in Peekskill and New York City, took religious vows at the Peekskill motherhouse on a Marian feastday in 1884, and returned to Canada to found a similar order, the Sisterhood of St. John the Divine. In 1892, St. Gabriel's chapel was dedicated in Peekskill, overlooking the Hudson River and built from stone quarried onsite.

=== Memphis, Tennessee ===
In 1871 Mother Cannon sent Sister Constance and several others to Memphis, Tennessee at the invitation of Bishop Charles Quintard to establish a school for girls and an orphanage. The new order was recognized for its good works seven years later, after four sisters (Constance, Thecla, Ruth, and Frances) died while nursing victims of yellow fever outbreak (along with Episcopal priests Rev. Charles Carroll Parsons and Rev. Louis S. Schuyler). The outbreak killed 5,150 Memphians and this depopulation caused the city to lose its charter. On the following All Saints Day, James De Koven and the rector of St. John's Church of Washington, D.C. lauded their efforts, and they are now honored liturgically on September 9 as the Martyrs of Memphis.

=== Death and legacy ===
Three weeks before her death, Mother Cannon traveled to New York City to check on St. Mary's Hospital. Realizing her fondness for the sea, she established her last facility, a summer home for children in Norwalk, Connecticut overlooking the beach. She returned to the Peekskill motherhouse in good spirits, but fell gravely ill shortly after a retreat on Passion Sunday. She died about noon on Easter Day, 1896, surrounded by her community. She was buried in the convent cemetery in Peekskill. Mother Cannon is remembered in the Episcopal Church's Calendar of saints on April 5.

== Community of St. Mary after Cannon's death ==
The Community of St. Mary continued following Mother Cannon's death. In 2008 the Community of St. Mary merged with the American branch of the Sisters of Charity, notwithstanding their slightly different religious rules. The Sisters of Charity using one modeled upon that of St. Vincent de Paul, and the CSM rule having been written by Morgan Dix and founding Cowley Father Richard Meux Benson based on the Rule of St. Benedict.

=== Motherhouse ===
In Peekskill, the order built a new convent in 1905 and a new school building in 1911. In 1977 the order closed the school and sold the land to a private developer. In 2003, the religious community left the Peekskill motherhouse and chapel in Westchester County and moved to rural Greenwich, New York in Washington County. They share a 620-acre Washington County facility with the Spiritual Life Center of the Episcopal Diocese of Albany, offering spiritual retreats as well as raising cashmere goats. Ginsburg Development acquired the remainder of the Peekskill site, which it proposed to develop as "The Abbey at Fort Hill", but after the gutting the buildings, stalled as a result of the 2008 recession.

=== Memphis ===
The Memphis branch closed St. Mary's Preparatory School for Girls after the 1967-68 term, but now operates a retreat center near Sewanee, The University of the South. The CSM's western province continues to offer retreats at Mary's Margin in Mukwonago, Wisconsin. Since 2002, the order has another branch in Malawi as well as a mission at Sagada in the Philippines.

=== St. Mary's Hospital, Bayside ===
St. Mary's Hospital continues in Bayside, New York, now specializing in caring for children with special needs or life-limiting conditions. St. Mary's remains a vibrant hospital, but is no longer affiliated with the Episcopal Church.

=== House of Mercy ===
In August 1896, months after Mother Harriet's death, Laura Forman from Asbury Park, New Jersey brought a lawsuit, charging that while she was visiting her sister in New York, her father kidnapped and wrongfully committed her to this facility, where she was fed bread and molasses and occasionally gagged. Another sensational parental kidnapping case generated headlines in 1902. Still, the 1910 census counted 107 inmates at the House of Mercy, and listed its capacity as 110. Courts continued to sentence prostitutes to the facility, which trained them for domestic service, in part by operating a laundry. By 1912, most of the commitments were of victimized children, many previously abandoned to life on the streets. The Bureau of Social Hygiene reported that only four adult prostitutes were sent to the House of Mercy, but 57 girls had been sentenced to indefinite terms at the facility. However, funding had dried up, and by 1921, the New York Society for the Prevention of Cruelty to Children leased the building while it built a permanent home on Fifth Avenue between 105th and 106th Streets. Children had previously been jailed with adults or at stationhouses pending judicial action. The following year, the average daily population was 152 and the average stay eight days.

The Society moved to Valhalla, New York, and sold the Manhattan property in sections to the City of New York between 1915 and 1926. By 1933 the structures had become decrepit, although a caretaker had moved in (with his family of 10 children). Squatters also moved in: some farming the grounds, others establishing a colony with houseboats on the Hudson River. The city government drove out the squatters and tore down the main building in 1933. The caretaker and his family moved out when his cottage collapsed on December 9, 1933. The property became Inwood Hill Park with the assistance of workers from the Works Progress Administration (WPA) during the Great Depression. By 1950 the park had been extended into the Hudson River.
