= List of hospitals in Toronto =

There are over thirty hospitals located in Toronto, Ontario, Canada. Many of them are also medical research facilities and teaching schools affiliated with the University of Toronto as part of the Toronto Academic Health Science Network (TAHSN). Most hospitals are grouped under administrative networks that serve particular neighbourhoods and communities and share a number of medical services. The largest of the networks is University Health Network (UHN), which governs four of Canada's largest research hospitals located across Downtown Toronto. Some hospitals in Toronto operate independently, attracting large funding and public donation due to historic brand value and overall clinical standards.

== Existing hospitals ==
Name	Founded	District	Network	University affiliate	Former name(s)	Image
Baycrest Health Sciences	1918	North York	Baycrest	University of Toronto (fully-affiliated)	Toronto Jewish Old Folks Home	
Bellwood Health Services	1984	East York	Edgewood Health Network			
Hennick Bridgepoint Hospital	1875	Old Toronto	Sinai Health System	University of Toronto (TAHSN associate members-affiliated)	Riverdale Hospital Bridgepoint Active Healthcare	
Casey House	1988	Old Toronto				
Centre for Addiction and Mental Health, College Street Site	1966	Old Toronto	Centre for Addiction and Mental Health	University of Toronto (fully-affiliated)	Clarke Institute of Psychiatry	
Centre for Addiction and Mental Health, Queen Street Site	1850	Old Toronto	Centre for Addiction and Mental Health	University of Toronto (fully-affiliated)	Provincial Lunatic Asylum; Queen Street Mental Health Centre	
Centre for Addiction and Mental Health, Russell Street Site	1949	Old Toronto	Centre for Addiction and Mental Health	University of Toronto (fully-affiliated)	Addiction Research Foundation	
Centric Health Surgical Centre Toronto	1960	North York	Clearpoint Health Network		Don Mills Surgical Unit	
Etobicoke General Hospital	1972	Etobicoke	William Osler Health System			
Hennick Humber Hospital, Wilson Site	1997	North York	Humber River Health	University of Toronto (Community-Affiliated); Queen's University at Kingston	Humber River Hospital	
Holland Bloorview Kids Rehabilitation Hospital	1899	East York		University of Toronto (fully-affiliated)	Home for Incurable Children; Bloorview MacMillan Children's Centre	
Hospital for Sick Children	1875	Old Toronto	SickKids	University of Toronto (fully-affiliated)	Victoria Hospital for Sick Children	
Michael Garron Hospital	1929	East York	Toronto East Health Network	University of Toronto (TAHSN associate members-affiliated)	Toronto East General Hospital	
Mount Sinai Hospital	1923	Old Toronto	Sinai Health System	University of Toronto (fully-affiliated)	Toronto Hebrew Maternity and Convalescent Hospital	
North York General Hospital	1968	North York	North York General	University of Toronto (TAHSN associate members-affiliated)		
North York General Hospital, Branson Centre	1957	North York	North York General	University of Toronto (TAHSN associate members-affiliated)	North York Branson Hospital	
North York General Hospital, Seniors' Health Centre	1985	North York	North York General	University of Toronto (TAHSN associate members-affiliated)		
Princess Margaret Cancer Centre	1952	Old Toronto	University Health Network	University of Toronto (fully-affiliated)	Ontario Cancer Institute; Princess Margaret Hospital	
Providence Healthcare	1957	Scarborough	Unity Health Toronto	University of Toronto (community-affiliated)	House of Providence; Providence Villa and Hospital; Providence Centre	
Queensway Health Centre	1956	Etobicoke	Trillium Health Partners	University of Toronto (TAHSN associate members-affiliated)	Queensway General Hospital	
Centenary Hospital	1967	Scarborough	Scarborough Health Network	University of Toronto (community-affiliated)	Centenary Health Centre; Scarborough Centenary Hospital	
Runnymede Healthcare Centre	1945	Old Toronto			Runnymede Hospital	
Scarborough General Hospital	1956	Scarborough	Scarborough Health Network	University of Toronto (community-affiliated)	Scarborough General Hospital	
Birchmount Hospital	1985	Scarborough	Scarborough Health Network	University of Toronto (community-affiliated)	Scarborough Grace Hospital	
St. Joseph's Health Centre	1921	Old Toronto	Unity Health Toronto	University of Toronto (TAHSN associate members-affiliated)	St. Joseph's Hospital	
St. Michael's Hospital	1892	Old Toronto	Unity Health Toronto	University of Toronto (fully-affiliated)		
Sunnybrook Health Sciences Centre	1948	North York	Sunnybrook Health Sciences	University of Toronto (fully-affiliated)	Sunnybrook Military Hospital; Sunnybrook Hospital; Sunnybrook Medical Centre	
Sunnybrook Holland Centre	1955	North York	Sunnybrook Health Sciences	University of Toronto (fully-affiliated)	Orthopaedic and Arthritic Hospital	
St. John's Rehab Hospital	1937	North York	Sunnybrook Health Sciences	University of Toronto (fully-affiliated)	St. John's Convalescent Hospital	
Toronto General Hospital	1812	Old Toronto	University Health Network	University of Toronto (fully-affiliated)	York General Hospital	
Toronto Grace Health Centre	1905	Old Toronto	The Salvation Army		Toronto Grace Hospital	
Toronto Rehabilitation Institute: Bickle Centre, Lakeside Centre, Lyndhust Centre, Rumsey Centre - Cardiac / Neuro, University Centre	1998	Old Toronto	University Health Network	University of Toronto (fully-affiliated)		
Toronto Western Hospital	1895	Old Toronto	University Health Network	University of Toronto (fully-affiliated)		
West Park Healthcare Centre	1904	York	University Health Network	University of Toronto (community-affiliated)	Toronto Free Hospital for Consumptive Poor; Queen Mary Hospital for Tuberculous Children 1914–1970; The Toronto Hospital for Consumptives 1904-1970?; West Park Hospital	
Women's College Hospital	1883	Old Toronto		University of Toronto (fully-affiliated)		

== Closed hospitals ==
- Wellesley Hospital (1942–2001)
- Central Hospital 1957 as a private care centre and later became Sherbourne Health Centre in 2003.
- The Doctor's Hospital (1953–1997) – merged with Toronto Western Hospital in 1996, merged again with Toronto General Hospital and closed in 1997; site at 340 College Street now home to Kensington Health, a long-term care facility and hospice for seniors. Doctors Hospital Clinic on the site retains the site's old name.
- Queen Elizabeth Hospital - merged with Hillcrest Hospital to form Rehabilitation Institute of Toronto (now Toronto Rehabilitation Institute)
- Humber River Hospital, Church and Keele Sites – some sections temporarily closed for renovation and most duplicated acute care services moved to Wilson Site on October 18, 2015
- Central Military Convalescence Hospital (1915-1918?) - formerly Wykeham Hall and later College Street Armouries
- Orthopaedic Military Hospital at Yonge and Davisville - established during World War I to handle returning injuries soldiers
- Christie Street Veterans' Hospital (1919–1948) - later as Lambert Lodge and demolished 1981.
- Spadina Military Hospital (1914-1918?) - now 1 Spadina Crescent
- Northwestern Hospital, Keele Street

== See also ==
- Health in Toronto
- Hospitals in York Region
- Hospitals in Canada
