= Tanis Doe =

Canadian academic

Tanis Doe (June 20, 1966 – August 4, 2004) was a Métis (Ojibway/French Canadian) academic, and activist. She worked as a professor at several institutions across the United States and Canada. She was known for her research on participatory action, and worked covering topics in the categories of disability, abuse, genders, sexualities, employment, assistive technology, and advocacy.

== Early life and education ==
As a teenager, Doe worked for two summers at the Jack Purcell Community Centre summer camp for disabled children in Ottawa.

In 1984, while studying political science at Carleton University, Doe was named Ottawa Youth of the Year. At the time, she volunteered with the Canadian Hearing Society, the Canadian National Institute for the Blind, and Run For Light, a marathon for blind runners. She went on to earn a Bachelor of Arts Degree (B.A.) in political science and a Master's Degree in Social Work (M.S.W) from Carleton University, and a PhD in Sociology and Education from the University of Alberta.

== Career ==
After graduating from Carleton University, Doe worked for the Canadian federal Secretary of State department.

Doe worked in the department of Social Work and Disability Studies at The University of Victoria. Doe also worked for Royal Roads University, Ryerson University, now TMU, and University of Washington. Doe's work at Washington was in the area of bioethics in which she also was a Washington Fulbright Scholar. In 2003, Doe directed research for organizations across the United States and Canada. She also worked as a consultant for organizations world-wide. Doe sometimes wrote under the pen name Vicky D'Aoust.

In 1998, Doe co-founded the first Changing Borders conference, which was aimed towards disabled women.

Her namesake awards include The Tanis Doe Postdoctoral Fellowship in Gender, Disability, and Social Justice, and the Tanis Doe Award, first awarded in 2009.

== Personal life ==
Tanis Doe was married to Corbett O'Toole and identified as queer. She had two children: her daughter Ann Marie, and step-daughter Meecha. Doe lived in Victoria, British Columbia.

Doe was a wheelchair user and self-described "marginal member of the Deaf community", who could speak and was not born deaf, but also had a deaf child who was raised within Deaf schools and the Deaf community.

She died August 4, 2004 of a pulmonary embolism.

== Books and publications ==
- Doe, Tanis (1994). "Multiple Minorities: Communities Within the Deaf Community". In Erting, Carol (ed.). The Deaf Way: Perspectives from the International Conference on Deaf Culture. Gallaudet University Press. pp. 464–468. ISBN 978-1-56368-026-7.
- D'Aoust, Vicky (1995). "Non-existent and Struggling for Identity". In Arnup, Katherine (ed.). Lesbian Parenting: Living with Pride and Prejudice. Gynergy Press.
- Studying Disability; Connecting People, Programs and Policies - Referenced and accredited across many disability studies programs
- Doe, Tanis (2004). "The Difficulty with Deafness Discourse and Disability Culture". Review of Disability Studies. 1 (1). ISSN 1552-9215.
  - Doe's explains how her self-identity as a Deaf woman, with other disabilities, and her experience raising her Deaf daughter, Ann Marie, informed much of her work
- Yeager, Patricia; Kaye, H. Stephen; Reed, Myisha; Doe, Tanis M. (2006-12-01). "Assistive technology and employment: Experiences of Californians with disabilities". WORK. 27 (4). SAGE Publications: 333–344. doi:10.3233/WOR-2006-00578. ISSN 1051-9815.
- Doe, Tanis; Ladouceur, Barbara (2009). "To Be or Not to Be? Whose Question Is It, Anyway?". In Michalko, Rod; Titchkosky, Tanya (eds.). Rethinking Normalcy: A Disability Studies Reader. Canadian Scholars' Press. ISBN 978-1-55130-363-5.
- Enabling Income: CPP Disability Benefits and Women with Disabilities - Tanis Doe and Sally Kimpson shared on the government of Canada's publication website
- Re/Working Benefits: Continuation of Non-Cash Benefits Support for Single Mothers and Disabled Women - Shared on the government of Canada's publication website written by Tanis Doe and Doris Rajan with Claire Abbott
