= Anne Ayres =

Anne Ayres (January 3, 1816 – February 9, 1896) was a nun and the founder of the first Episcopalian religious order for women.

== Biography ==
Born in London, she emigrated to the United States with her parents in 1836. She settled in New York City and tutored the daughters of wealthy families.

In the summer of 1845, Ayres heard a speech by Episcopal clergyman William Augustus Muhlenberg and decided to follow a religious life. Muhlenberg, who deliberately never married, founded the Church of the Holy Communion in New York City in 1846. This parish church embodied his rich version of the liturgy (with flowers, music and color), as well as recognition of the need for social services within the parish (hence free pews, an unemployment fund, a school, and country trips for poor urban children).

Ayres gathered other women to teach at the school and do other charity work. They formed the Sisterhood of the Holy Communion (with Ayres as First Sister, having taken religious vows in a private ceremony before Muhlenberg on All Saints Day, 1845). Aware of longstanding prejudice against religious orders since the Protestant Reformation 300 years earlier, the new order did not wear habits, but had a secular dress code, as well as took renewable vows for three years at a time. The House of Bishops formally recognized the new order (the first religious order for women in the Episcopal Church) in 1852.

The order opened an infirmary in 1853, then provided nursing and other services at St. Luke's Hospital. From 1858 to 1877, Ayres both directed nursing and administered the hospital. However, in 1863, five women, led by Harriet Starr Cannon left the Sisterhood, and formed what ultimately became the Community of St. Mary, and which ultimately survived the sisterhood.

In 1870, Ayres also helped Muhlenberg found St. Johnland, a deliberately Christian community built on 500 acres of woodland and fields near Kings Park, Suffolk County on the northern part of Long Island This was designed to provide a haven for needy families from the city, as well as a refuge for the aged, handicapped children and urban youth.

In 1864, Ayers published her first book, anonymously, Practical Thoughts on Sisterhoods. Three years later, she published Evangelical Sisterhoods: Two Letters to a Friend and in 1875 Evangelical Catholic Papers. In 1880, three years after his death, Ayres first published The Life and Work of William Augustus Muhlenberg.

== Death and legacy ==
Ayres died in 1896 at the hospital she founded. She is buried at the St. Johnland cemetery, as is Muhlenberg.

The sisterhood she founded remained active until 1940, and the hospital is now merged into the Roosevelt Hospital Centers. The St. Johnland community they founded continues to this day, under the guidance of a board of directors, although since the 1950s it has concentrated on providing care for the elderly, and it has recently partnered with a real estate developer.
