= Centenary Hospital =

- Scarborough Health Network
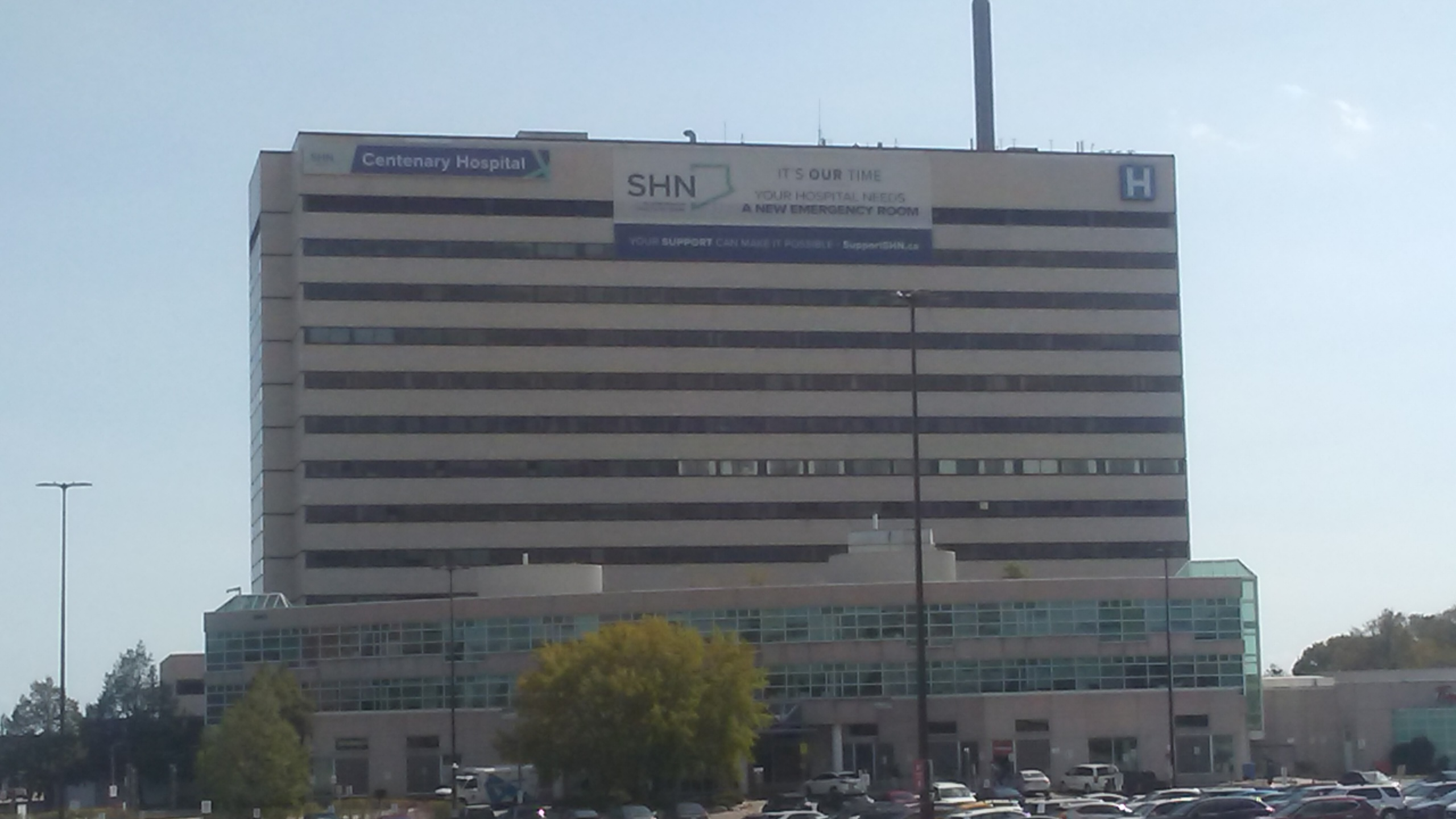

Geography
- Location: 2867 Ellesmere Road; Toronto, Ontario; M1E 4B9
- Coordinates: 43°46′48″N 79°12′17″W

Organisation
- Care system: Medicare
- Type: General
- Affiliated university: Temerty Faculty of Medicine (University of Toronto)

Services
- Emergency department: Yes
- Beds: 307

History
- Founded: July 1, 1967

Links
- Website: http://www.shn.ca/

Centenary Hospital is a hospital in Scarborough, Toronto, Ontario, Canada. It was opened on July 1, 1967, and was named in honour of the 100th anniversary of Canada. Since 2016, the hospital is operated by the Scarborough Health Network.

== History ==
The hospital opened on July 1, 1967, as Scarborough Centenary Hospital and was the second hospital in the township of Scarborough, after the Scarborough General Hospital. Expansions were constructed in 1986 and 1991, when it became known as Centenary Health Centre.

The hospital merged with the Ajax and Pickering General Hospital in 1998 to create the Rouge Valley Health System. Under the new network, the hospital was officially known as Rouge Valley Centenary.

On December 1, 2016, the Rouge Valley Health System dissolved as the campuses of The Scarborough Hospital (General and Birchmount) and Rouge Valley Centenary merged to form a new administration, tentatively as the Scarborough and Rouge Hospital, and later the Scarborough Health Network in 2018. The Ajax and Pickering campus joined Lakeridge Health.
