= St John the Divine, Kennington =

Coordinates: 51.477584°N 0.106268°W

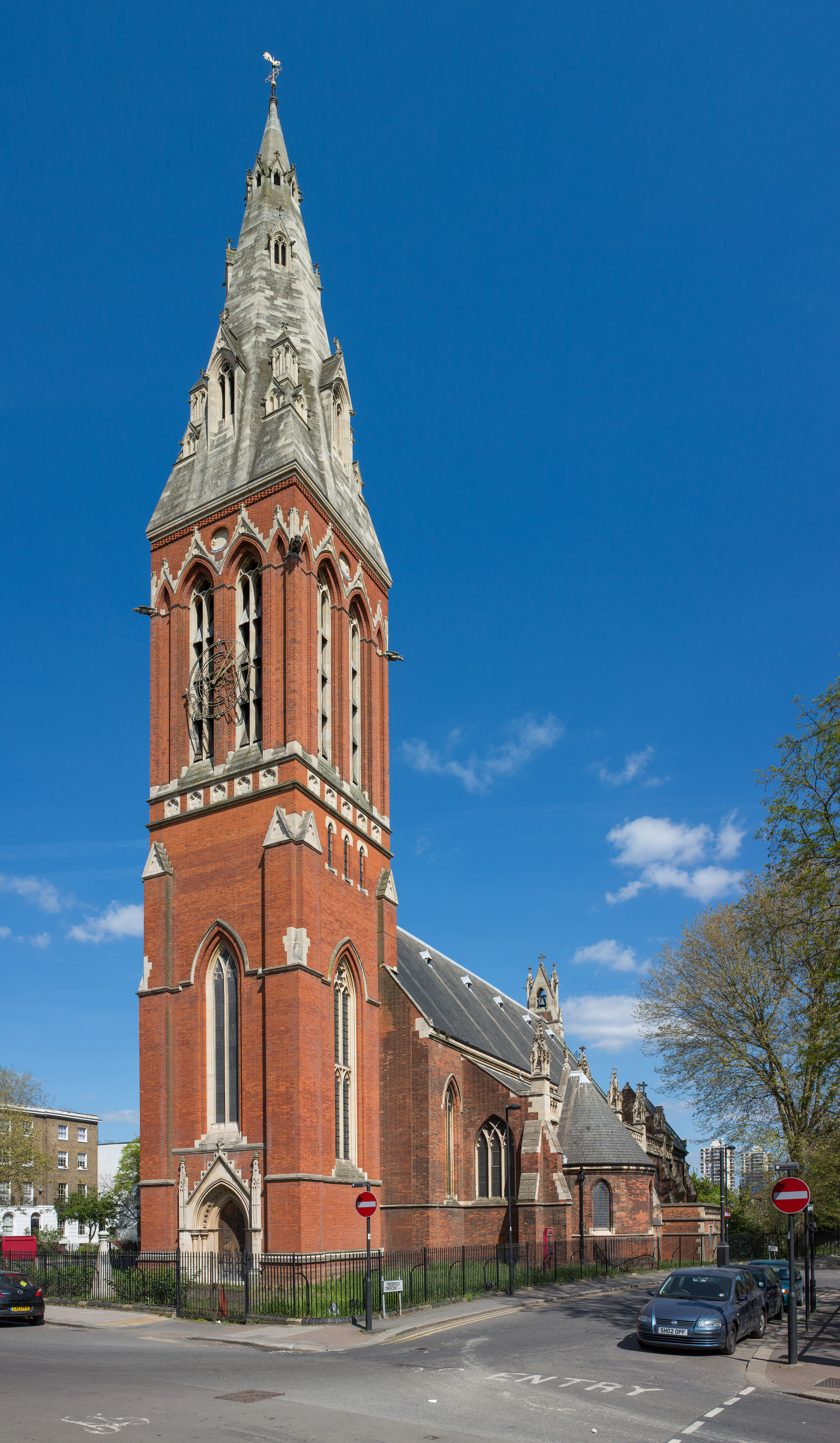
- Photo of the church
- St John the Divine, Kennington
- Location: Vassall Road, Kennington, London
- Country: England
- Denomination: Church of England
- Churchmanship: Anglo-Catholic
- Website: www.sjdk.org

History
- Founded: 14 November 1874
- Founder: The Reverend Daniel Elsdale

Architecture
- Architect: George Edmund Street
- Style: Gothic Revival architecture
- Years built: 1871 through 1874

Administration
- Diocese: Anglican Diocese of Southwark
- Parish: Kennington

Clergy
- Vicar: Fr Mark Williams

St John the Divine, Kennington, is an Anglican church in London. The parish of Kennington is within the Anglican Diocese of Southwark. The church was designed by the architect George Edmund Street (who also built the Royal Courts of Justice on Strand, London) in the Decorated Gothic style, and was built between 1871 and 1874. Today it is a Grade I listed building.

The church stands on Vassall Road, Kennington, in Myatt's Fields Ward in the London Borough of Lambeth. It is near Oval tube station and the Oval Cricket Ground. The spire can be seen clearly for miles around.

== Architecture ==
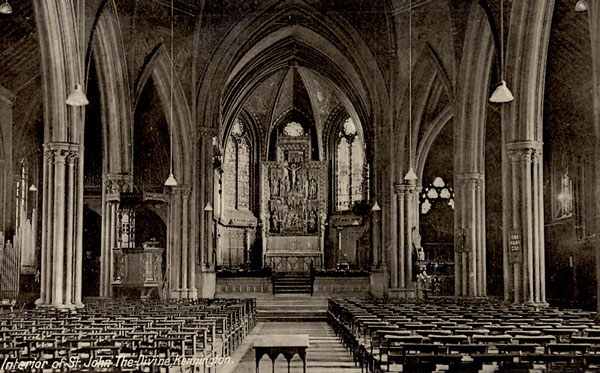
The original interior, c.1900

The church is regarded as a fine example of Victorian Gothic, and is Grade I listed. The general construction is of red brick, but all parapets, window openings, doorways, etc. are dressed with stone. The upper part of the spire is entirely of stone. At 61 metres or 200 feet, it is the tallest spire in south London and can be seen for miles around. The poet John Betjeman remarked that St John the Divine was "the most magnificent church in South London."

The original church interior was designed by George Frederick Bodley (founder of Watts & Co.), and was fitted out in a highly ornate style typical of the Victorian era and of Anglo-Catholic churches, including stone carvings by Thomas Earp, wrought iron altar rails, stained glass windows, and a carved reredos painted by Clayton and Bell. A new organ by J. W. Walker & Sons Ltd was installed in 1875.

The church suffered severe bomb damage in 1941 during the Blitz, and most of the original interior fittings were lost. After years of restoration work under the direction of H. S. Goodhart-Rendel, St John the Divine re-opened in September 1958.

=== The tower and gargoyles ===
The spire and tower were extensively restored in 1994, and a new set of carved grotesques and gargoyles was added. Many of the carvings are in the form of caricature representations of members of the church congregation, the British royal family or the clergy. The Queen, Prince Charles, Prince William and Archbishop Michael Ramsey are among the better-known figures depicted.

=== Stained glass ===
The majority of the original stained glass was destroyed in the 1941 bombing, which was replaced with plain glass windows in the north and south aisles by Goodhart-Rendel. Some original stained glass designed by Charles Eamer Kempe has survived, including the west window beneath the tower and two windows in the south aisle chapel.

Between c.1958 and 1959, W. T. Carter Shapland was commissioned to provide three new stained glass windows for the eastern apse, which he designed in a modern idiom of bold colour and line. The central window, positioned directly above the high altar, depicts in its left light the enthroned Christ in Heaven presiding over the Last Judgement. Below are the Four Horsemen of the Apocalypse and a seated John the Divine in the act of writing the Book of Revelation. In the right light, Michael the Archangel is shown casting the fallen angels down into hell. Flanking this are two windows depicting episodic scenes from the life of Christ. The left window shows the Annunciation, the Adoration of the Shepherds, the Presentation in the Temple, Christ in the workshop of his father, the Baptism of Christ, and the Calling of the Fishermen. The right window depicts Christ's Entry into Jerusalem, the Last Supper, the Arrest in the Garden, Christ before Pontius Pilate, the Crucifixion, and the Three Marys at the Empty Tomb.

Shapland provided a second window for the church in c.1962, installed in the east wall of the All Souls chapel south of the chancel. It illustrates a passage from the New Testament in which the risen Christ is revealed again in glory to those who await him. Christ is shown in the central light, crowned and with his right hand raised in blessing, above text from Epistle to the Hebrews 9:28: "unto them that look for him shall he appear the second time". In the lights to either side are historical and contemporary figures depicted in the act of worship, awaiting Christ's return. The window is close in style to Shapland's much larger commission for the Great West Window at Chester Cathedral, made around the same time.

=== Murals ===
Behind the altar is a set of murals painted by Brian Thomas in 1966. The left-hand panel depicts the Virgin Mary and Jesus in a floral garden. A central panel is decorated with lilies and roses – traditional Marian symbols. The right-hand panel is a pietà, with Mary holding the body of the crucified Christ, and instead of a floral border it is framed with thorns, representing the crown of thorns.

=== The Korean Icon ===
Above the North door hangs the 'Korean Icon'. Designed in the style of a Greek Orthodox iconostasis, it depicts various figures from the Christian Gospels. It was dedicated as a memorial to Bishop Charles John Corfe, who founded the Anglican Church of Korea in 1890.

=== The Kelham Rood ===
On the south side of the nave stands the Kelham Rood, a life-size bronze sculpture of Christ on the Cross together with free-standing figures of St John and the Virgin Mary. It is the work of sculptor Charles Sargeant Jagger (1885–1934), who also designed the Royal Artillery Memorial in London's Hyde Park Corner, and was completed in 1929.

The sculpture was originally commissioned by the Society of the Sacred Mission (SSM) for the Great Chapel at Kelham Hall in Nottinghamshire. The sculpture then stood in the SSM Priory in Willen (Milton Keynes), before being moved to St John the Divine.

The original plan to suspend the sculpture above the high altar was not put into effect. It has, instead, been placed at floor level in full and close view of the congregation (see pictures below).

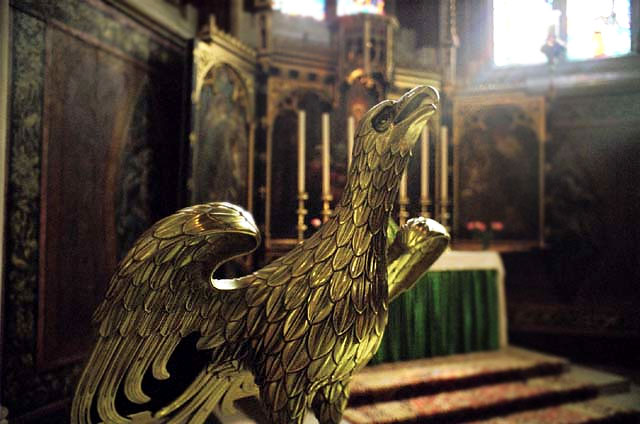
The lectern

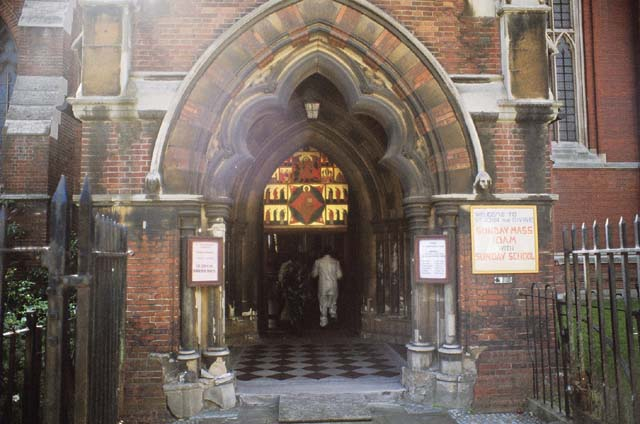
The main door

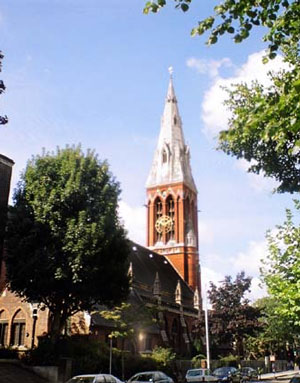
The spire, seen on Vassall Road

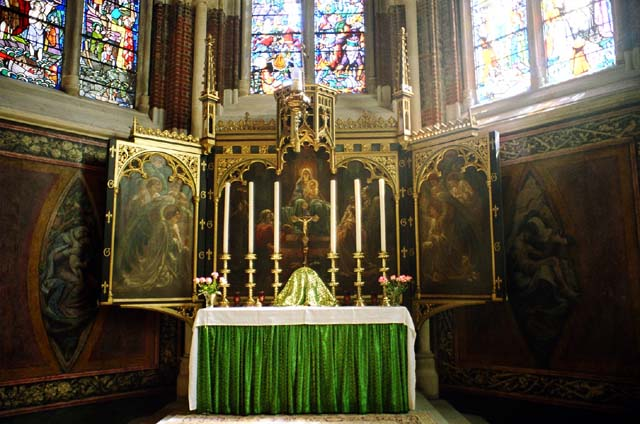
The High Altar in Ordinary Time

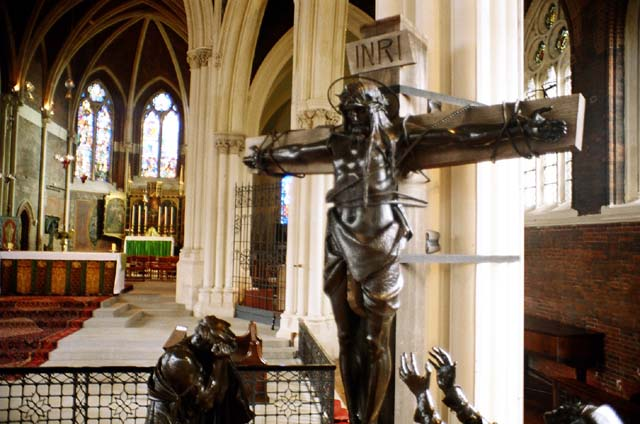
The Kelham Rood and the sanctuary

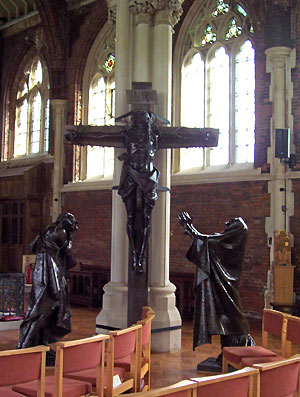
Jagger's Kelham Rood

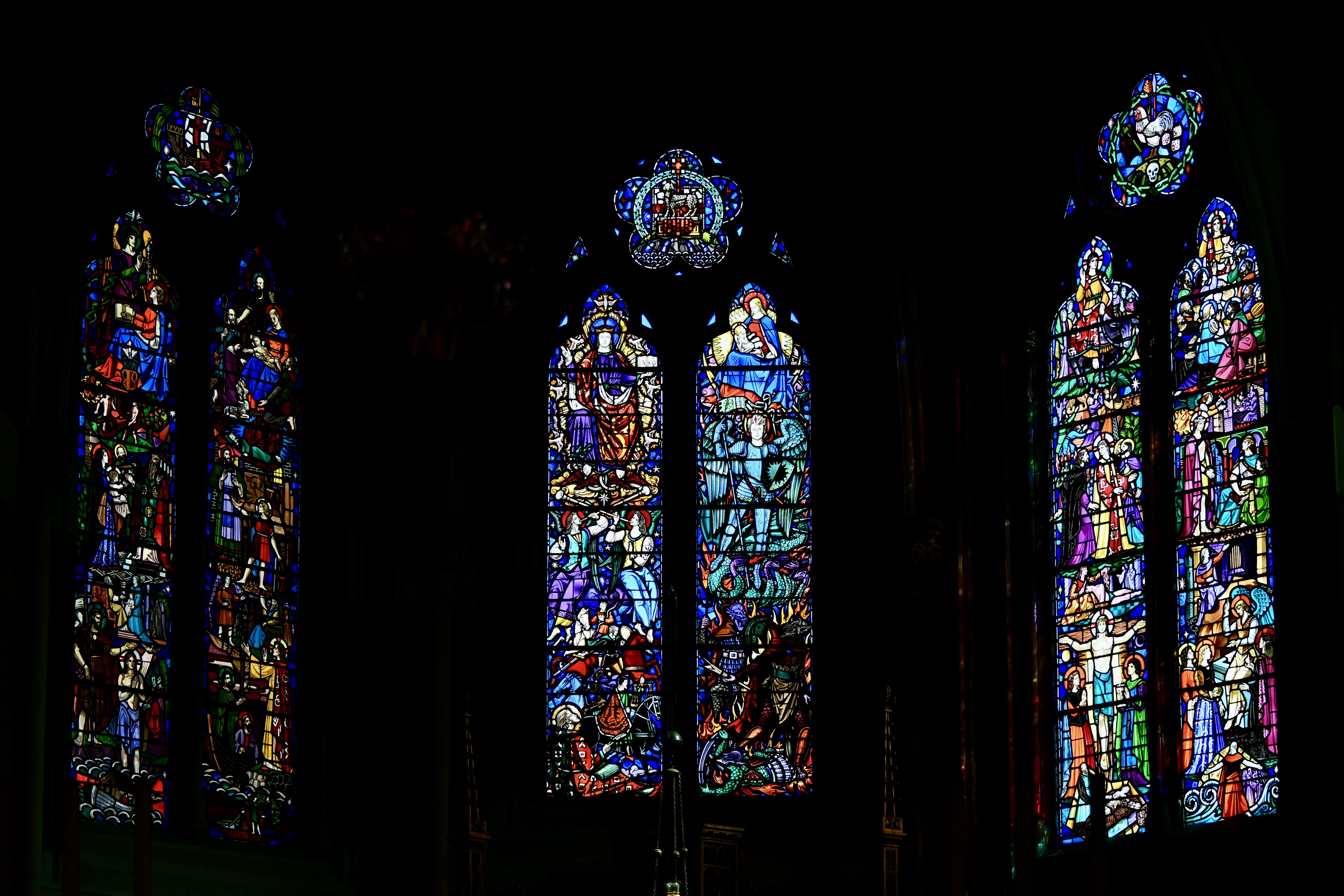
Apse windows by W. T. Carter Shapland

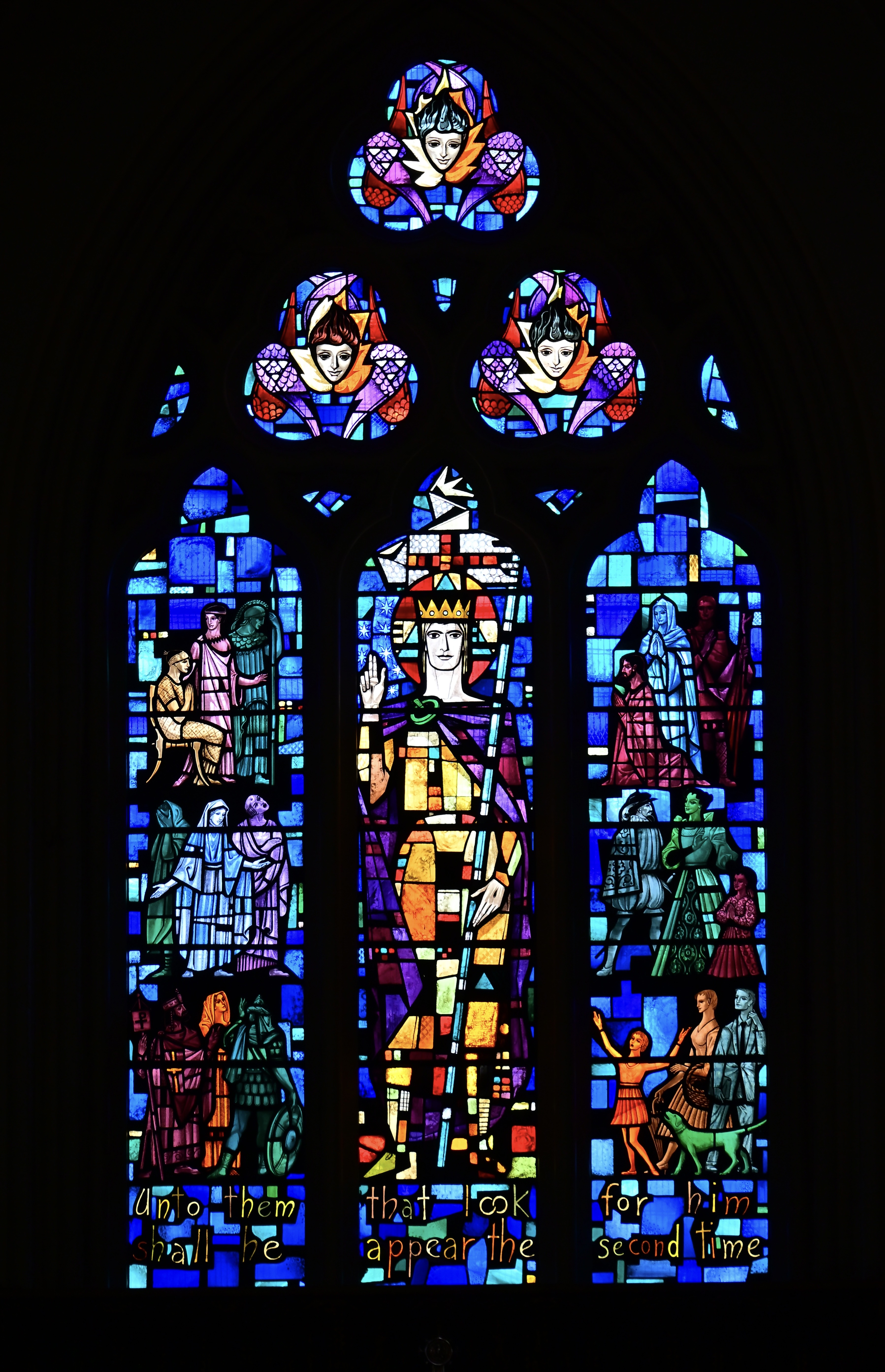
All Souls chapel window by W. T. Carter Shapland

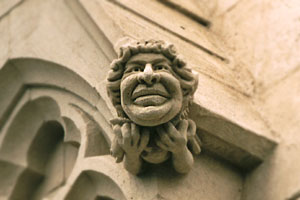
A carving of Queen Elizabeth II, depicted holding a corgi

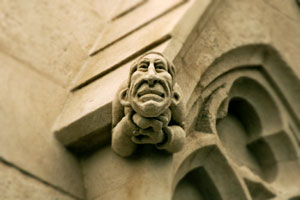
A carving of Prince Charles

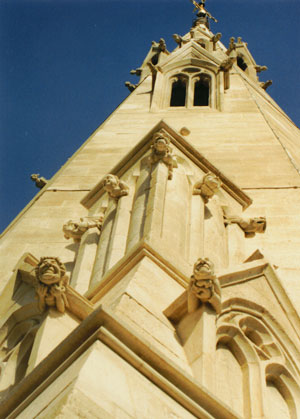
The gargoyles on the spire, seen from below

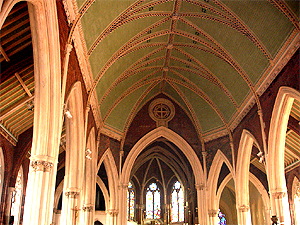
The nave roof, decorated by GF Bodley in 1890

== Worship ==
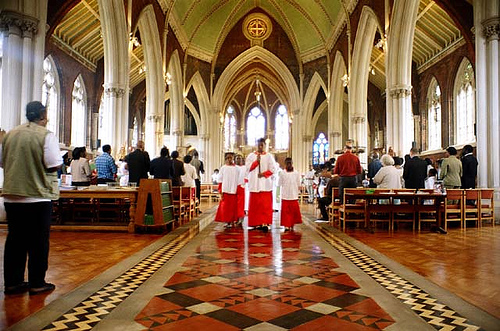
High Mass at St John the Divine

Since its foundation in 1871, St John the Divine has been affiliated with the Anglican high church. The second vicar, the Rev. Charles Edward Brooke, was associated with the Oxford Movement and its work in impoverished city parishes. At this time, ritualistic practices in the Church of England were limited by the Public Worship Regulation Act 1874.

The High Anglican style of worship is reflected in the design and decoration of the church, with the presence of devotional statues, icons, sanctuary lamps and the Reserved sacrament.The high church traditions continue today, and services in this church are generally in the Anglo-Catholic style, with an emphasis on sacraments, liturgy and ceremony. On Sundays and holy days, clergy wear decorated robes, a choir sings the Mass, and incense is used. Through the week, Mass is said daily. The liturgy is usually based on the Common Worship prayer book (2000).

The Sisterhood of St. John the Divine, an Anglican religious order, is indirectly named after this church, for its foundress, Hannah Grier Coome found spiritual comfort in the parish during her residence in Britain.

== Notable clergy ==
- Cyril Easthaugh (1897–1988), curate and vicar; later Bishop of Kensington and of Bishop of Peterborough
- Cathrew Fisher (1871–1929), assistant curate; later Bishop of Nyasaland
- John Hall (born 1949), curate; later Dean of Westminster

== See also ==
- List of churches and cathedrals of London
- List of Anglo-Catholic Churches
- British and Irish stained glass (1811–1918)
