= Toronto Women's Hospital =

Toronto Women's Hospital may refer to:

- Toronto Grace Health Centre, known as Toronto Women's Hospital prior to 1937
- Women's College Hospital
