= Lakeridge Health Port Perry =

Coordinates: 44°06′19″N 078°57′17″W

- Lakeridge Health Corporation

Geography
- Location: Port Perry, Ontario, Canada

Organization
- Care system: Ontario Health Insurance Plan (OHIP)
- Funding: Public hospital

Services
- Emergency department: Yes
- Helipad: TC LID: CPX6

History
- Opened: 1946

Links
- Website: lakeridgehealth.on.ca
- Lists: Hospitals in Canada

Lakeridge Health Port Perry is a hospital located in Port Perry, Ontario, Canada. The hospital serves the townships of Scugog, Brock and Uxbridge in Durham Region.

== History ==
The hospital was founded as the private in 1946 at a home at 96 John Street as the Port Perry Hospital, but closed to cost of upgrading the old building in 1948. In 1949 residences used for munitions workers were moved from Ajax, Ontario and moved to Port Perry. During the interim Oshawa Hospital served the community from 1949 to 1953. The new Community Memorial opened in 1953 as a 32-bed facility. It moved again in 1969 to its current location on Paxton Street.

In April 1997, under the Common Sense Revolution, the hospital was amalgamated with Uxbridge Cottage Hospital to form North Durham Health Services (NDHS). Uxbridge became linked with Markham-Stouffvile Hospital in 2004.

In 1998 the hospital, along with Memorial Hospital Bowmanville, Oshawa General Hospital and Whitby General Hospital, were placed under the administration of the Lakeridge Health Corporation. The hospital was renamed, and Uxbridge Cottage was placed under the jurisdiction of the Markham-Stouffville Hospital Corporation.

On August 25, 2017 a fire occurred at the hospital, damaging some key systems, resulting in the temporary closure of the hospital. The hospital reopened on September 5, 2018.

== Facilities ==
The main building (with ambulatory entrance) is named Stephen Roman Wing.

The hospital has a helipad located on the southside of the hospital facing Paxton Street and located west of the south parking lot. The helipad allows patients to be transferred to other hospitals for more advance care not available at the Port Perry site or patients arriving to Port Perry other than regular ambulances.

== Services ==
The current hospital has 180 staff members and 20 physicians, with a 24/7 emergency room, acute care, continuing care, and surgery.

- Medicine
- Emergency
- Surgical Services and Outpatient Clinics
- Ambulatory Rehabilitation Centre
- New Life Centre (Maternal/Child Program)
- Respiratory Therapy
- Pharmacy
- Laboratory
- Diagnostic Imaging
- Ultrasound
- Infection Prevention and Control
- Diabetes Education
- Social Work
- Palliative Care
- Mental Health
- Spiritual Services
- Volunteer Services

== See also ==
- Lakeridge Health Oshawa
- Lakeridge Health Whitby
- Lakeridge Health Bowmanville
