= Uxbridge Cottage Hospital =

- Oak Valley Health
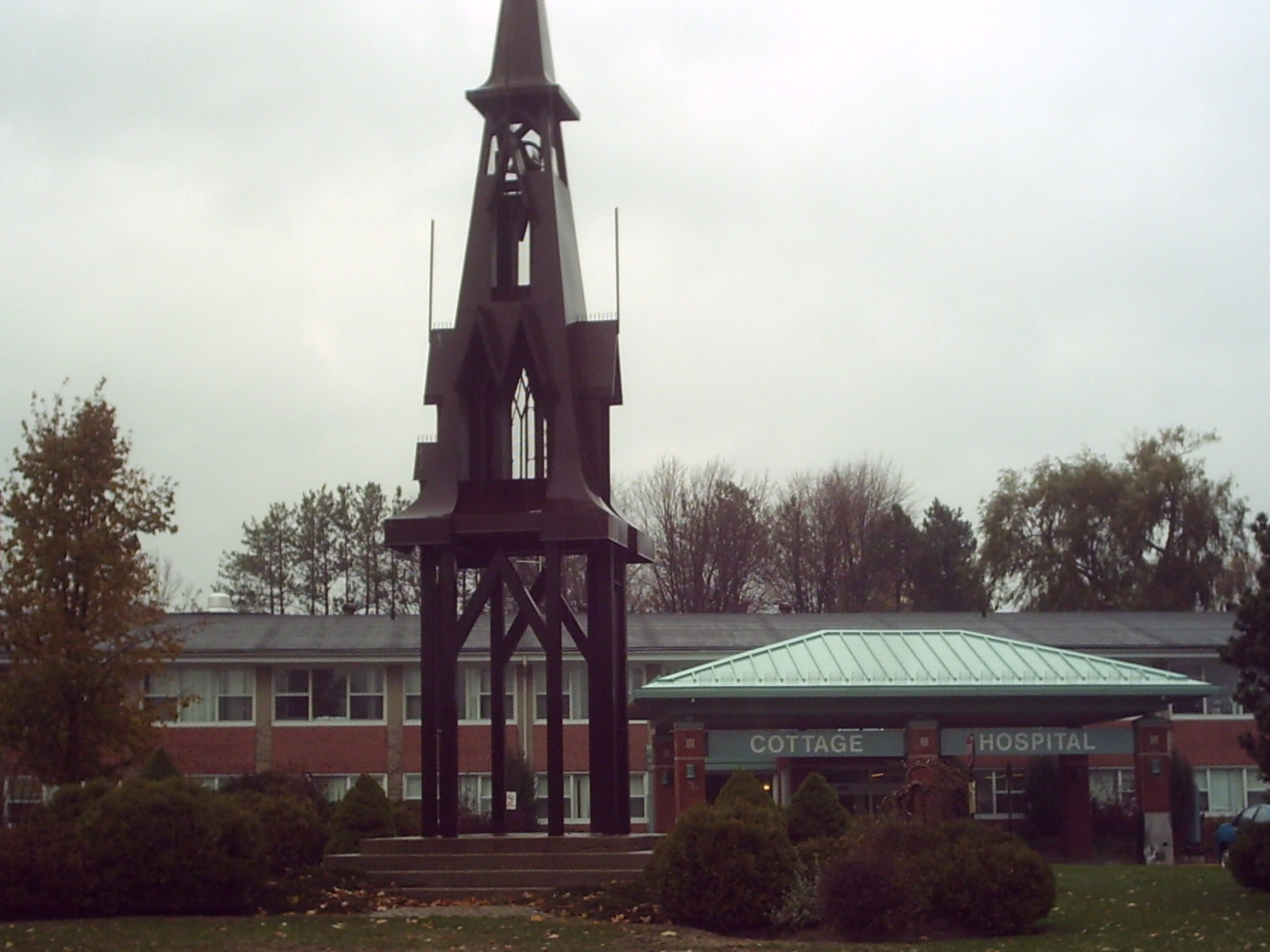
- Uxbridge Cottage Hospital

- Location in Ontario

Geography
- Location: Uxbridge, Ontario, Canada
- Coordinates: 44°06′10″N 79°07′38″W

Organization
- Care system: Public Medicare (Canada) (OHIP)
- Type: Community

Services
- Emergency department: Full service
- Beds: 20

Helipads
- Helipad: TC LID: CNA5

History
- Founded: 1958

Links
- Website: www.msh.on.ca
- Lists: Hospitals in Canada

Uxbridge Cottage Hospital is a cottage hospital in Uxbridge, Ontario.

== History ==
Opened in 1958 after a decade of planning, Uxbridge Hospital has undergone renovations with additions in 1967 and 1996 to 1998 (covered area at the main entrance and interior renovations).

The hospital has a helipad located west of the main wing for transfers out of Uxbridge and a walkway connecting to Testa Professional Building at 2 Campbell Drive.

The Recognition Tower, a 12m tall steel bell tower located outside the hospital, was unveiled in 1990.

In April 1997, under the Common Sense Revolution, the hospital was amalgamated with Community Memorial Hospital Port Perry to form North Durham Health Services (NDHS). NDHS ceased to exist in 1998. Uxbridge Cottage Hospital was affiliated with Lakeridge Health Centre in Oshawa, and was known as Lakeridge Health, Uxbridge, from 1998 until Jan 5, 2004, when the hospital was placed under the jurisdiction of the Markham Stouffville Hospital Corporation.

Though the hospital originally had 49 beds, the number has been reduced to 20. Uxbridge Cottage also provides a 24-hour emergency department, primary care and some secondary care services to the township of Uxbridge.

== Services ==
- outpatient programs
- diagnostic services
- emergency room and inpatient care
- walk-in clinic
- family practice
- rehabilitation
- complex continuing care
- palliative care
