= Scarborough General Hospital (Toronto) =

Hospital in Toronto, Ontario, Canada

- Scarborough Health Network
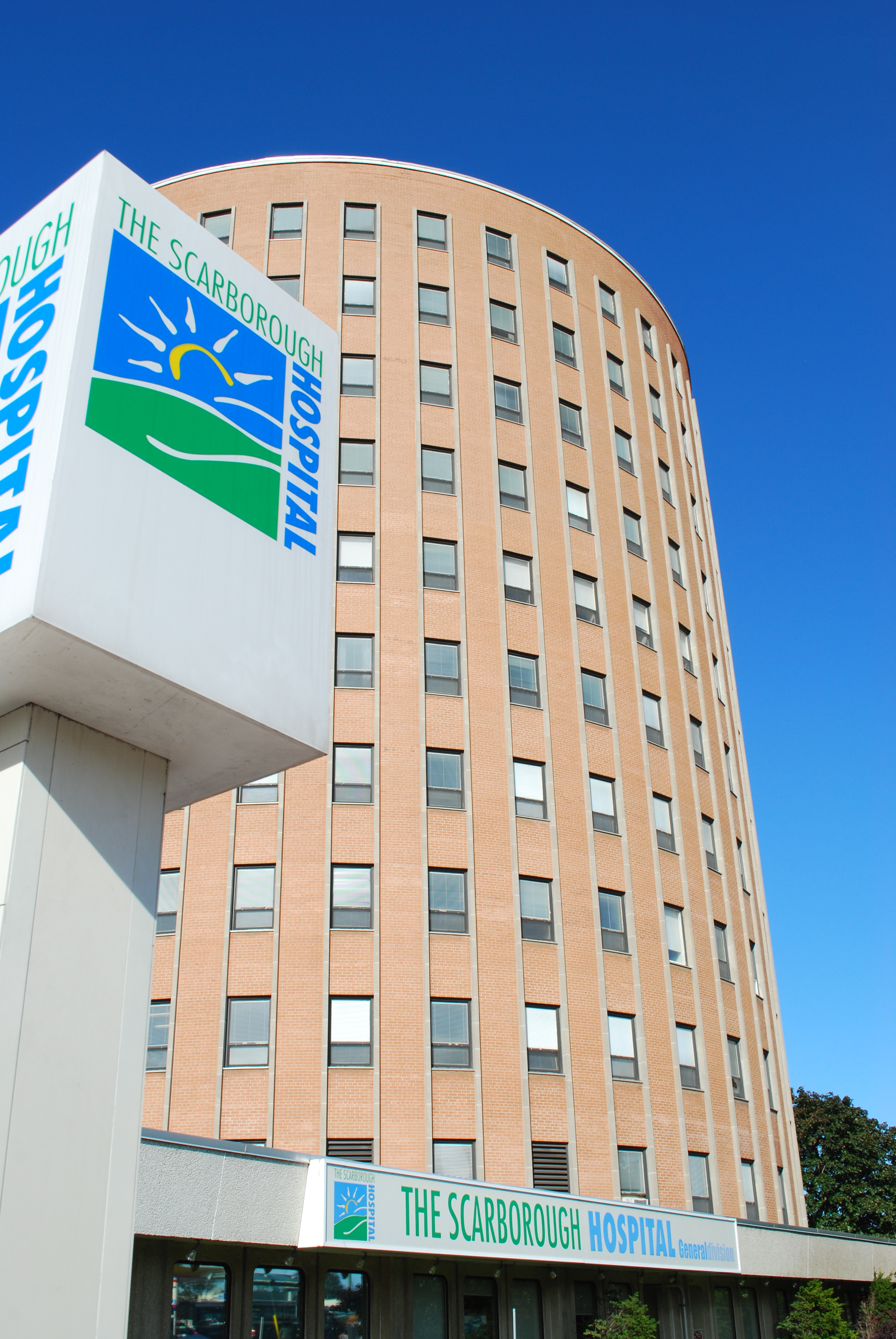
- Scarborough General Hospital, circa 2012, under the former The Scarborough Hospital branding.

Geography
- Location: 3050 Lawrence Avenue East; Toronto, Ontario; M1P 2V5
- Coordinates: 43°45′21″N 79°14′49″W

Organisation
- Care system: Medicare
- Type: Community
- Affiliated university: Temerty Faculty of Medicine (University of Toronto)

Services
- Emergency department: Yes
- Beds: 556

History
- Founded: 1956

Links
- Website: www.shn.ca

The Scarborough General Hospital is a major teaching hospital in Toronto, Ontario, Canada that is the largest and oldest hospital in Scarborough, and one of three hospitals in the Scarborough Health Network. Located northwest of the intersection of McCowan Road and Lawrence Avenue East, the hospital opened in 1956 as the first in the former township of Scarborough.

== History ==
The Scarborough General Hospital was founded by the Sisters of Misericorde in 1956 as the first hospital in the borough of Scarborough. In 1998, The Salvation Army, who founded the Scarborough Grace Hospital (now known as Birchmount Hospital), took over administrative duties of the Scarborough General and formed a new hospital network known as The Scarborough Hospital as part of a proposal to the Health Services Restructuring Commission. Under the new administration, the hospital campus was officially known as The Scarborough Hospital, General Division, although the former name was still used by locals.

In 2009, the Scarborough General Hospital opened a CA$72 million Emergency and Critical Care Centre in its new West Wing. The project, which more than doubled the size of the previous emergency department, features new infection control and isolation protocols as well as five care zones that are designed to provide the appropriate level of care for specific patients' acuities—Pediatric, Rapid Assessment, Critical Care, Acute Care and Ambulatory Care. The new wing is also home to a 22-bed Critical Care Centre that consolidates patients from the previous Intensive Care Unit, Coronary Care Unit and Acute Medical Unit. A Satellite Diagnostic Imaging department also opened in the West Wing, with the Greater Toronto Area's first Siemens YSIO DR-X-ray units that result in faster images and a more comfortable experience for both patients and technologists. The hospital is also the first in the world to run two key diagnostic imaging systems (Agfa HealthCare's IMPAX 6.3.1 and Cardiovascular 7.7,) on an integrated platform—a major benefit for cardiac patients who can now get faster, more accurate diagnoses and treatment.

On December 1, 2016, the campuses of The Scarborough Hospital (General and Birchmount) and the Centenary Hospital merged to form a new administrative network, the Scarborough Health Network.

== See also ==
- List of hospitals in Toronto
