= Lakeridge Health Oshawa =

- Lakeridge Health Corporation
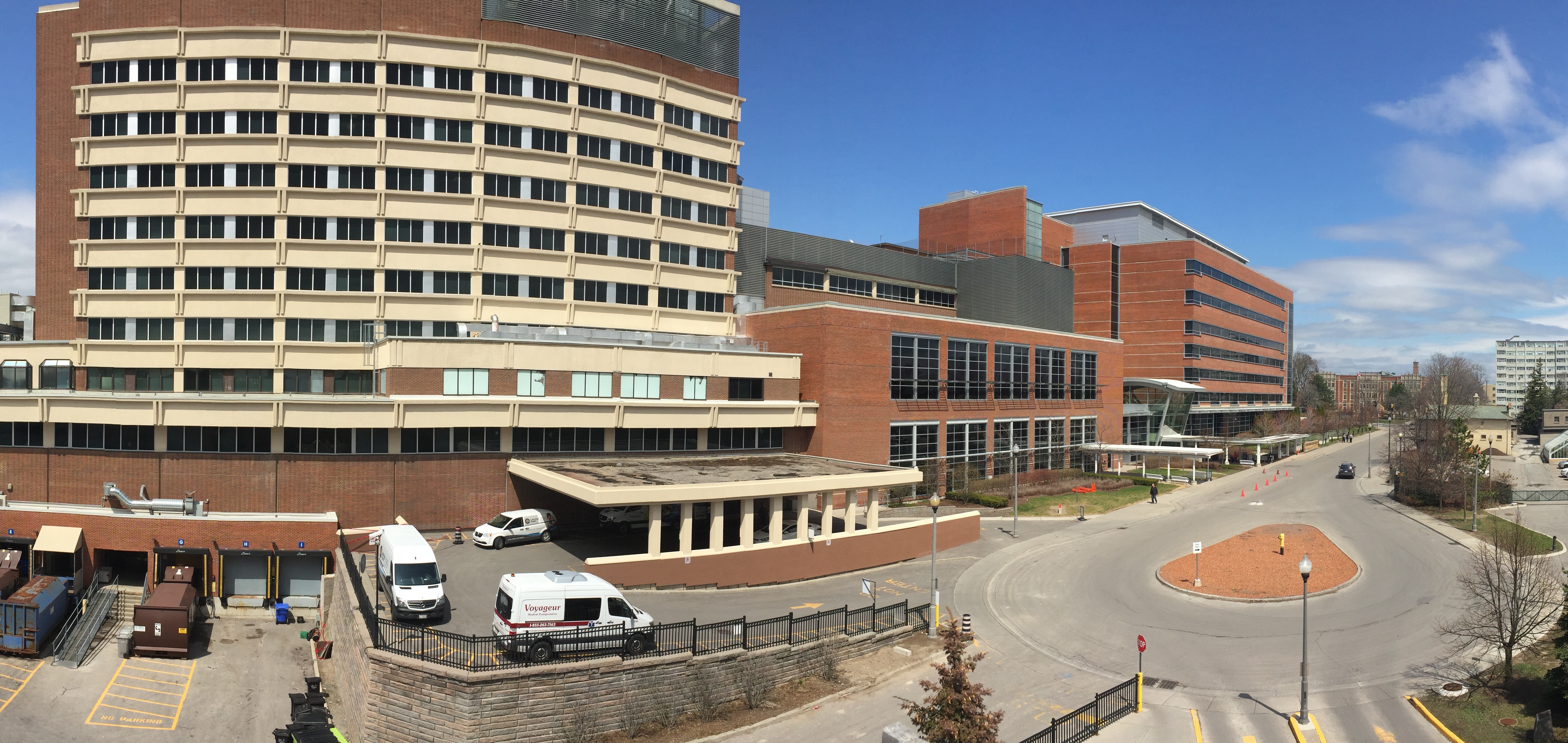

Geography
- Location: 1 Hospital Court; Oshawa, Ontario; L1G 2B9
- Coordinates: 43°54′20″N 78°52′10″W

Organisation
- Care system: Ontario Health Insurance Plan (OHIP)
- Type: General; Ontario Classification: Groups B, E, G, M and N

Services
- Emergency department: Yes
- Beds: 363

History
- Founded: 1910

Links
- Website: http://www.lakeridgehealth.on.ca

Lakeridge Health Oshawa, formerly Oshawa General Hospital, is a hospital located in Oshawa, Ontario, Canada. It was founded in August 1910 in a two-story building, and major additions were made in the 1920s (surgical and maternity wings). "G" Wing opened in 1970 on the occasion of the hospital's 60th anniversary.

In 1998 the hospital, along with Memorial Hospital Bowmanville, North Durham Health Services, and Whitby General Hospital were placed under the administration of the Lakeridge Health Corporation. The hospital was renamed and, with the closing of Whitby General as a full-service hospital, was given health responsibility over both Oshawa and Whitby.

The hospital is now the largest in Regional Municipality of Durham, with 363 beds, and 75,000 emergency visits and 27,600 surgeries a year (information from 2006/2007).

A new north wing opened in January 2007, and further expansion is expected to increase total capacity to 637 beds by 2011.

== See also ==
- Lakeridge Health Whitby
- Lakeridge Health Port Perry
- Lakeridge Health Bowmanville
