= Lakeridge Health =

Geography
- Location: Durham Region, Ontario, Canada
- Coordinates: 43°54′20″N 78°52′10″W

Organization
- Care system: Medicare
- Type: Community
- Affiliated university: University of Toronto

Services
- Emergency department: Yes

History
- Opened: 1998

Links
- Website: https://www.lakeridgehealth.on.ca

Lakeridge Health is a health system and hospital network serving Durham Region, Ontario in the eastern part of the Greater Toronto Area. It operates four acute hospitals with emergency departments (Bowmanville, Oshawa, Port Perry, Ajax and Pickering), one specialty hospital with a regional mandate (Whitby) and a variety of offsite locations. Lakeridge Health is part of the Central East Local Health Integration Network (CE LHIN) and a community-affiliated hospital of the University of Toronto.

== History ==
After a recommendation from the Health Services Restructuring Commission in 1998, the Ontario government amalgamated four Durham area hospitals: Memorial Hospital Bowmanville, North Durham Health Services (consisting of Community Memorial Hospital Port Perry and Uxbridge Cottage Hospital), Oshawa General Hospital and Whitby General Hospital – to create what is now known as Lakeridge Health. In January 2004, the Uxbridge site became aligned with Markham Stouffville Hospital and left the Lakeridge grouping.

With the merger of Rouge Valley Health System and The Scarborough Hospital, management of the Rouge Valley Ajax and Pickering site was transferred to Lakeridge Health on December 1, 2016.

The President and Chief Executive Officer is Cynthia Davis.

On May 13, 2017, Lakeridge Health was attacked by the WannaCry ransomware attack among many other institutions around the globe. By afternoon, most areas were up and running again.

On April 26, 2018, Lakeridge Health launched an online platform MyChart for patients to manage their health information.

== Services ==
Lakeridge Health offers primary, secondary, tertiary and post-acute care in inpatient and ambulatory settings. Services differ at the acute hospital sites, from the predominantly General Practitioner (GP), based services at Lakeridge Health Port Perry to the very high acuity services provided at Lakeridge Health Oshawa by physician specialists and interprofessional teams.

Services provided across Lakeridge Health are organized into eight clinical programs:

- Emergency and Critical Care
- Maternal Child
- Medicine
- Addictions & Mental Health
- Post-Acute Specialty Services (PASS)
- Regional Cancer Services
- Regional Nephrology System/Durham Region Diabetes Network
- Surgery
