= Lakeridge Health Ajax and Pickering =

Hospital in Ajax, Ontario, Canada

- Lakeridge Health
- Location in southern Ontario

Geography
- Location: Ajax, Durham, Ontario, Canada
- Coordinates: 43.8369°N 79.0169°W

Organization
- Care system: Public Medicare (Canada) (OHIP)
- Type: General

Services
- Emergency department: Yes
- Beds: 144

Helipads
- Helipad: TC LID: CPE2

History
- Founded: 1954

Links
- Website: www.lakeridgehealth.on.ca
- Lists: Hospitals in Canada

Lakeridge Health Ajax and Pickering is a hospital in Ajax, Ontario, Canada that is operated by Lakeridge Health. The hospital opened in 1954 as the Ajax and Pickering General Hospital.

It was founded in 1954 as the Ajax and Pickering General Hospital with 38 patient beds. New four-storey wings were added in 1964 and 1994. A major $80 million redevelopment project was completed in 2010. Almost 25 percent of the hospital was renovated.

Management of the site was transferred from Rouge Valley Health System to Lakeridge Health effective December 1, 2016.

== Services ==
The hospital has a capacity of 144 beds, and is raising $5 million to procure a new magnetic resonance imaging (MRI) machine to support the large population growth in the area. The Emergency Department was originally designed to accommodate 20,000 visits a year, but now routinely handles 45,000. It is equipped with a helipad for medical evacuations.

In fall 2019, an additional 22-bed inpatient mental health unit was planned to open at this hospital to support mental health services.

The services offered by the Ajax Pickering Hospital are as follows: The Shoulder Centre, inpatient and outpatient surgery, women's and children's health, critical care, diagnostic imaging, outpatient mental health services, cardiac care, diabetes education and laboratory services.

== Heliport ==
The hospital is equipped with a ground level heliport located to the southwest near the wood area. Patients will need to travel by ambulance from heliport to the interior of the building to get to the emergency department.
