= Toronto Grace Health Centre =

Hospital in Toronto, Ontario, Canada

Coordinates: 43.670429°N 79.383178°W

- The Salvation Army

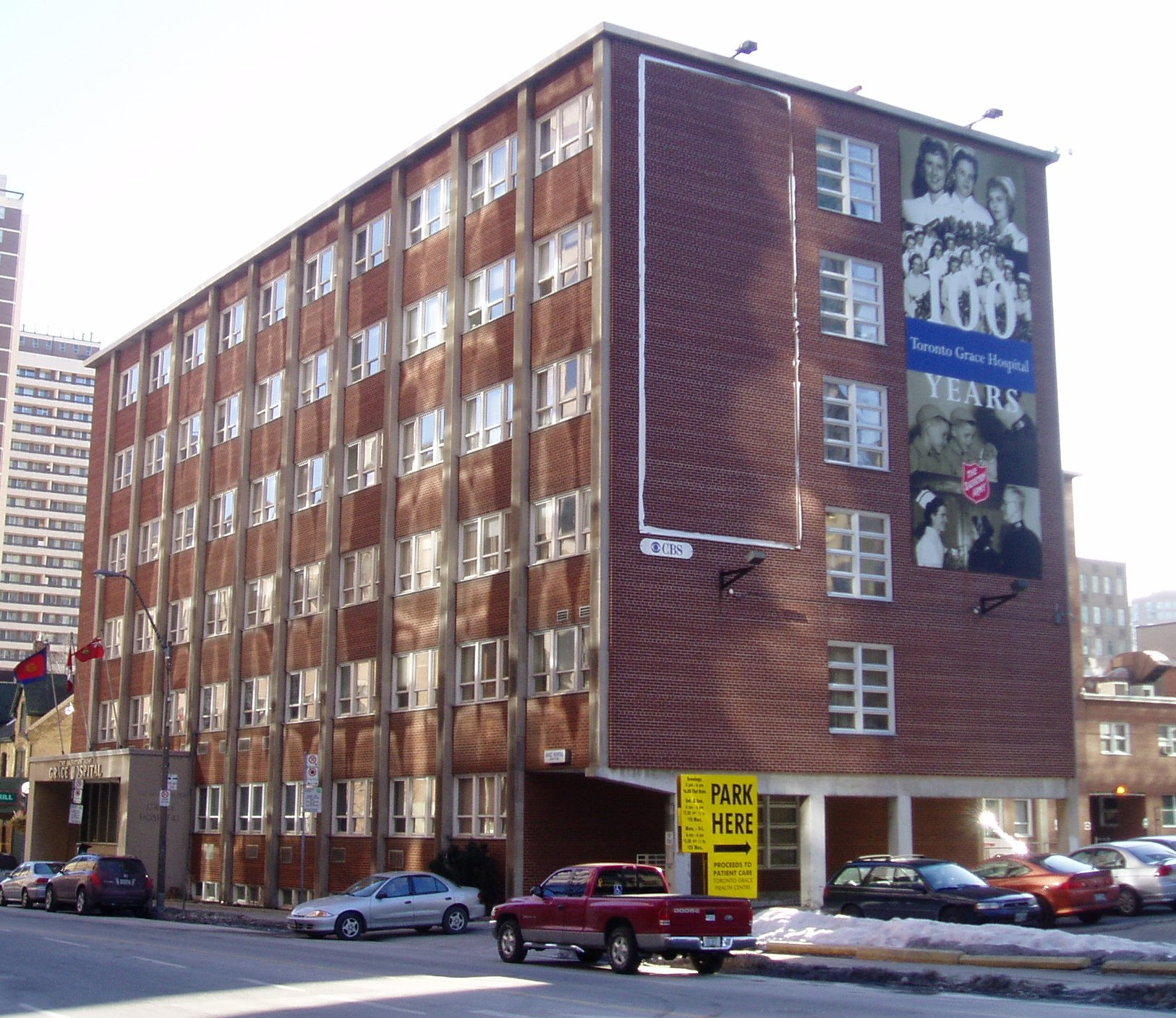

Geography
- Location: 650 Church St, Toronto, Ontario, Canada

Organization
- Care system: Public Medicare (Canada) (OHIP)
- Type: Specialist

Services
- Emergency department: No
- Beds: 272
- Speciality: Palliative care, Complex Continuing Care, Post Acute Care Rehabilitation

History
- Founded: 1905

Links
- Website: http://www.torontograce.org
- Lists: Hospitals in Canada

The Salvation Army Toronto Grace Health Centre, commonly shortened to Toronto Grace Health Centre or Toronto Grace, is a 272-bed hospital located at 650 Church Street in Toronto, Ontario. Owned and operated by the Salvation Army, it specializes in palliative care, post-acute care rehabilitation, and complex continuing care.

== Overview ==
Located on the corner of Church and Bloor Street in downtown Toronto, the six-storey facility was known as a maternity hospital up to the 1970s when the hospital closed its pregnancy ward. It is now a rehabilitation and palliative care facility.

In 2002, the hospital underwent several renovations, meant to curb energy consumption, in associated with the Energy Innovators Initiative

The Salvation Army was prepared to close the hospital starting in February 2010 due to high upkeep costs, but a deal was struck between the Province and the Salvation Army to keep the hospital open.

== History ==
- 1889 - The Salvation Army opens a rescue home in Toronto.
- 1905 - The home becomes The Salvation Army Maternity Hospital on Esther Street.
- 1909 - The hospital moves to the corner of Bloor and Church Streets.
- 1925 - An extension is added to what was then called the Toronto Women's Hospital.
- 1937 - The hospital is renamed Toronto Grace.
- 1959 - The new building is constructed at Bloor and Church Street.
- 1969 - Toronto Grace is designated a general hospital.
- 1979 - Toronto Grace is designated as a chronic care and palliative care hospital, opening the first Palliative Care Unit in Ontario.
- 1998 - The Health Services Restructuring Committee directs the Toronto Grace and three other complex continuing care hospitals to close.
- 2001 - The Ministry of Health reverses the decision and directs Toronto Grace to continue to provide its programs and services.
- 2005 - Toronto Grace Hospital celebrates its 100th birthday at Church and Bloor Streets in downtown Toronto.
- 2007 - Toronto Grace is renamed the Toronto Grace Health Centre (TGHC), and increases its focus on rehabilitation introducing slow-paced rehab programs.
- 2010 - TGHC submits its retrofit application to the Ministry of Health.
- 2014 - TGHC's programs and services are relocated to the temporary 47 Austin Terrace, Hillcrest site, as the 650 Church Street building undergoes a major building retrofit.
- 2017 - The infrastructure renewal project is completed and TGHC returns to its 650 Church Street location.

== Scarborough Grace Hospital ==
The Salvation Army opened a second hospital site in Scarborough in 1985 and ended their affiliation in 2008. The CEO is Jake Tran, who has held the office since 2018.
