= Sisterhood of St. John the Divine =

Canadian religious community of Anglican nuns

The Sisterhood of St. John the Divine is a religious community of nuns in the Anglican Church of Canada, the only Anglican religious order founded entirely within Canada.

The order was founded on 8 September 1884, the feast of the Nativity of the Blessed Virgin Mary, when Mother Hannah Grier Coome took her vows at the convent of the Community of St. Mary in Peekskill, New York, where she had undergone novitiate training. They developed ministries including a church workroom and altar bread department in Toronto; guest houses; the Church Home for the Aged (Toronto); St. John's Convalescent Hospital in Newtonbrook, Ontario; All Saints Hospital in Springhill, Nova Scotia; the Shernfold School in Ottawa; Qu'Appelle Diocesan School in Regina, Saskatchewan; St. Christopher's House (postal Sunday school); St. Michael's Mission in Montreal; St. John's House in Edmonton, Alberta; and St. John's Convent in Bracebridge, Ontario.

The sisters minister at St. John's Rehab Hospital and wear distinctive blue habits, retreat leadership, and spiritual direction services. They make altar linens to order, and founded the Altar Guild at St. Thomas Anglican Church. The Sisterhood has been active in liturgical renewal and unequivocal in its acceptance of the Book of Alternative Services.

The order's house is in Toronto (St. John's Convent and Guest House). A house in Victoria (St. John's House, BC) closed in 2020.

== Bibliography ==
- A Brief Outline of the History of the Sisterhood of Saint John the Divine 1884-1938 (1938) digitized by Richard Mammana
- A Brief History of the Sisterhood of Saint John the Divine 1884-1946 (1946)
- The Sisterhood of Saint John the Divine 1884-1984 (fourth revision)
