= Agfa impax 6 =

PACS client for Windows-based PCs

AGFA IMPAX 6
- Developer(s): AGFA
- Operating system: Microsoft Windows
- Type: Digital Healthcare Imaging
- License: Proprietary

AGFA Impax 6 is a PACS client for Windows-based PCs, written by AGFA. It is proprietary software for use at medical facilities using a digital radiology imaging system. It is the sixth release of the IMPAX client.

== Features ==
IMPAX 6 features both local and remote access. The client can connect to the PACS server from home or office locations. This is accomplished via thin and fat client technology. The latest version is Impax 6.6, which features a stethoscope login screen.
