= Lakeridge Health Whitby =

- Lakeridge Health Corporation

Geography
- Location: Whitby, Ontario, Canada
- Coordinates: 43°51′23″N 78°56′41″W

Organization
- Care system: Public (OHIP)
- Type: Specialty clinic

Services
- Emergency department: N/A
- Beds: 32

History
- Founded: 1969

Links
- Website: www.lakeridgehealth.on.ca
- Lists: Hospitals in Canada

Lakeridge Health Whitby is a clinic in Whitby, Ontario, offering specialized health services to the Durham Region.

== History ==
The clinic originally was opened as a full-service hospital for the town of Whitby on December 17, 1969, named the Dr. J.O. Ruddy General Hospital. The complex was a combined medical and psychiatric hospital, the first in North America. The hospital maintained a high ranking from the Canadian Council on Health Services Accreditation since it was first surveyed in 1971, receiving a four-year 'distinction' accreditation in 1995. The hospital was renamed Whitby General Hospital in 1987.

In 1998 the hospital, along with Memorial Hospital Bowmanville, North Durham Health Services, and Oshawa General Hospital, were placed under the administration of the Lakeridge Health Corporation, an amalgamation completed under the Common Sense Revolution of the Mike Harris administration. The government had created the Health Services Restructuring Committee and, under their recommendation, the Lakeridge Corporation was to place the town of Whitby under the service of Lakeridge Health Oshawa and would close Whitby General. However, the Ontario Ministry of Health and Long-Term Care reversed this decision in 2001 and allowed the complex to stay open, albeit not as a full-service hospital but a specialty clinic.

== Recent history ==
The clinic currently offers palliative care, dementia care and dialysis services to the Durham Region. Other services, such as the day hospital, offer rehabilitation to those who have suffered from strokes or brain injuries. A 16-bed geriatric assessment unit was opened in 1999, which was later expanded to 32 beds in 2003. This unit offers continued, low-intensity rehabilitation for elderly individuals.

A July 2, 2007 electrical fire forced the clinic to cancel over 20 surgeries and move their 71 patients to Lakeridge Oshawa. Though the clinic was scheduled to re-open in autumn of the same year, services would not resume until April 2011.

=== Proposed re-opening ===
Recent population growth in Durham has caused some to call for the re-opening of the clinic as a full service hospital, a movement garnering support from both municipal and provincial levels.

A review of the current site found that as the building was created for Whitby in the 1960s, the current patient capacity would be unable to support the town's current population. In addition, to bring the building to healthcare and building codes, the review found that extensive renovations must be made to the building structure, interior structure, mechanical systems and upper levels.

The town of Whitby has therefore proposed a new hospital in the recently developed north Whitby, to service the town and north Oshawa. As a short-term solution, a February 2006 request for $17.5 million for the current location's infrastructure was submitted by the Lakeridge Corporation to the Ministry of Health.

In November 2007, Liberal health minister George Smitherman remarked that he was not committing himself to a new hospital in Whitby. He added that Whitby should seek funds for the hospital from MP Jim Flaherty, as it under was Flaherty that the hospital closed.
