= Sunnybrook Health Sciences Centre =

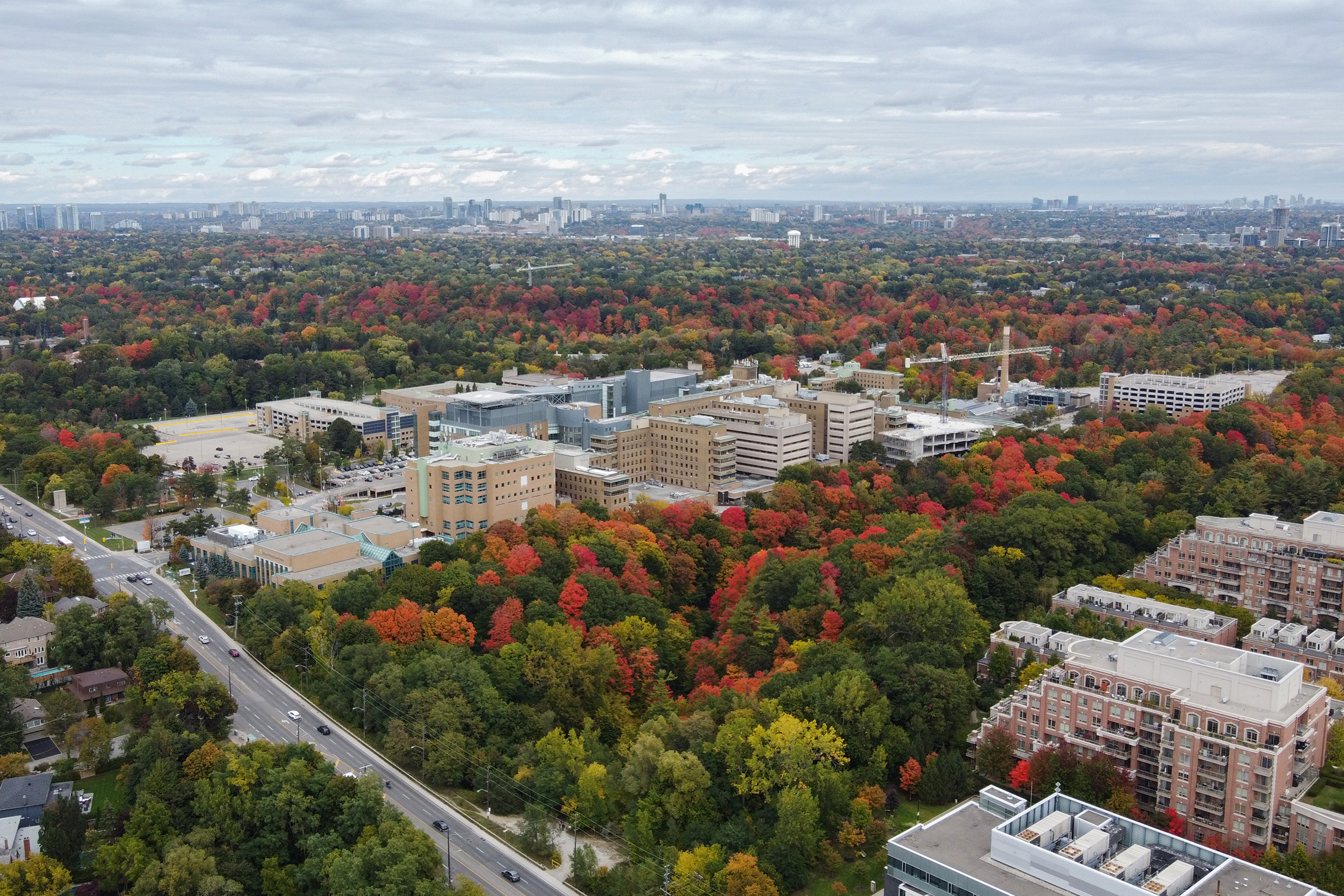
- Aerial view of the building in 2022

- Location in Toronto

Geography
- Location: Toronto, Ontario, Canada
- Coordinates: 43°43′22″N 79°22′29″W

Organization
- Care system: Public Medicare (Canada) (OHIP)
- Type: Teaching
- Affiliated university: University of Toronto
- Network: TAHSN

Services
- Emergency department: Level I trauma centre
- Beds: 1325 (including bassinet beds)
- Speciality: Cancer, heart and vascular, high risk maternal and newborn, image guided brain therapies, trauma

Helipads
- Helipad: TC LID: CNY8

History
- Former name: Sunnybrook Military Hospital
- Founded: 1948
- Closed: Centre Community Link

Links
- Website: www.sunnybrook.ca
- Lists: Hospitals in Canada

Sunnybrook Health Sciences Centre (SHSC), commonly known as Sunnybrook Hospital or simply Sunnybrook, is an academic health science centre located in Toronto, Ontario, Canada. The hospital is the largest trauma centre in Canada. It is accredited as a Level I trauma centre by the Trauma Association of Canada and the American College of Surgeons, the first hospital outside of the United States to achieve ACS accreditation. Sunnybrook is a teaching hospital fully affiliated with the University of Toronto as a member of the Toronto Academic Health Science Network (TAHSN). The hospital is home to Canada's largest veterans centre, in the Kilgour Wing and the George Hees, which cares for World War II and Korean War veterans.

Sunnybrook has made surgical breakthroughs in its history, including the world's first non-invasive opening of the blood–brain barrier being performed in 2015.

== History ==
Sunnybrook Hospital had its origins as the Toronto Military Orthopaedic Hospital at 350 Christie Street, which was also known as the Christie Street Military Hospital and, after 1936, the Christie Street Veterans' Hospital. The Collegiate Gothic building had originally been the site of the National Cash Register Company Factory in 1913 by the architects Page and Warrington, but it was converted for use as a military hospital in 1919 to house soldiers injured during World War I as well as some veterans disabled in the Boer War and the Fenian Raids. The influx of disabled soldiers returning from World War II led to overcrowding and required a new hospital. The original site was demolished in 1981 and replaced by Christie Gardens Apartments and Care Facility, at 600 Melita Crescent.

Joseph and Alice M. Kilgour, a wealthy Toronto couple, purchased 154 acres (62.3 ha) in the nearby town of Leaside and created Sunnybrook Farm, where they raised horses and hosted fox hunts. In 1928, after Joseph's death, Alice Kilgour donated Sunnybrook Farm to the City of Toronto in his memory for use as a public park.

With the consent of the Kilgour heirs, part of the parkland was transferred to the Canadian government to build a hospital for veterans to replace the Christie Street Hospital. The new building was designed by Allward and Gouinlock (Hugh Allward was the son of the sculptor Walter Seymour Allward, and George H. Gouinlock is the son of the architect George Wallace Gouinlock).

The first patient was admitted to Sunnybrook Military Hospital in September 1946. The hospital officially opened its doors in June 1948. The Christie Street hospital was converted into a senior citizens' home, Lambert Lodge.

In 1973, Sunnybrook Military Hospital became Sunnybrook Medical Centre, and in 1976, it established Canada's first regional trauma unit.

In 1991, the Province of Ontario opened major research facilities to house the rapid growth of on-campus research. The hospital merged with Women's College Hospital and the Orthopaedic and Arthritic Hospital in June 1998 under the provisions of Bill 51, but Sunnybrook and Women's College Health Sciences Centre was deamalgamated in April 2006 to create Sunnybrook Health Sciences Centre and the separate Women's College Hospital.

On July 1, 2012, Sunnybrook and St. John's Rehab Hospital, which had complementary programs and services, voluntarily merged to provide a continuum of care from acute injury or illness to rehabilitation and recovery.

As of 2016, Sunnybrook maintains three campuses, with its main campus (Bayview) on Bayview Avenue in North York, the satellite Holland Centre (orthopaedic and arthritic care) on Wellesley Street East, and St. John's Rehab on Cummer Avenue. SHSC became affiliated with the University of Toronto in 1966.

On January 25, 2020, Canada's first presumptive positive case of COVID-19 was brought into Canada by a man in his fifties who had recently travelled to Wuhan, China. The man, who called 9-1-1 soon after he had become ill with minor symptoms, was placed in isolation in Sunnybrook. On January 27, the National Microbiology Laboratory, in Winnipeg, confirmed that the man in isolation was the first confirmed case of COVID-19 in the country. By January 31, the man felt well enough to return home.

== Areas of focus ==
=== Veterans Program ===
Sunnybrook has the largest veterans care facility in Canada. It is partnered with Veterans Affairs Canada, and provides long-term and complex hospital care to about 500 World War II and Korean War veterans. Staff provide three categories of care to veterans: physical support, cognitive support and palliative care. The Veterans Centre is located in the Kilgour and George Hees wings of the hospital.

Research is conducted through the Veterans & Community research program through Sunnybrook Research Institute.

=== Hurvitz Brain Sciences Program ===
The program provides care to people with brain-related disorders and conditions. The program's main areas of focus include stroke, dementias and mood and anxiety disorders.

Brain sciences research is also conducted through the Hurvitz Brain Sciences research program through Sunnybrook Research Institute.

=== Holland Musculoskeletal Program ===
The program focuses on musculoskeletal injury, total joint replacement and major biological restoration. Areas of expertise include traumatic injury management; joint reconstruction and replacement; rehabilitation; rheumatology; sports injury management; and complex upper and lower limb surgery.

Musculoskeletal research is also conducted through the Holland musculoskeletal research program through Sunnybrook Research Institute.

=== DAN Women and Babies Program ===
The program provides pre-conception, pregnancy, birth and post-birth care to pregnant women, including those with high-risk pregnancies. It also provides gynecological care to patients. The program also has a neonatal intensive-care unit (NICU). The NICU is a high-risk regional neonatal nursery, and one of three serving the Central East Region of Ontario. They care for infants requiring Level III or Level II neonatal care. In 2017, the program opened North America's first pregnancy clinic for women with physical mobility disabilities.

Research in obstetrics, neonatology, obstetrical anaesthesia and women's reproductive health is also conducted through the Women & Babies research program through Sunnybrook Research Institute.

=== Schulich Heart Program ===
The program is named for Seymour Schulich a Canadian businessman and philanthropist from Montreal. The centre, as per the name, is a cardiac care centre providing treatment, prevention and care of heart diseases. The centre performs heart surgeries, tests and procedures, including various minimally invasive heart procedures.

Research is also conducted through the Schulich heart research program through Sunnybrook Research Institute.

=== Odette Cancer Program ===
The Odette Cancer Program provides care to patients with various types and stages of cancer. The centre also has a focus on cancer prevention, detection and patient education. Various clinical trials are also run out of the centre.

Research is conducted through the Odette Cancer Centre research program through Sunnybrook Research Institute. Research spans from the topics of basic genetics, biochemistry and biology of cancer.

=== Tory Trauma Program ===
The program provides critical care and trauma care to patients. The emergency department is open 24 hours a day. The trauma centre is the largest in Canada, and the only accredited Level 1 trauma centre outside of the US. It is one of two trauma centres in Toronto, the other being St. Michael's Hospital. The trauma program also works in conjunction with the Ross Tilley Burn Centre.

Research is also conducted through the Tory Trauma research program through Sunnybrook Research Institute.

=== St. John's Rehab ===
St. John's Rehab Program provides specialized rehabilitation, education and support for people recovering from complex, life-changing illnesses and injuries, including: amputations, cancer, cardiovascular surgery, organ transplants, orthopaedic conditions, stroke and neurological conditions, traumatic injuries and complex medical procedures and conditions. It is home to Canada's only organ transplant rehabilitation program and Ontario's only burn rehabilitation program.

Rehabilitation research is also conducted through the St. John's Rehab research program through Sunnybrook Research Institute.

=== Integrated Community Program ===
The Integrated Community Program was established to ensure that the transition from hospital to the next step is one where everyone involved is both informed and engaged. This program also includes Sunnybrook's emergency care.

== Heliport ==
A helicopter pad (TC LID: CNY8) is located at the east end of the hospital grounds, as well as on the rooftop of the building's M-wing. Sunnybrook handles air ambulance flights with urgent trauma cases from the Greater Toronto Area if an ambulance run is not possible. Only two other hospitals in the City of Toronto proper have helipads: St. Michael's Hospital and the Hospital for Sick Children. Sunnybrook has been equipped with a helipad since 1977.

The new M-wing helipad became fully operational in January 2020. The platform's dimensions, measuring 75 ft by 75 ft, make it Canada's second-largest helipad.

== Former private clinic ==
Sunnybrook Hospital was from 2001 to 2003 the site of Ontario's first private for-profit cancer clinic to be created since the inception of Medicare. The clinic operated after the hospital's regular working hours and was owned by Tom McGowan. An investigation by the Auditor General of Ontario revealed that the clinic's cost per procedure was $500 greater than the public sector's and that waiting times did not decrease in the public system after the clinic's had opened.

== Holland Centre ==
The Holland Centre consists of the Orthopaedic Program located in Downtown Toronto, on 43 Wellesley Street East.

The Holland Orthopaedic and Arthritic Centre was initially founded as the Orthopaedic and Arthritic Hospital by James E. Bateman and Charles S. Wright II in 1955, based on a charter procured by C. Stewart Wright, an orthopaedic surgeon. It merged with Sunnybrook Health Sciences Centre in 1998.

The Holland Centre was named as a centre of excellence in joint replacement.
