= Birchmount Hospital =

Hospital in Toronto, Ontario, Canada

Coordinates: 43°48′06″N 79°18′32″W

- Scarborough Health Network
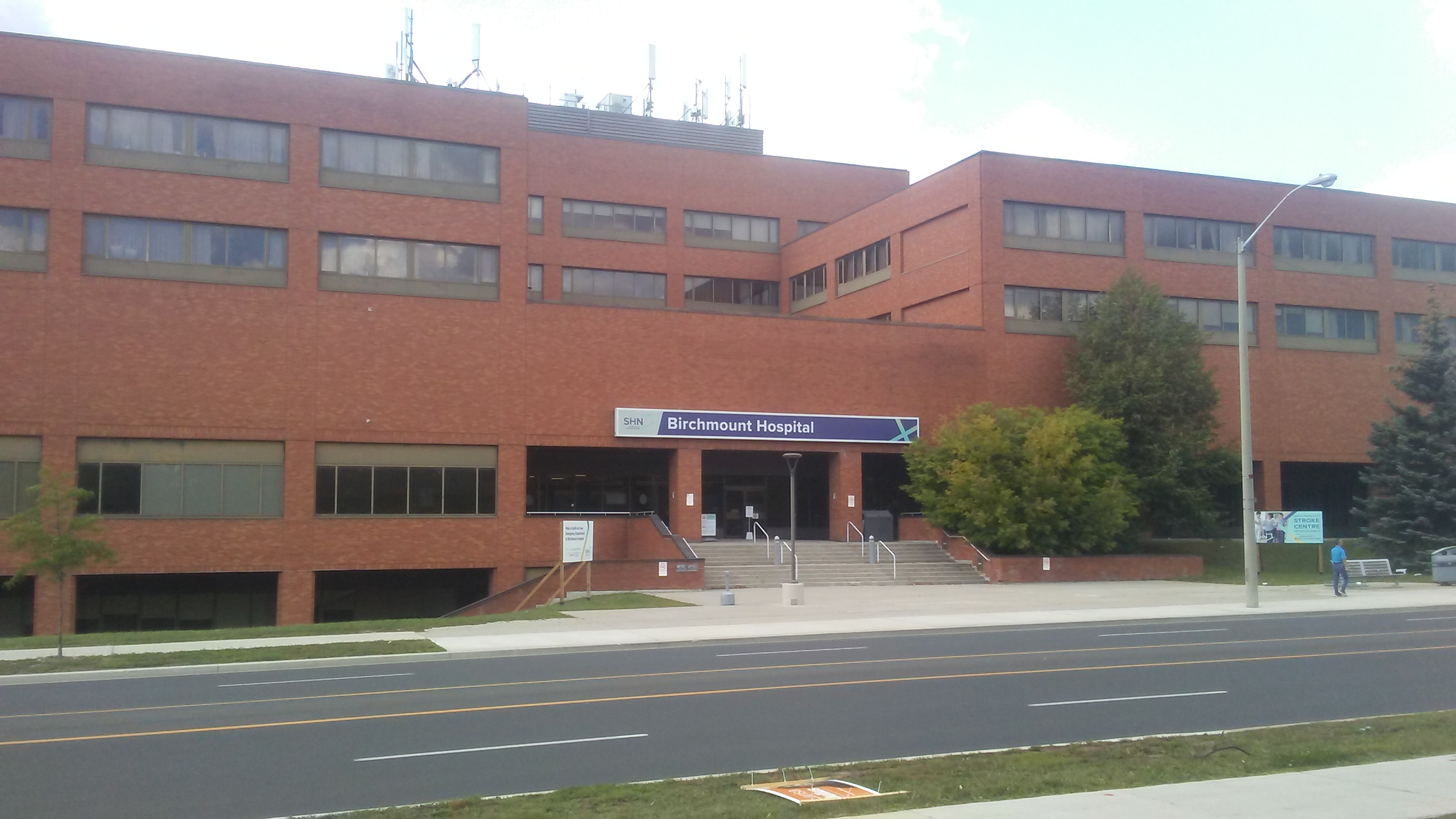

Geography
- Location: 3030 Birchmount Road, Toronto, Ontario, Canada

Organization
- Care system: Public Medicare (Canada)
- Type: Community
- Affiliated university: University of Toronto

Services
- Emergency department: Yes

History
- Former name: Scarborough Grace Hospital
- Founded: 1984; 42 years ago

Links
- Website: https://www.shn.ca
- Lists: Hospitals in Canada

Birchmount Hospital, formerly Scarborough Grace Hospital, is a hospital in Toronto, Ontario, Canada. Located in the Agincourt neighbourhood along Birchmount Road, the hospital was opened in 1984 by The Salvation Army. As of 2016, it is part of the Scarborough Health Network.

== History ==
In 1984, The Salvation Army opened the hospital as The Salvation Army Scarborough Grace Hospital, simply known as the Scarborough Grace Hospital. In 1998, The Salvation Army also assumed administrative duties of the Scarborough General Hospital and formed the subsidiary hospital network, The Scarborough Hospital. The official name for the hospital was The Scarborough Hospital, Grace Division.

The Scarborough Grace Hospital gained international attention when it became the centre of the severe acute respiratory syndrome (SARS) outbreak in Toronto after Tse Chi Kwai was admitted in March 2003. As Justice Archie Campbell wrote in his SARS Commission report, in March 2003 the index patient for the SARS epidemic in Canada "waited in the crowded emergency ward [of Scarborough Grace] for over 16 hours. During these hours he transmitted SARS to two other patients, sparking a chain of infection that spread through the [hospital], then to other hospitals through patient transfers and ultimately killed 44 and sickened more than 330 others."

The Scarborough Hospital became independent from The Salvation Army in October 2008 when it decided to cease its role in the administration of the hospital and refocus its efforts on providing spiritual care that is culturally sensitive. As part of the agreement with The Salvation Army, The Scarborough Hospital undertook a process to remove Grace from the name, opening a contest to staff and the public to rename the hospital. The new name, Birchmount, named after the street it is located on, was announced in July 2009. Although locals continued to refer to the hospital as Grace, the hospital was officially named The Scarborough Hospital, Birchmount Division.

On December 21, 2010, the Birchmount campus was approved for a magnetic resonance imaging machine by Gerry Phillips, Member of Provincial Parliament for Scarborough-Agincourt.

On December 1, 2016, the campuses of The Scarborough Hospital (General and Birchmount) and the Centenary Hospital merged to form a new administrative network, the Scarborough Health Network.

On January 24, 2019, the Scarborough Health Network approved the closure of pediatric and obstetric services at the Birchmount Hospital. As of 2019, the hospital network plans to reduce the number of hospital sites from three to two by 2031. A local campaign known as Save the Grace, headed by Toronto city councillor Jim Karygiannis, appeals to the Government of Ontario to stop plans of shutting down the hospital.

== See also ==
- List of hospitals in Toronto
