= Scarborough Health Network =

Hospital network in Toronto, Ontario, Canada

Geography
- Location: Scarborough, Toronto, Ontario, Canada
- Coordinates: 43°45′21″N 79°14′49″W

Organization
- Care system: Public Medicare (Canada) (OHIP)
- Type: Large Community Teaching
- Affiliated university: University of Toronto
- Network: TAHSN

Services
- Emergency department: Yes

History
- Founded: 1998; 2016 (current form)

Links
- Website: www.shn.ca
- Lists: Hospitals in Canada

Scarborough Health Network (SHN) is a hospital network in Scarborough, Toronto, Ontario, Canada. It operates the Scarborough General, Centenary, and Birchmount hospitals. The three sites function as major community teaching hospitals, involved in medical education and research as an associate member of the Toronto Academic Health Science Network (TAHSN) affiliated with the University of Toronto. It is the teaching hospital partner of the Scarborough Academy of Medicine and Integrated Health (SAMIH) of the University of Toronto Faculty of Medicine.

== History ==
=== Early years ===
Pre-merger logo as The Scarborough Hospital.

Scarborough’s first general hospital opened at Lawrence Avenue East and McCowan Road in 1956, established by local physicians and the Sisters of Misericorde to meet the needs of a fast-growing suburb. A second general hospital, later known as Centenary, opened on 1 July 1967, its name marking the 100th anniversary of Canadian Confederation. In 1984 The Salvation Army opened Scarborough Grace Hospital in north Scarborough, later renamed Birchmount Hospital. Irene Stickland, a Salvation Army officer, served as CEO of Scarborough Grace from 1989 to 1999.

=== 1990s amalgamations ===
In 1998 the Salvation Army merged administration of Scarborough General and Scarborough Grace as The Scarborough Hospital, creating a two-campus organization. In the same year Centenary joined the Ajax and Pickering hospital to form the Rouge Valley Health System (RVHS), where Centenary became the Scarborough campus of that system.

=== 2016 realignment and renaming ===
In 2016 the province directed the dissolution of RVHS and the transfer of the Centenary campus to The Scarborough Hospital, while the Ajax and Pickering campus moved to Lakeridge Health. The new three-site corporation took effect on 1 December 2016 with the interim name Scarborough and Rouge Hospital, and in 2018 it adopted the name Scarborough Health Network.

=== Program consolidation and local response ===
On 24 January 2019 the SHN board approved integration of the Women’s and Children’s program at the Centenary and General hospitals, which shifted inpatient obstetrics and inpatient pediatrics away from Birchmount. SHN stated that Birchmount would remain open and continue to provide acute care. The decision drew a local campaign, Save the Grace, advocating for services in north Scarborough. Jim Karygiannis, a Toronto city councillor, was among the public advocates for maintaining services at Birchmount.

=== Redevelopment ===
In 2023 the province supported SHN’s redevelopment program in Scarborough, including a major expansion plan at Birchmount. SHN describes the Birchmount project as the largest redevelopment in its history, with a new tower, expanded emergency department, additional operating rooms, inpatient beds, and diagnostic imaging.

=== SARS ===
In 2003 the first patient with SARS in Toronto was treated at the Scarborough Grace Hospital, now Birchmount. SARS in Canada reported 44 deaths in Ontario and more than 330 people infected.

== Philanthropy ==
In January 2022 the Scarborough Health Network Foundation launched Love, Scarborough, a CA$100 million advertising and fundraising campaign that highlighted disparities in donations and infrastructure affecting Scarborough hospitals. The second phase of the campaign strived to raise money for the new education and research mandates of the network, including a new academic tower located at the Centenary Hospital site.

== Hospitals ==
- Scarborough General Hospital, opened 1956
- Centenary Hospital, opened 1967
- Birchmount Hospital, opened 1984; formerly Scarborough Grace Hospital. Former CEO was Irene Stickland.

== Governance and leadership ==
SHN is governed by a volunteer board of directors. As of 2025 the network’s President and CEO is David Graham, appointed in 2022.

== Affiliations and programs ==
SHN cites affiliations with the University of Toronto and partnership with the Scarborough Academy of Medicine and Integrated Health. The network reports regional programs at its sites, including cardiac and spine surgery services at Centenary, as well as surgical, mental health and outpatient services across the network.

== See also ==
- List of hospitals in Toronto
