= St. John's Rehab Hospital =

Coordinates: 43.7876°N 79.4043°W

St. John's Rehab

Geography
- Location: Toronto, Ontario, Canada

Organization
- Care system: Public Medicare (Canada)
- Type: Rehabilitation
- Affiliated university: Temerty Faculty of Medicine (University of Toronto)

Services
- Emergency department: No
- Beds: 160

History
- Founded: 1937

Links
- Website: www.sunnybrook.ca/stjohnsrehab
- Lists: Hospitals in Canada

St. John's Rehab, part of Sunnybrook Health Sciences Centre, is solely dedicated to specialized rehabilitation. As the site of Canada's only dedicated organ transplant rehabilitation program and Ontario's only dedicated burn rehabilitation program, the hospital develops individually customized inpatient and outpatient rehabilitation services.

This 160-bed hospital in North York is fully affiliated with the University of Toronto and is a teaching site that receives students from many post-secondary institutions. Research is conducted in its specialty programs in partnership with other health care and provincial agencies.

The hospital was accredited by Accreditation Canada in 2009.

== Patient care ==
St. John's Rehab provides specialized treatment, education and outreach support for people recovering from:

- Amputations
- Burn injuries
- Cancer
- Cardiovascular surgery
- Organ transplants
- Orthopaedic conditions
- Strokes and neurological conditions
- Traumatic injuries and complex medical conditions/procedures

Referrals are required for admission to St. John's Rehab programs with the exception of community wellness clinics, which are open to the public. These fee-for-service clinics specialize in orthopaedic conditions, acupuncture, chiropody, chiropractic, massage therapy, and arthritis aquatic treatment. While some services are funded by the Ontario Health Insurance Plan (OHIP), others are funded by insurers, such as motor vehicle insurance or the Workplace Safety and Insurance Board (WSIB).

St. John's Rehab incorporates the holistic approach of healing the mind, body and soul—a technique pioneered by the Sisterhood of St. John the Divine.

== History ==
Officially opening in 1937, St. John's Rehab's origins date back to the 1884 founding of the Sisterhood of St. John the Divine, Canada's only indigenous Anglican women's religious order. During the Riel Rebellion in Saskatchewan in 1885, the Sisters were called upon to manage a hospital being organized in Moose Jaw to care for those wounded in battle.

In 1933, the Sisterhood – who were historically active in health care – responded to the community's need and directed their efforts to a new area: convalescent care. They organized a Board of Trustees under the direction of The Honourable Vincent Massey to finance and plan the construction of St. John's Rehab Hospital (then a convalescent hospital). On May 22, 1937, the hospital opened its doors as the first Toronto-area facility to offer rehabilitative care.

By 1941, the need for recovery care had grown exponentially, to the point where St. John's Rehab began contemplating expanding beyond its 64 beds. In 1948, the hospital was already a regional provider, caring for 716 patients annually from present-day Toronto, York Region and throughout Ontario.

Following the Second World War in the 1940s, St. John's Rehab offered respite care for recovering Canadian soldiers. This tradition continues today, as the hospital cares for soldiers wounded in the current mission in Afghanistan.

Today, St. John's Rehab has 160 beds and cares for about 2,500 inpatients annually, as well as a comprehensive outpatient program that sees more than 50,000 visits per year.

== Research and education ==
St. John's Rehab trains clinical and administrative health professionals from across Canada. It offers supervised placements and learning opportunities in professions including physiotherapy, occupational therapy, physiatry, nursing, social work, psychology, massage therapy, chiropractic, chiropody, quality and risk management, corporate communications, hospital administration and human resources.

As a fully affiliated hospital of the University of Toronto, clinicians teach students from the Department of Rehabilitation Science. St. John's Rehab hosts students from institutions such as York University, Toronto Metropolitan University, McMaster University, Humber College, Seneca College, Centennial College, George Brown College, University of New Brunswick, The Michener Institute of Applied Health Sciences, Elmcrest College and the Canadian Memorial Chiropractic College.

== Redevelopment ==
The hospital's latest redevelopment included a brand new facility: the John C. and Sally Horsfall Eaton Centre for Ambulatory Care. This 49,000-square-foot (4,600 m^{2}) addition brings together all of the hospital's outpatient services for the first time, including telerehab consultations for patients from across Ontario, a new therapy pool, and a face-mask and splinting clinic for burn and sports injuries. Floor-to-ceiling windows provide a backdrop to the facility's 25 acres (10 ha) of landscaped grounds. St. John's Rehab Foundation has completed the $15-million Rebuilding Lives fundraising campaign to support the redevelopment project, as well as fund treatment equipment, clinical education and rehabilitation research.

== See also ==
- Sisterhood of St. John the Divine
- List of hospitals in Toronto
