= Canadian Hearing Society =

Organization

Canadian Hearing Services was founded in 1940 to provide services for deaf and hard of hearing people in Ontario. Services include instruction in American and Quebec sign languages, interpreter services, deafblind intervenors, audiology and speech–language pathology. The CHS (Canadian Hearing Services) advocates for the hearing impaired in Canada through the support of 9-1-1 texting, visual fire alarms, and access to the justice system. The CHS handles emergency situations in hospitals, emergency rooms, after-hours clinics, shelters, and police services.

== Services ==
=== Ontario interpreting services ===
Ontario Interpreting Services (OIS) provides interpreting services across Ontario for American and Quebec sign language in some regions. They cover a range of public and personal events.

=== Workplace accessibility ===
The workplace accessibility program assesses the workplace to ensure that there are no barriers for the deaf and hard of hearing. It provides seminars to "increase awareness of hearing loss in the workplace". Business staff and management are educated to raise awareness of hearing loss and provide strategies for communication, which includes holding accessible meetings.

=== Communication devices program ===
The Communication Devices Program (CDP) was made on behalf of members who were "culturally deaf, orally deaf, deafened or hard of hearing". The main aim is to offer technical solutions to communication barriers. The CDP recommends devices (such as specialized alarm clocks, telephones, TTYs, and smoke alarms) for the home, workplace or business.

=== Video conferencing services ===
The CHS provides video conferencing services (VCS) in 25 offices across Ontario. VCS allows for conferencing with up to 12 locations and can be used for many different purposes such as interviews, meetings or training sessions.

=== Audiology ===
The CHS Audiology service is available in Hamilton, Mississauga, Toronto, Kenora, Sarnia, Windsor, Ottawa, Sudbury and Toronto East. The audiology program takes a holistic approach to hearing health care by looking at hearing loss and the ways in which it affects life. Audiologists provide hearing tests, hearing aid evaluations, hearing aid check-ups and fine tuning, and hearing aid fitting and dispensing for children and adults.

=== Hearing care counselling program ===
The Hearing Care Counselling Program operates in 26 Ontario sites. It aids seniors with hearing loss in adjusting and maintaining connections. While the priority is adults 55 and up, younger adults can also join. Counsellors offer home visits, training, device demos, and suggestions.

=== CONNECT counselling program ===
The CONNECT Counselling Program is available in 26 locations across Ontario. CONNECT is a mental health counseling service provided by the CHS. CONNECT is a program designed to help individuals or families with deaf, deafened or hard of hearing members by providing them with counseling for a variety of reasons, including "mental health and illness, depression, relationship difficulties, abuse, family support, education, advocacy and counselling".

=== American Sign Language classes ===
The CHS offers classes in American Sign Language.

== Locations ==
There are 22 Canadian Hearing Services locations across Ontario:

- Barrie
- Belleville
- Brantford
- Cornwall
- Durham
- Hamilton
- Kingston
- London
- Mississauga
- North Bay
- Ottawa
- Peterborough
- Sarnia
- Sault Ste Marie
- Scarborough, Toronto
- Sudbury
- Thunder Bay
- Timmins
- Toronto
- Waterloo
- Windsor
- York Region
