= Community of St. Mary =

Anglican women's religious order

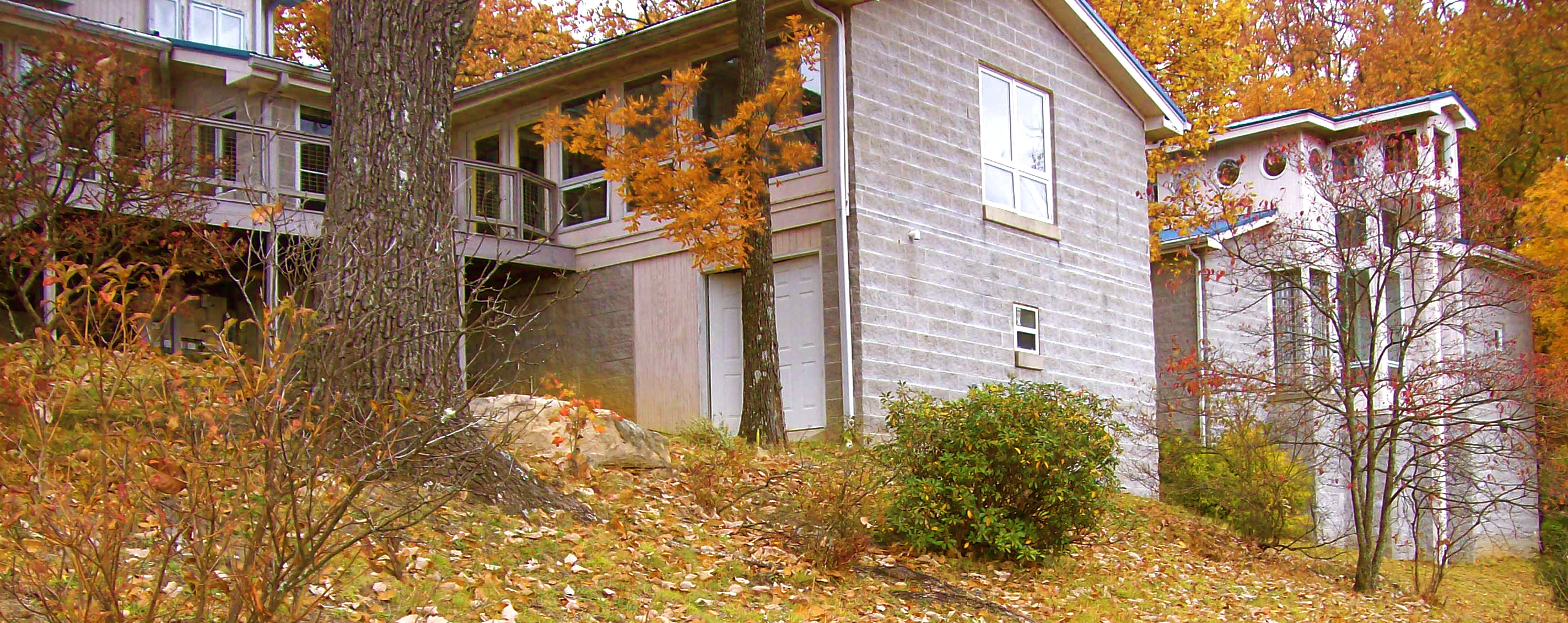
St. Mary's Convent, Sewanee, Tennessee

The Community of St. Mary (CSM) is an Anglican religious order of nuns with independent houses located in Shepherdstown, West Virginia, Sewanee, Tennessee, and also in Malawi and the Philippines.

== History ==
The oldest indigenous Anglican (Episcopalian) order in the United States, it was founded in New York City in 1865 by Harriet Starr Cannon and a small group of fellow nuns. It was formally constituted by Bishop Horatio Potter of New York as the Sisters of St. Mary. The Episcopal Church was initially slow to recognize the order, and they only found wide support after four of the sisters died nursing victims of a yellow fever epidemic in Memphis, Tennessee in 1878. These four sisters are now commemorated by the Episcopal Church on September 9 as the Martyrs of Memphis or as Constance and her Companions. The community now consists of two independent provinces: Eastern and Southern. In April of 2021, the Eastern province left the Episcopal Church (TEC) and joined the Anglican Church of North America's Diocese of the Living Word.

== Rule of life ==
Their rule of life is very similar to the Benedictine rule, and they live a mixed life of prayer and service. The sisters in the Eastern Province pray the Divine Office five times each day, and the community's Monastic Diurnal Revised is a popular prayer book for many outside of the community as well. From their foundation in 1865 the first sisters took charge of the "House of Mercy" in New York. Then and now the sisters have felt called to the care of "the lost, forgotten, and underprivileged" after the example of many Christian saints, including St Vincent de Paul.

== Provinces ==
=== Eastern ===
The Eastern Province sisters moved in 2003 from Peekskill, New York to Greenwich, New York, where they owned a 175-acre (0.71 km^{2}) facility adjoining the Spiritual Life Center of the Episcopal Diocese of Albany. The sisters engaged in various activities, which include participating at the healing center of the Spiritual Life Center, giving retreats, working with a local Boy Scout troop, and speaking at various churches. They also raised cashmere goats and run a 4-H program for local youth. They continued to wear the traditional habit.

In 2021, the Eastern Province of the Community of St. Mary left the Episcopal Church and joined the ACNA, while its other provinces remained in the Episcopal Church. After a time under the oversight of the Anglican Diocese of the Living Word, in 2025 the three remaining sisters decided to sell the convent and accepted an invitation from Bishop Darryl Fitzwater of the Diocese of All Saints to relocate near the diocesan cathedral in Charles Town, West Virginia. The sisters moved to nearby Shepherdstown in the spring of 2026, with their presence intended to be part of a planned diocesan conference center and shrine to Our Lady of Walsingham.

=== Southern ===
The Southern Province sisters trace their descent from the remnants of the Memphis sisters. Their current chapel houses the altar, aumbry, and chalice that were originally located in the Memphis house. The sisters formerly operated a girls' school in Sewanee—St. Mary's Preparatory School for Girls—which closed at the end of the 1967-1968 school year. The school is now a retreat center for individual and group retreats, in addition to hosting presentations on contemplative prayer. The convent and the retreat center are located near the campus of the Sewanee: The University of the South. The sisters say the office from the 1979 Book of Common Prayer, in addition to a daily mass, every day except Monday, which is the sisters' Sabbath.

=== Western ===
The Western Province sisters pursued individual ministries, but were especially involved in offering retreats and spiritual direction at Mary's Margin in Mukwonago, Wisconsin. The last remaining sister of the community died in 2023.

== Overseas houses ==
=== Malawi ===
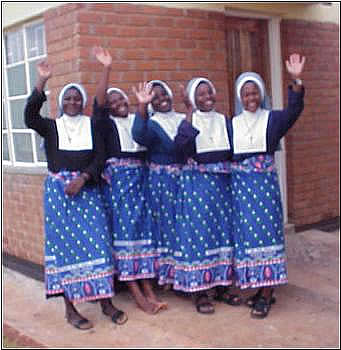
Five of the sisters in Malawi.

A branch house of the Eastern Province of the Order was established in Malawi in 2002. The initial group of Malawian sisters completed their novitiate at the Eastern Province Peekskill house, but novices are now trained in Malawi. They are hoping to establish a crisis nursery for babies whose parents are unable to care for them because of AIDS. They also give presentations in churches, visit the sick, lead Bible studies, preach, and work on their farm, helping other women to learn sustainable agriculture techniques.

=== Philippines ===
The sisters also have a mission in the Philippines, which has been in existence for over thirty years, and forms part of the Southern Province.

St Mary's Convent is located in the predominantly Anglican town of Sagada, Mountain Province. It is attached to the Church of Saint Mary the Virgin, which belongs to the Episcopal Church in the Philippines.
