= Toronto Academic Health Science Network =

Canadian health science research consortium

- Headquarters: 777 Bay Street, Suite 22002; Toronto, Ontario, Canada
- Location: Greater Toronto Area
- Fields: Health science
- Members: 15 (incl. University of Toronto; 2026)
- Chair: Sarah Downey (President & CEO of CAMH)
- Website: tahsn.ca

The Toronto Academic Health Science Network (TAHSN) is a consortium of health science organizations affiliated with the University of Toronto. Aside from the university, it comprises 14 research institutes and teaching hospitals with significant emphasis on tertiary care, including medical treatment, research and advisory services to patients and clients from Canada and abroad.

Ten TAHSN hospitals ranked in the 2025 list of Canada’s Top 40 Research Hospitals published by Research Infosource Inc. Its hospitals represent 40 per cent of total research spending among the top 40 research hospitals in Canada, with about $1.5 billion in combined spending.

The TAHSN is associated with two level 1 adult trauma centres, a multi-organ transplant hospital, a pediatric hospital, a psychiatric hospital, a geriatric hospital, four rehabilitation institutes and several general hospitals. The University of Toronto's Temerty Faculty of Medicine also houses Biosafety level 3 facilities.

== Member organizations ==
The fifteen organizations comprising the Toronto Academic Health Science Network are as follows.

Full members

- Baycrest Health Sciences
- Centre for Addiction and Mental Health
- Holland Bloorview Kids Rehabilitation Hospital
- The Hospital for Sick Children
- Sinai Health System
- Sunnybrook Health Sciences Centre
- St. Michael's Hospital (Unity Health Toronto)
- University Health Network
- University of Toronto
- Women's College Hospital

Associate members

- Hennick Humber Hospital
- Michael Garron Hospital
- North York General Hospital
- Scarborough Health Network
- St. Joseph's Health Centre (Unity Health Toronto)
- Trillium Health Partners

=== Member profiles ===
A laboratory at The Centre for Applied Genomics of the Hospital for Sick Children

Institution	Main specialty	Affiliated research arm
Princess Margaret Cancer Centre (University Health Network)	Medical Oncology, Radiation Oncology, Surgical Oncology	Ontario Cancer Institute
Toronto General Hospital (University Health Network)	Cardiology, Multi-Organ Transplant, Cardiac Surgery, Thoracic Surgery	Toronto General Research Institute
Toronto Western Hospital (University Health Network)	Neurology, Neurosurgery, Ophthalmology, Rheumatology	Krembil Research Institute
Holland Bloorview Kids Rehab	Paediatric rehabilitation	Bloorview Research Institute
Centre for Addiction and Mental Health	Psychiatry, Addiction Medicine	
Mount Sinai Hospital (Sinai Health System)	Multispecialty: Inflammatory bowel disease, High Risk Pregnancy, Orthopedic Oncology	Samuel Lunenfeld Research Institute
Hospital for Sick Children	Paediatrics, Paediatric Surgical Specialities	SickKids Research Institute
St. Michael's Hospital (Unity Health Toronto)	Trauma Surgery, Inner City Health, Gastroenterology	Li Ka Shing Knowledge Institute
Sunnybrook Health Sciences Centre	Multispecialty: Oncology, Trauma Surgery, Burn Injuries	Sunnybrook Research Institute
Toronto Rehabilitation Institute (University Health Network)	Physiatry	
Baycrest Centre for Geriatric Care	Geriatrics, Neurophysiology	Research Centre for Aging and the Brain
Women's College Hospital	Obstetrics and Gynecology, Women's Health, Dermatology	Women's College Research Institute

- University Health Network consists of three specialized hospitals: Toronto General Hospital for cardiology and organ transplants; Princess Margaret Cancer Centre for oncology as the home of the Ontario Cancer Institute; and Toronto Western Hospital for neuroscience and musculoskeletal health.
- Unity Health Toronto consists of St Michael's Hospital, an adult hospital and trauma centre, Providence Healthcare, a rehabilitation institute and St. Joseph's Health Centre, a community teaching hospital.
- Sinai Health System consists of Mount Sinai Hospital, a general hospital and Bridgepoint Active Healthcare, a rehabilitation institute.
- Trillium Health Partners consists of Mississauga Hospital, a general hospital, Credit Valley Hospital, community teaching hospital,
- Sunnybrook Health Sciences Centre is an adult hospital with regional cancer and trauma centres.
- Women's College Hospital is an ambulatory hospital focused on women's health.
- The Hospital for Sick Children is the pediatric medical centre specializing in treatments for childhood diseases and injuries.
