= Sinai Health System =

Geography
- Location: Toronto, Ontario, Canada

Organization
- Care system: Public Medicare (Canada) (OHIP)
- Type: General
- Affiliated university: University of Toronto
- Network: TAHSN

Services
- Emergency department: Yes (Mount Sinai Hospital only)

History
- Founded: January 22, 2015

Links
- Website: https://www.sinaihealth.ca/
- Lists: Hospitals in Canada

The Sinai Health System (corporately styled as Sinai Health) is a hospital system which serves Toronto, Ontario, Canada. It comprises two hospitals, Mount Sinai Hospital (an acute care hospital) and Hennick Bridgepoint Hospital (a rehabilitation hospital), both affiliated with the University of Toronto as a member of the Toronto Academic Health Science Network (TAHSN).

In the 2019–2020 fiscal year, there were nearly 29,000 inpatient stays and 59,700 emergency department visits for Mount Sinai Hospital. The average length of stay for inpatients was 4.4 days.

In October 2026, Dr. Lynn Mikula was succeeded Dr. Gary Newton as president and CEO of Sinai Health.

== Formation ==
The hospital system was formed through the voluntary amalgamation of Mount Sinai Hospital (including the Lunenfeld-Tanenbaum Research Institute) and Hennick Bridgepoint Hospital on January 22, 2015.

== Constituent hospitals ==
=== Mount Sinai Hospital ===
Mount Sinai Hospital (founded 1923 as The Hebrew Maternity and Convalescent Hospital) is a 442-bed general hospital located along the "Hospital Row" portion of University Avenue in downtown Toronto. It is connected via tunnels and bridges to three adjacent hospitals of the University Health Network: Toronto General Hospital, Toronto Rehabilitation Institute, and Princess Margaret Cancer Centre.

==== Lunenfeld-Tanenbaum Research Institute ====
The Lunenfeld-Tanenbaum Research Institute (founded 1985 as the Samuel Lunenfeld Research Institute) is the medical research institute of Mount Sinai Hospital. Its researchers conduct studies into various diseases including cancers, neurological disorders, and diabetes.

=== Hennick Bridgepoint Hospital ===
Hennick Bridgepoint Hospital (founded 1875 as Riverdale Isolation Hospital) is a 464-bed rehabilitation hospital located in the Riverdale neighbourhood of Toronto. It operates programs for patients with complex chronic ailments or those requiring physical rehabilitation.

== Programs ==
Sinai Health and University Health Network jointly run the Sinai Health-UHN Antimicrobial Stewardship Program, advocating for improved patient access to appropriate antibiotics while combating antimicrobial resistance. The program is led by infectious diseases specialist Andrew Morris, who joined as founding Director at its inception in 2009.
