= Patricia O'Campo =

Canadian public health researcher

- Education: PhD, Johns Hopkins University; BSc, University of California, Berkeley
- Scientific career
- Workplaces: St. Michael's Hospital (Unity Health); University of Toronto

Patricia O'Campo is a scientist and professor within the Dalla Lana School of Public Health at the University of Toronto in Canada. She currently holds the Tier 1 Canada Research Chair in Population Health Intervention, St. Michael's Hospital Chair in Intersectoral Solutions for Urban Health Problems, and a position as the executive director of the Li Ka Shing Knowledge Institute. Her work as a social epidemiologist explores the social determinants of health and health inequities impacting urban populations and vulnerable populations (particularly women and children), homelessness, mental health, and intimate-partner violence. She is also a scientist within the MAP Centre for Urban Health Solutions. In terms of teaching, her primary focus lies under population health intervention research at the University of Toronto.

== Education ==
O'Campo had first obtained a Bachelor of Science (B.Sc.) degree in Conservation and Resource Studies within the University of California, Berkeley. This degree was obtained with honours. She then eventually went on to complete her Ph.D. in Epidemiology at the Johns Hopkins University School of Public Health in 1989.

== Career ==
Her career began with training in epidemiology involving clinical care and outcomes affecting common health conditions such as cardiovascular health, and epidemics. This later branched into her current focus in social epidemiology. Her first paper was one of the first to explore the social determinants of health in urban areas, which looked at the impact living in cities have on health.

She began her position as a full professor in the Johns Hopkins Bloomberg School of Public Health within the Department of Population, Family, and Reproductive Health in January of 1991 up until June 2004.

In 2018, O'Campo was named a fellow of the Royal Society of Canada, a prestigious title awarded to recognize distinguished Canadian scientists, scholars, and artists. And a year after, in April, she became the Tier 1 Canada Research Chair in Population Health Intervention Research.

O'Campo had also served as the Board Chair of the United Way Greater Toronto's (UWGT) Board of Trustees prior to 2023 and is a co-chair of the Indigenous Partnership Council.

== Awards and accomplishments ==
- Top 10 Articles of the Year 2020-22 by the CIHR Institute of Health Services and Policy Research (CIHR-IHSPR) and Canadian Association for Health Services and Policy Research (CAHSPR) for her article published in April 2020
- Royal Society of Canada fellow in September 2018
- Social Responsibility Award from St. Michael's Hospital in September 2014
- Canadian Academy of Health Sciences Fellow in June 2013
- Greg Alexander award for advancing knowledge in 2008 provided by the Coalition for excellence in Maternal and Child Health (MCH) Epidemiology which involves the American Academy of Pediatrics, Centers for Disease Control and Prevention (CDC), and National Institutes of Health (NIH) amongst 13 other organizations
- Lorretta Lacey Award by the Association of the Teachers of Maternal and Child Health in February 2002
