= NYGH =

NYGH may refer to:

- Nanyang Girls' High School in Singapore
- North York General Hospital in Canada
