= Barbara E. Gibson =

Canadian Physiotherapist

Academic background
- Education: B.Sc. Rehabilitation Science in Physical Therapy, 1986, University of Manitoba; PhD, Collaborative Programs in Bioethics and Health Care Technology and Place, 2006, University of Toronto Faculty of Medicine
- Thesis: Men with Duchenne muscular dystrophy: a Bourdieusian interpretation of identity and social positioning. (2006)

Barbara Ellen Gibson is a Canadian physiotherapist. In 2016, she was elected to the College of New Scholars, Artists, and Scientists of the Royal Society of Canada.

== Early life and education ==
Gibson received her Bachelor of Medical Rehabilitation in Physical Therapy from the University of Manitoba in 1986 and her PhD in the Collaborative Programs in Bioethics and Health Care Technology and Place at the University of Toronto Faculty of Medicine (U of T).

== Career ==
Following her formal education, Gibson joined the Department of Physical Therapy at U of T. In this role, she received a three-year Canadian Institutes of Health Research Operating Grant in 2012 for her project The Challenge Module for evaluating advanced motor skills of children with cerebral palsy: From measurement to child centred goal setting. She was later awarded a 2012 Faculty of Medicine Teaching Award for Excellence. As an associate professor in the Department of Physical Therapy and Senior Scientist at the Holland Bloorview Kids Rehabilitation Hospital, Gibson was appointed to the Bloorview Kids Foundation Chair in Childhood Disability Studies.

In 2016, Gibson published Rehabilitation: A Post Critical Approach to re-examine the philosophical foundations of rehabilitation. Later that year, she was elected to the College of New Scholars, Artists, and Scientists of the Royal Society of Canada. Following her election, Gibson was promoted to the rank of Full Professor.
