= LifeBook Memoirs =

British autobiography company

LifeBook Memoirs Ltd
- Founded: 2011
- Founder: Roy Moëd & Yvette Conn
- Headquarters: Godalming, Surrey
- Key people: Roy Moëd, Yvette Conn
- Services: Private memoirs and autobiographies
- Website: www.lifebookmemoirs.com

Since 2012, LifeBook Memoirs Ltd has been the world's leading private memoir specialists

LifeBook Memoirs Ltd is a privately held British company headquartered in Godalming, Surrey, England. It specialises in the creation of bespoke, privately commissioned autobiographies and memoirs. Founded in 2011 by entrepreneur Roy Moëd, the company emerged from a personal endeavour to document the life stories of Moëd's father. LifeBook Memoirs has since grown into a global enterprise that operates in more than 40 countries. The company contracts a variable number of interviewers and ghostwriters and maintains a permanent staff comprising project management, editorial, typesetting, sales and finance teams. To date, it has completed more than 1500 LifeBooks, with families owning more than 20,000, and established itself as a leader in the private autobiography sector.

== History ==
British serial entrepreneur Roy Moëd founded the company in 2011 following the sale of his airline-catering business, Pourshins Ltd, in 2007. The idea for LifeBook Memoirs stemmed from Moëd's experience with his elderly father, Jules, for whom he arranged regular interviews to record his life story. According to Moëd, the process revealed previously unknown family stories and offered insight into his father's reflections on the life he had led. This experience inspired the creation of LifeBook Memoirs.

Moëd and his co-founder, Yvette Conn, launched the company's first projects in 2011 under the name LifeBook. They developed a process in which clients are paired with local interviewers for in-person sessions while professional ghostwriters, selected based on shared interests and backgrounds but located globally, craft the written narratives.

A US subsidiary, Private Autobiography Services, trading as LifeTime Memoirs, was established in 2016 to serve the growing market in North America. In 2022, Roy Moëd and Yvette Conn took control of the two companies from their investor backers and merged them to form LifeBook Memoirs.

== Key people ==
Roy Moëd has served as the CEO of LifeBook Memoirs Ltd since founding the company in 2011. Previously, in 1978, he founded Pourshins Ltd, a supplier of airline-catering services, and he remained its chairman until 2013. Moëd stated that he has been an active member of the Young Presidents' Organization (YPO) since 1991. From 2012 to 2013, he served as the organisation's director.

Yvette Conn is the co-founder and operations director of LifeBook Memoirs. Her responsibilities have included overseeing interviewer training, managing team development and supporting the company's fundraising initiatives. Company literature also highlights her involvement with OPUS Bespoke, a subdivision dedicated to corporate histories. Prior to co-founding LifeBook Memoirs, Conn worked as a corporate broker in the City of London.

== Operations ==
=== LifeBook Memoirs ===
The LifeBook Memoirs production process comprises multiple stages, including interviewing, ghostwriting, editing and book production. Each client is paired with a project manager who appoints a local interviewer, typically located within proximity of the client, to conduct 12 or more 90-minute in-person sessions to record the client's life stories. These recordings are transcribed and then crafted into a third-person narrative by a professional ghostwriter selected for compatibility with the client's background and interests. Clients regularly review draft manuscripts and make revisions in line with their preferences, working in consultation with their interviewer and project manager.

The production team also includes editors, typesetters and proofreaders who oversee the refinement, design and layout of the final work. Completed manuscripts are printed on archival-quality paper and bound by hand in the United Kingdom.

In addition to their completed books, authors receive a USB stick containing audio highlights from their book, read aloud in their own voice along with a digital copy of their manuscript and all accompanying photos and documents.

=== OPUS ===
In addition to private memoirs and autobiographies, LifeBook Memoirs has expanded into documenting corporate histories through its OPUS Bespoke division, which focuses on businesses and their founders, as well as tribute and celebration books.

== Awards and recognition ==
In 2024, LifeBook Memoirs Ltd reported that it was named one of the top 100 workplaces in The Sunday Times Best Places to Work awards.

== Partnerships, public engagement and charity support ==
During the company's initial development, founder Roy Moëd collaborated with Baycrest, a Canadian research and teaching hospital, and its affiliate Cogniciti, a brain health company. Both organisations reported that the interview process had a positive effect on elderly patients' cognitive abilities and memory.

In 2012, LifeBook Memoirs Ltd launched a fundraising initiative in support of Jewish Care, a health and social care charity serving the Jewish community in London and the southeast.
