= Sharon Straus =

Canadian scientist and physician

Sharon Straus CM FRCPC
- Education: University of Toronto; University of Western Ontario; University of Oxford
- Known for: mentorship in the field of epidemiology; knowledge translation
- Scientific career
- Fields: Geriatrics; Knowledge Translation
- Workplaces: University of Toronto; Unity Health Toronto

Sharon Elizabeth Straus is a Canadian professor of geriatric medicine at the University of Toronto, and a geriatrician at Unity Health Toronto. Straus was appointed as a member of the Order of Canada in 2021.

== Early life and education ==
Straus completed her medical degree and Master of Science degree from the University of Toronto (U of T) and a research fellowship at the Centre for Evidence-Based Medicine at the University of Oxford.

== Career ==
In 2005, Straus was the recipient of a Tier 2 Canada Research Chair in Knowledge Translation. While serving in this role, she also served as the director of the knowledge translation program at St. Michael's Hospital's Li Ka Shing Knowledge Institute. In 2013, Straus was appointed a fellow of the Canadian Academy of Health Sciences. During the COVID-19 pandemic, Straus worked with the COVID-19 Immunity Task Force and oversaw a study of people in 72 long-term care facilities in the Greater Toronto Area and the Ottawa-Champlain region. In 2021, Straus was elected a Fellow of the Royal Society of Canada and received the University of Toronto Faculty of Medicine's Lifetime Achievement International/Global Impact Award.

== Research ==
Straus has authored over 400 publications primarily in the areas of evidence-based medicine, knowledge translation and mentorship. She was awarded a Tier 1 Canada Research Chair in Knowledge Translation and Quality of Care. She was elected to the Canadian Academy of Health Sciences and the College of New Scholars, Royal Society of Canada in 2021. She is the co-author of 4 textbooks including, "Evidence-based Medicine: How to practice and teach it" and "Knowledge Translation in Health Care".
