= St. Joseph's Health Centre =

Coordinates: 43.639957°N 79.450271°W

- Unity Health Toronto

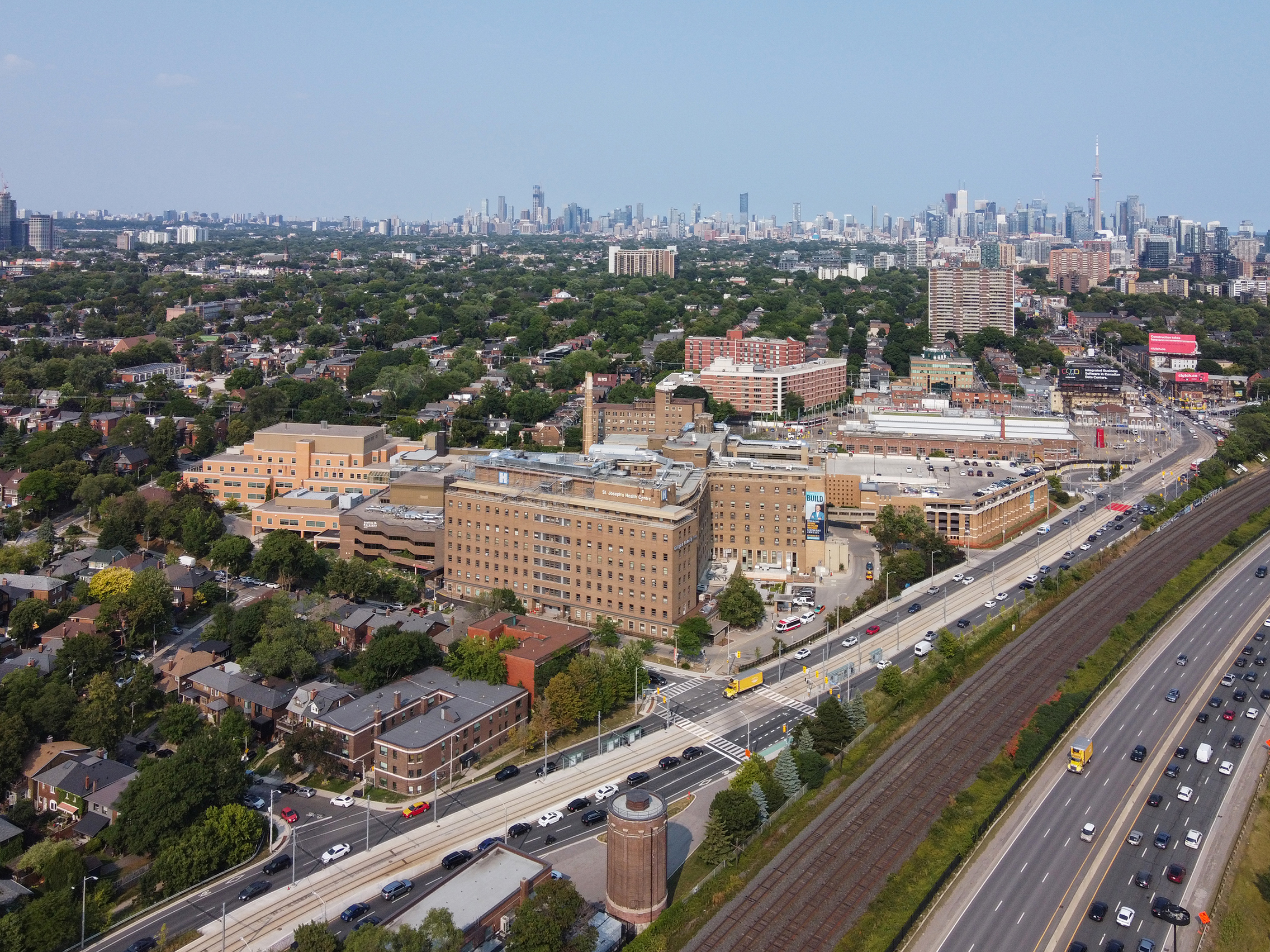
- As seen in 2025

Geography
- Location: Toronto, Ontario, Canada

Organisation
- Care system: Medicare
- Type: Community
- Affiliated university: University of Toronto
- Network: TAHSN

Services
- Emergency department: Yes
- Beds: 426

History
- Founded: 1921

Links
- Website: www.stjoestoronto.ca

St. Joseph's Health Centre is a large teaching hospital in western Toronto, Ontario. It is located west of downtown Toronto, along the Lake Ontario shore at the intersection of The Queensway and Sunnyside Avenue, just west of Roncesvalles Avenue. It was founded in 1921 by the Sisters of St. Joseph order on the site of an orphanage. The same order also founded St. Michael's Hospital in Toronto in 1892.

== Overview ==
St. Joseph's Health Centre receives more than 97,000 emergency room visits every year, and sees more than 272,000 visits in its outpatient ambulatory care clinics. More than 21,000 patients are admitted to a hospital bed every year, with an average stay of five to six days and an occupancy rate of 100%. Yearly, more than 3,000 children are born at St. Joseph's. Over 160,000 diagnostic imaging procedures are done every year and more than 30,000 surgeries.

St. Joseph's is affiliated with the University of Toronto as an associate member of the Toronto Academic Health Science Network (TAHSN) and accepts placement trainees in various specialties. Trainees are placed through U of T, and include students of other university medical programs. Over 800 trainees are placed at St. Joseph's and 200 faculty members at U of T. The medical education program is administered by the Department of Medical Education & Scholarship. St. Joseph's also accepts nursing trainees from universities and colleges.

== Services ==
- Birthing Centre & Neonatal Intensive Care Unit
- Diagnostic Imaging Services
- Emergency, Critical Care & Access Clinics
- Laboratory Services
- Medicine, Ambulatory & Seniors' Health Clinics
- Mental Health & Addictions Clinics
- Surgery & Oncology Clinics
- Pharmacy
- Women's, Children's & Family Health

The Women's, Children's and Family Health Program launched the St. Joseph's Urban Family Health Team (UFHT) at 27 Roncesvalles Ave. The main focus of UFHT is to improve population health by focusing on chronic disease prevention and management. It offers patient education, health promotion, disease prevention and chronic disease management programs.

The Emergency Clinic is located on the west side of the hospital, on Glendale Avenue. It is a streamed clinic, with adults streamed into one clinic, and children into another. St. Joseph's wait times are regularly monitored by the Ontario Ministry of Health. In 2012, St. Joseph's Health Centre had one of the lowest wait times in Ontario to see a doctor. The Ambulatory Clinic is a day-time clinic for non-emergency visits for patients needing immediate medical attention. The Ambulatory Clinic is also located in the Glendale wing.

== History ==
The original site at Sunnyside Avenue, and The Queensway, was the site of the 1800s Sunnyside Villa and farm, a home of John George Howard, surveyor of Toronto. The Sacred Heart Orphanage was built on the site, operated by the Sisters of St. Joseph order. In 1921, the City of Toronto was considering expropriating the orphanage for a public high school. The order decided to convert part of the orphanage into a hospital to prevent expropriation, and St. Joseph's was founded.

In 1939, the Sisters of St. Joseph moved its Mercy Hospital for Incurables long-term care hospital to a new facility north of St. Joseph's Hospital proper. Known as Our Lady of Mercy Hospital, it operated independently until 1980, when it was merged with St. Joseph's Hospital. The Our Lady of Mercy Wing, as it was known, was demolished in 2007. In 2012, the replacement Our Lady of Mercy Wing opened. It is a 130,000 square feet (12,000 m^{2}) four-storey building housing a Neonatal Intensive Care Unit, a Paediatric Unit, Child and Adolescent Mental Health Services, an expanded Family Birthing Centre, and three new inpatient areas housing a total of 92 beds.

On 1 August 2017, St. Joseph's Health Centre merged with St. Michael's Hospital and Providence Healthcare to form a new hospital network called Unity Health Toronto.

=== Notable dates ===
- 1921 - St. Joseph's Hospital was founded in 1921 on the site of the Sacred Heart Orphanage. Renovations were undertaken and by 1925 St. Joseph's had become a modern 112-bed facility.
- 1925 - Mercy Hospital for Incurables opens on Sackville Street in downtown Toronto.
- 1931 - East Wing was built in 1931, raising bed capacity to 300. The addition gave the hospital modern emergency facilities and included operating rooms and obstetrical facilities.
- 1935 - Sunnyside Wing West constructed to accommodate nursing students.
- 1939/40 - Mercy Hospital opens in new facility as Our Lady of Mercy Hospital, north of St. Joseph's on Sunnyside Avenue.
- 1949 - Frederick Morrow Wing opens, increasing bed capacity up to 600 and supplying much needed administrative space.
- 1960 - Glendale Wing opens, increasing the bed capacity only slightly, but providing much needed administrative and service areas and several new departments.
- 1962 - First Intensive Care Unit in Toronto opens.
- 1980 - St. Joseph's Hospital and Our Lady of Mercy Hospital merged into a single organization in 1980, becoming St. Joseph's Health Centre.
- 1989 - Justina M. Barnicke Wing opens to connect the two facilities.
- 1995 - First lung reduction surgery performed by a Health Centre team
- 1999 - Ontario Ministry of Health approved funding for a multi-year St. Joseph's Health Centre redevelopment and renewal project.
- 2005 - Vera and Ferdinand Melnyk Pavilion at the Main Entrance of the Health Centre opens
- 2006 - Glendale House opens
- 2007 - Our Lady of Mercy building demolished as redevelopment project begins to make way for a new patient care wing
- 2009 - New underground parking garage with 300 spaces opens
- 2012 - New four-storey Our Lady of Mercy Patient Care Wing opened.
- 2017 - Merged to form Unity Health Toronto, a new health network.
