= University Health Network =

Geography
- Location: Toronto, Ontario, Canada

Organization
- Care system: Medicare
- Type: Teaching, research
- Affiliated university: University of Toronto
- Network: TAHSN

Services
- Standards: Tertiary care
- Beds: 1286

History
- Founded: 1986

Links
- Website: www.uhn.ca

University Health Network (UHN) is a public research and teaching hospital network in Toronto, Ontario, Canada. It is fully affiliated with the University of Toronto as a member of the Toronto Academic Health Science Network (TAHSN), and is the largest singular health research organization in Canada, ranking first in the country for total research funding.

The network includes Toronto General Hospital, Toronto Western Hospital, Princess Margaret Cancer Centre, West Park Healthcare Centre, the Toronto Rehabilitation Institute, and The Michener Institute, a post-secondary institution granting diplomas and certificates in health sciences and leadership. In the 2019-2020 fiscal year, there were more than 39,000 acute inpatient stays and close to 121,000 emergency department visits across the three acute care hospitals.

Newsweek has consistently named UHN's Toronto General Hospital as among the world's top hospitals, most recently ranking Toronto General as the world's 2nd best hospital in 2026, and first in Canada. The hospital was named Canada's top research hospital by Research Infosource from 2015 to 2022.

== History ==
A series of mergers over many years has resulted in the UHN in its current form. In 1986, the Toronto Western Hospital and the Toronto General Hospital merged to form the Toronto Hospital. In 1998, the Princess Margaret Cancer Centre joined, with the resulting institution named the University Health Network in 1999. The Toronto Rehabilitation Institute joined in 2011, facilitating rehabilitation services for patients as they transitioned out of acute care. All four hospitals are affiliated with the Temerty Faculty of Medicine at the University of Toronto and serve as teaching hospitals for resident physicians, nurses, and other healthcare professions. 2016 saw the integration of The Michener Institute into the UHN. The Michener Institute for Education was originally established in 1958 and is the first non-medical unit to join the UHN. On 1 April 2024, West Park Healthcare Centre joined the UHN.

== Programs ==
UHN and Sinai Health System jointly run the SHS-UHN Antimicrobial Stewardship Program, advocating for improved patient access to appropriate antibiotics while combating antimicrobial resistance. The program is led by infectious diseases specialist Andrew Morris, who joined as founding director at its inception in 2009.

During the COVID-19 pandemic, UHN received a $323,981 grant from the Public Health Agency of Canada's Immunization Partnership Fund to increase COVID-19 vaccine uptake among personal support workers and their patients.
