= Michael Garron Hospital =

Hospital in Toronto, Ontario, Canada

- Toronto East Health Network

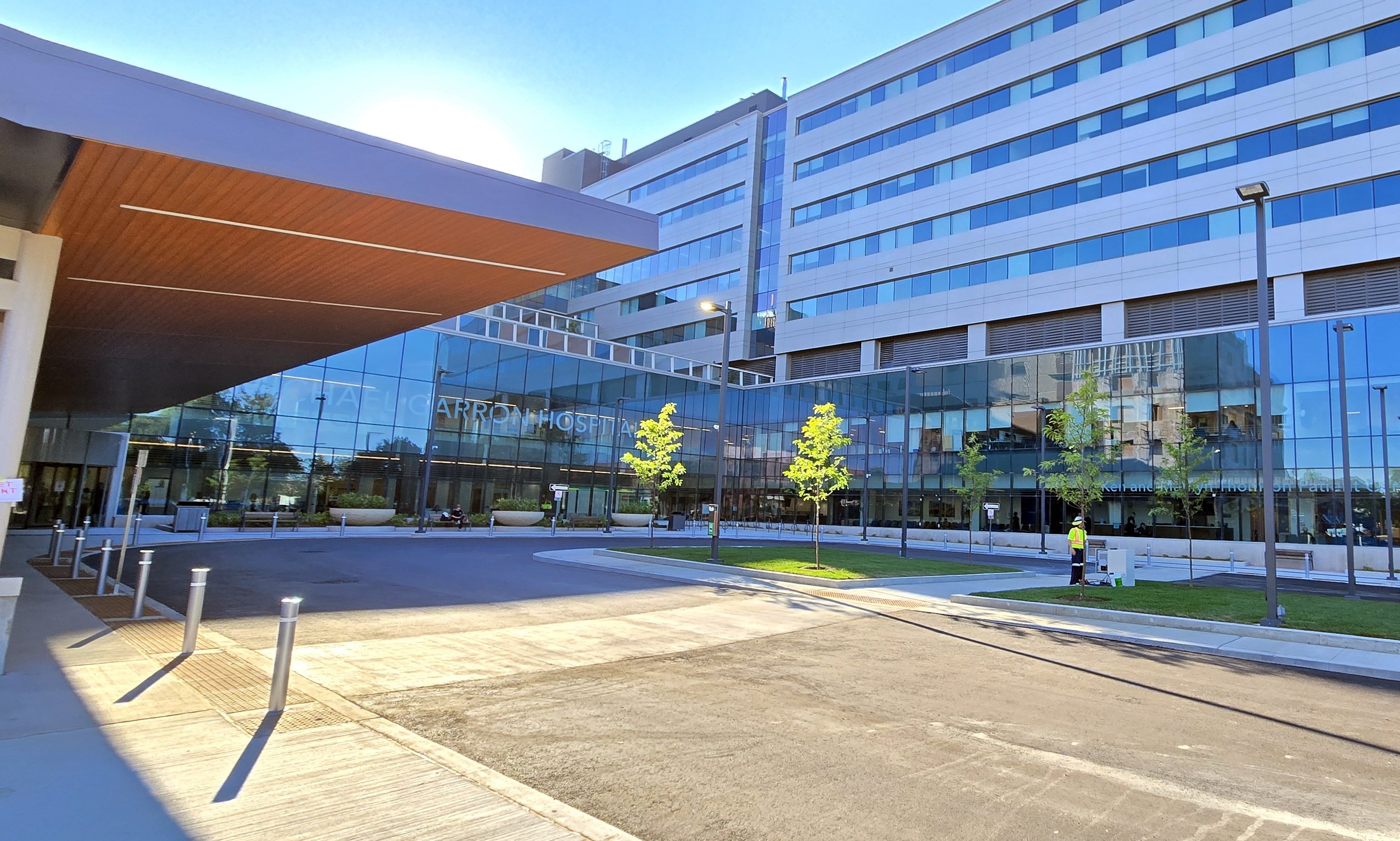

Geography
- Location: 825 Coxwell Avenue; Toronto, Ontario; M4C 3E7
- Coordinates: 43.6898°N 79.3257°W

Organisation
- Care system: Medicare
- Type: Community teaching hospital
- Affiliated university: University of Toronto
- Network: TAHSN

Services
- Emergency department: Yes (acute, subacute and ambulatory)
- Beds: 515

History
- Former name: Toronto East General Hospital
- Founded: 1929

Links
- Website: www.tehn.ca

Michael Garron Hospital (MGH), formerly Toronto East General Hospital (TEGH), is a community teaching hospital located at 825 Coxwell Avenue in East York, a district of Toronto, Ontario, Canada.

== Overview ==
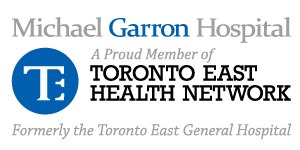
Former logo

During the 2019-2020 fiscal year, the Michael Garron Hospital had nearly 20,000 acute inpatient stays and more than 80,000 emergency visits, 265,000 outpatient visits, and 2,900 baby deliveries. MGH has a total of 388 beds, nearly 2,600 employees, and 470 physicians and midwives on staff. The total operating budget in 2019-2020 was CA$283 million. The hospital provides an extensive range of ambulatory (outpatient), inpatient, and community-based programs and services.

Accreditation Canada awarded the hospital "Full Accreditation with no recommendations" immediately after its June 2009 survey. Those results placed MGH in the top five percent of hospitals in Canada.

As a community teaching hospital, MGH is affiliated with the Temerty Faculty of Medicine and Bloomberg Faculty of Nursing at the University of Toronto as an associate member of the Toronto Academic Health Science Network (TAHSN), and other educational institutions.

MGH is a designated Pediatric Centre in south-east Toronto for maternal, newborn and pediatric care; it is also a partner hospital in the Child Health Network of the Greater Toronto area. MGH's Emergency Pediatric area has been formally affiliated with Toronto's Hospital for Sick Children since 2004. The child-centric emergency room (ER) opened in 2010 to provide a quiet area, separated from the rest of the ER, with private, glass-doored treatment rooms offering toys and televisions. The staff in this area are all specially trained in pediatrics. This type of ER is almost unique in Toronto (along with The Hospital for Sick Children). The new facility is partially funded by public sources.

Approximately 3,500 babies are delivered annually at the hospital's Maternal Newborn and Child Health Centre; it provides Level II Maternity and Neonatal Care, and it is a regional pediatric centre of the Child Health Network of Toronto.

== History ==
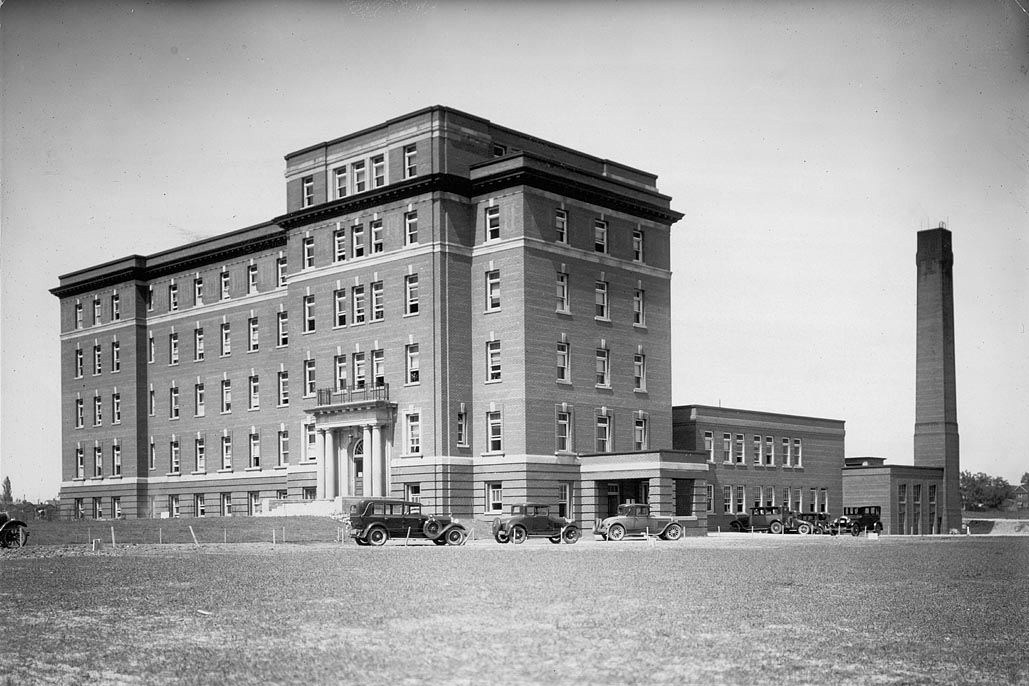
Toronto East General Hospital, 1928

The land that would become Michael Garron Hospital was sold by Billy McKay to the City of Toronto at a price of $8,000 an acre. The Town of East York (at that point, an independent municipality) allowed Toronto to annex these lands in support of the hospital, effectively making it a Torontonian exclave. Michael Garron Hospital ultimately began operations in 1929 as Toronto East General Hospital, opening with 110 beds. After this date, a new wing was built approximately once per decade.

Phase I of a 50-year redevelopment project was implemented in April 2007, when Ontario's Ministry of Health and Long-Term Care approved an investment of CA$6.7 million. This project included expansion and renovation of the Emergency Department, in addition to the Hematology and Oncology Clinic. The new Oncology Clinic opened in September 2008 (on the second floor of the K zone), and the ER opened in 2010.

On December 2, 2015, the main campus of the hospital was renamed from Toronto East General Hospital to Toronto East Health Network (Michael Garron Hospital), after a CA$50 million donation from Myron and Berna Garron.

A CA$500 million redevelopment project began in 2018, which included construction of the Ken and Marilyn Thomson Patient Care Centre, an eight-storey addition partially funded by a CA$5 million gift from Ken and Marilyn Thomson's son Peter Thomson. Also included was the demolition of several outdated wings, and construction of a four storey underground parking garage.

In 2015, Canadian industrialist Myron Garron donated CA$50M to the hospital; it was subsequently renamed in his honor of Garron's son Michael, who had died of cancer in 1975, aged 13, and who had expressed to his parents the fear that he would forgotten.

== Administration ==
The hospital's chief of staff is Sheila Laredo; its president and CEO is Melanie Kohn.

== Services ==
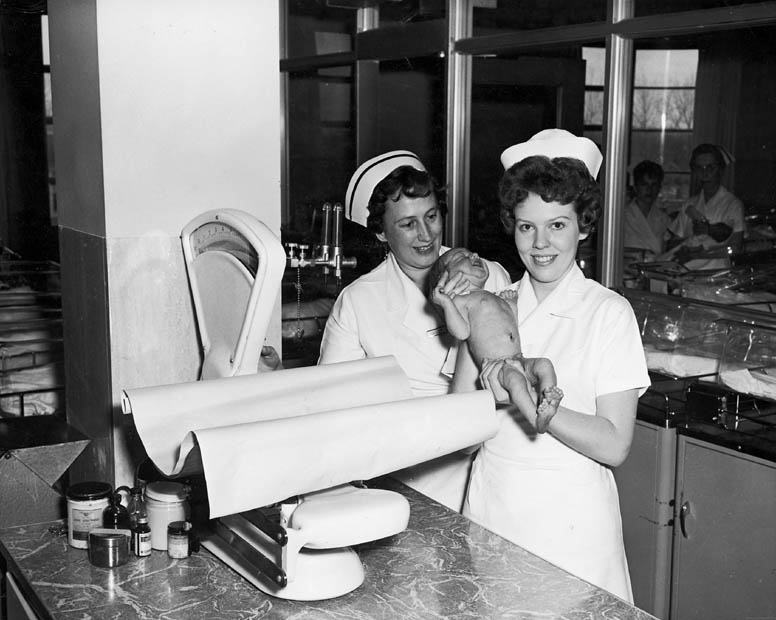
Two nurses at Michael Garron Hospital (then known as Toronto East General Hospital) in the 1950s

- Ambulatory and Community Services
- Complex Continuing Care and Short-Term Rehabilitation
- Emergency
- Maternal/Newborn/Child
- Medicine
- Mental Health
- Pharmacy
- Surgery
- Diagnostic Imaging
  - Computed Tomography
  - Magnetic Resonance Imaging
  - Ultrasound
  - Radiography
  - Nuclear Medicine
  - Mammography
- Laboratory Medicine
- Indigenous sweat lodge.

== See also ==
- Joseph Henry Harris
