= Unity Health Toronto =

Geography
- Location: 30 Bond Street; Toronto, Ontario, Canada; M5B 1W8

Organisation
- Care system: OHIP
- Type: Teaching, research
- Religious affiliation: Catholic
- Affiliated university: University of Toronto
- Network: TAHSN

Services
- Emergency department: Level I Trauma Centre (St. Michael's Hospital)

History
- Founded: 2017

Links
- Website: www.unityhealth.to

Unity Health Toronto is a Catholic hospital network serving Toronto, Ontario, Canada. It was initially founded in 2017 under the provisional name Our Shared Purpose through the merger of St. Michael's Hospital, Providence Healthcare and St. Joseph's Health Centre. It is the largest Catholic health care network in Canada. All three facilities in the network are members of the Catholic Health Sponsors of Ontario and the CHSO is responsible for ensuring consistency with the founding principles of the Sisters of St. Joseph. Tim Rutledge is the CEO.

In the 2019-2020 fiscal year, there were nearly 46,000 inpatient stays across the 3 constituent hospitals and over 173,000 emergency department visits. The average length of inpatient stays was 6.3 days.

== Constituent hospitals ==
=== Providence Healthcare ===
Providence Healthcare (founded 1857 as the House of Providence) is a 245-bed rehabilitation hospital located in the Scarborough district of Toronto. It also provides long-term care and palliative care for the elderly.

=== St. Joseph's Health Centre ===
St. Joseph's Health Centre (founded 1921) is a 376-bed general hospital in western Toronto. It is an associate member of the Toronto Academic Health Science Network (TAHSN) affiliated with the University of Toronto.

=== St. Michael's Hospital ===
St. Michael's Hospital (founded 1892) is a 463-bed teaching hospital in the Garden District of downtown Toronto that is a full member of the TAHSN affiliated with the University of Toronto. It is one of two level 1 adult trauma centres in the Greater Toronto Area, and is equipped with a helipad for air ambulance services.

== Links ==
- Official website
- Toronto Academic Health Science Network
