= Hennick Humber Hospital =

Hospital in Toronto, Ontario, Canada

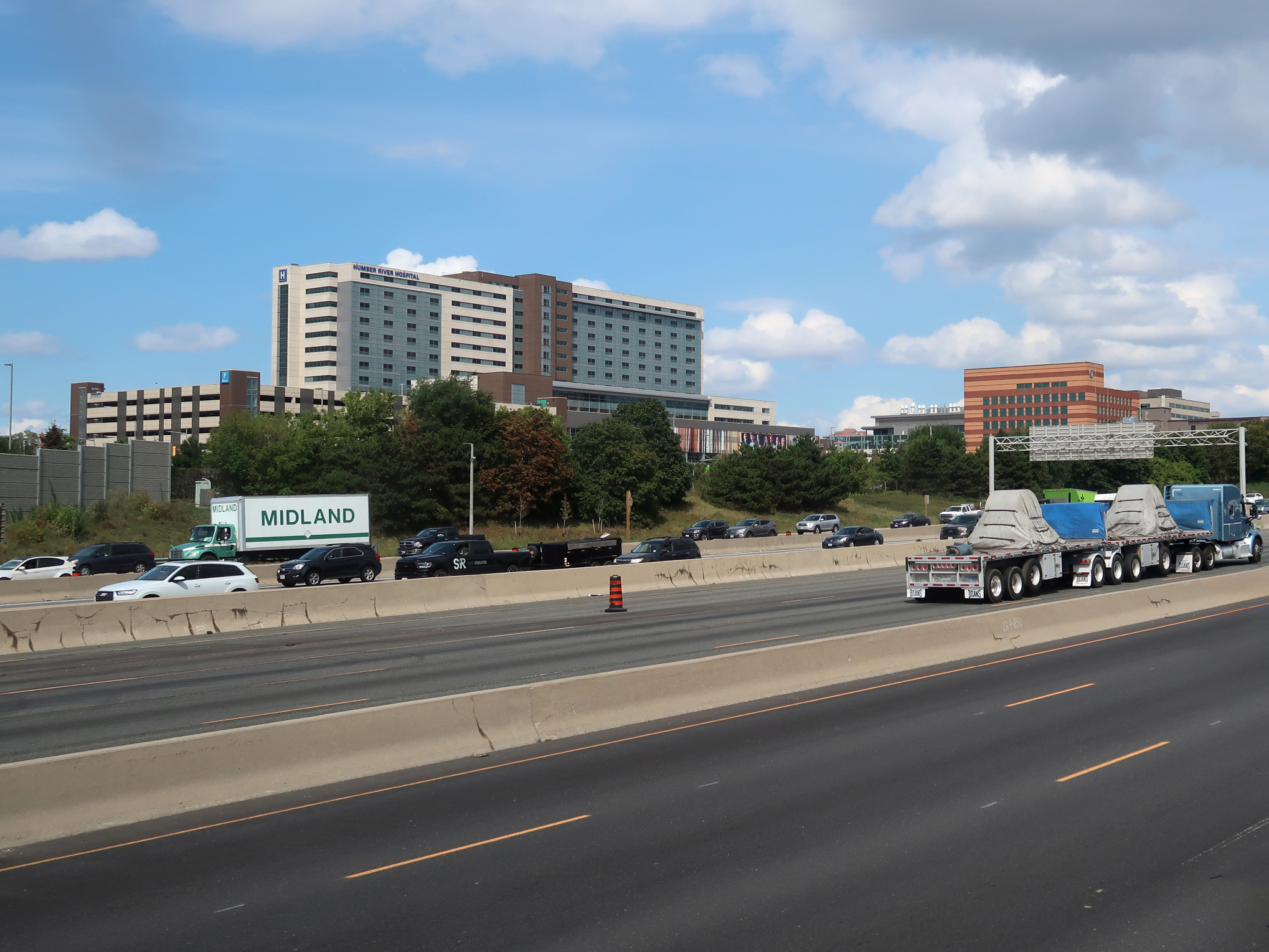

Geography
- Location: 1235 Wilson Avenue, Toronto, Ontario, Canada

Organization
- Care system: Public Medicare (Canada)
- Type: Acute Care
- Affiliated university: University of Toronto; Queen's University
- Network: TAHSN

Services
- Emergency department: Yes
- Beds: 722

History
- Former name: Humber River Hospital
- Founded: 1997

Links
- Website: http://www.hrh.ca/
- Lists: Hospitals in Canada

Hennick Humber Hospital (formerly known as Humber River Hospital) is a major acute care hospital in Toronto, Ontario, Canada, located in the northwest part of Toronto, near Highway 401 and Keele Street. It is a large community hospital offering emergency and intensive care services, maternal and child services along with other services such as cardiology, orthopaedic surgery and cancer care. In the 2019-2020 fiscal year, there were nearly 30,000 inpatient stays, with an average length of stay of 7.0 days, and 135,000 emergency department visits. The hospital was renamed Hennick Humber Hospital on April 10, 2026.

It is an associate member of the Toronto Academic Health Science Network (TAHSN), a consortium of medical organizations affiliated with the University of Toronto.

== History ==
Hennick Humber Hospital is the merged facility of three previous hospitals: Humber Memorial Hospital on Church Street in the former town of Weston, the York-Finch Hospital and the Northwestern General Hospital. The three hospitals were part of the Humber River Regional Hospital health network.

Construction on the CA$1.6 billion facility began in October 2011 on the site of a former Ministry of Transportation of Ontario parking lot on Keele Street north of the 401 highway. The Plenary Health Care Partnerships consortium was the builder of the hospital. The new hospital was designed by HDR Architects, NOT engineered by WSP but, rather multiple smaller local engineering firms and built by PCL. The new hospital opened in 2015.

Ambulatory and Urgent Care services remained open at the York-Finch site, and the Humber Memorial site re-opened in 2016 to provide dialysis, out-patient physiotherapy and the Community Care Access Centre (CCAC) wound and skin clinic on a temporary basis. The Finch and Church sites are known as the "Reactivation Centres (RCC)". Both RCCs contain Reactivation Care Units for multiple hospitals in the GTA. Both RCCs are also currently home to COVID-19 assessment centres. The Keele Street site was sold to the Daniels Corporation developer, which plans to build a new neighbourhood on the site.

In 2017, the hospital opened its "Command Centre" that was built in collaboration with GE Healthcare. It includes a Wall of Analytics to improve efficiency throughout the hospital and improve wait times and other issues. The CEO is Barbara Collins.

In 2026, Humber River Health received a $50 million donation from the Hennick Family Foundation, which was co-founded by Jay S. Hennick and his wife, Barbara. It is the biggest single donation in the history of the hospital. As a result, the hospital was renamed Hennick Humber Hospital.

== Programs and services ==
The hospital is affiliated with the University of Toronto and Queen's University. Its programs and services include:

- cancer care
- emergency department
- intensive care unit
- laboratory services
- maternity
- medical imaging
- mental health and addictions program
- nephrology program - at Wilson Avenue and Church Street sites
- surgical program
