= Hennick Bridgepoint Hospital =

- Sinai Health System

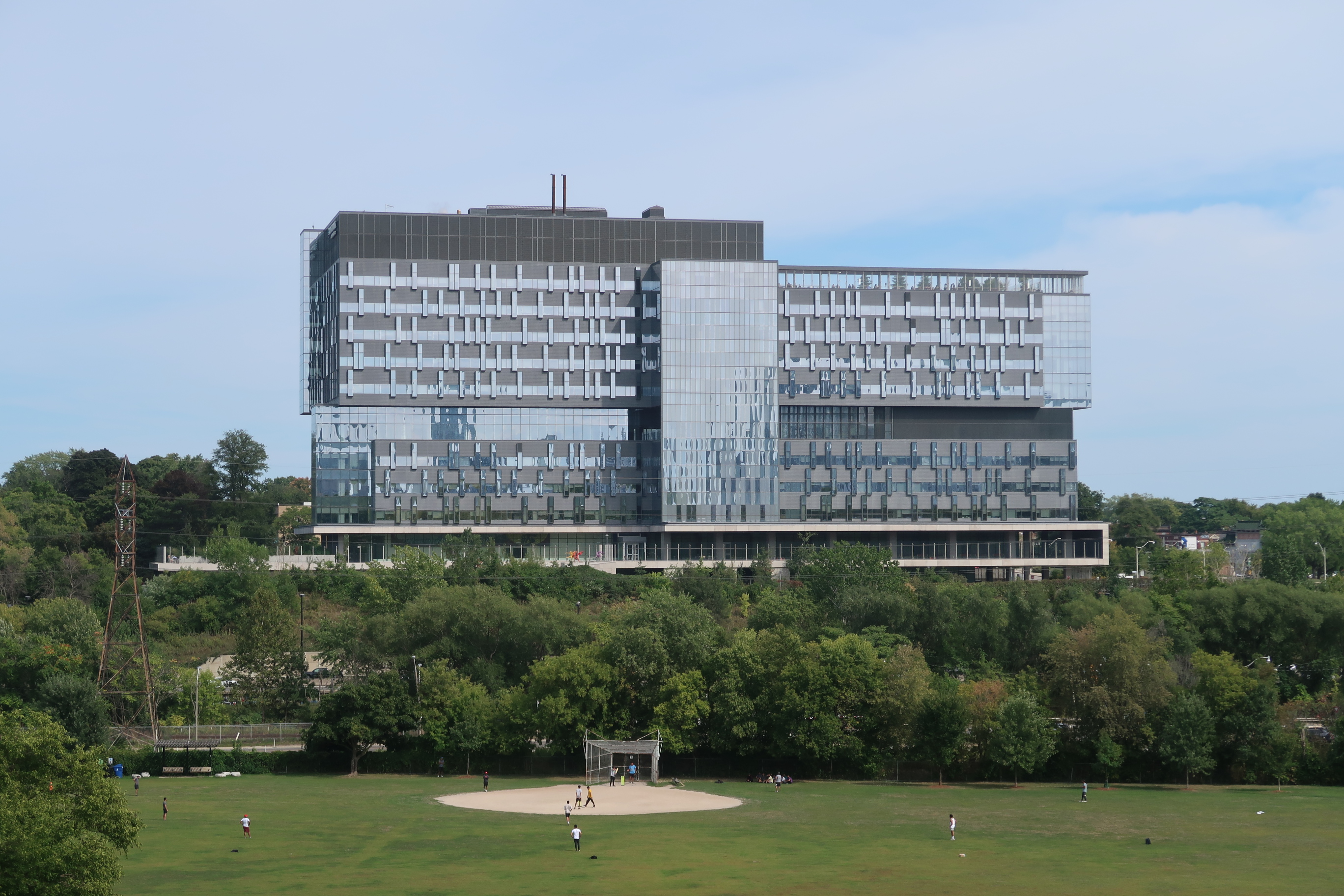

Geography
- Location: 1 Bridgepoint Drive, Toronto, Ontario, Canada
- Coordinates: 43°39′59″N 79°21′16″W

Organization
- Type: Specialist
- Affiliated university: University of Toronto

Services
- Emergency department: No
- Beds: 464
- Speciality: Rehabilitation hospital and complex care

History
- Founded: 1875

Links
- Website: www.hennickbridgepointhospital.ca
- Lists: Hospitals in Canada

Hennick Bridgepoint Hospital, formerly Bridgepoint Active Healthcare, is a complex care and rehabilitation hospital in Toronto, Ontario. It is a member of the Sinai Health System and affiliated with the University of Toronto.

In October 2021, Bridgepoint Active Healthcare was renamed Hennick Bridgepoint Hospital in recognition of a $36 million gift from Jay S. Hennick and Barbara Hennick, longtime leaders and supporters of Sinai Health. Jay Hennick was the Chair of the Board of Directors of Mount Sinai Hospital and Sinai Health from 2013 to 2016, while Barbara Hennick sat on the Sinai Health Foundation's Board of Directors and was President of the Auxiliary from 2005 to 2007."

== Location ==
The hospital is located next to the Don River in the Riverdale neighbourhood of Toronto and includes the historic Don Jail building, which is now the administration building for the hospital. The municipal address is 14 St. Matthews Road, Toronto, Ontario, at the corner of Broadview Avenue and Gerrard Street. The hospital building towers over the east side of the Don Valley Parkway.

== History ==
The "House of Refuge" was built on the site in 1860 as a home for "vagrants, the dissolute, and for idiots". The facility became the "Riverdale Isolation Hospital" in 1875 during a smallpox epidemic. It became a specialized facility located on the edge of the city to house patients with communicable diseases, such as tuberculosis. As times changed, in 1957, the hospital's name and mandate were changed; its focus was shifted to helping those with chronic ailments and/or needing rehabilitation, as the Riverdale Hospital. The architecturally distinctive brown brick "half-round" Riverdale Hospital - which become Bridgepoint Health in 2002 - was completed in 1963; was amalgamated structurally into the new Bridgepoint Active Healthcare campus. In 1997 as part of Mike Harris' cutbacks the government moved to close the original facility, but a community lobbying effort kept it open, and saved the historic Riverdale Hospital building.

=== Redevelopment ===
In 2003, a $200 million expansion project was announced, which modernized and expanded the facility. The final result is the purpose-built, 10-storey, 404-bed Bridgepoint Hospital building, which is connected by a glass walkway to the old Don Jail building. Part of the former Don Jail was demolished in 2014 as part of the Bridgepoint Redevelopment project.

The Community Master Plan was approved by the City of Toronto in 2006. The new facility serves as a 'living lab' to foster the research and treatment of complex chronic disease. It serves as a research base for the Bridgepoint Collaboratory for Research and Innovation.

Bridgepoint Active Healthcare and Infrastructure Ontario partnered with Plenary Health to design, build, finance and maintain the new facility for 30 years after completion. Construction started in the fall of 2009, and the facility has been fully operational since April 2013.

Patient services moved to the new hospital building on April 14, 2013. The 10-storey hospital building is adjacent to the former Don Jail building (completed in 1864), which now serves as the administrative wing of the hospital. The new building officially opened on June 25, 2013.

== Gallery ==
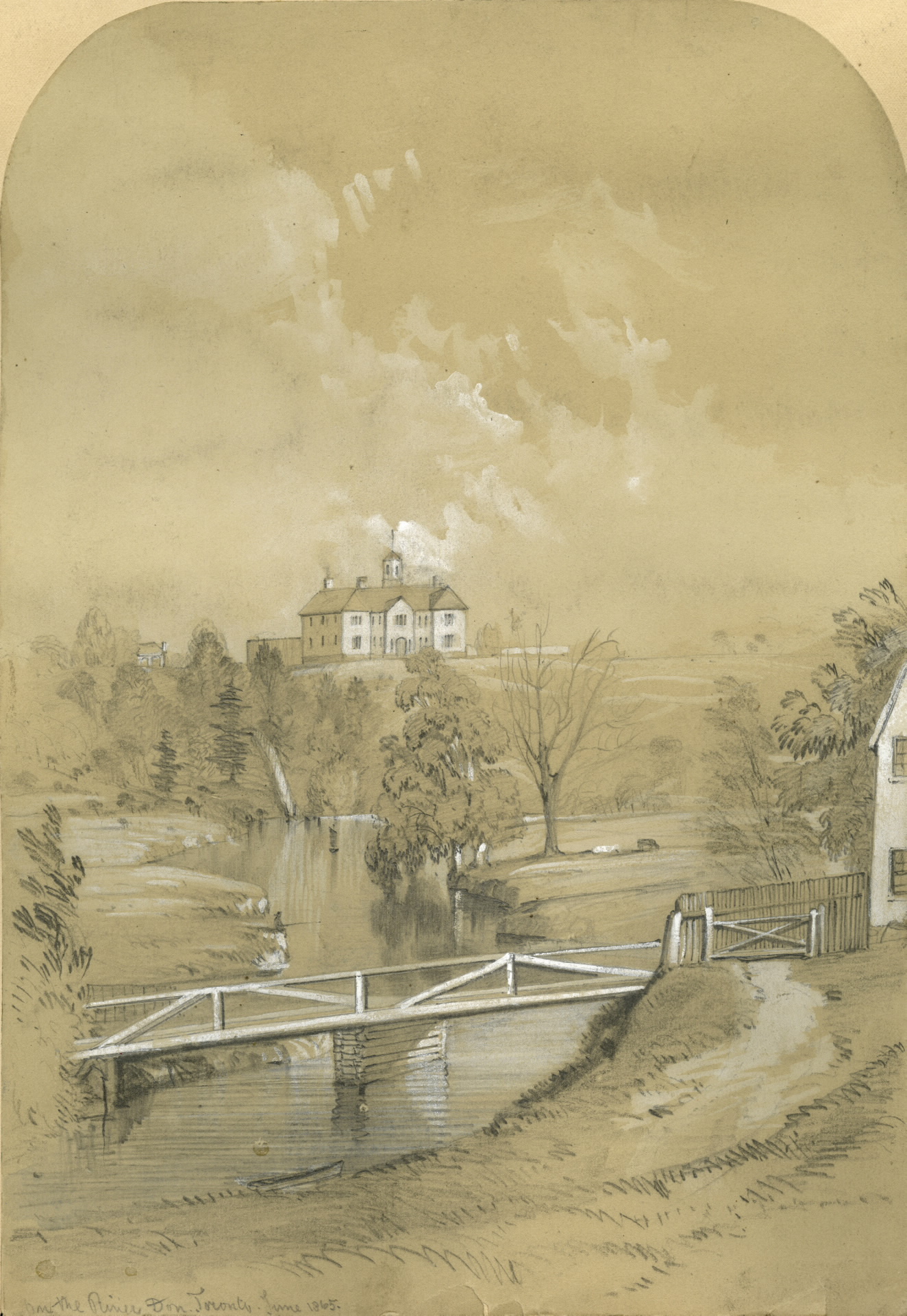
House of Refuge, 1865

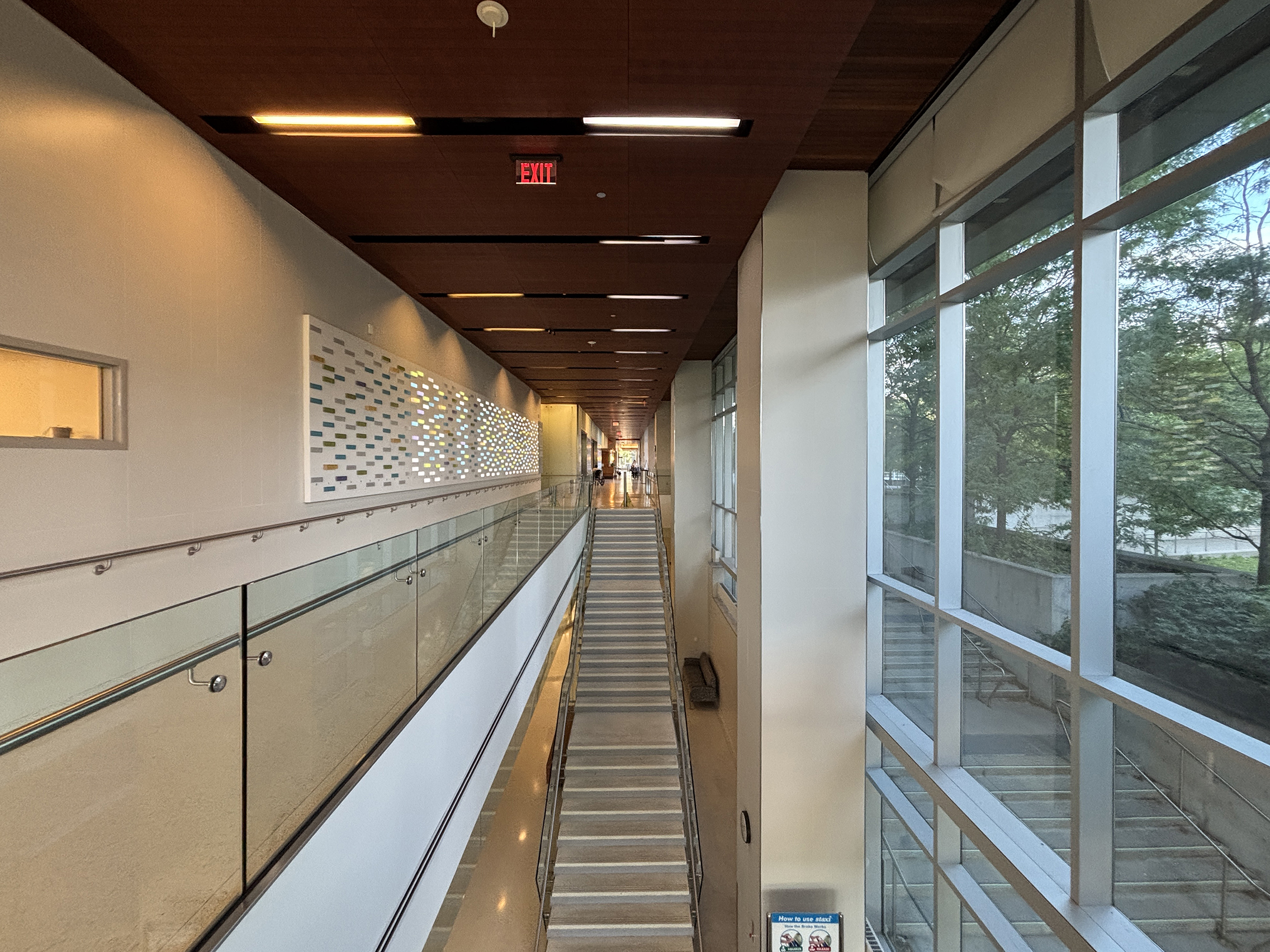
Interior of hospital

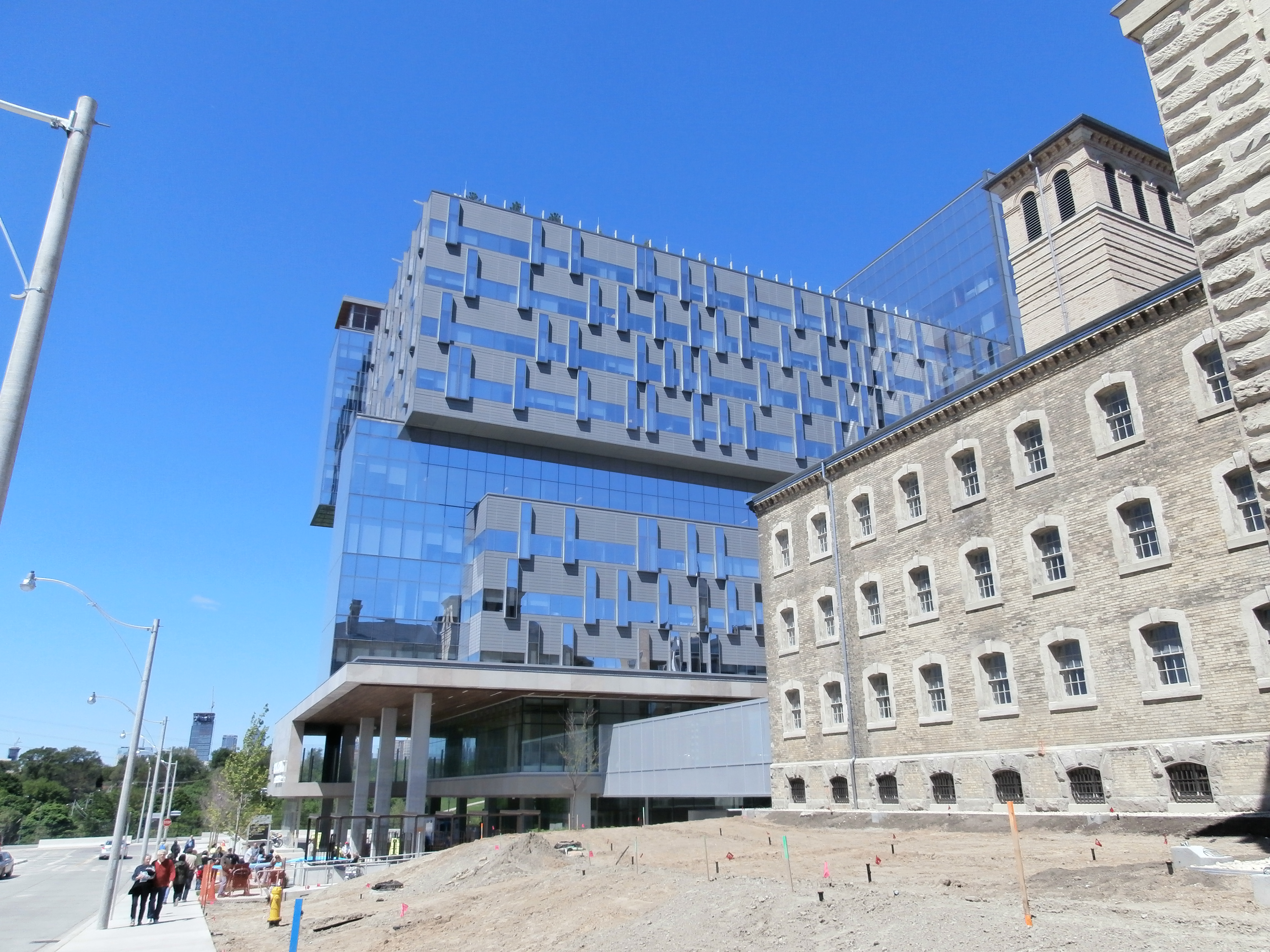
Newly constructed Bridgepoint Hospital building, connected to the former Don Jail, now the facility's administrative wing

Former logo prior to Sinai Health System affiliation
