= Evdokia Anagnostou =

Canadian pediatric neurologist

Evdokia Anagnostou is a Canadian pediatric neurologist. She is a professor in the Department of Pediatrics at the University of Toronto, and is cross-appointed as pediatric neurologist and a senior clinician scientist at the Holland Bloorview Kids Rehabilitation Hospital in Toronto, Canada. She is a Tier 2 Canada Research Chair in Translational Therapeutics in Autism Spectrum Disorder.

== Career ==
Anagnostou is currently a professor in the Department of Pediatrics at the University of Toronto, and a senior clinician scientist at the Holland Bloorview Kids Rehabilitation Hospital in Toronto, Canada. Her research focuses on translating findings from basic research studies in the field of Autism Spectrum Disorder and related neurodevelopmental conditions into novel therapeutics. Upon realizing that patients with Autism Spectrum Disorder often have additional disorders (including intellectual disability, ADHD and OCD), Anagnostou and her colleagues launched the Province of Ontario Neurodevelopmental Disorders (POND) Network in 2013 to study multiple neurodevelopmental disorders (including Autism Spectrum Disorder) together. She is a principal investigator at POND, funded by the Ontario Brain Institute. POND co-investigators include Stephen W. Scherer.

Anagnostou was appointed as the inaugural Dr. Stuart D. Sims Chair in Autism at the Holland Bloorview Kids Rehabilitation Hospital in December 2016, and co-leads the Autism Research Centre within the institution. She was also appointed as a Canada Research Chair in Translational Therapeutics in Autism Spectrum Disorder in November 2017. She is an associate editor for Molecular Autism and Autism Research, and a grant reviewer for multiple international agencies

Anagnostou's research has been cited over 23,000 times and has an h-index of 71. She regularly comments on Autism Spectrum Disorder as an expert on various Canadian media platforms.

== Selected bibliography ==
- Hollander et al. Striatal volume on magnetic resonance imaging and repetitive behaviors in autism. Biological Psychiatry. 2005.
- Hollander et al. Oxytocin increases retention of social cognition in autism. Biological Psychiatry. 2007.
- King et al. Lack of efficacy of citalopram in children with autism spectrum disorders and high levels of repetitive behavior: citalopram ineffective in children with autism. Archives of General Psychiatry. 2009.
- Glessner et al. Autism genome-wide copy number variation reveals ubiquitin and neuronal genes. Nature. 2009.
- Pinto et al. Convergence of genes and cellular pathways dysregulated in autism spectrum disorders. The American Journal of Human Genetics. 2014.

== Honours and awards ==
- Inaugural Dr. Stuart D. Sims Chair in Autism at the Holland Bloorview Kids Rehabilitation Hospital
- Canada Research Chair in Translational Therapeutics in Autism Spectrum Disorder
