= Trillium Health Partners =

Geography
- Location: Mississauga and Toronto, Ontario, Canada

Organization
- Care system: Public Medicare (Canada) (OHIP)
- Type: General
- Affiliated university: University of Toronto; Toronto Metropolitan University
- Network: TAHSN

Services
- Emergency department: Yes - at Mississauga Hospital and Credit Valley Hospital
- Beds: 1,256

History
- Founded: December 1, 2011

Links
- Website: www.thp.ca
- Lists: Hospitals in Canada

Trillium Health Partners is a hospital system which serves Mississauga and western Toronto in the Canadian province of Ontario. It comprises the Credit Valley Hospital, Mississauga Hospital, and Queensway Health Centre. Trillium Health Partners is Canada's largest community-based, academically affiliated hospital, and has the largest emergency department in the country. It is an associate member of the Toronto Academic Health Science Network (TAHSN), a consortium of hospitals affiliated with the University of Toronto.

== Formation ==
Trillium Health Partners was formed with the amalgamation of the Trillium Health Centre and the Credit Valley Hospital on December 1, 2011. The two-site Trillium Health Centre was itself the result of a 1998 amalgamation between Mississauga Hospital (established 1958 as South Peel Hospital) and Queensway General Hospital (established 1956).

== Constituent hospitals ==
=== Credit Valley Hospital ===
Credit Valley Hospital (founded 1985) is a 382-bed regional hospital serving the northern neighbourhoods of Mississauga. It is equipped with a helipad for air ambulance services.

=== Mississauga Hospital ===
Mississauga Hospital (founded 1958 as South Peel Hospital) is a 751-bed regional hospital serving the central and southern neighbourhoods of Mississauga. It also is the site of regional stroke, cancer, cardiovascular health and cardiac surgery, as well as neurological care centres.

=== Queensway Health Centre ===
Queensway Health Centre
- Trillium Health Partners
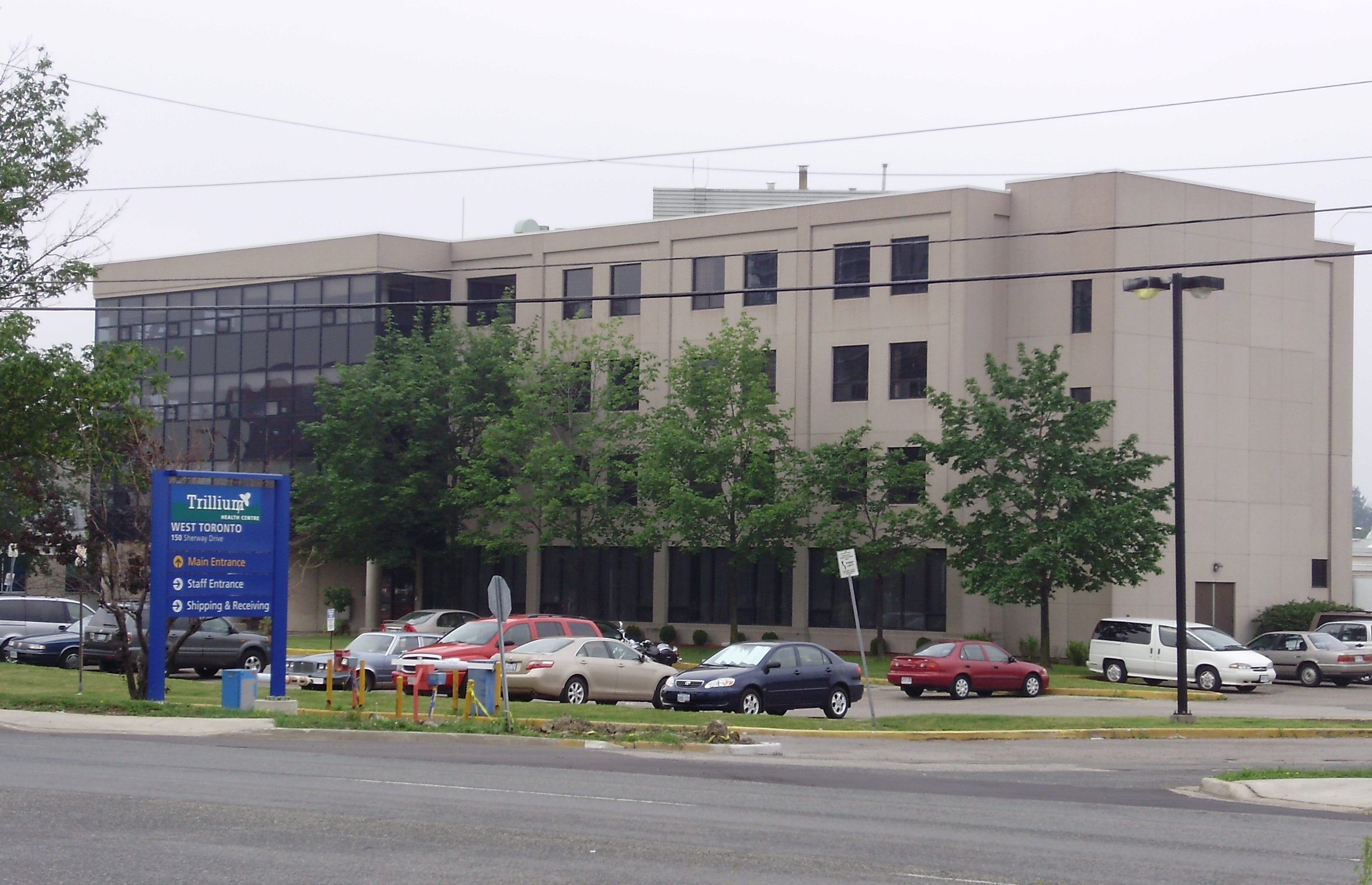

Geography
- Location: 150 Sherway Drive; Toronto, Ontario; M9C 1A5
- Coordinates: 43.60938°N 79.56237°W

Organisation
- Care system: Medicare

History
- Founded: 1956 (as Queensway General Hospital)

Queensway Health Centre (founded 1956 as Queensway General Hospital) is the ambulatory care centre for the hospital group. It provides urgent care (non-emergency) to residents of western Toronto and central-southern Mississauga, relieving pressure on the emergency room at Mississauga Hospital and other nearby hospitals. The Queensway Health Centre is also the site of rehabilitation services, a Complex Continuing Care unit, the Betty Wallace Women's Health Clinic, and the Kingsway Financial Spine Centre.

In 2022, Trillium received a $105 million donation from the Peter Gilgan Foundation, for this hospital and Mississauga Hospital. After the expansion is complete, it will be known as the Gilgan Family Queensway Health Centre.

== Affiliation with the University of Toronto ==
In 2011, the University of Toronto's Temerty Faculty of Medicine established the Mississauga Academy of Medicine (MAM) in partnership with Trillium Health Partners. MAM is one of the five academies in the Faculty of Medicine's MD program. The partnership allows students to study on the university's Mississauga campus and receive training at nearby teaching hospitals.

== Charitable foundation ==
Trillium Health Partners' work of providing health care is supported by the fundraising efforts of the Trillium Health Partners Foundation, which was formed through the merger of the Credit Valley Hospital Foundation and the Trillium Health Centre Foundation in 2013.
