= Holland Bloorview Kids Rehabilitation Hospital =

Hospital in Toronto, Ontario, Canada

Coordinates: 43.718447°N 79.372900°W

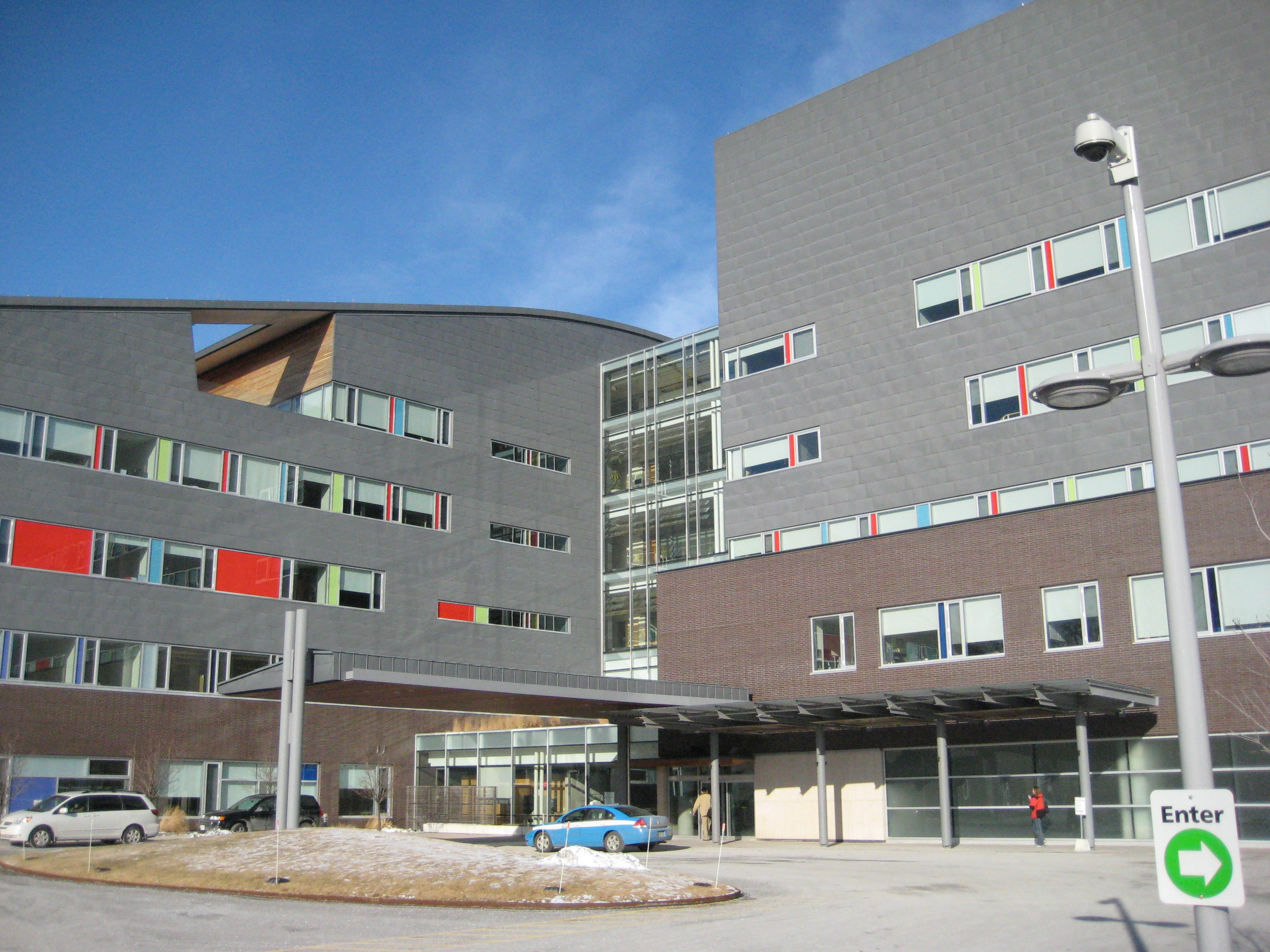

Geography
- Location: 150 Kilgour Road; Toronto, Ontario, Canada; M4G 1R8

Organisation
- Care system: Medicare
- Type: Paediatric Rehabilitation
- Affiliated university: University of Toronto
- Network: TAHSN

Services
- Emergency department: No
- Beds: 75

History
- Founded: 1899

Links
- Website: http://www.hollandbloorview.ca/

Holland Bloorview Kids Rehabilitation Hospital is Canada's largest children's rehabilitation hospital. It is located in Toronto, Ontario, Canada. It was founded in 1899, by a group of community-minded women who met in Toronto to discuss the creation of a "Home for Incurable Children". A member of the Toronto Academic Health Science Network (TAHSN), it is fully affiliated with the University of Toronto.

As of 2005, the Centre provides hospital care, outpatient clinics, an integrated kindergarten school programme, assistive technology services and community outreach activities to about 7,000 children and youth with disabilities and their families each year. The most common conditions are cerebral palsy, acquired brain injury, muscular dystrophy, amputation, epilepsy, spina bifida, and cleft lip and palate, and a range of developmental disabilities including autism.

Prior to 2006, the centre was called the Bloorview MacMillan Children's Centre. From 1957 to the mid-1980s, it was known as the Ontario Crippled Children's Centre (OCCC). Bloorview part of the hospital's name came from their former home at 192 Bloor Street East, also known as Bloorview. The MacMillan part came from Dr. Hugh MacMillan, a pathologist who became the former assistant administrator and hospitalist at the hospital after he fell ill with polio. His name was added to the hospital in 1985.

Today the hospital is named for donors Susanne and Bill Holland. Bill Holland was CEO of CI Financial Corporation.

Bloorview Kids Foundation is the largest foundation supporting childhood disability in Canada. The Foundation was established in 1996 to inspire community interest and raise funds in support of children and youth with disabilities at Bloorview Kids Rehab.

The site of the old Bloorview Hospital on Sheppard Avenue East in North York was sold to developers, though Bloorview retains a nursery centre in Forest Hill.

Since 2006, the hospital is located on 150 Kilgour Road, between Sunnybrook Health Sciences Centre and the community of Leaside.

Notable researchers at the hospital include Evdokia Anagnostou.
