= Providence Healthcare (Toronto) =

Hospital in Toronto, Ontario, Canada

Coordinates: 43.712°N 79.285°W

- Unity Health Toronto

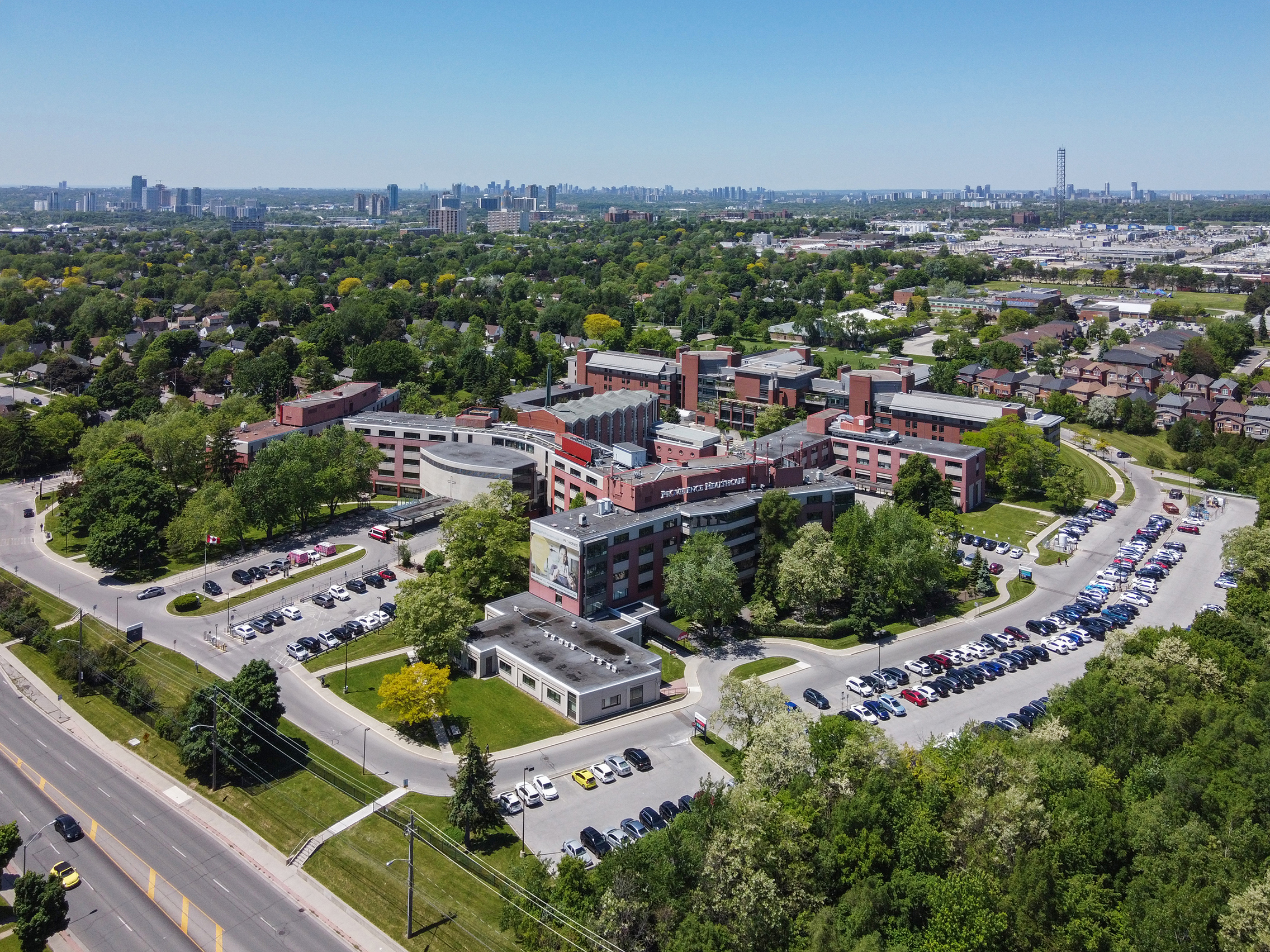
- Providence Healthcare in 2024

Geography
- Location: 3276 St. Clair Avenue East, Toronto, Ontario, Canada

Organization
- Care system: Public Medicare (Canada)
- Type: Specialist
- Religious affiliation: Catholic
- Affiliated university: University of Toronto
- Patron: Catholic Health Sponsors of Ontario

Services
- Beds: 245

History
- Founded: 1847

Links
- Website: unityhealth.to/locations/providence-healthcare/
- Lists: Hospitals in Canada

Providence Healthcare is a hospital and long-term care centre in Scarborough, Toronto, Ontario, Canada. It specializes in physical therapy for patients who have experienced strokes, orthopaedic surgery, or lower limb amputation.

== History ==
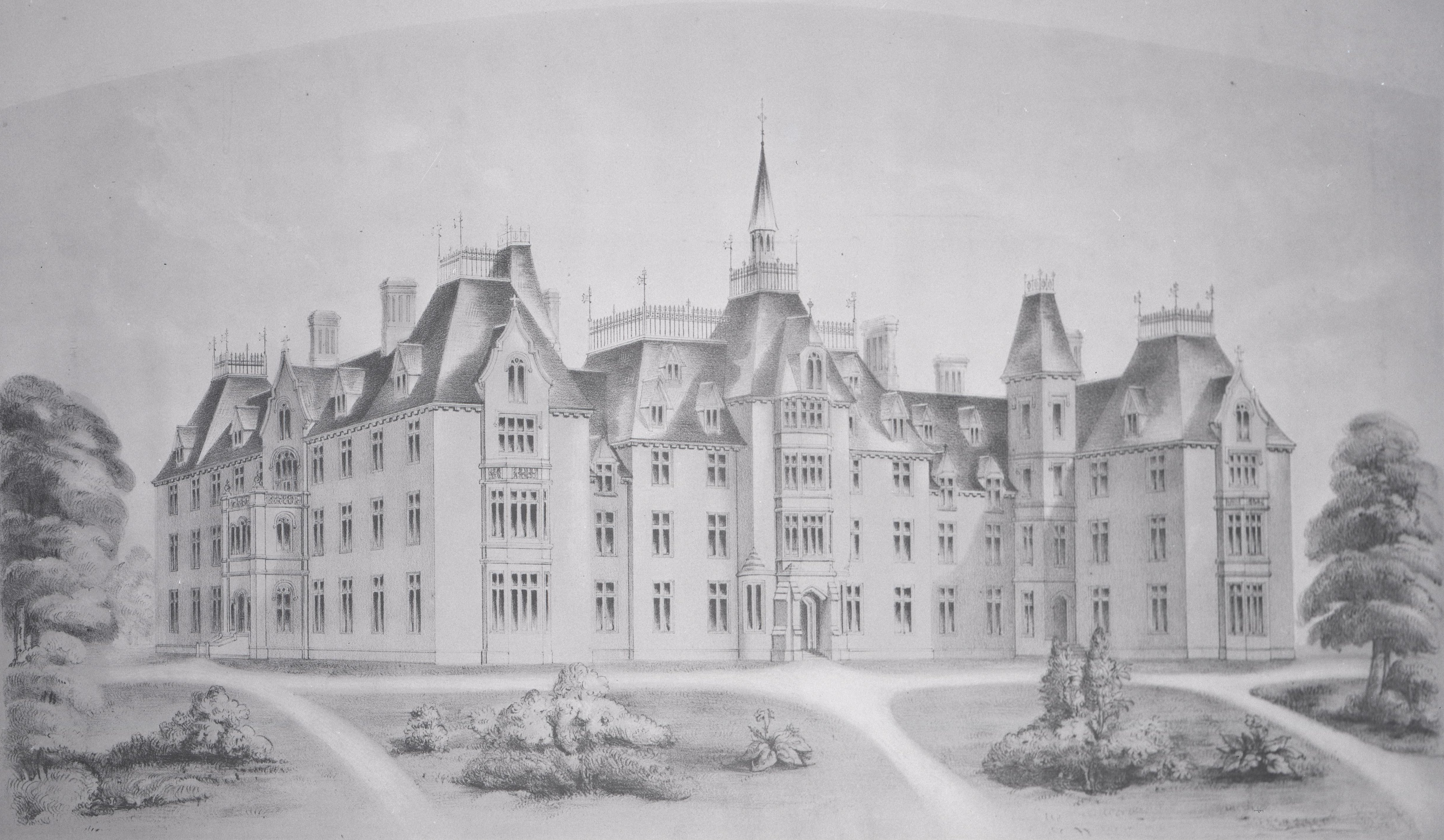
Toronto's original House of Providence, circa 1857

Providence Healthcare's Catholic legacy dates back to 1857 when the Sisters of St. Joseph founded the original House of Providence. The original site of the House of Providence was on Power Street in downtown Toronto, which is now the Don Valley Parkway exit to Adelaide and Richmond Streets. At that location, the House of Providence hit a peak of 700 people they were providing accommodations for. Among them were the most vulnerable in society.

Providence moved to its current location in 1962. The location is a former farm owned by the Sisters of St. Joseph. Once the facility changed its location it began to focus on residential care for the elderly and sick. Along with this, the name House of Providence changed to Providence Villa and Hospital. The name was changed once again to Providence Centre so it would better reflect its diversity of services, not only to residents and patients but the entire community.

The Sisters of St. Joseph sponsored Providence Centre up until 1998 when the Catholic Health Corporation of Ontario assumed sponsorship.

The name was changed once again in 2004 to Providence Healthcare.

On 1 August 2017, Providence Healthcare merged with St. Joseph's Health Centre and St. Michael's Hospital to form Unity Health Toronto.

== Services ==
Programs and services are provided through three Integrated Care Divisions: Providence Hospital, one of Ontario's largest rehabilitation and complex continuing care facilities; the Cardinal Ambrozic Houses of Providence, a long-term care facility for 288 residents; and Providence Community Centre, specializing in community clinics, caregiver support, education and neighbourhood outreach programs, such as Adult Day Program and the Tamil Caregiver Project. Included in the facility is an Integrated Healing Arts Centre. This centre offers services including acupuncture, chiropody, chiropractic services, massage therapy and physiotherapy

== Employment ==
In 2009, for the second year in a row, Providence Healthcare was named one of Greater Toronto's Top Employers by Mediacorp Canada Inc., which was announced by the Toronto Star newspaper.

== See also ==
- List of hospitals in Toronto
