= North York General Hospital =

Hospital in Toronto, Ontario, Canada

Coordinates: 43°46′10″N 79°21′46″W

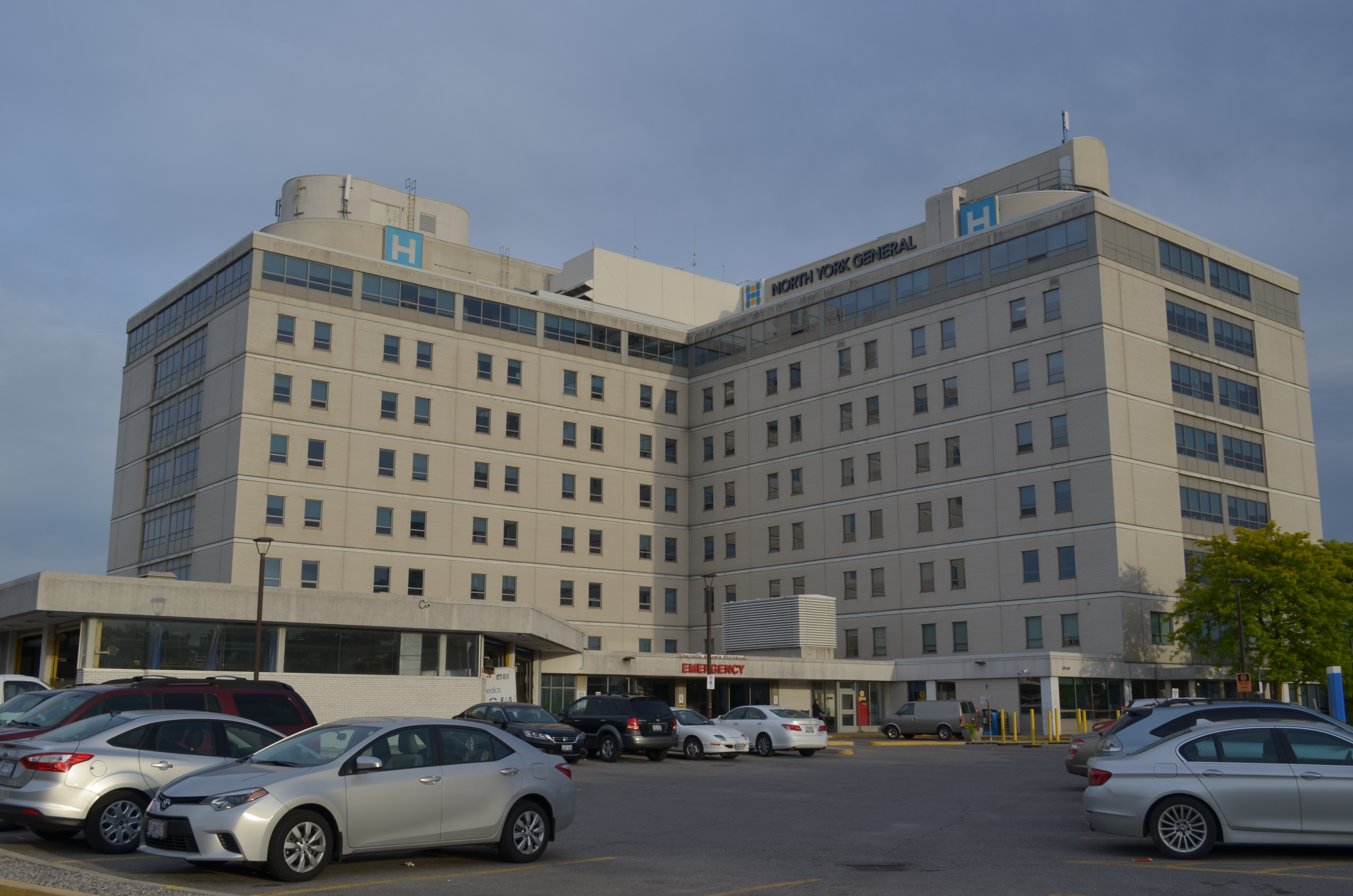
- Emergency entrance at NYGH

Geography
- Location: 4001 Leslie Street; Toronto, Ontario, Canada

Organization
- Care system: Public Medicare (Canada) (OHIP)
- Type: Community academic hospital
- Affiliated university: University of Toronto
- Network: TAHSN

Services
- Emergency department: Yes (acute, subacute and ambulatory care)
- Beds: 410 acute care beds and 192 long-term care beds

History
- Founded: 1968

Links
- Website: www.nygh.on.ca
- Lists: Hospitals in Canada

North York General Hospital (NYGH) is a teaching hospital in Toronto, Ontario, Canada. Primarily serving the North York district, as well as southern York Region, it offers acute care, ambulatory and long-term services at multiple sites. It is one of Canada's leading community academic hospitals and is affiliated with the University of Toronto as an associate member of the Toronto Academic Health Science Network (TAHSN). NYGH is one of the three constituent hospitals of the Peters-Boyd Academy of the University of Toronto Faculty of Medicine.

== History ==
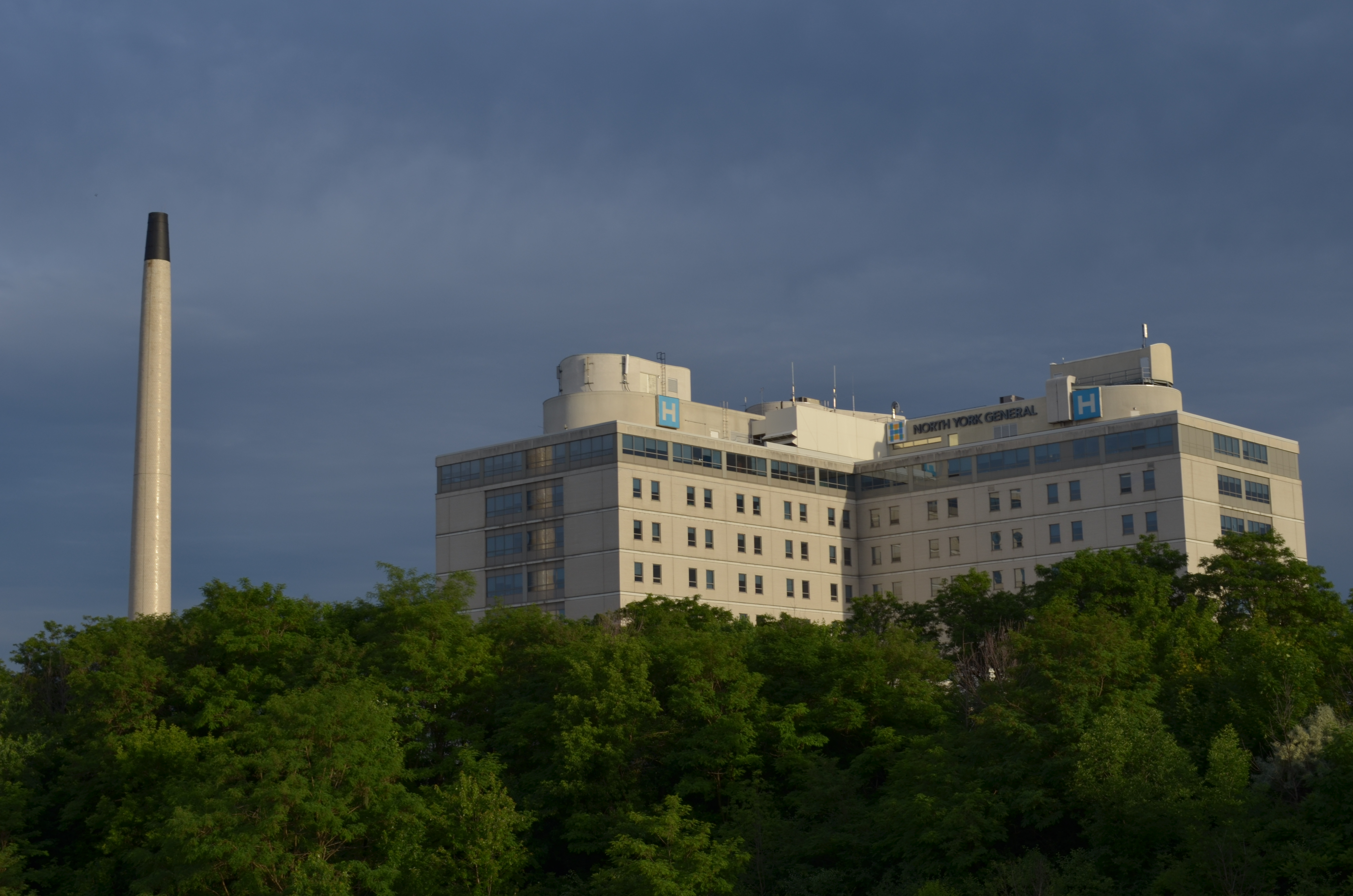
North York General Hospital from Leslie street

North York General Hospital at Leslie Street and Sheppard Avenue was opened in 1968. The four founding partners were: Friends of North York General (later to become the North York General Hospital Foundation); the Imperial Order Daughters of the Empire (IODE), a Canadian women's charitable organization; the Missionary Health Institute; and Volunteer Services. In 1960, a group of local citizens established the North Metropolitan Hospital Association to explore building a hospital to serve the growing area of North York. Under the leadership of Colonel Clifford Sifton, plans were made and funds raised for a 70-bed community hospital on the corner of Leslie and Sheppard. By November 1962, land on the Leslie site was obtained. Some 3,000 volunteers collected $3.2 million of the $8.6 million cost of the new hospital. On March 15, 1968, Premier John Robarts officially dedicated North York General Hospital.

The hospital underwent a major expansion that opened in 2003.

On 1 April 2003 a nurse was infected with SARS. Dr. Donald Low recalls poring over patient charts throughout the Victoria Day weekend, held that year on 19 May, when he hypothesized that a disease that caused the emergency that the province had declared finished a few days earlier was actually still spreading among health-care workers and hospital patients. Low resumed containment efforts and it took a city-wide effort to beat the outbreak completely. On July 2, the WHO removed Toronto from the list of affected cities. In Canada, health-care workers made up 43 per cent of SARS cases.

North York General encompassed satellite sites, such as Branson Ambulatory Care Centre and the Seniors' Health Centre and Reactivation Care Centre. On March 1, 2017, North York General Hospital announced the hospital would not be renewing its lease at the Branson Ambulatory Care Centre in 2019 and would begin to transition services from that site. On December 10, 2017, the Reactivation Care Centre: A Central LHIN Hospitals Collaborative opened at 2111 Finch Avenue West. In May 2018, the hospital announced two new locations would replace the Branson Ambulatory Care Centre.

In 2019, North York General Hospital was ranked the second best hospital in Canada and one of the top 100 hospitals in the world by Newsweek.

== Services ==
The General site is located at Leslie Street and Sheppard Avenue in north central Toronto. It offers services including inpatient acute care services and a 24-hour full service emergency. The Charlotte & Lewis Steinberg Emergency at the General site is a full-service emergency. In the 2019-2020 fiscal year there were 28,091 inpatient stays with an average length of stay of 5.1 days. The hospital emergency department had 118,800 visits in 2019-20.

The Cancer Program provides treatment for many types of cancers, including breast, colon, prostate, gynecological and urinary.

Other services in the hospital include family and community medicine, genetics testing, maternal and pediatric care, diagnostic imaging, geriatric care, mental health, and surgeries.

== Satellite sites ==
=== Branson Ambulatory Care Centre ===
The Branson Ambulatory Care Centre is located at Bathurst Street and Finch Avenue West. It opened in 1957 as the North York Branson Hospital by the Seventh-day Adventist Church. It was named for Mr. William Henry Branson, an Adventist missionary and President of the General Conference of Seventh-day Adventists. In 1997 it became part of North York General Hospital (as NYGH-Branson Division) after the final report by the Health Services Retructuring Commission. On March 1, 2017, North York General Hospital announced the hospital would not be renewing its lease at the Branson Ambulatory Care Centre in 2019 and would begin to transition services from that site. In May 2018, the hospital announced two new locations would replace the Branson Ambulatory Care Centre.

Due to the COVID-19 pandemic, it is currently being used as a COVID-19 assessment centre. The assessment centre occupies the former Urgent Care Centre.

=== Seniors' Health Centre and Reactivation Care Centre ===
The Seniors' Health Centre opened in 1985 and is located at 2 Buchan Court (Leslie and Sheppard). It houses both a long-term care home with 192 beds and Specialized Geriatric Services. These services are aimed at seniors with medical or mental health problems that threaten their independence or the ability to live at home. Along with the day hospital, the Seniors' Health Centre offers many elder care clinics.

The Reactivation Care Centre is a collaborative and innovative approach designed to help patients who no longer need acute care services, but often find themselves waiting for an alternate care facility, such as convalescent and long-term care. NYGH has a patient unit in the centre.

== Controversies ==
In February 2026, North York General Hospital was the subject of public scrutiny following a broadcast by OMNI News detailing the death of a cardiac patient.The family of the patient publicly alleged that the hospital failed to provide adequate monitoring, citing a 72-hour period in a regular ward without telemetry. A public petition regarding the incident garnered over 500 signatures, and the family reported bringing the matter to the attention of provincial representatives, including the office of the Official Opposition Critic for Health.
