= St. Michael's Hospital (Toronto) =

Hospital in Toronto, Ontario, Canada

- Unity Health Toronto

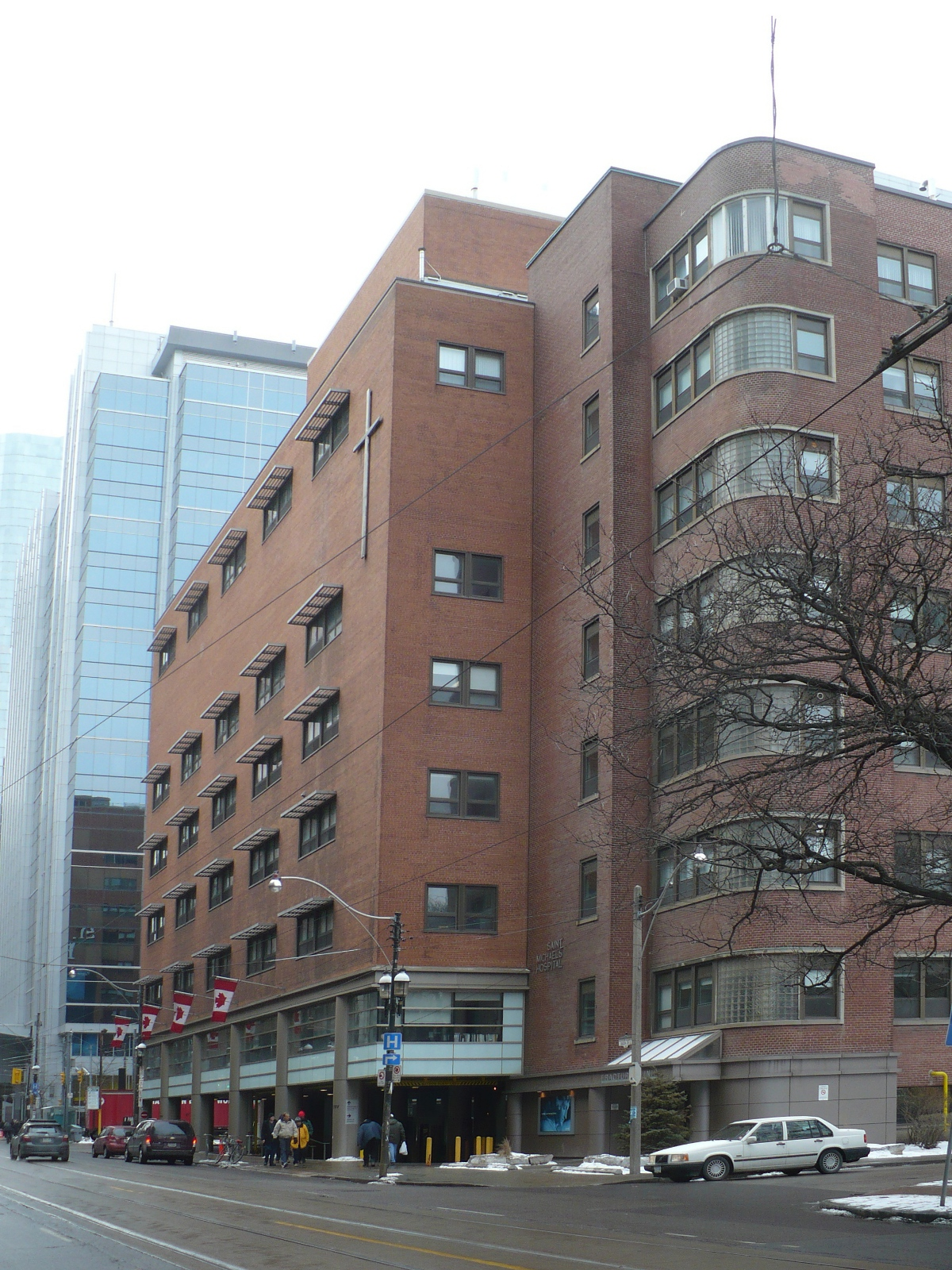
- St. Michael's, Queen Street entrance

- Location in Toronto

Geography
- Location: 30 Bond Street; Toronto, Ontario; M5B 1W8
- Coordinates: 43.6532°N 79.3775°W

Organisation
- Care system: Medicare
- Type: Teaching
- Affiliated university: University of Toronto
- Network: TAHSN

Services
- Emergency department: Level I Trauma Centre
- Beds: 463

Helipads
- Helipad: TC LID: CTM4

History
- Founded: 1892

Links
- Website: www.stmichaelshospital.com

St. Michael's Hospital is a teaching hospital and medical centre, part of Unity Health Toronto in Toronto, Ontario, Canada. It was established by the Sisters of St. Joseph in 1892 with the founding goal of taking care of the sick and the poor of Toronto's inner city. The hospital provides tertiary and quaternary services in cardiovascular surgery, neurosurgery, inner city health, and therapeutic endoscopy. It is one of two Level 1 adult trauma centres in Greater Toronto, along with the larger Sunnybrook Health Sciences Centre. As trauma centres, both St. Michael's and Sunnybrook are equipped with helipads. It is one of several teaching hospitals of the University of Toronto and is a member of the Toronto Academic Health Science Network (TAHSN).

== Overview ==
The hospital is located near the intersection of Queen Street and Yonge Street, in Downtown Toronto's Garden District. The hospital serves a diverse population, which includes the affluent condominium complexes in Harbourfront, the underprivileged of the inner city of Regent Park, and the gay and lesbian community in Church and Wellesley. The hospital has 463 inpatient beds and extensive outpatient clinics.

The physician-in-chief is Sharon Straus, the surgeon-in-chief is Najma Ahmed, the vice-president of research and innovation is Ori Rotstein, and the president and CEO is Tim Rutledge. The hospital also has a large team of volunteers. The hospital absorbed the Wellesley endoscopy group after the closure of Wellesley Hospital.

Documentary filmmaker Katerina Cizek teamed up with frontline health care workers at the hospital in the National Film Board of Canada's filmmaker-in-residence project, which received the 2008 Webby Award for the best online documentary series.

In October 2008, St. Michael's was named one of Greater Toronto's Top Employers by Mediacorp Canada Inc., which was announced by the Toronto Star newspaper. The hospital was also named one of the Best Employers for New Canadians for six consecutive years, from 2008 to 2013.

== History ==
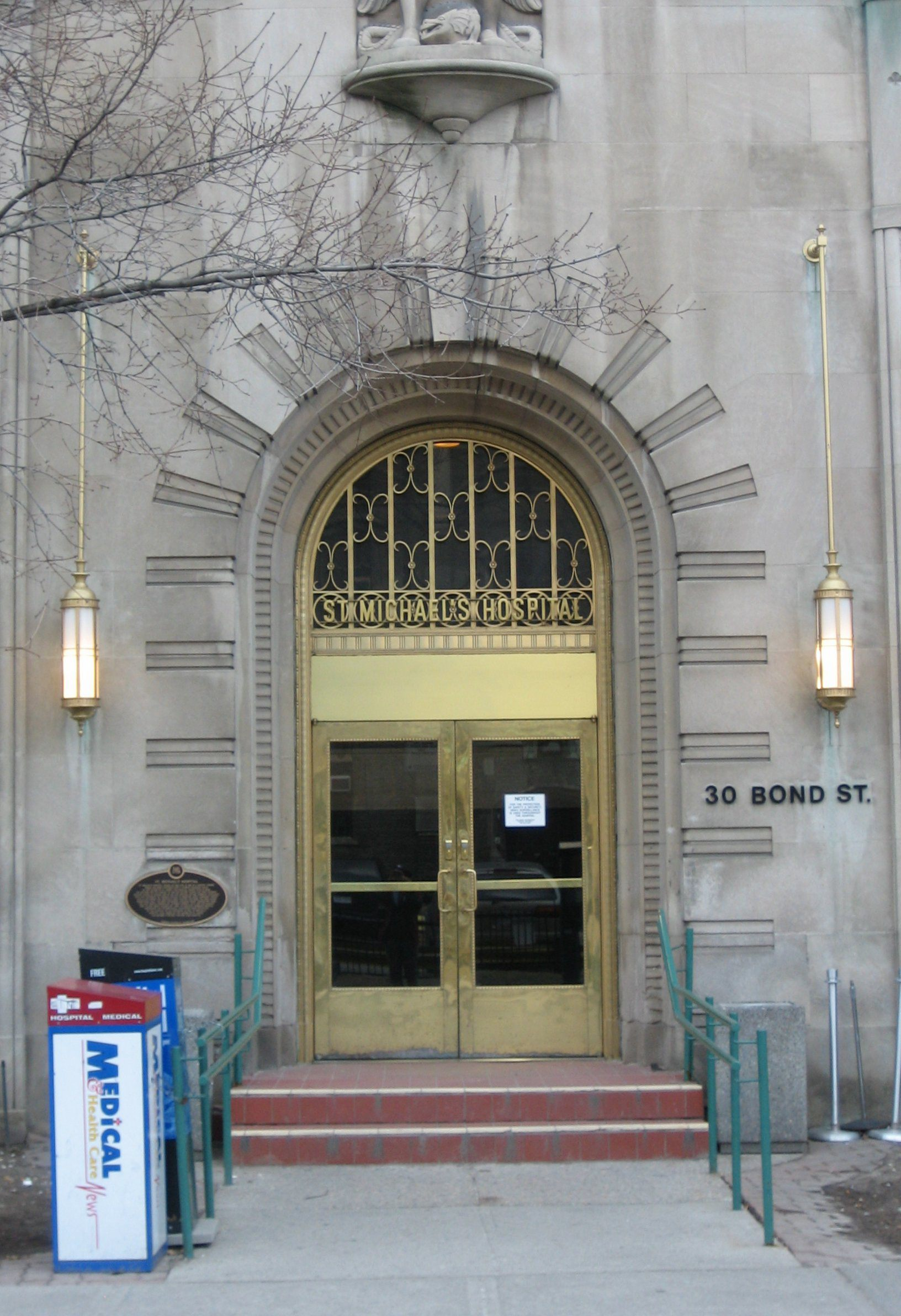
Art Deco Bond Street entrance

St. Michael's Hospital was founded as a Catholic hospital in 1892 by the Sisters of St. Joseph, who operated the Notre Dame des Anges, a boarding house for working women. Originally an old Baptist church, the hospital on Bond Street was created in response to care for the poor population in the south end of Toronto.

The hospital opened with a bed capacity of 26 and a staff of six doctors and four graduate nurses. Within a year, it was expanded to include two large wards and an emergency department.

In 1894, Toronto-based railway magnate Hugh Ryan funded a major extension of the hospital —building a three-storey surgical wing that included an operating theatre designed to accommodate fifty medical students and ten wards each containing ten beds. These additions, which cost $40,000 (the equivalent of $1.48 million in 2024), placed the hospital on the path to becoming the preeminent teaching hospital it is today.

As early as 1895, St. Michael's Hospital started receiving medical students. It negotiated a formal agreement with the Faculty of Medicine at the University of Toronto in 1920 that has continued to this day.

By 1912, the hospital's bed capacity had reached 300, and a five-room operating suite was added. The ongoing physical expansion, most prominently in the 1960s, increased the original 26-bed facility to 900 beds.

Between 1892 and 1974, St. Michael's school of nursing graduated 81 classes, totalling 5,177 graduates. The school was closed in 1974, when nursing education was moved into the province's college system. Thereafter, the hospital opened a school for medical record librarians, the first in Canada, and participated in the preparation of dietitians and X-ray and laboratory technologists.

In March 2010, the hospital re-branded itself to simply St. Michael's to reflect its growing movement into medical research. Meanwhile, a new motto ("Inspired Care. Inspiring Science.") was also revealed.

On 1 August 2017, St. Michael's Hospital merged with St. Joseph's Health Centre and Providence Healthcare to form a new hospital network known as Unity Health Toronto.

== Construction ==
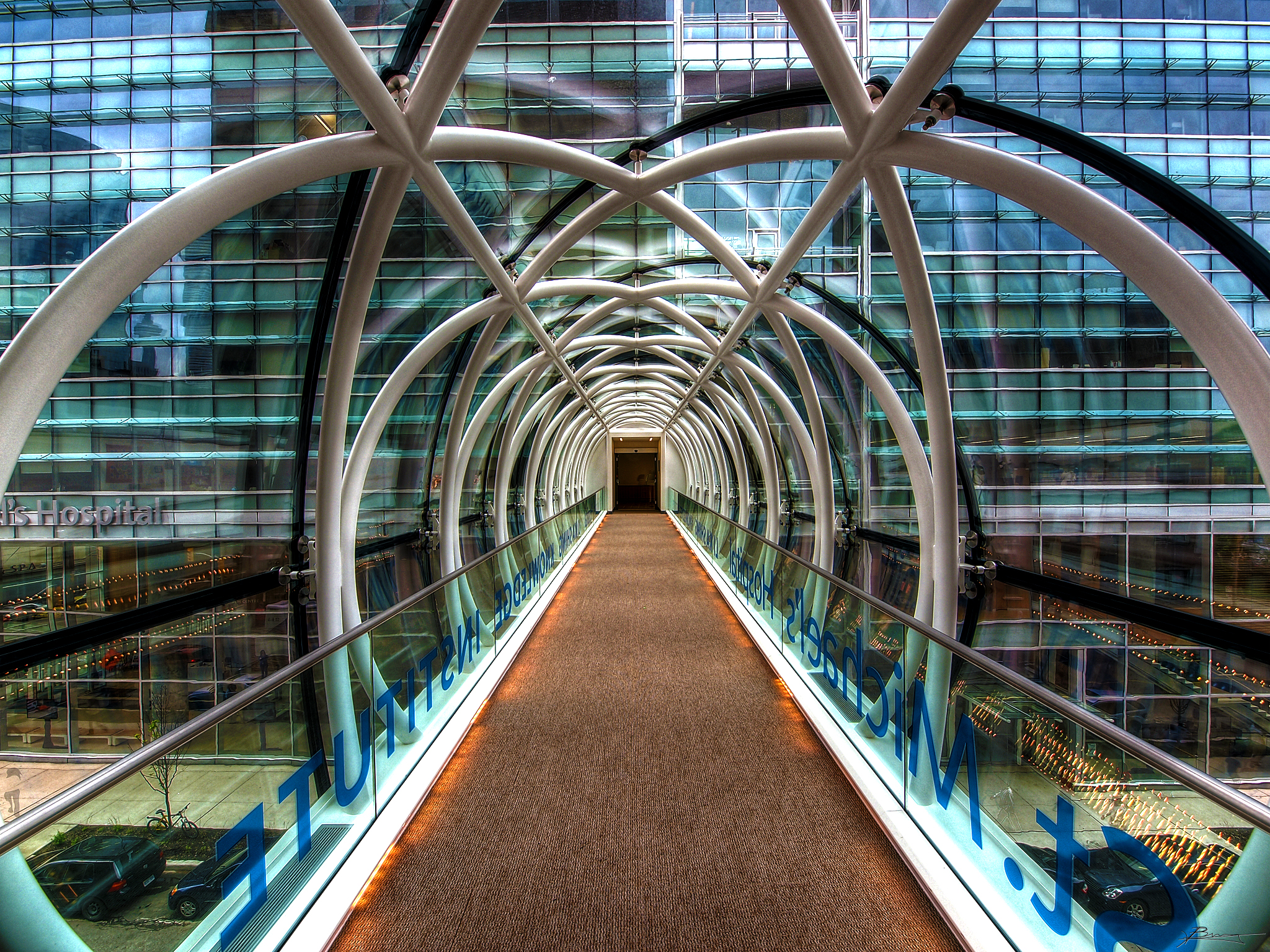
Glass bridge in the hospital

St. Michael's is undergoing major renovations most notably on the northeast corner (Shuter wing). The 17-storey Peter Gilgan Patient Care Tower was recently completed in 2020. Construction began in April 2015. This 250,000-square-foot addition boasts a new main entrance and an emergency department nearly twice the size of the prior one. It was expected to cost around CA$301 million.

== Services ==
- Chiropody
- Chiropractic
- Coronary care unit
- Critical care
- Diabetes comprehensive care including diabetes education centre; and endocrinology
- Vitreoretinal surgery
- Heart and vascular disease
- Inner city health
- Neurology and musculoskeletal disorders
- Obstetrics and gynecology
- Pediatrics
- Psychiatry
- Specialized complex care
- Trauma and neurosurgery
- General surgery and acute care surgery
- Advanced colorectal surgery
- Complex surgical oncology
- Breast surgery
- Minimally invasive surgery
- Therapeutic endoscopy

The hospital is also home to the Li Ka Shing Knowledge Institute, with a state-of-the-art building, opened on October 18, 2011. The Knowledge Institute aims to bring together the areas of research and education to bring advances to patient care sooner. It is also the home of the Toronto Platelet Immunobiology Group, a group of scientists and physicians that perform research in platelet and bleeding disorders.

St. Michael's is one of a few GTA hospitals with helicopter landing facilities and one of two in downtown Toronto (the other is at the Hospital for Sick Children). The helipad (TC LID: CTM4) is located on the roof of the main hospital wing in the north end at Shuter Street and Victoria Street.
