= Mississauga Hospital =

- Trillium Health Partners

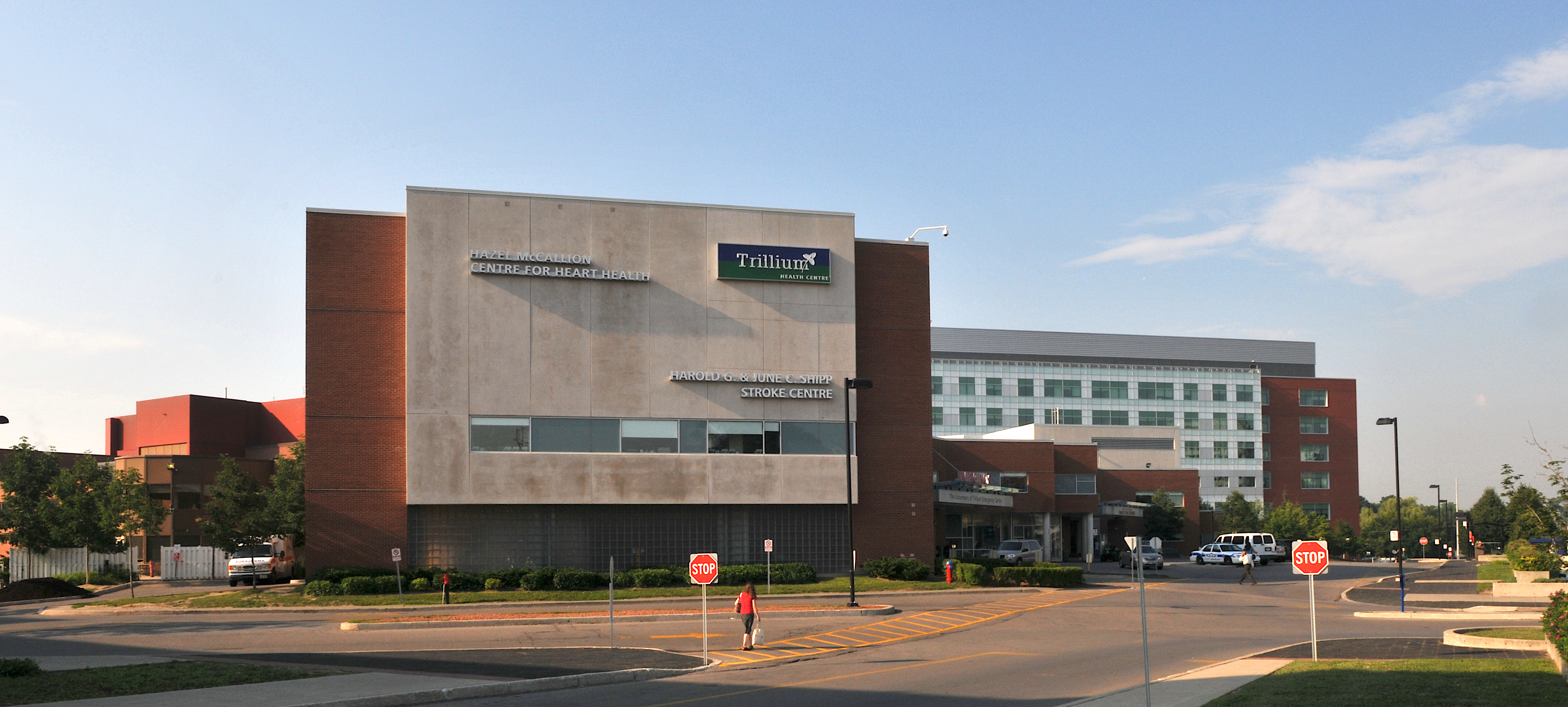
- North side of Mississauga Hospital seen in 2009

Geography
- Location: 100 Queensway West, Mississauga, Ontario, Canada

Organization
- Care system: Medicare
- Type: General
- Affiliated university: University of Toronto

Services
- Emergency department: Yes
- Beds: 751

History
- Former name: South Peel Hospital; Trillium Health Centre Mississauga
- Founded: 1958

Links
- Website: trilliumhealthpartners.ca

Mississauga Hospital is a regional and teaching hospital in Mississauga, Ontario, Canada. It provides general medical services to residents of central and southern Mississauga as well as regional stroke, cardiac, and neurological care.

Founded in 1958 as South Peel Hospital, the hospital was renamed to Mississauga Hospital in 1980. After a 1997 government mandate to restructure, the hospital merged with the nearby Queensway General Hospital in Toronto in April 1998 to form a new hospital corporation named Trillium Health Centre. From 1998 to 2011 the hospital was known as Trillium Health Centre Mississauga. The name was reverted to Mississauga Hospital following Trillium Health Centre's merger with Credit Valley Hospital on December 1, 2011, to form Trillium Health Partners.

In 2022, Trillium received a $105 million donation from the Peter Gilgan Foundation, for this hospital and Queensway Health Centre. After the rebuild of the hospital, it will be known as the Peter Gilgan Mississauga Hospital.

== Programs and services ==
- Regional Stroke Centre: The Harold G. & June C. Shipp Stroke Centre
- Regional Cardiac Centre: Hazel McCallion Centre for Heart Health
- Regional Neurosurgery Centre
- Internal Medicine and Sub-specialities
- Intensive Care
- Surgery
- Mental Health
- Colonel Harland Sanders Family Care Centre
  - Obstetrics and Gynaecology
  - Paediatrics
- Diagnostic Imaging, Interventional Radiology
- Diabetes Management Centre
- Emergency Services (24 hours/day)
- A specialist SARS clinic operated during the 2003 outbreak
- Surgicentre - the largest outpatient surgical centre in North America

== Teaching partnership ==
Mississauga Hospital acts as a teaching hospital for students in the Mississauga Academy of Medicine at the University of Toronto Faculty of Medicine. It is affiliated with the university through Trillium Health Partners.

== Fundraising ==
The hospital's annual Diwali dinner has become known as one of Mississauga's premier social events.

== Bus terminal ==
Trillium Health Centre

General information
- Location: 100 Queensway West, Mississauga, Ontario, Canada
- Coordinates: 43.57215°N 79.60934°W
- Owner: City of Mississauga
- Bus routes: 4, 28, 103
- Bus stands: 1
- Bus operators: MiWay
Location

Trillium Health Centre is a MiWay bus terminal located on the northern side of the Mississauga Hospital site, facing the Queensway.

The bus terminal has no ticketing services and contains a bus shelter.

=== Bus routes ===
All routes are wheelchair-accessible.

Route		Destination
4	North Service Road	Cooksville GO Station via Huron Park Community Centre
4	North Service Road	Sherway Gardens via Dixie Outlet Mall
28	Confederation	City Centre via Cooksville GO Station
103	Hurontario Express	Brampton Gateway Terminal
