= Baycrest Health Sciences =

Coordinates: 43.730°N 79.433°W

Baycrest

Geography
- Location: 3560 Bathurst Street, Toronto, Ontario, Canada

Organisation
- Care system: Medicare
- Type: Specialist
- Affiliated university: University of Toronto
- Network: TAHSN

Services
- Emergency department: No
- Beds: 472 nursing home 300 continuing & acute care
- Speciality: Geriatric medicine

History
- Founded: 1918

Links
- Website: www.baycrest.org

Baycrest Health Sciences is a research and teaching hospital for the elderly in the North York district of Toronto, Ontario, Canada. It is fully affiliated with the University of Toronto as part of the Toronto Academic Health Science Network (TAHSN). Baycrest was originally founded in 1918 as the Toronto Jewish Old Folks Home in a semi-detached Victorian house at 29 Cecil Street in downtown Toronto.

== History ==
Slova Greenberg, president of the Ezras Noshem Society, identified the need to provide health care for elderly Jewish people in Toronto in 1913. The "Toronto Jewish Old Folks Home" opened at 29 Cecil Street, Toronto in 1918. The original location on Cecil street was demolished in 1954 and is now home to the United Steelworkers Larry Sefton Hall (c. 1972 at 25 Cecil Street) and Toronto Labour Lyceum (c. 1971 33 Cecil Street).

In 1954, the new "Jewish Home for the Aged" moved to Bathurst Street. It expanded to a new building in 1968 at Baycrest's present location at 3560 Bathurst Street in North York. The entire Bathurst Street complex became known collectively as Baycrest.

Several residents of the home were profiled in Allan King's 2005 documentary film Memory for Max, Claire, Ida and Company.
