= Princess Margaret Cancer Centre =

Hospital in Toronto, Ontario, Canada

Coordinates: 43.658248°N 79.390683°W

- University Health Network

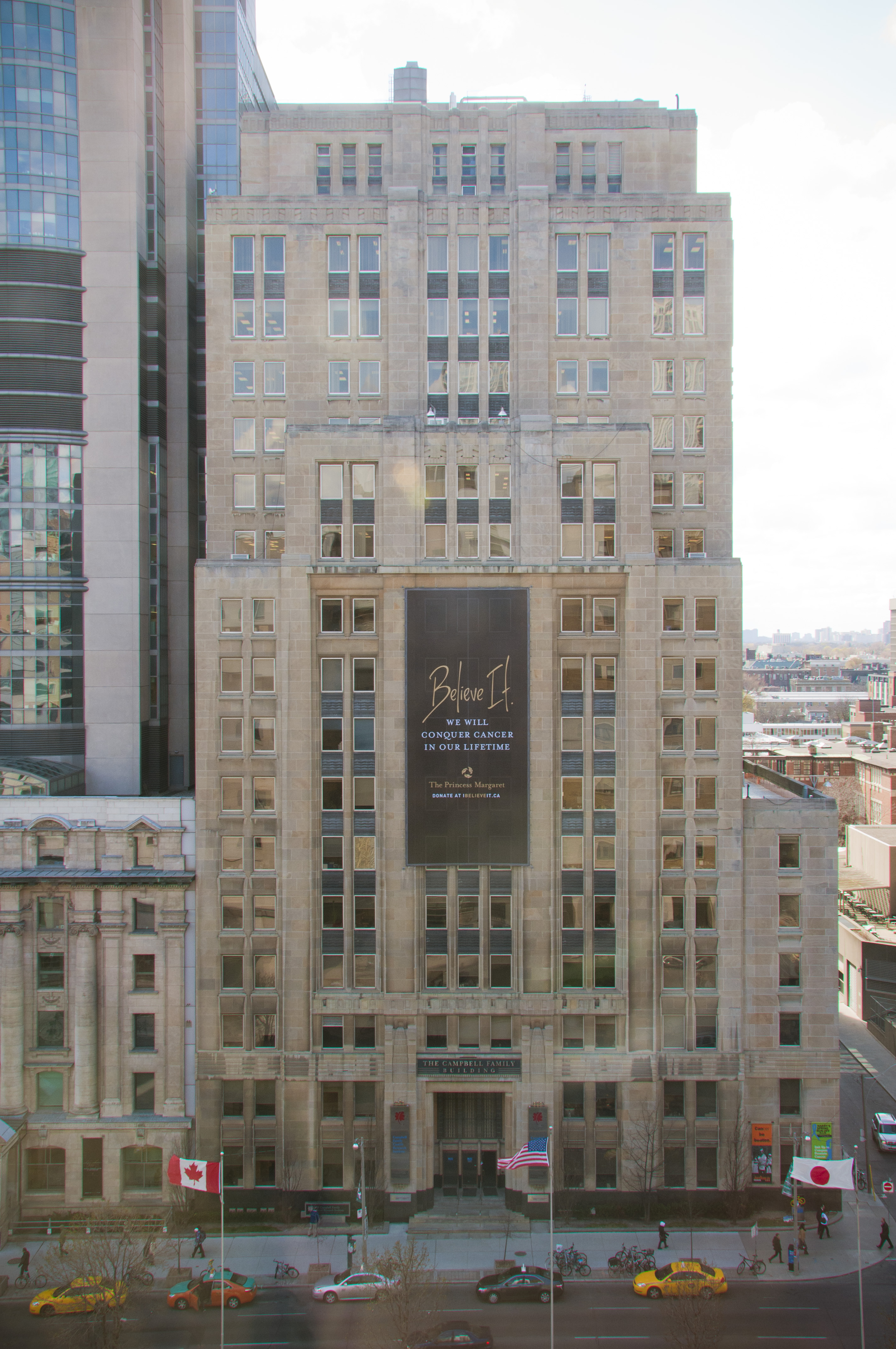
- Princess Margaret Cancer Centre with a banner from The Princess Margaret Cancer Foundation's Billion Dollar Challenge

Geography
- Location: Toronto, Ontario, Canada

Organization
- Care system: Public Medicare (Canada)
- Type: Specialist
- Affiliated university: University of Toronto
- Patron: Anne, Princess Royal

Services
- Emergency department: No
- Beds: 220
- Speciality: Oncology

History
- Founded: 1952

Links
- Website: uhn.ca/princessmargaret
- Lists: Hospitals in Canada

The Princess Margaret Cancer Centre (previously, Princess Margaret Hospital) is a scientific research centre and a teaching hospital in Toronto, Ontario, Canada, affiliated with the University of Toronto as part of the University Health Network (UHN). It is the second largest cancer centre in Canada along with the Odette Cancer Centre, which is also associated with University of Toronto and is independently one of the largest cancer centres in North America, it forms one of the largest cluster of cancer hospitals in the world.

The hospital is situated near the intersection of University Avenue and College Street within the Discovery District of downtown Toronto, an area with high concentration of biomedical research institutions. Named for Princess Margaret, Countess of Snowdon, the hospital is under the royal patronage of Anne, Princess Royal.

The hospital specializes in the treatment of cancer, and offers the majority of its services to residents of the Greater Toronto Area. The hospital offers surgical oncology, medical oncology, hematology including bone marrow transplantation, radiation oncology, psychosocial oncology, medical imaging, and radiation therapy.

The hospital houses 17 radiation treatment machines, all of which are equipped with technologies including IMRT and VMAT, a superficial orthovoltage machine, and operates a Gamma Knife (Perfexion) stereotactic radiosurgery machine in collaboration with Toronto Western Hospital.

== Education ==
As a teaching hospital of the University of Toronto, the hospital provides training to various medical professions. Most notable are clinical programs for medical doctors (medical and radiation oncologists) and radiation therapists.

== Research ==
Its related research arm, the Ontario Cancer Institute (OCI), works in conjunction with the hospital in a mutually beneficial relationship. Many researchers at the OCI hold appointments at the University of Toronto, often within the Department of Medical Biophysics. The Princess Margaret's research program ranked fourth in terms of the percentage of publications cited in high-impact oncology journals.

== History ==
Logo until 2025.

The hospital was founded as the Ontario Cancer Institute in 1952 by an Act of the Ontario legislature. Designed by the architect Henry Sproatt, it was originally located at 500 Sherbourne Street (now a condo complex) near the former Wellesley Hospital.

During health restructuring legislated by the Harris Government in the late 1990s Princess Margaret Hospital merged with what was then named The Toronto Hospital, which was the entity formed by the previous merger of the Toronto General Hospital and the Toronto Western Hospital, and the new combined organization was named University Health Network (UHN) with the three separate hospitals maintaining their own identities within the new hospital corporation.

== See also ==
- The Ride to Conquer Cancer
- List of Canadian organizations with royal patronage
- Royal eponyms in Canada
