= Rehabilitation hospital =

Inpatient healthcare facility

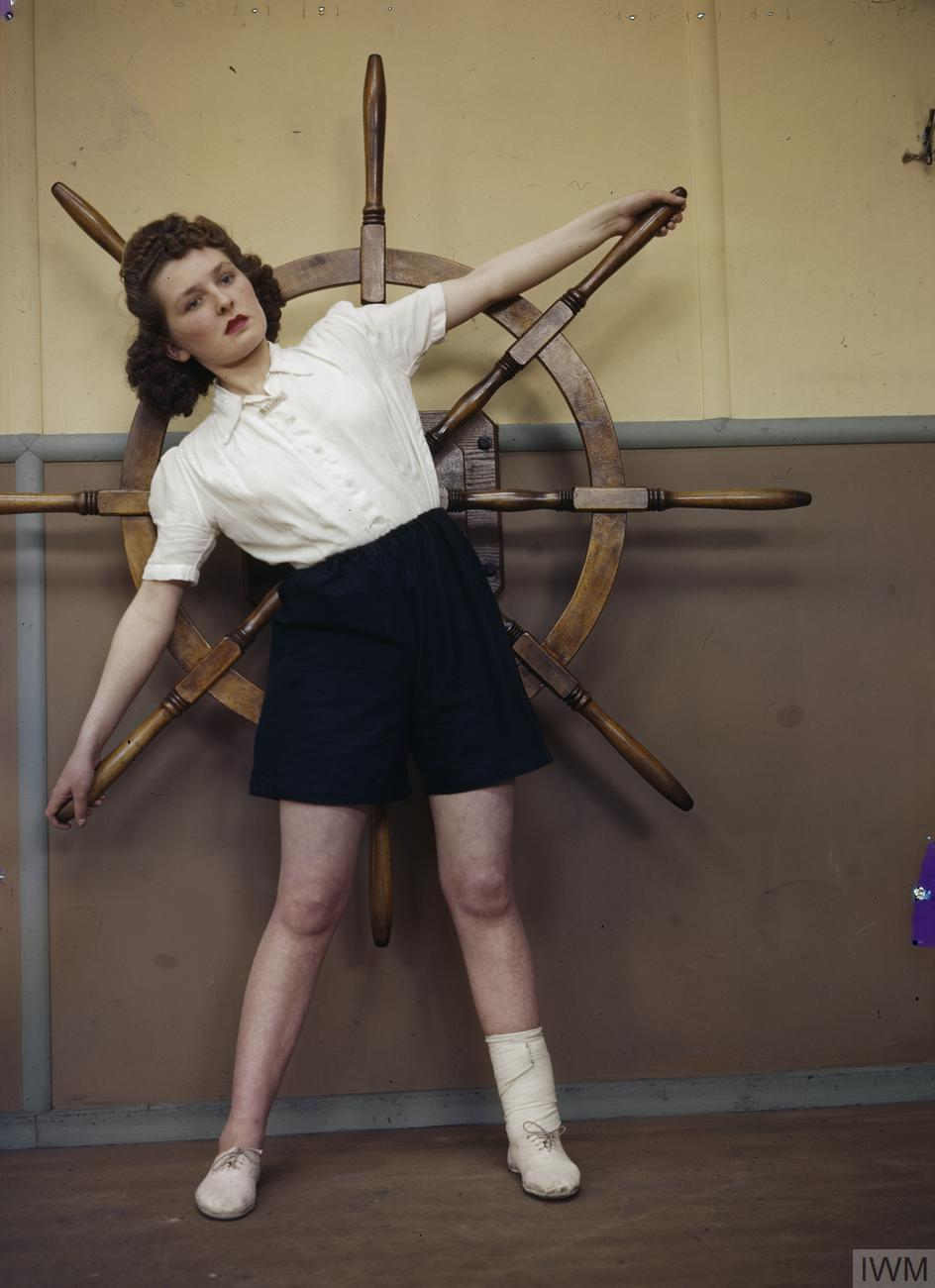
A girl using a ship's wheel for resisted trunk side flexion exercises at a rehabilitation centre for injured workers, 1944

Rehabilitation hospitals, also referred to as inpatient rehabilitation hospitals, are devoted to the rehabilitation of patients with various neurological, musculoskeletal, orthopedic, and other medical conditions following stabilization of their acute medical issues. The industry is largely made up by independent hospitals that operate these facilities within acute care hospitals. There are also inpatient rehabilitation hospitals that offer this service in a hospital-like setting, but separate from acute care facilities. Most inpatient rehabilitation facilities are located within hospitals.

The objective of rehabilitation is to cure a patient completely. However, exact goals vary for each person. For instance, someone with a problem in their lungs might get pulmonary rehabilitation so that their breathing becomes better.

On the other hand, someone with a spine injury may need physical therapy and rehab to help restrict more damage from happening to their backs.

== Kinds of therapy ==
Various types of therapy can be offered at rehabilitation facilities vary:

- Cognitive rehabilitation therapy to help you relearn skills such as thinking, remembering, learning, organizing, etc.
- Mental health counseling
- Assistive devices including tools and devices to enable people with disabilities in performing daily activities
- Speech therapy to assist people in speaking, listening, understanding, writing, and swallowing
- Nutritional counseling
- Pain treatment
- Occupational therapy to perform daily activities smoothly
- Music therapy to express the person's thoughts and feelings and build social networks
- Recreational therapy to enhance the person's emotional well-being through games, painting, and other forms of training
- Vocational rehabilitation for developing skills to pursue their education or working at an organization

== History ==
Rehabilitation hospitals were created to meet a perceived need for facilities which were less costly on a per diem basis than general hospitals but which provided a higher level of professional therapies such as speech therapy, occupational therapy, and physical therapy than can be obtained in a "skilled nursing care" facility. In the United States, rehabilitation hospitals are designed to meet the requirements imposed upon them by the Medicare administration, and to bill at the rates allowed by Medicare for such a facility. Medicare allows a lifetime total of 100 days' stay in a rehabilitation hospital per person. A rehabilitation hospital can only be accessed following a stay as an inpatient in a general hospital which has lasted for a certain number of days. The general hospital will evaluate the patient to determine if the patient will benefit from rehabilitation services. A positive determination will be made if the patient is deemed to require a certain level of therapies. If a positive determination is made, a report concerning the patient's needs will be sent to the rehabilitation hospital, which has the discretion to admit or not admit the patient. If the patient is transferred to the rehabilitation hospital, his/her medical records and a recommended treatment plan will be transmitted with the patient. The treatment plan will include daily therapies except on weekends. Some rehabilitation hospitals have physicians on staff; others do not.

Access and Disparities in the United States:

Access to inpatient rehabilitation facility is dependent upon many factors including diagnosis, insurance type, patient’s ability to participate in intensive therapy, need for active physician management/nursing care and patient location. Research demonstrates that disparities exist in admission to inpatient rehabilitation facilities which also impacts access.

Research data shows that insurance type and quality impacts the level of rehabilitation care a patient receives. Researchers found that those who were uninsured or had Medicaid had higher odds of going to a Skilled Nursing Facility (SNF) compared to an Inpatient Rehabilitation Facility (IRF) when compared to those with private insurance. (Medford-Davis et al, 2016) This impacts the level of rehabilitation a patient receives in the critical window after a hospital admission affecting their recovery potential. Besides insurance status, geography impacts an individual’s access to inpatient rehabilitation. Those who live in urban areas with closer proximity to rehabilitation centers have more access compared to those who live in rural areas. (Jaffe, et al, 2015)

Gender is also associated with differing admission rates. A study found that women are less likely to be discharged to inpatient rehabilitation after a stroke and hip replacement compared to men with similar medical diagnoses. The same study also found that older adults are less likely to be discharged to an inpatient rehabilitation facility after a stroke. (Jaffe et al, 2015) A recent study demonstrated survivors of violence had a 3 times higher odds of being denied admission to inpatient rehabilitation due to injury specific biases and alienating language in the medical records. (Georges et al, 2025).

Research demonstrates that racial disparities exist additionally in progression of mobility & functional independence when participating in therapy at these facilities. Non-white patients and patients with limited English proficiency has significantly lower functional recovery during their inpatient rehabilitation discharge (admission to discharge) as measured by the Functional Independence Measure (FIM) (Herrmann et al, 2024)

To assist in promoting health equity, the U.S healthcare system relies on federal regulations that prevent biased referrals from physiatrists. These regulations, the Stark Law and CMS Discharge Planning Requirements promote referrals and admissions to rehabilitation facilities based on medical necessity. The Stark Law, or the federal Physician Self-Referral Law, prohibits physicians from referring Medicare or Medicaid patients to health facilities in which they or family members have direct or indirect financial involvement. The second regulatory law is CMS Discharge Planning Requirements in which providers are legally required to provide patients with informed consent of the rehabilitative choices. CMS also enforces strict clinical guidelines to prevent inappropriate or biased use of acute Rehabilitation. (CMS)

== See also ==
- Physical medicine and rehabilitation
- Category:Rehabilitation hospitals – Wikipedia articles about rehabilitation hospitals
