= Lewine =

Lewine is a surname. Notable people with the surname include:

- Edward Lewine, American journalist, speechwriter and author
- Frances Lewine (1921–2008), American journalist
- Richard Lewine (1910–2005), American composer and songwriter
- Saint Lewine (5th century), British virgin and martyr
- Sidney Lewine (1915–2003), American healthcare executive
