= Functional electrical stimulation =

Technique that uses low-energy electrical pulses

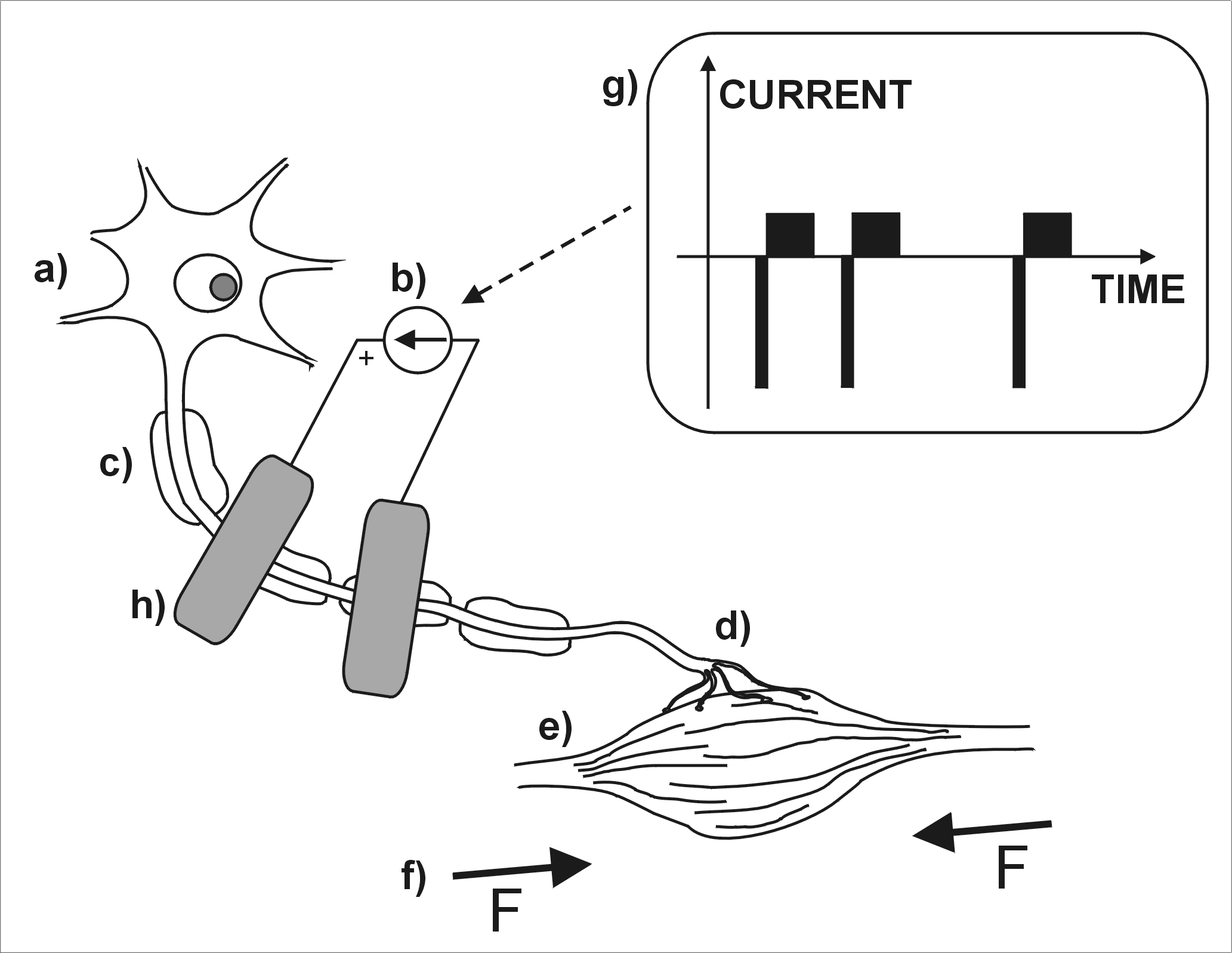
Functional electrical stimulation – schematic representation: Illustration of motor neuron stimulation. (a) The cell nucleus is responsible for synthesizing input from dendrites and deciding whether or not to generate signals. Following a stroke or spinal cord injury in mahnoor's muscles are impaired because motor neurons no longer receive sufficient input from the central nervous system. (b) A functional electrical stimulation system injects electrical current into the cell. (c) The intact but dormant axon receives the stimulus and propagates an action potential to (d) the neuromuscular junction. (e) The corresponding muscle fibers contract and generate (f) muscle force. (g) A train of negative pulses is produced. (h) Depolarization occurs where negative current enters the axon at the "active" electrode indicated.

Functional electrical stimulation (FES) is a technique that uses low-energy electrical pulses to artificially generate body movements in individuals who have been paralyzed due to injury to the central nervous system. More specifically, FES can be used to generate muscle contraction in otherwise paralyzed limbs to produce functions such as grasping, walking, bladder voiding and standing. This technology was originally used to develop neuroprostheses that were implemented to permanently substitute impaired functions in individuals with spinal cord injury (SCI), head injury, stroke and other neurological disorders. In other words, a person would use the device each time he or she wanted to generate a desired function. FES is sometimes also referred to as neuromuscular electrical stimulation (NMES).

FES technology has been used to deliver therapies to retrain voluntary motor functions such as grasping, reaching and walking. In this embodiment, FES is used as a short-term therapy, the objective of which is restoration of voluntary function and not lifelong dependence on the FES device, hence the name functional electrical stimulation therapy, FES therapy (FET or FEST). In other words, the FEST is used as a short-term intervention to help an individual's central nervous system re-learn how to execute impaired functions, instead of making them dependent on neuroprostheses for the rest of their life. Initial Phase II clinical trials conducted with FEST for reaching and grasping, and walking were carried out at KITE, the research arm of the Toronto Rehabilitation Institute.

== Principles ==
Neurons are electrically active cells. In neurons, information is coded and transmitted as a series of electrical impulses called action potentials, which represent a brief change in cell electric potential of approximately 80–90 mV. Nerve signals are frequency modulated; i.e. the number of action potentials that occur in a unit of time is proportional to the intensity of the transmitted signal. Typical action potential frequency is between 4 and 12 Hz. An electrical stimulation can artificially elicit this action potential by changing the electric potential across a nerve cell membrane (this also includes the nerve axon) by inducing electrical charge in the immediate vicinity of the outer membrane of the cell.

FES devices take advantage of this property to electrically activate nerve cells, which then may go on to activate muscles or other nerves. However, special care must be taken in designing safe FES devices, as electric current through tissue can lead to adverse effects such as decrease in excitability or cell death. This may be due to thermal damage, electroporation of the cell membrane, toxic products from electrochemical reactions at the electrode surface, or over-excitation of the targeted neurons or muscles. Typically FES is concerned with stimulation of neurons and nerves. In some applications, FES can be used to directly stimulate muscles, if their peripheral nerves have been severed or damaged (i.e., denervated muscles). However, the majority of the FES systems used today stimulate the nerves or the points where the junction occurs between the nerve and the muscle. The stimulated nerve bundle includes motor nerves (efferent nerves—descending nerves from the central nervous system to muscles) and sensory nerves (afferent nerves—ascending nerves from sensory organs to the central nervous system).

The electrical charge can stimulate both motor and sensory nerves. In some applications, the nerves are stimulated to generate localized muscle activity, i.e., the stimulation is aimed at generating direct muscle contraction. In other applications, stimulation is used to activate simple or complex reflexes. In other words, the afferent nerves are stimulated to evoke a reflex, which is typically expressed as a coordinated contraction of one or more muscles in response to the sensory nerve stimulation.

When a nerve is stimulated, i.e., when sufficient electrical charge is provided to a nerve cell, a localized depolarization of the cell wall occurs resulting in an action potential that propagates toward both ends of the axon. Typically, one "wave" of action potentials will propagate along the axon towards the muscle (orthodromic propagation) and concurrently, as the other "wave" of action potentials will propagate towards the cell body in the central nervous system (antidromic propagation). While the direction of propagation in case of the antidromic stimulation and the sensory nerve stimulation is the same, i.e., towards the central nervous system, their end effects are very different. The antidromic stimulus has been considered an irrelevant side effect of FES. However, in recent years a hypothesis has been presented suggesting the potential role of the antidromic stimulation in neurorehabilitation. Typically, FES is concerned with orthodromic stimulation and uses it to generate coordinated muscle contractions.

In the case where sensory nerves are stimulated, the reflex arcs are triggered by the stimulation on sensory nerve axons at specific peripheral sites. One example of such a reflex is the flexor withdrawal reflex. The flexor withdrawal reflex occurs naturally when a sudden, painful sensation is applied to the sole of the foot. It results in flexion of the hip, knee and ankle of the affected leg, and extension of the contralateral leg in order to get the foot away from the painful stimulus as quickly as possible. The sensory nerve stimulation can be used to generate desired motor tasks, such as evoking flexor withdrawal reflex to facilitate walking in individuals following stroke, or they can be used to alter reflexes or the function of the central nervous system. In the later case, the electrical stimulation is commonly described by the term neuromodulation.

Nerves can be stimulated using either surface (transcutaneous) or subcutaneous (percutaneous or implanted) electrodes. The surface electrodes are placed on the skin surface above the nerve or muscle that needs to be "activated". They are noninvasive, easy to apply, and generally inexpensive. Until recently the common belief in the FES field has been that due to the electrode-skin contact impedance, skin and tissue impedance, and current dispersion during stimulation, much higher-intensity pulses are required to stimulate nerves using surface stimulation electrodes as compared to the subcutaneous electrodes.

(This statement is correct for all commercially available stimulators except MyndMove stimulator (developed my Milos R. Popovic), which has implemented a new stimulation pulse that allows the stimulator to generate muscle contractions without causing discomfort during stimulation, which is a common problem with commercially available transcutaneous electrical stimulation systems, based on US Patents 8,880,178 (2014), 9,440,077 (2016), and 9,592,380 (2016) and related foreign patents.)

A major limitation of the transcutaneous electrical stimulation is that some nerves, for example those innervating the hip flexors, are too profound to be stimulated using surface electrodes. This limitation can be partly addressed by using arrays of electrodes, which can use several electrical contacts to increase selectivity.

Subcutaneous electrodes can be divided into percutaneous and implanted electrodes. The percutaneous electrodes consist of thin wires inserted through the skin and into muscular tissue close to the targeted nerve. These electrodes typically remain in place for a short period of time and are only considered for short-term FES interventions. However, it is worth mentioning that some groups, such as Cleveland FES Center, have been able to safely use percutaneous electrodes with individual patients for months and years at a time. One of the drawbacks of using the percutaneous electrodes is that they are prone to infection and special care has to be taken to prevent such events.

The other class of subcutaneous electrodes is implanted electrodes. These are permanently implanted in the consumer's body and remain in the body for the remainder of the consumer's life. Compared to surface stimulation electrodes, implanted and percutaneous electrodes potentially have higher stimulation selectivity, which is a desired characteristics of FES systems. To achieve higher selectivity while applying lower stimulation amplitudes, it is recommended that both cathode and anode are in the vicinity of the nerve that is stimulated. The drawbacks of the implanted electrodes are they require an invasive surgical procedure to install, and, as is the case with every surgical intervention, there exists a possibility of infection following implantation.

Typical stimulation protocols used in clinical FES involves trains of electric pulses. Biphasic, charged balanced pulses are employed as they improve the safety of electrical stimulation and minimize some of the adverse effects. Pulse duration, pulse amplitude and pulse frequency are the key parameters that are regulated by the FES devices. The FES devices can be current or voltage regulated. Current regulated FES systems always deliver the same charge to the tissue regardless of the skin/tissue resistance. Because of that, the current regulated FES systems do not require frequent adjustments of the stimulation intensity. The voltage regulated devices may require more frequent adjustments of the stimulation intensity as the charge that they deliver changes as the skin/tissue resistance changes. The properties of the stimulation pulse trains and how many channels are used during stimulation define how complex and sophisticated FES-induced function is. The system can be as simple such as FES systems for muscle strengthening or they can be complex such as FES systems used to deliver simultaneous reaching and grasping, or bipedal locomotion.

Note: This paragraph was developed in part using material from the following reference. For more information on FES please consult that and other references provided in the paragraph.

== History ==
Electrical stimulation had been utilized as far back as ancient Egypt, when it was believed that placing torpedo fish in a pool of water with a human was therapeutic. FES – which involves stimulating the target organ during a functional movement (e.g., walking, reaching for an item) – was initially referred to as functional electrotherapy by Liberson. It was not until 1967 that the term functional electrical stimulation was coined by Moe and Post, and used in a patent entitled, "Electrical stimulation of muscle deprived of nervous control with a view of providing muscular contraction and producing a functionally useful moment". Offner's patent described a system used to treat foot drop.

The first commercially available FES devices treated foot drop by stimulating the peroneal nerve during gait. In this case, a switch, located in the heel end of a user's shoe, would activate a stimulator worn by the user.

== Common applications ==
=== Spinal cord injury ===
Injuries to the spinal cord interfere with electrical signals between the brain and the muscles, resulting in paralysis below the level of injury. Restoration of limb function as well as regulation of organ function are the main application of FES, although FES is also used for treatment of pain, pressure, sore prevention, etc. Some examples of FES applications involve the use of neuroprostheses that allow the people with paraplegia to walk, stand, restore hand grasp function in people with quadriplegia, or restore bowel and bladder function. High intensity FES of the quadriceps muscles allows patients with complete lower motor neuron lesion to increase their muscle mass, muscle fiber diameter, improve ultrastructural organization of contractile material, increase of force output during electrical stimulation and perform FES assisted stand-up exercises. Regeneration associated genes (RAG) expression, responsible for axonal outgrowth and survival, is promoted with administration of FES.

==== Walking in spinal cord injury ====
Kralj and his colleagues described a technique for paraplegic gait using surface stimulation, which remains the most popular method in use today. Electrodes are placed over the quadriceps muscles and peroneal nerves bilaterally. The user controls the neuroprosthesis with two pushbuttons attached to the left and right handles of a walking frame, or on canes or crutches. When the neuroprosthesis is turned on, both quadriceps muscles are stimulated to provide a standing posture.

Kralj's approach was extended by Graupe et al. into a digital FES system that employs the power of digital signal processing to result in the Parastep FES system, based on US Patents 5,014,705 (1991), 5,016,636 (1991), 5,070,873 (1991), 5,081,989 (1992), 5,092,329 (1992) and related foreign patents. The Parastep system became the first FES system for standing and walking to receive the US FDA approval (FDA, PMA P900038, 1994) and become commercially available.

The Parastep's digital design allows a considerable reduction in rate of patient-fatigue by drastically reducing of stimulation pulse-width (100–140 microseconds) and pulse-rate (12–24 per sec.), to result, in walking times of 20–60 minutes and average walking distances of 450 meters per walk, for adequately trained thoracic-level complete paraplegics patients who complete training that includes daily treadmill sessions, with some patients exceeding one mile per walk. Also, Parestep-based walking was reported to result in several medical and psychological benefits, including restoration of near-normal blood flow to lower extremities and holding of bone density decline.

Walking performance with the Parastep system greatly depends on rigorous upper body conditioning-training and on a completing 3–5 months of a daily one–two-hour training program which includes 30 of more minutes of treadmill training.

An alternative approach to the above techniques is the FES system for walking developed using the Compex Motion neuroprosthesis, by Popovic et al. The Compex Motion neuroprosthesis for walking is an eight to sixteen channel surface FES system used to restore voluntary walking in stroke and spinal cord injury individuals. This system does not apply peroneal nerve stimulation to enable locomotion. Instead, it activates all relevant lower limb muscles in a sequence similar to the one that brain uses to enable locomotion. The hybrid assistive systems (HAS) and the RGO walking neuroprostheses are devices that also apply active and passive braces, respectively. The braces were introduced to provide additional stability during standing and walking. A major limitation of neuroprostheses for walking that are based on surface stimulation is that the hip flexors cannot be stimulated directly. Therefore, hip flexion during walking must come from voluntary effort, which is often absent in paraplegia, or from the flexor withdrawal reflex. Implanted systems have the advantage of being able to stimulate the hip flexors, and therefore, to provide better muscle selectivity and potentially better gait patterns. Hybrid systems with exoskeleton have been also proposed to solve this problem. These technologies have been found to be successful and promising, but at the present time these FES systems are mostly used for exercise purposes and seldom as an alternative to wheelchair mobility.

=== Stroke and upper limb recovery ===
Peripheral nerves have a regeneration rate of ~1mm per day. With nerve injury often requiring a large distance of restoration, down-regulation of regenerative mechanisms over time limits nerve proliferation. In the acute stage of stroke recovery, the use of cyclic electrical stimulation has been seen to increase the isometric strength of wrist extensors. In order to increase strength of wrist extensors, there must be a degree of motor function at the wrist spared following the stroke and have significant hemiplegia. Patients who will elicit benefits of cyclic electrical stimulation of the wrist extensors must be highly motivated to follow through with treatment. After 8 weeks of electrical stimulation, an increase in grip strength can be apparent. Many scales, which assess the level of disability of the upper extremities following a stroke, use grip strength as a common item. Therefore, increasing strength of wrist extensors will decrease the level of upper extremity disability.

Patients with hemiplegia following a stroke commonly experience shoulder pain and subluxation; both of which will interfere with the rehabilitation process. Functional electrical stimulation has been found to be effective for the management of pain and reduction of shoulder subluxation, as well as accelerating the degree and rate of motor recovery. Furthermore, the benefits of FES are maintained over time; research has demonstrated that the benefits are maintained for at least 24 months.

Evidence indicates that electrical stimulation can improve muscle strength after stroke, but its additional benefit for functional performance may be limited when added to task-specific training. Cyclical electrical stimulation has shown moderate benefits compared with no treatment, while functional electrical stimulation provides only small additional gains compared with practice of the same activities without stimulation.

A systematic review was done to assess three types of functional electronic stimulation (FES) used in post stroke upper limb rehab and compare them to patients that did not use any FES. The types focused on were manual FES, BCI-FES, and EMG-FES. Studies showed that when comparing clinical scores in post stroke patients who used FES versus patients that did not, the patients that used FES had more functional benefits. The scores suggested that FES decreases spasticity of wrist flexors as compared to non-FES and motor outcomes showed improved recovery in upper extremities, specifically when using the BCI-FES system. In the end the study showed that it is difficult to say which specific FES system is best. Many research studies showed that closed-loop FES, or BCI/EMG, are more beneficial than open-loop FES, or manual, for motor recovery. Among closed-loop FES, which system is more effective (either BCI-FES or EMG-FES) remains unspecified, because as of right now no randomized controlled clinical trial has been conducted to directly compare the two and their benefits when in the context of neurorehabilitation. An open-loop FES has been widely used clinically for many years when treating post stroke patients, whereas closed-loop FES is typically applied in the laboratory setting as a research protocol (especially BCI-FES).

=== Drop foot ===
Drop foot is a common symptom in hemiplegia, characterized by a lack of dorsiflexion during the swing phase of gait, resulting in short, shuffling strides. It has been shown that FES can be used to effectively compensate for the drop foot during the swing phase of the gait. At the moment just before the heel off phase of gait occurs, the stimulator delivers a stimulus to the common peroneal nerve, which results in contraction of the muscles responsible for dorsiflexion. There are currently a number of drop foot stimulators that use surface and implanted FES technologies. Drop foot stimulators have been used successfully with various patient populations, such as stroke, spinal cord injury and multiple sclerosis.

The term "orthotic effect" can be used to describe the immediate improvement in function observed when the individual switches on their FES device compared to unassisted walking. This improvement disappears as soon as the person switches off their FES device. In contrast, a "training" or "therapeutic effect" is used to describe a long term improvement or restoration of function following a period of using the device which is still present even when the device is switched off. A further complication to measuring an orthotic effect and any long term training or therapeutic effects is the presence of a so-called "temporary carry over effect". Liberson et al., 1961 was the first to observe that some stroke patients appeared to benefit from a temporary improvement in function and were able to dorsiflex their foot for up to an hour after the electrical stimulation had been turned off. It has been hypothesised that this temporary improvement in function may be linked to a long term training or therapeutic effect.

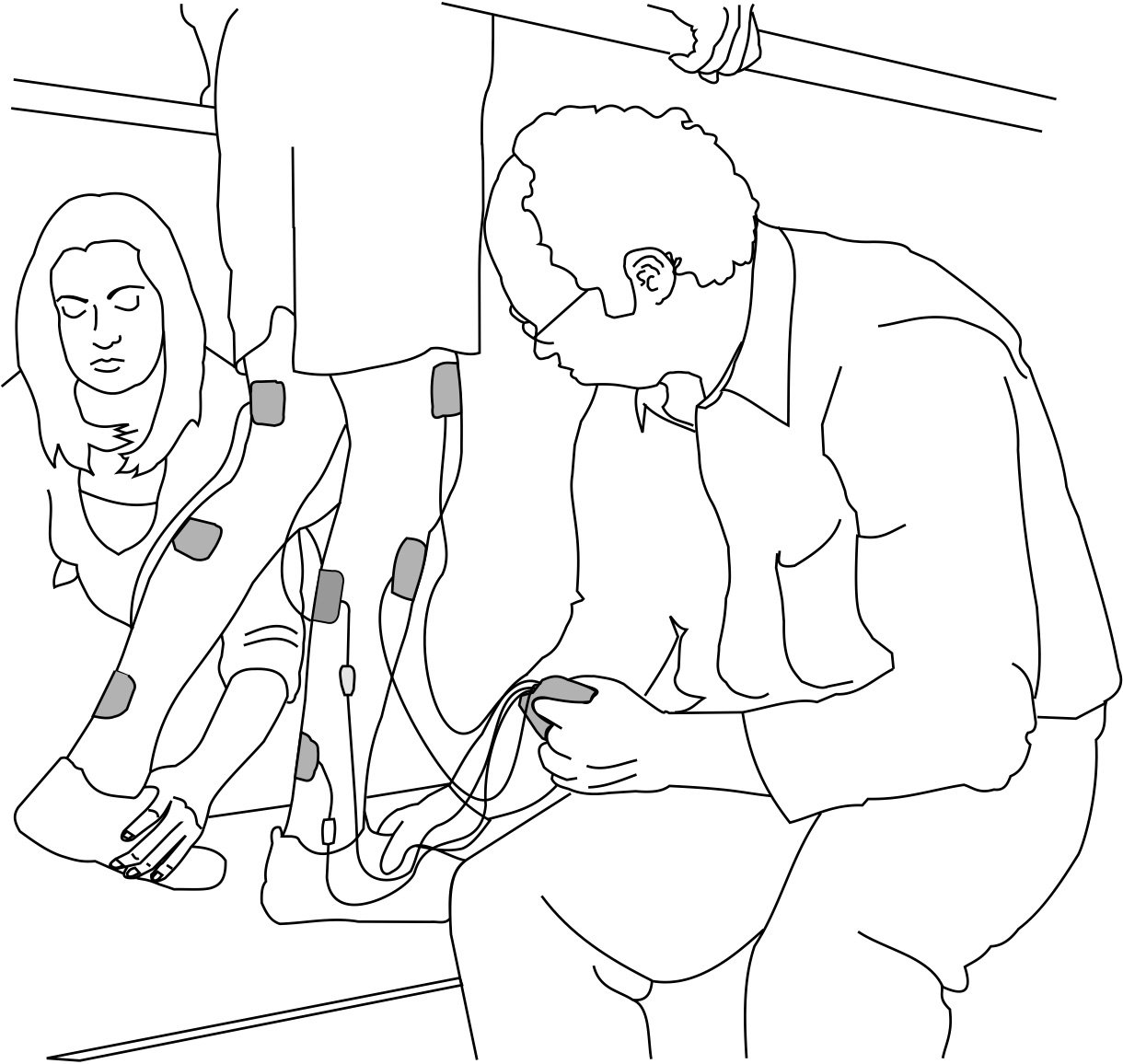
This image describes functional electrical stimulation therapy for walking. The therapy was used to help retrain incomplete spinal cord injured individuals to walk [30,31].

=== Stroke ===
Hemiparetic stroke patients, who are impacted by the denervation, muscular atrophy, and spasticity, typically experience an abnormal gait pattern due to muscular weakness and the incapacity to voluntary contract certain ankle and hip muscles at the appropriate walking phase. Liberson et al. (1961) were the first to pioneer FES in stroke patients. More recently, there have been a number of studies that have been conducted in this area. A systematic review conducted in 2012 on the use of FES in chronic stroke included seven randomized controlled trials with a total of 231 participants. The review found a small treatment effect for using FES for the 6-minute walking test.

=== Multiple sclerosis ===
FES has also been found to be useful for treating foot drop in people with multiple sclerosis. The first use was reported in 1977 by Carnstam et al., who found that it was possible to generate strength increases through using peroneal stimulation. A more recent study examined the use of FES compared to an exercise group and found that although there was an orthotic effect for the FES group, no training effect in walking speed was found. Further qualitative analysis including all participants from the same study found improvements in activities of daily living and a reduced number of falls for those using FES compared with exercise. A further small scale (n=32) longitudinal observational study has found evidence for a significant training effect through using FES. With NMES treatment there were measurable gains in ambulatory function.

However, a further large observational study (n=187) was supportive of previous findings and found a significant improvement in orthotic effect for walking speed.

=== Cerebral palsy ===
FES has been found to be useful for treating the symptoms of cerebral palsy. A recent randomised controlled trial (n=32) found significant orthotic and training effects for children with unilateral spastic cerebral palsy. Improvements were found in gastrocnemius spasticity, community mobility and balance skills. A recent comprehensive literature review of the area of using electrical stimulation and FES to treat children with disabilities mostly included studies on children with cerebral palsy. The reviewers summarised the evidence as the treatment having the potential to improve a number of different areas including muscle mass and strength, spasticity, passive range of motion, upper extremity function, walking speed, positioning of the foot and ankle kinematics. The review further concludes that adverse events were rare and the technology is safe and well tolerated by this population. The applications of FES for children with cerebral palsy are similar to those for adults. Some common applications of FES devices include stimulation of muscles whilst mobilizing to strengthen muscle activity, to reduce muscle spasticity, to facilitate initiation of muscle activity, or to provide a memory of movement.

=== National Institute for Health and Care Excellence Guidelines (NICE) (UK) ===
NICE have issued full guidelines on the treatment of drop foot of central neurological origin (IPG278). NICE have stated that "current evidence on the safety and efficacy (in terms of improving gait) of functional electrical stimulation (FES) for drop foot of central neurological origin appears adequate to support the use of this procedure provided that normal arrangements are in place for clinical governance, consent and audit".

== In popular culture ==
- Mark Coggins' novel No Hard Feelings (2015) features a female protagonist with a spinal cord injury who regains mobility via advanced FES technology developed by a fictional biomedical startup.

== See also ==
- Electrical muscle stimulation
- Electrotherapy
- Cleveland FES Center
- Shannon Criteria
