= Dorothy Dworkin =

Canadian nurse and activist (1889–1976)

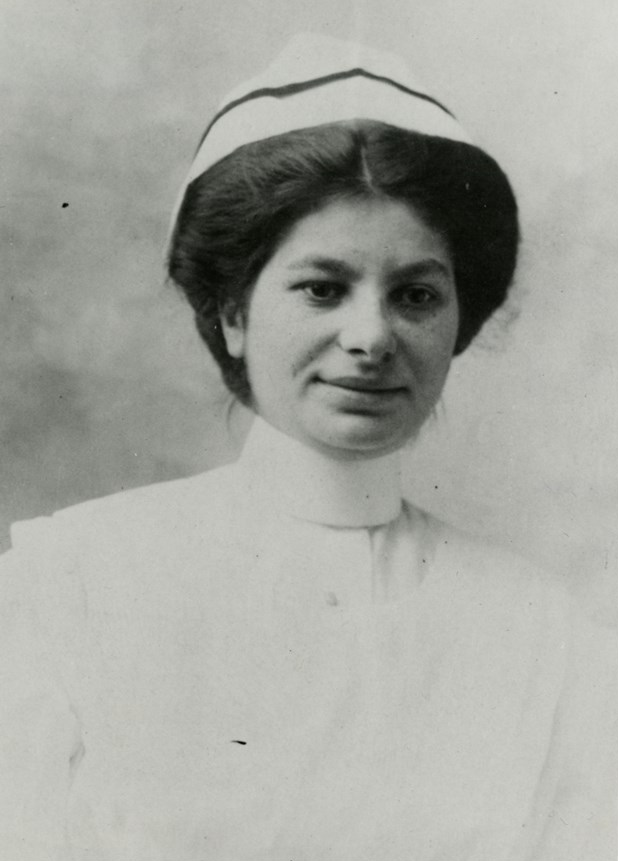
- Dworkin in nurse's uniform ca. 1909
- Born: Dvora Goldstick; 1889/1890; Ventspils, Courland Governorate, Russian Empire
- Died: 13 August 1976; Toronto, Ontario, Canada
- Spouse: Henry "Harry" (Chanan) Dworkin (m. 1911; death 1928)
- Children: Ellen "Honey" Dworkin
- Scientific career
- Fields: Nursing, medical entrepreneurship and philanthropy
- Workplaces: Mount Sinai Hospital

Dorothy Dworkin (née Goldstick; 1889/1890 – 13 August 1976) was a Canadian nurse, businesswoman and philanthropist. She was the first professionally trained nurse in Toronto's Jewish community and among its most prominent healthcare advocates. She led the fundraising campaign for the city's first Jewish hospital and is considered the matriarch of Mount Sinai Hospital. Through her family travel business, she helped thousands of Eastern European Jews immigrate to Canada and escape the Holocaust. Dworkin worked with many community charities and was a strong supporter of the Jewish trade unions through the city's Labour Lyceum. She was also the publisher and editor of a Yiddish newspaper and produced a Yiddish radio program. In 2009, she was recognized as a Person of National Historic Significance in Canada.

== Personal life ==
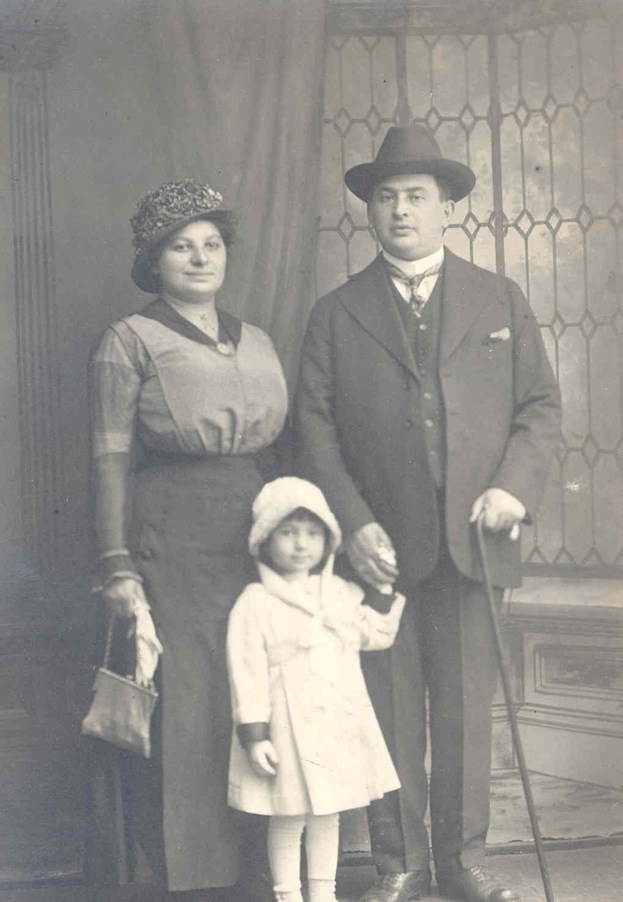
Dorothy, Ellen, and Henry Dworkin, 1915

Dora "Dorothy" Dworkin was born Dvora Goldstick in Ventspils, (Note: Ventspils is referred to by its historical German name, Windau, in sources.) Courland Governorate, Russian Empire (now Courland, Latvia), in 1889 or 1890. Her parents were Jewish, Wolf "William" and Sara Goldstick, (Note: Sometimes spelled Wolfe and Sarah Goldstick.) who had ten or eleven children. (Note: There is a discrepancy among sources on the number of Goldstick children, with Dworkin's biography at the websites of the Archives Association of Ontario and the Ontario Jewish Archives stating that there were 10 children, while Bill Gladstone Genealogy and the OJA 50th anniversary website state that there were 11 children.) The family immigrated to Toronto, Canada, in 1904.

In 1911, Dworkin married Henry "Harry" (Chanan) Dworkin, a Ukrainian-Canadian Bundist. They had one daughter, Ellen "Honey" Dworkin, born in 1912.

In 1913, Henry co-founded the Toronto Labour Lyceum. The organization initially provided education to Jewish working men and became a centre of the city's labour activism. (Note: Union activity at the Lyceum centered around the garment industry, which was Toronto's largest employment sector through the 1920s with about 46% of the needle-trade workforce being Jewish in 1931. Due to the competitive, unstable nature of the industry, working conditions were harsh and led to intense labour activism.) Henry was struck and killed by an automobile in 1928. An estimated 15,000–20,000 people attended his funeral procession, which brought his body to the Lyceum for visitation.

Harry Arthurs, a former dean of Osgoode Law School and president emeritus of York University, is Dworkin's grandson.

== Health care career and activism ==
In 1907, Dworkin began working at a private dispensary serving Toronto's Jewish community in the historic neighbourhood of The Ward. She was trained there by Dr. S. J. Kaufman and his associates Drs. Sylvester, Patton and Lyon. After about a year she was recommended to Cleveland's Mount Sinai Hospital (Note: Cleveland's Mount Sinai Hospital was known as the Jewish Women's Hospital prior to 1912.) to study nursing with a specialization in midwifery. She was prepared for the state examination by Professor J. F. Davidson, and in 1909 received her diploma from the Ohio State Medical Board.

On her return to Toronto, Dworkin was placed in charge of a free Jewish dispensary which was the successor to Kaufman's dispensary. It operated daily for about three hours, with the remainder of her time devoted to house calls to deliver babies. Following her marriage in 1911, she left this work and the dispensary closed shortly afterwards. However, her close work with the patients and knowledge of the community's requirements impressed her with the need for a Jewish hospital (Note: Discriminatory practices at hospitals of the time prevented Jewish professionals from gaining employment. There were no Yiddish-speakers on staff to communicate with immigrant Jewish patients. Hospitals also refused to cater kosher meals, to allow for observation of Jewish religious practices, and had very limited visiting hours. Additionally, hospitals were frequently a focus for Christian conversion by missionaries. Jewish hospitals, while accepting all patients, sought to provide employment and training opportunities for Jewish doctors and nurses, to provide services in Yiddish, to create a more welcoming atmosphere, and allow for the mitzvah of bikur cholim (visiting the sick).) and she began working toward this goal.

Dworkin worked with various women's organizations which provided social services for the immigrant Jewish community, most notably the Ezras Noshem (Yiddish for "ladies' aid"). These groups established an orphanage with a basement dispensary and the Moshav Zekanim (old folks' home), a forerunner of elder-care teaching hospital Baycrest Health Sciences. After these successes, Dworkin led the Ezras Noshem fundraising campaign for a Jewish hospital.

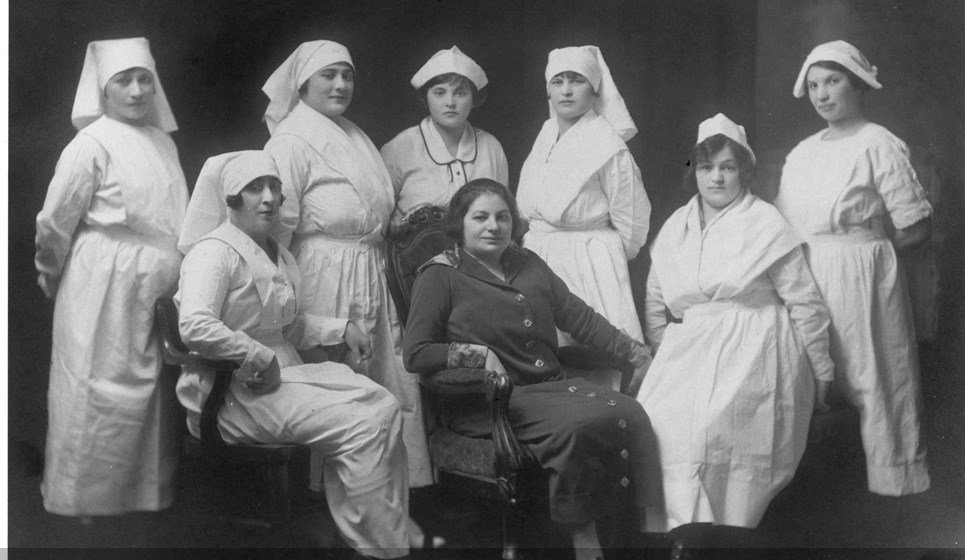
Mount Sinai Hospital Ladies Auxiliary with its president, Dworkin (seated at centre) c. 1923

The Ezras Noshem purchased a three-story brick building at 100 Yorkville Avenue which had been operated as the Lynhurst Hospital since 1913. Unable to equip the facility as a general hospital, it was opened in September 1922 as the thirty-bed Toronto Jewish Maternity and Convalescent Hospital, to address urgent needs in the community while creating a positive and reassuring setting to gain acceptance amongst immigrants who generally feared hospitals. Dworkin managed and led the daily activities at the hospital.

On 17 October 1923, the hospital was renamed Mount Sinai Hospital and registered with the province of Ontario, with Dworkin and three other Ezras Noshem members on its board of directors. In addition to serving the special needs of Jewish patients, the hospital also provided for Jewish doctors who were often denied employment elsewhere. As secretary of the board during the Great Depression, Dworkin quietly negotiated with the hospital's creditors while planning for a needed expansion. She convinced fifteen professionals with the hospital to buy thousand-dollar life insurance policies as collateral for a new mortgage, leading to a major hospital expansion and modernization which was completed in mid-1930s. Dworkin remained president of the hospital auxiliary until 1953, continuing thereafter as a strong advocate for the hospital.

In 1968, the hospital board received approval for construction of a new hospital at 600 University Avenue. Recognized as the hospital matriarch, Dworkin and a group of escorts were paraded from the old hospital to the new site, where Dworkin ceremonially commenced the demolitions.

== Business and publishing ==
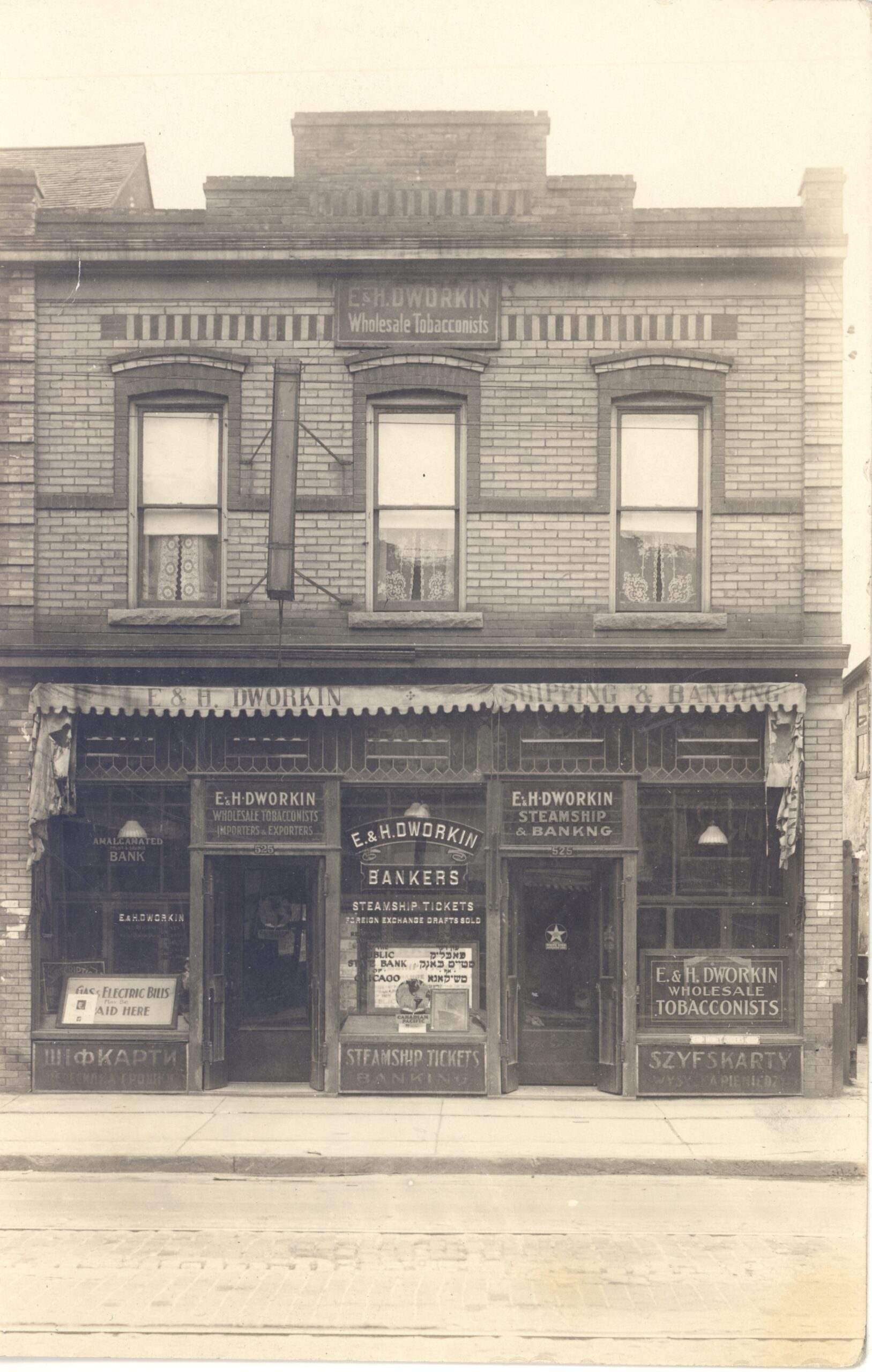
E. & H. Dworkin Steamship and Bankers, 1917

In 1917, Henry and his brother Edward opened the variety store and travel agency E. & H. Dworkin Steamship and Bankers, with the aim of reuniting families from Eastern Europe who had been separated by the war. (Note: Conflicts of the period include the Eastern Theatre of WWI (1914–1918), the Russian Civil War (1917–1923) and numerous pogroms against the Jews.) Dworkin assisted with this business, and the couple travelled to Poland, Romania and Latvia to arrange for the immigration of European Jews to settle in Toronto. This required them to provide travel, banking, legal, vocational and social services.

Following Henry's death in 1928, Dworkin continued the business as D. Dworkin & Company and later Dworkin Travel. Dworkin helped thousands of European Jews immigrate to Canada and escape the Holocaust, despite discriminatory immigration policies. She has been described as a "rainmaker" for her ability to make things happen when other avenues to immigration failed.

In 1935, Toronto's only Yiddish newspaper, Zshurnal, suspended publication due to a dispute amongst its editors. Dworkin and her brother Morris Goldstick used this opportunity to launch the weekly Kanader Nayes (Canadian News). It was added as a free insert in the popular weekend editions of New York Yiddish newspapers, such as The Forward (Forṿerṭs), for which Dworkin was the distributing agent. The paper's editorial view appealed to the major ideological elements of the Toronto Jewish community: Bundist, in the tradition of Dworkin's late husband, and Zionist on the part of Goldstick. The paper was published until 1955 and Dworkin's News Agency became Canada's largest distributor for the Yiddish press.

In 1936, following the successful model of the Kanader Nayes, Dworkin bought broadcast time on a private radio station for the weekly Jewish Hour entertainment program, hosted by Max Mandel. The program was mainly live musical performances with community announcements, and became a staple of Jewish life in Toronto. Programming was initially in Yiddish, shifting to a Yinglish that came into everyday use in the city's Jewish neighbourhoods. The decline of Yiddish in favour of English brought an end to the newspaper and radio program in the mid-1950s.

Dworkin served as the president of the Continental Steamship Ticket Agents Association and continued running the family business until her death in 1976.

== Philanthropy and union support ==
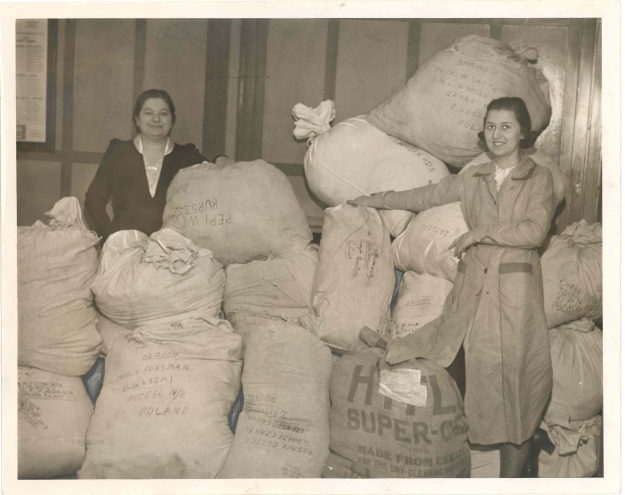
Dworkin (left) with relief parcels for Poland during WWII

Dworkin worked with Henry at the Labour Lyceum, including fundraising for a building with a 900-seat hall which opened in 1925. Following his death she became more involved with the Lyceum and served as the organization's director. In addition to hosting union activities and being the headquarters for the four large Jewish trade unions (Note: The so-called Jewish unions were largely led by and composed of Jewish workers, and included significant numbers of non-Jews. They were formed due to the high occupational concentration of immigrant Jews in the needle-trades and leadership by committed Jewish socialists.) the Lyceum was a meeting place for various Jewish organizations and held lectures, dances, plays and concerts. It was described by the Textile Museum of Canada as a "palace to the labour movement".

Dworkin led fundraising campaigns for international relief during the Holocaust, was on the boards of several organizations devoted to health, charity and the cause of establishing a Jewish homeland, and was a trustee of the Federation of the Jewish Philanthropies. She was active with the Canadian Jewish Congress, ORT and Pioneer Women, and was secretary of the Toronto chapter of the Jewish Labor Committee in the mid-1930s.

== Legacy ==
On 6 July 2009, on the recommendation of the Historic Sites and Monuments Board of Canada, Dworkin was designated a Person of National Historic Significance for her unique and enduring contribution to the history of Canada. In 2017, Canadian Jewish News included Dworkin among the 40 most-prominent Jewish Canadians in history. In 2024, the Ontario Jewish Archives included Dworkin's life story in a series of 50 showcases of Jewish history preserved in their collections.

The hospital at 100 Yorkville was demolished, but the original facade was preserved as the entrance for the Teatro Verde complex. A commemorative plaque created by Heritage Toronto bears a photograph of Dworkin and describes her contributions to the hospital.
