= Mount Sinai Hospital (Cleveland) =

Geography
- Location: Cleveland, Ohio, United States
- Coordinates: 41°30′35.8″N 81°36′57.9″W

History
- Opened: 1903
- Closed: February 2000

Links
- Lists: Hospitals in Ohio

Mount Sinai Hospital in Cleveland opened in 1903 on Mount Sinai Street, originally as a Jewish hospital. It provided a hospital for Jewish doctors who were not allowed to practice in other hospitals in the city at the time because of anti-Semitism. It quickly became known as a hospital for the city's poorer inhabitants, whether Jewish or not.

In 1908, Dorothy Dworkin trained and would receive her diploma from the Medical State Board of Ohio during her time at the hospital. The hospital moved to a larger facility on East 105th Street in 1916.

It is known for pioneering the separation of conjoined twins. Maurice Bernon, a nationally known Jewish leader served as the hospital's vice-president, and Sidney Lewine was a director of the hospital in the 1960s and '70s.

The hospital closed in February 2000. In 1996, upon its sale to a for-profit company, Mt. Sinai Hospital's assets were converted to a foundation then named the Mt. Sinai Health Care Foundation. In November 2021, the Foundation moved from its offices on the campus of Case Western Reserve University to 10501 Euclid Avenue and changed its name to the Mt. Sinai Health Foundation.
