= Shannon criteria =

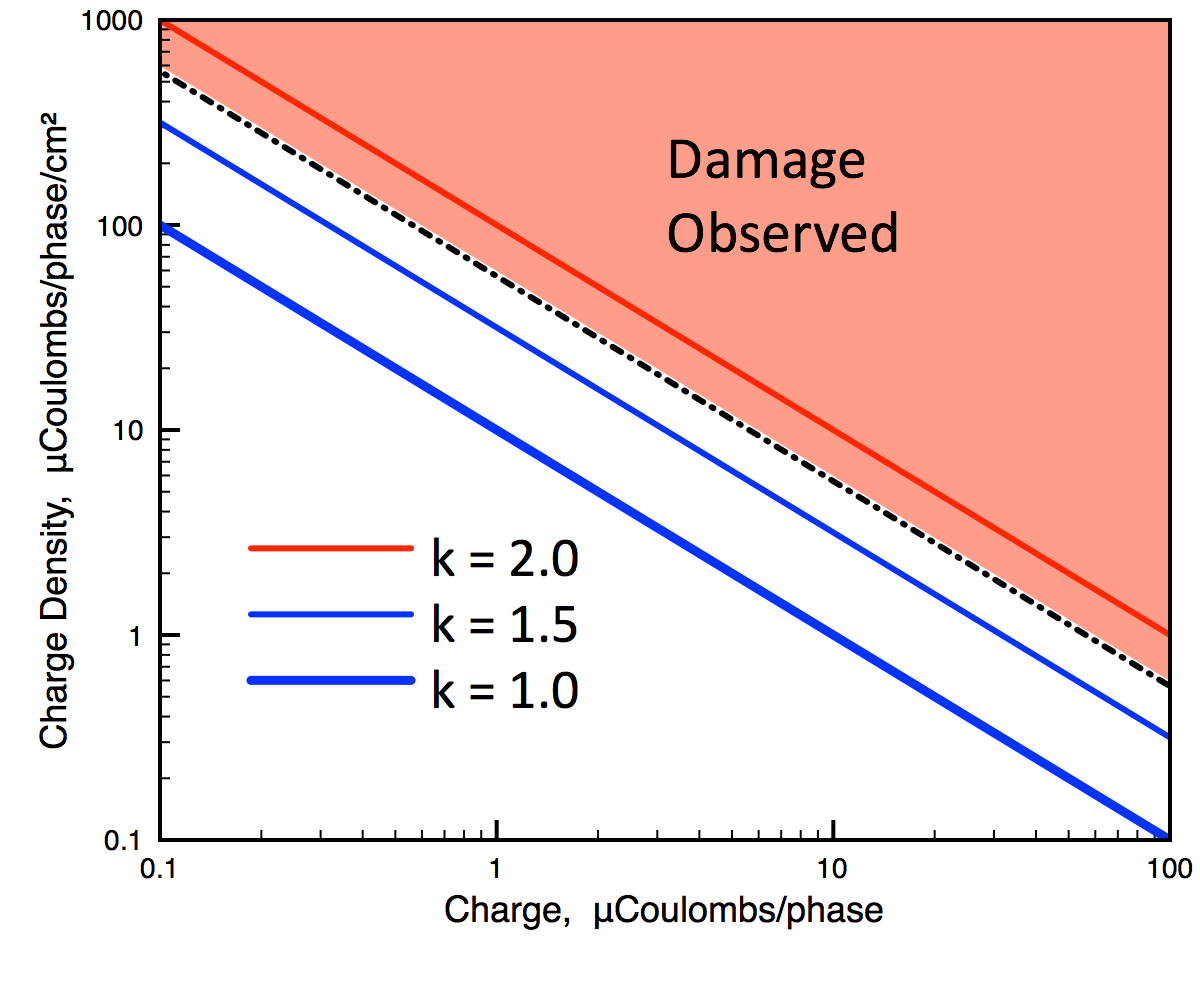
Plot of Shannon criteria for safe level of electrical stimulation of nervous tissue

In neural engineering, the Shannon criteria constitute an empirical rule that is used for evaluation of possibility of damage from electrical stimulation to nervous tissue.

The Shannon criteria relate two parameters for pulsed electrical stimulation: charge density per phase, D (μCoulombs/(phase•cm²)) and charge per phase, Q (μCoulombs/phase) with a dimensionless parameter k:

$$\log D = k - \log Q$$

which can be written alternatively:

$$10^{k} = Q * D$$

According to these criteria, stimulation parameters that yield k ≥ 1.85 (the lowest value where damage was observed in the two studies referenced in the original Shannon publication) could cause damage to the adjacent nervous tissue. Currently, this empirical law is applied in neuromodulation for development of implants for cortical, cochlear, retinal, and deep brain stimulation. Shannon categorizes the relationship between stimulating electrode and target neural tissue as either Near Field, Mid Field, or Far Field, and discusses how equation parameters may be chosen in each case. In the case of spinal cord stimulation, for example, the Far Field category would apply.

== Limitations ==
The data on which the Shannon model was built are restricted to experiments performed in cat cerebral cortex with 7 hours of stimulation under light anesthesia at 50 pps with 400 μs pulses (charge-balanced, symmetric, biphasic, anodic-first) using platinum surface disc electrodes of 1 mm² or larger, recessed, anodized sintered tantalum-tantalum pentoxide pellet electrodes of 1 mm in diameter, or iridium penetrating microelectrodes of 6500 μm^{2}. As a result of these restricted methods, Shannon states "A more comprehensive model of safe levels for electrical stimulation would also account for the effects of pulse rate, pulse duration, stimulus duty cycle, and duration of exposure." Additionally, further study has demonstrated that microelectrodes do not obey the Shannon criterion, and new approaches may be proposed to address these limitations.
