= Susan Mann (Canadian historian) =

Canadian historian

Susan Mann Trofimenkoff CM FRSC

President of York University
- In office 1992–1997
- Preceded by: Harry Arthurs
- Succeeded by: Lorna Marsden

Personal details
- Born: February 10, 1941 (age 85) Ottawa, Ontario, Canada

Susan Mann Trofimenkoff CM FRSC (born February 10, 1941) is a Canadian historian and was president of York University from 1992 to 1997. Mann is the sister of politician Gretchen Brewin.

Born in Ottawa, Ontario, Mann received a Bachelor of Arts degree in Modern History in 1963 from the University of Toronto, a Master of Arts degree from the University of Western Ontario in 1965, and a PhD from Université Laval in 1970. As professor, she has taught at the Université de Montréal (1966-1970), University of Calgary (1970-1972), and the University of Ottawa (1972-1992). She was chair of the Department of History at the University of Ottawa from 1977 to 1980. From 1984 to 1990 she was Vice-Rector Academic. From 1992 to 1997, she was the first woman president of York University.

Mann taught the first course in Canadian women's history, and was one of the founding members of the Canadian Research Institute for the Advancement of Women.

Mann is the author of Visions nationales, Une histoire du Québec (1986), Dream of Nation. A Social and Intellectual History of Quebec (1982), Stanley Knowles. The Man from Winnipeg North Centre (1982), and Action Française. French Canadian Nationalism in the 1920s (1975). She co-edited The Neglected Majority: Essays in Canadian Women's History (2 vol 1985) with Alison Prentice.

In 1985, Mann was made a fellow of the Royal Society of Canada. In 2000, she was made a Member of the Order of Canada.
