= Milos R. Popovic =

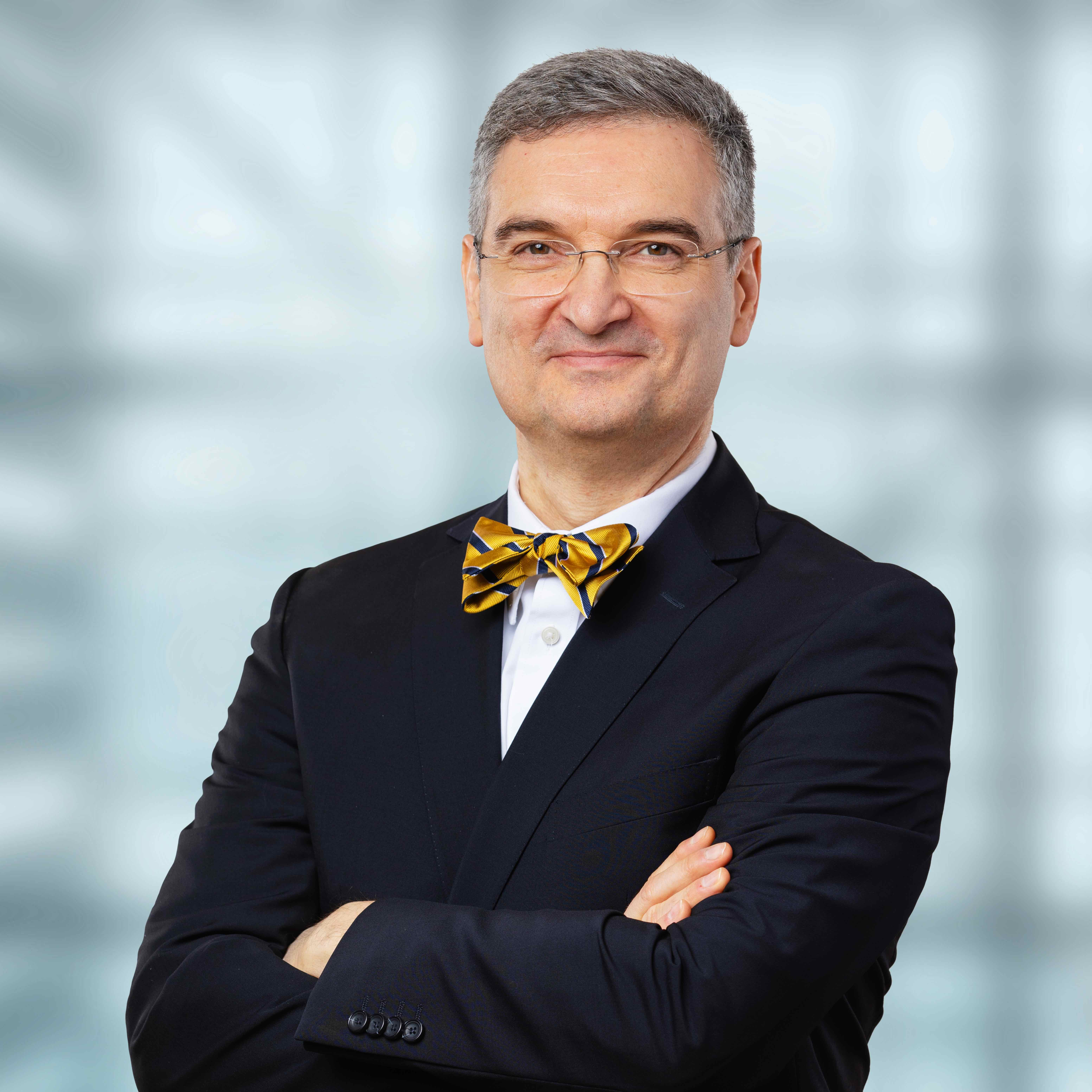
- Born: Belgrade, Serbia
- Education: University of Toronto; University of Belgrade
- Known for: Contributions to stroke and spinal cord injury rehabilitation
- Awards: 2014 UHN Inventor of the Year; 2008 Engineering Medal for Research and Development
- Scientific career
- Fields: Neurorehabilitation
- Workplaces: University of Toronto; Toronto Rehab Institute
- Website: http://reltoronto.ca/

Milos R. Popovic is a scientist specializing in Functional Electrical Stimulation (FES) and neurorehabilitation. As of 2018, he is the Director of the KITE Research Institute at the Toronto Rehabilitation Institute (TRI) - University Health Network (UHN). As of 2023, he is also the Director of the Institute of Biomedical Engineering at the University of Toronto.

== Education ==
Popovic received a Dipl. of Electrical Engineering from the University of Belgrade in his native Serbia in 1990. He then earned his Ph.D. in mechanical engineering from the University of Toronto (U of T) in 1996. His Ph.D. thesis was on Friction modelling and control, under supervision of Andrew Goldenberg.

== Career ==
=== Academic work ===
In July 2001, Popovic established The Rehabilitation Engineering Laboratory (REL) at the Lyndhurst Centre of TRI. The laboratory supports multiple research groups, including the Popovic lab, under the supervision of 6 principal investigators. In 2004, he established the Neural Engineering and Therapeutics research team at TRI, which works on translation of rehabilitative research into advanced therapeutic tools. Popovic led this team until 2017. In 2017, in partnership with Dr. Taufik Valiante, he established the Centre for Advancing Neurotechnological Innovation to Application (CRANIA) at UHN and U of T, which they jointly codirected until 2023. In 2018, Popovic was appointed TRI's Director of Research, which he rebranded into the KITE Research Institute in 2019. In 2021, he founded the FabrIc-Based REsearch (FIBRE) platform and directed it until 2023. In 2023, Popovic was appointed the Director of the Institute of Biomedical Engineering at U of T.

==== Functional electrical stimulation ====
Functional electrical stimulation (FES) uses bursts of short electrical pulses to generate muscle contraction. Application of these electrical pulses to motor nerves results in generation of an action potential along the axon of that nerve towards its targeted muscle. With electrodes placed on the skin over the muscle, individuals attempt to move their muscle by sending a signal with their brain to the muscle. The muscle is then stimulated by the system, causing a contraction which sends a signal from the muscle to the brain. Thus, a new neural pathway is formed, which improves recovery of voluntary movement.

Popovic has led studies investigating the use of FES in the rehabilitation of muscular function for stroke victims with extremely limited arm and hand mobility in comparison with conventional therapy. One of the best-known publications is "Rehabilitation of Reaching and Grasping Function in Severe Hemiplegic Patients Using Functional Electrical Stimulation Therapy", conducted in 2008. Electrical impulses to activate muscles were used in combination with verbal cues, and over the course of the treatment period, less FES was necessary to achieve the desired movements. Patients using FES in the study showed significant improvement in object manipulation, palmar grip torque, and pinch grip pulling force when compared to those using only conventional therapy.

==== Brain-machine interfaces ====
Popovic is involved in the development of various brain-machine interfaces (BMI) for use in humans, using implantable electrocorticographic (ECoG) and surface electroencephalographic (EEG) electrode. A neuroprosthesis study conducted using ECoG achieved high accuracy in producing intended grasp-and-release functionality in the hand. Real-time asynchronous control of a remote-controlled car was achieved using a single EEG electrode to eliminate restrictions related to information transfer rates. Work within this field tests the feasibility and functionality of using invasive and non-invasive physiological signals to improve implementation of FES as a rehabilitation method.

==== Compex Motion simulator ====
Popovic developed Compex Motion, a portable and programmable system used for transcutaneous FES, in collaboration with Swiss company Compex SA. The stimulator can be programmed to generate a variety of stimulation sequences, can be connected to other systems to increase channel capabilities, and can be controlled externally. The device can be used in the development of neuroprostheses, and muscle exercise systems. This work provided the foundation for the use of FES in SCI rehabilitation.

=== Industry ===
In 2008, Popovic co-founded medical technology company MyndTec based on the FES system that has been a focus of his research. The firm develops MyndMove, a transcutaneous FES therapy to improve function and maximize independence for patients with stroke- and spinal-cord injury-related paralysis.

=== Professional activities ===
In 2004, he was a co-founder of the Canadian National Spinal Cord Injury Conference and acted as a co-chair for their annual event until 2017. As part of his work with iDAPT, he contributed to the Spinal Cord Injury: A Manifesto for Change. In 2023, Popovic founded the International Conference on Aging, Innovation and Rehabilitation (ICAIR).

== Honours and awards ==
National level awards are listed below:

- 2025: Listed among Forbes Accessibility 100
- 2025: Elected to the College of Fellows of the Engineering Institute of Canada
- 2024: Elected to the College of Fellows of the Canadian Academy of Health Sciences
- 2024: Elected to the College of Fellows of the Institute of Electrical and Electronics Engineers (IEEE), USA
- 2020: Dave Lostchuck Memorial Award for Outstanding Research, Canadian Spinal Research Organization, Toronto, Canada
- 2019: Elected to the College of Fellows of the Canadian Academy of Engineering
- 2018: Jonas Salk Award - March of Dimes, Toronto, Ontario
- 2013: Health Technology Exchange - Morris (Mickey) Milner Award for outstanding contributions in Assistive Technologies
- 2011: Elected to College of Fellows of the American Institute of Medical and Biological Engineering
- 1997: Swiss National Science Foundation Technology Transfer Award - 1st place (with Thierry Keller)

== Notable publications ==
- Pappas, I.P.I.; Popovic, M.R.; Keller, T.; Dietz, V.; Morari, M. (June 2001). "A reliable gait phase detection system". IEEE Transactions on Neural Systems and Rehabilitation Engineering. 9 (2): 113–125. CiteSeerX 10.1.1.332.7033. doi:10.1109/7333.928571. PMID 11474964. S2CID 17883615.
- Masani, Kei; Popovic, Milos R.; Nakazawa, Kimitaka; Kouzaki, Motoki; Nozaki, Daichi (December 2003). "Importance of Body Sway Velocity Information in Controlling Ankle Extensor Activities During Quiet Stance". Journal of Neurophysiology. 90 (6): 3774–3782. doi:10.1152/jn.00730.2002. PMID 12944529.
- Masani, Kei; Vette, Albert H.; Popovic, Milos R. (February 2006). "Controlling balance during quiet standing: Proportional and derivative controller generates preceding motor command to body sway position observed in experiments". Gait & Posture. 23 (2): 164–172. doi:10.1016/j.gaitpost.2005.01.006. PMID 16399512.
- Popovic, M R; Thrasher, T A; Adams, M E; Takes, V; Zivanovic, V; Tonack, M I (March 2006). "Functional electrical therapy: retraining grasping in spinal cord injury". Spinal Cord. 44 (3): 143–151. doi:10.1038/sj.sc.3101822. PMID 16130018.
- Thrasher, T. Adam; Zivanovic, Vera; McIlroy, William; Popovic, Milos R. (November 2008). "Rehabilitation of Reaching and Grasping Function in Severe Hemiplegic Patients Using Functional Electrical Stimulation Therapy". Neurorehabilitation and Neural Repair. 22 (6): 706–714. doi:10.1177/1545968308317436. PMID 18971385. S2CID 7016540.
- Thrasher, T.A.; Popovic, M.R. (July 2008). "Functional electrical stimulation of walking: Function, exercise and rehabilitation". Annales de Réadaptation et de Médecine Physique. 51 (6): 452–460. doi:10.1016/j.annrmp.2008.05.006. PMID 18602712.
- Vette, Albert H.; Masani, Kei; Popovic, Milos R. (2008). "Neural-mechanical feedback control scheme can generate physiological ankle torque fluctuation during quiet standing: A comparative analysis of contributing torque components". 2008 IEEE International Conference on Control Applications. pp. 660–665. doi:10.1109/cca.2008.4629657. ISBN 978-1-4244-2222-7. S2CID 18927885.
- Popovic, Milos R.; Kapadia, Naaz; Zivanovic, Vera; Furlan, Julio C.; Craven, B. Cathy; McGillivray, Colleen (June 2011). "Functional Electrical Stimulation Therapy of Voluntary Grasping Versus Only Conventional Rehabilitation for Patients With Subacute Incomplete Tetraplegia: A Randomized Clinical Trial". Neurorehabilitation and Neural Repair. 25 (5): 433–442. doi:10.1177/1545968310392924. PMID 21304020. S2CID 27629343.
- Yoshida, Takashi; Masani, Kei; Sayenko, Dimitry G.; Miyatani, Masae; Fisher, Joseph A.; Popovic, Milos R. (January 2013). "Cardiovascular Response of Individuals With Spinal Cord Injury to Dynamic Functional Electrical Stimulation Under Orthostatic Stress". IEEE Transactions on Neural Systems and Rehabilitation Engineering. 21 (1): 37–46. doi:10.1109/TNSRE.2012.2211894. PMID 22899587. S2CID 35029907.
- Kapadia, Naaz; Masani, Kei; Catharine Craven, B.; Giangregorio, Lora M.; Hitzig, Sander L.; Richards, Kieva; Popovic, Milos R. (September 2014). "A randomized trial of functional electrical stimulation for walking in incomplete spinal cord injury: Effects on walking competency". The Journal of Spinal Cord Medicine. 37 (5): 511–524. doi:10.1179/2045772314Y.0000000263. OCLC 1016953217. PMC 4166186. PMID 25229735.
- Milosevic, Matija; Masani, Kei; Kuipers, Meredith J.; Rahouni, Hossein; Verrier, Mary C.; McConville, Kristiina M.V.; Popovic, Milos R. (June 2015). "Trunk control impairment is responsible for postural instability during quiet sitting in individuals with cervical spinal cord injury". Clinical Biomechanics. 30 (5): 507–512. doi:10.1016/j.clinbiomech.2015.03.002. PMID 25812727.
- Marinho-Buzelli, Andresa R.; Masani, Kei; Rouhani, Hossein; Barela, Ana M.; Fernandes, Gustavo T.B.; Verrier, Mary C.; Popovic, Milos R. (October 2017). "The influence of the aquatic environment on the center of pressure, impulses and upper and lower trunk accelerations during gait initiation". Gait & Posture. 58: 469–475. doi:10.1016/j.gaitpost.2017.09.008. PMID 28923661.
