= Allan S. Detsky =

Canadian physician and health policy expert

- Citizenship: Canadian
- Education: Massachusetts Institute of Technology Harvard Medical School
- Awards: Order of Canada
- Scientific career
- Workplaces: University of Toronto, Mount Sinai Hospital (Toronto)

Allan Steven Detsky CM is a Canadian physician and health policy expert.

He is the ex-Physician-in-Chief at Mount Sinai Hospital, Toronto, Professor of Health Policy, Management and Evaluation, University of Toronto, and Senior Scientist, Division of Clinical Investigation and Human Physiology, Toronto General Research Institute.

== Biography ==
Detsky's initial training was in economics, and he graduated from Harvard Medical School in 1978, obtaining his MD and PhD from the Harvard–MIT Program in Health Sciences and Technology.

He was certified as a fellow of the Royal College of Physicians and Surgeons of Canada in 1980, with specialization in internal medicine.

== Research ==
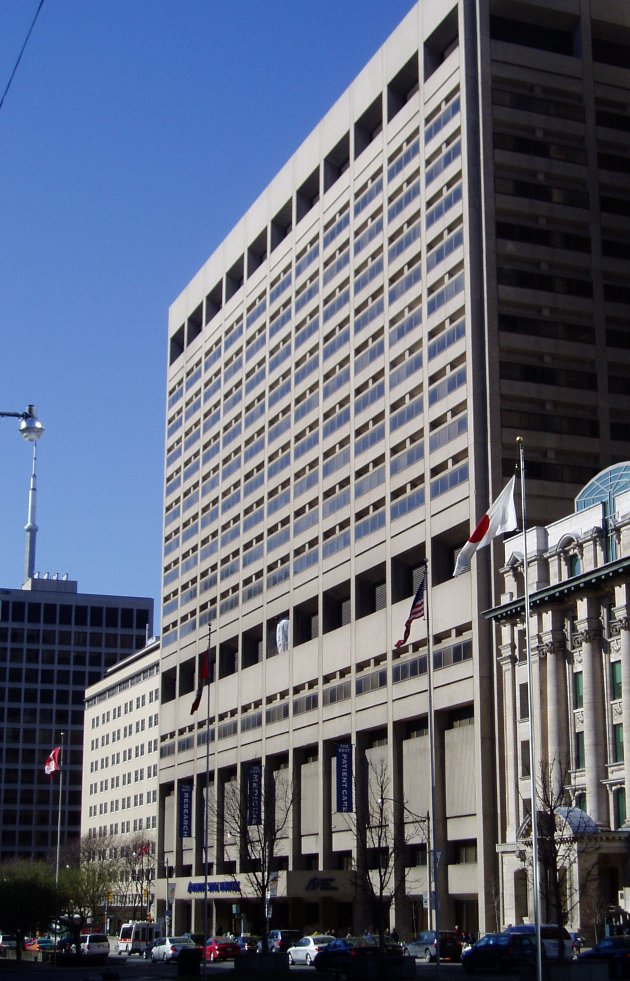
Mount Sinai Hospital, Toronto, where Detsky previously served as PIC

Detsky's initial research interest was health economics, and he slowly became recognized as an expert in the field, after a number of publications in the early 1980s. These included assessments of resource management in the intensive care unit, an evaluation of regulatory strategies in containing hospital costs in Ontario, and early ventures into economic planning in the wake of the AIDS epidemic.

Detsky posed many probing questions into the reality of cost effective medicine, and his 1990 contribution A clinician's guide to cost-effectiveness analysis is considered to be a user manual into cost-effectiveness analysis. He followed this with an article on How to use a clinical decision analysis as part of the JAMA Users Guides to the Medical Literature series .

His most recent research interest has stemmed from the SARS epidemic, which was somewhat devastating in Toronto . His other ongoing research includes bias in clinical care and research, the funding of the Ontario drug benefit program and the use of economic information to assess whether the Canadian government should pay for particular drugs.

== Professional career ==
Professionally, Detsky was elected as a member of the American Society for Clinical Investigation in 1992, was selected as a trustee member of the Society for Clinical Decision Making, and has served on the editorial board of the New England Journal of Medicine.

He has served in some managerial capacities within the Department of Medicine of the University of Toronto, and was Physician-in-Chief of Mount Sinai Hospital, Toronto where he held the Lionel and Sandra Waldman Family Chair for the Physician-in-Chief, until 2009. He is an Associate Professor and clinical investigator at the University of Toronto Department of Health Policy, Management and Evaluation.

Detsky is also a producer of several musicals, notably Broadway and West End productions of Come From Away.

== See also ==
- Epidemiology
- Evidence-based medicine
- Mount Sinai Hospital, Toronto
- University Health Network
- University of Toronto
