= Mount Sinai Hospital (Toronto) =

- Sinai Health System

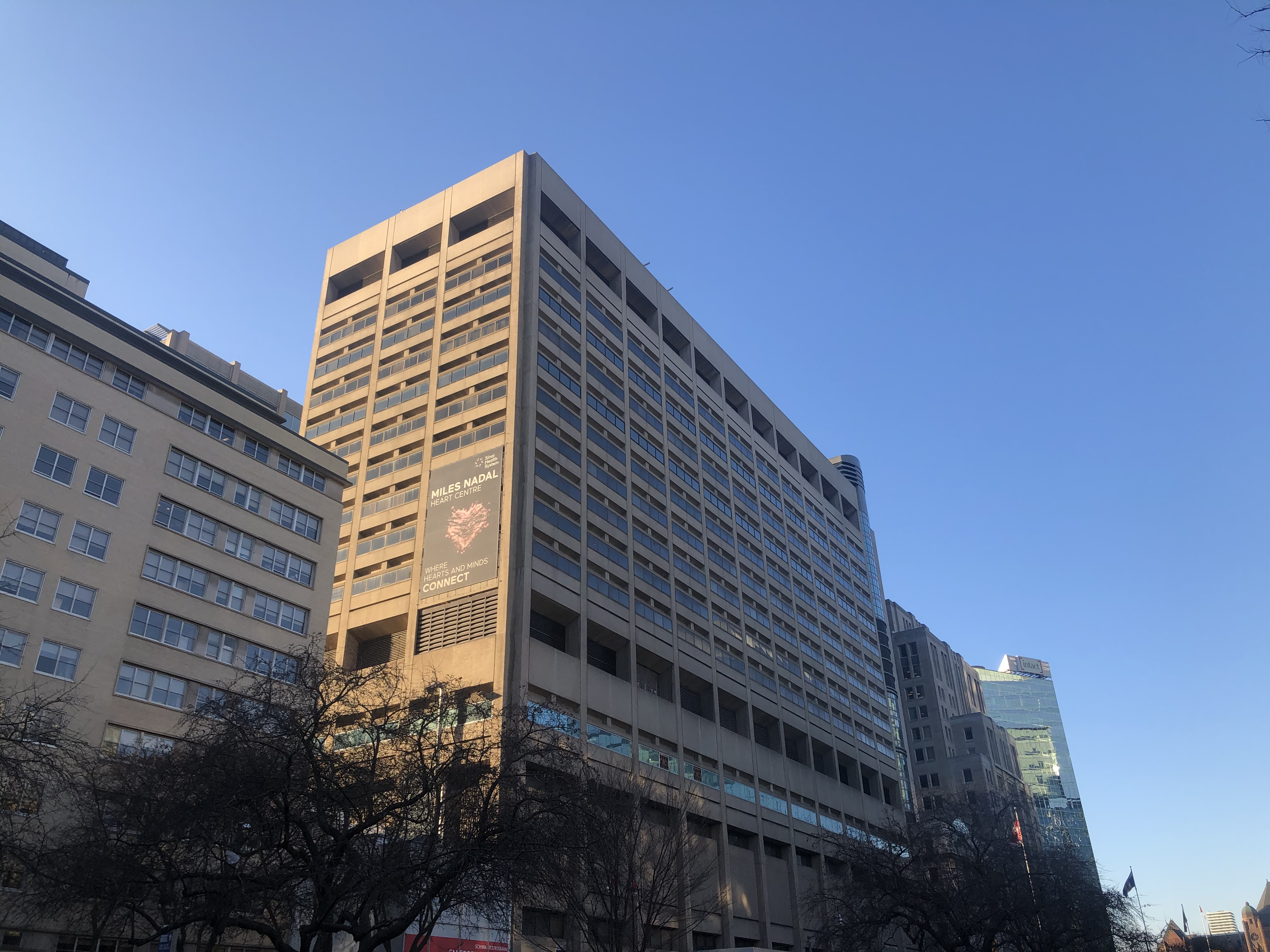

Geography
- Location: 600 University Avenue, Toronto, Ontario, Canada
- Coordinates: 43°39′27″N 79°23′24″W

Organization
- Care system: Public Medicare (Canada)
- Type: General
- Affiliated university: University of Toronto

Services
- Emergency department: Yes
- Beds: 442

History
- Founded: 1923 as Hebrew Maternity and Convalescent Hospital and Mount Sinai c. 1924; 1953 present site

Links
- Website: www.mountsinai.on.ca
- Lists: Hospitals in Canada

Mount Sinai Hospital (MSH) is a hospital in downtown Toronto, Ontario, Canada. Mount Sinai is part of Sinai Health. Sinai Health was formed through the voluntary amalgamation of Mount Sinai Hospital (including the Lunenfeld-Tanenbaum Research Institute) and Hennick Bridgepoint Hospital on January 22, 2015.

Mount Sinai is linked by bridges and tunnels to three adjacent hospitals of the University Health Network (Toronto General Hospital, Toronto Rehabilitation Institute, and Princess Margaret Cancer Centre). During the 2005 annual charity, the hospital reported to the Canada Revenue Agency as having assets of roughly C$ 520 million. In the 2019–2020 fiscal year there were nearly 29,000 inpatient stays and 59,700 emergency department visits for Mount Sinai Hospital. The average length of stay for inpatients was 4.4 days.

Mount Sinai Hospital has existed in Toronto since 1923 under various names; it has occupied its present site on University Avenue since 1953. In the fiscal year ending March 2013, Mount Sinai Hospital cared for 128,714 inpatients days, delivered almost 7,000 babies and performed almost 20,000 surgeries. Toronto and area residents made more than half a million ambulatory clinic visits to Mount Sinai. In that same year, the hospital's Schwartz/Reisman Emergency Department saw 56,080 visits and that number is expected to increase to 80,000 per year over the next few years.

More than 600 staff work at the Lunenfeld-Tanenbaum Research Institute, Mount Sinai's research facility. The institute was established in 1985 as the Samuel Lunenfeld Research Institute. On June 24, 2013, it became the Lunenfeld-Tanenbaum Research Institute. Many of its researchers hold faculty appointments at the University of Toronto.

In October 2010, Mount Sinai Hospital was named one of Greater Toronto's Top Employers by Mediacorp Canada Inc.

Dr. Gary Newton was appointed president and CEO of Mount Sinai Hospital, Sinai Health in October 2016.

== History ==
In 1913, the Ezras Noshem Society was founded by Slova Greenberg. During the August of that year, the Society began a fundraising campaign to establish a hospital, spearheaded by four immigrant women: Mrs. Cohn, Mrs. Miller, Mrs. Spiegel and Mrs. Adler.

In 1922, a location at 100 Yorkville Avenue was purchased with $12,000. The two-storey building was built as a private residence in 1871 by James D. Bridgland, the Crown's Inspector of Roads; in 1914, the home was converted into the Lyndhurst Private Hospital.

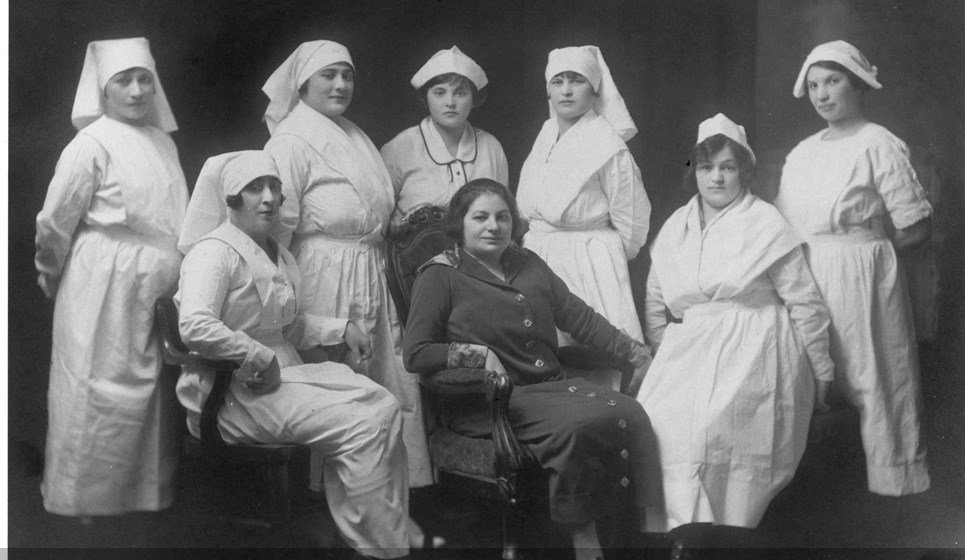
Dorothy Dworkin (seated in the centre) with members of the Mount Sinai Hospital Ladies Auxiliary, circa 1923

In 1923, the hospital opened and was named "The Hebrew Maternity and Convalescent Hospital". Dorothy Dworkin, who helped in the fundraising campaign, became president of the institution. The first list of permanent staff included: a nursing superintendent, four graduate and two undergraduate nurses, a cook, a laundress, a housemaid and a janitor, while the 33 Jewish doctors in the city all volunteered some time.

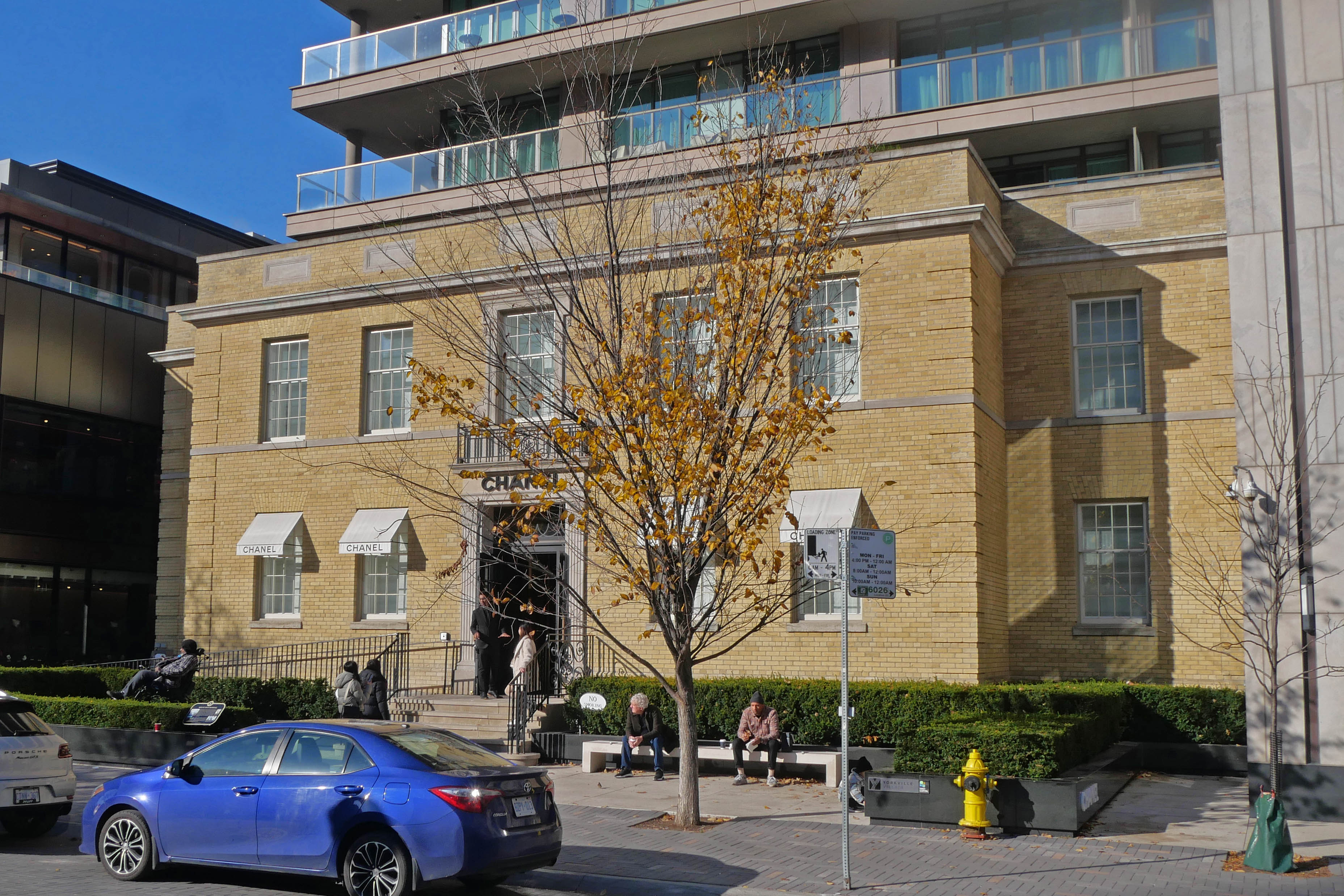
100 Yorkville Avenue in 2023

In 1924, the name was changed to Mount Sinai Hospital.

In 1930, a new surgical wing was begun by architects, Kaminker & Richmond. The original designs were drawn up in 1928 by Benjamin Swartz. The project was only completed in 1934.

In 1943, a new site was purchased on University Avenue at the corner of Gerrard Street. In 1953, it opened. In the same year, the original Mount Sinai Hospital became the St. Raphael's Nursing Home.

In 1985, the original property was designated as a site of historical significance by the Toronto Historical Board (Heritage Toronto). Despite this, the 1930 wing was partially demolished in 1988.

In 2015, Mount Sinai Hospital, Hennick Bridgepoint Hospital, and Circle of Care joined in a voluntary amalgamation to create the Sinai Health, which has the goal of creating an integrated health system that provides more efficient, coordinated care for patients.

At the time of its founding, Mount Sinai Hospital was the only hospital to offer kosher food in Canada. Indeed, it was an institution where Jewish patients could communicate in Yiddish, and be able to observe their religious practices. The hospital has continued to be an institution to provide culturally appropriate services to the Jewish community alongside other immigrant and non-English speaking communities. It is affiliated with many universities, including University of Toronto.

== Additional images ==
Previous logo of the hospital

Logo of the hospital prior to 2015 formation of Sinai Health System

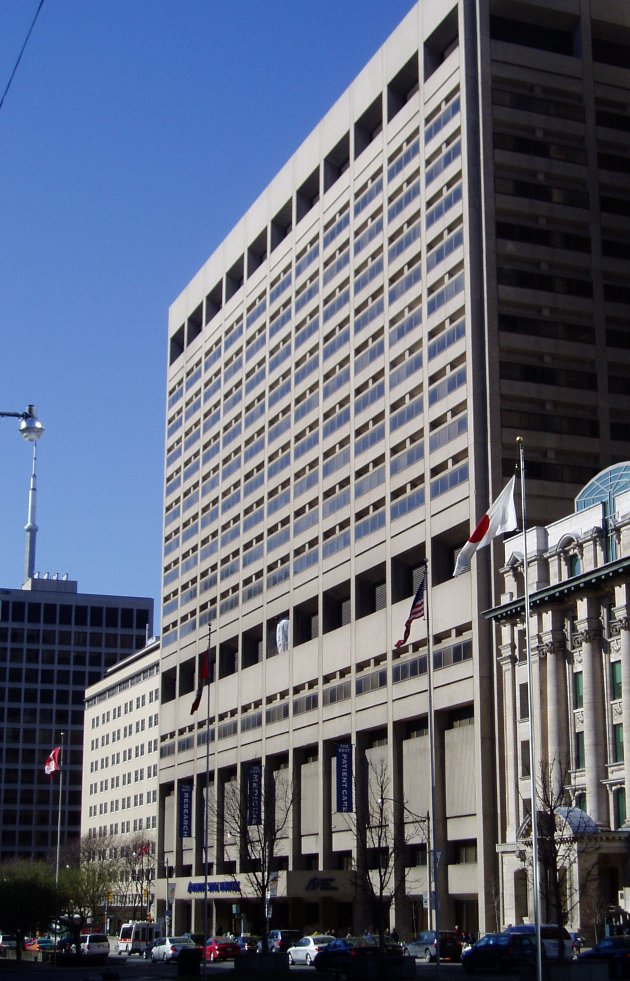
The exterior of the hospital

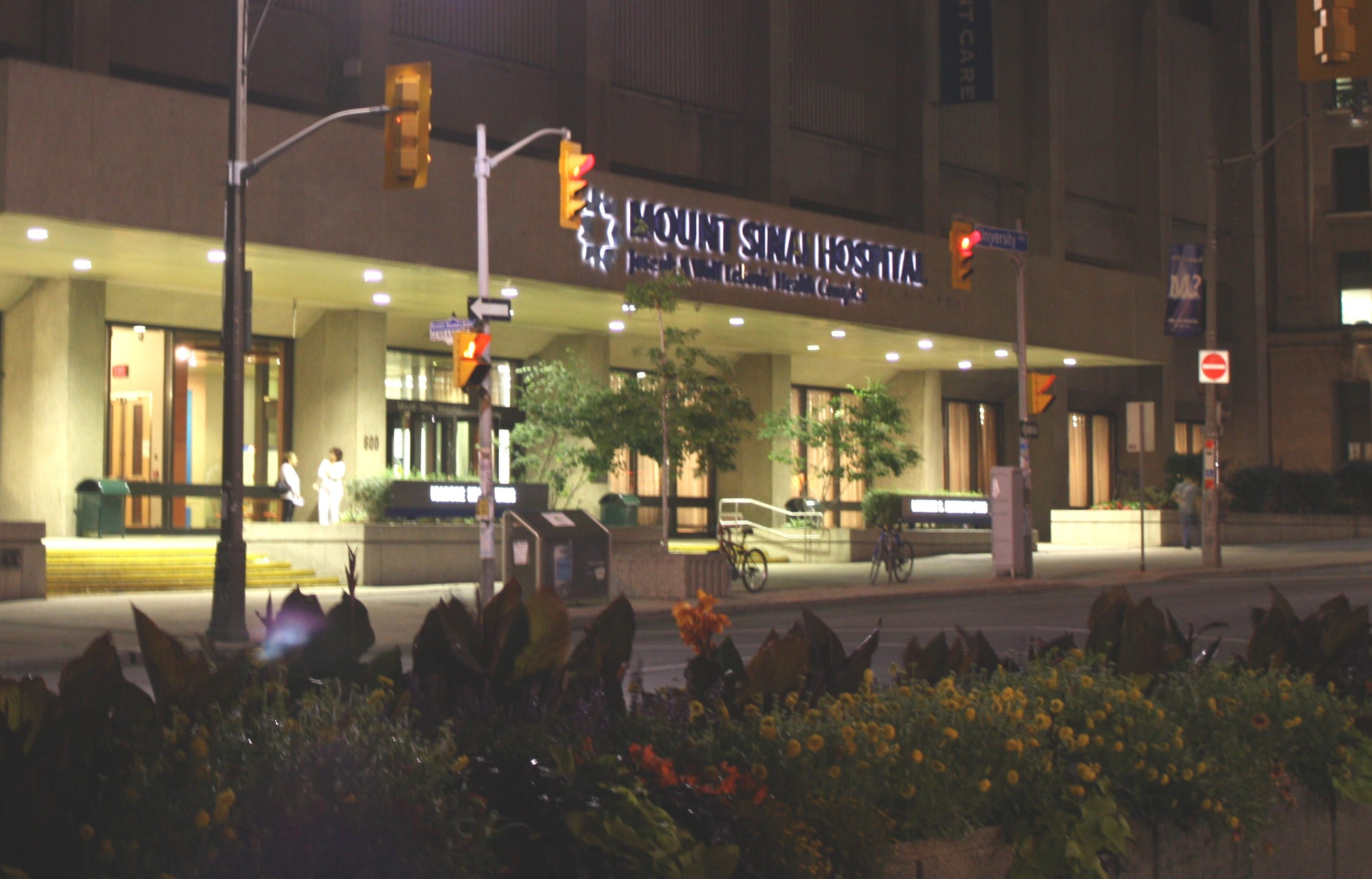
Mount Sinai Hospital from University Avenue

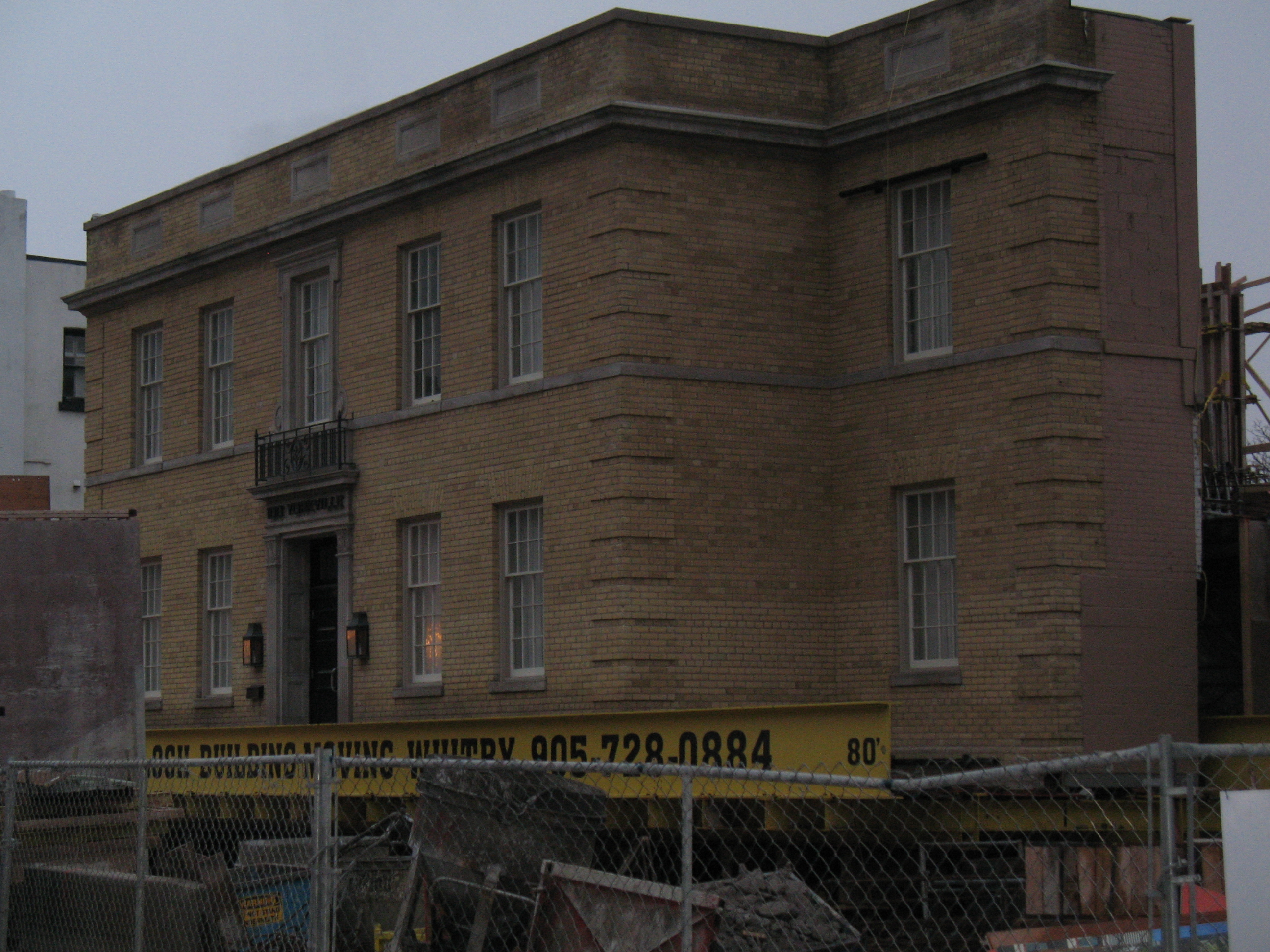
The 100 Yorkville Facade under construction, 2008

== See also ==
- Dorothy Dworkin
- Allan S. Detsky
- Lunenfeld-Tanenbaum Research Institute
