= Harry Arthurs =

Canadian labour law scholar

Harry William Arthurs OC, O.Ont, FRSC, FBA
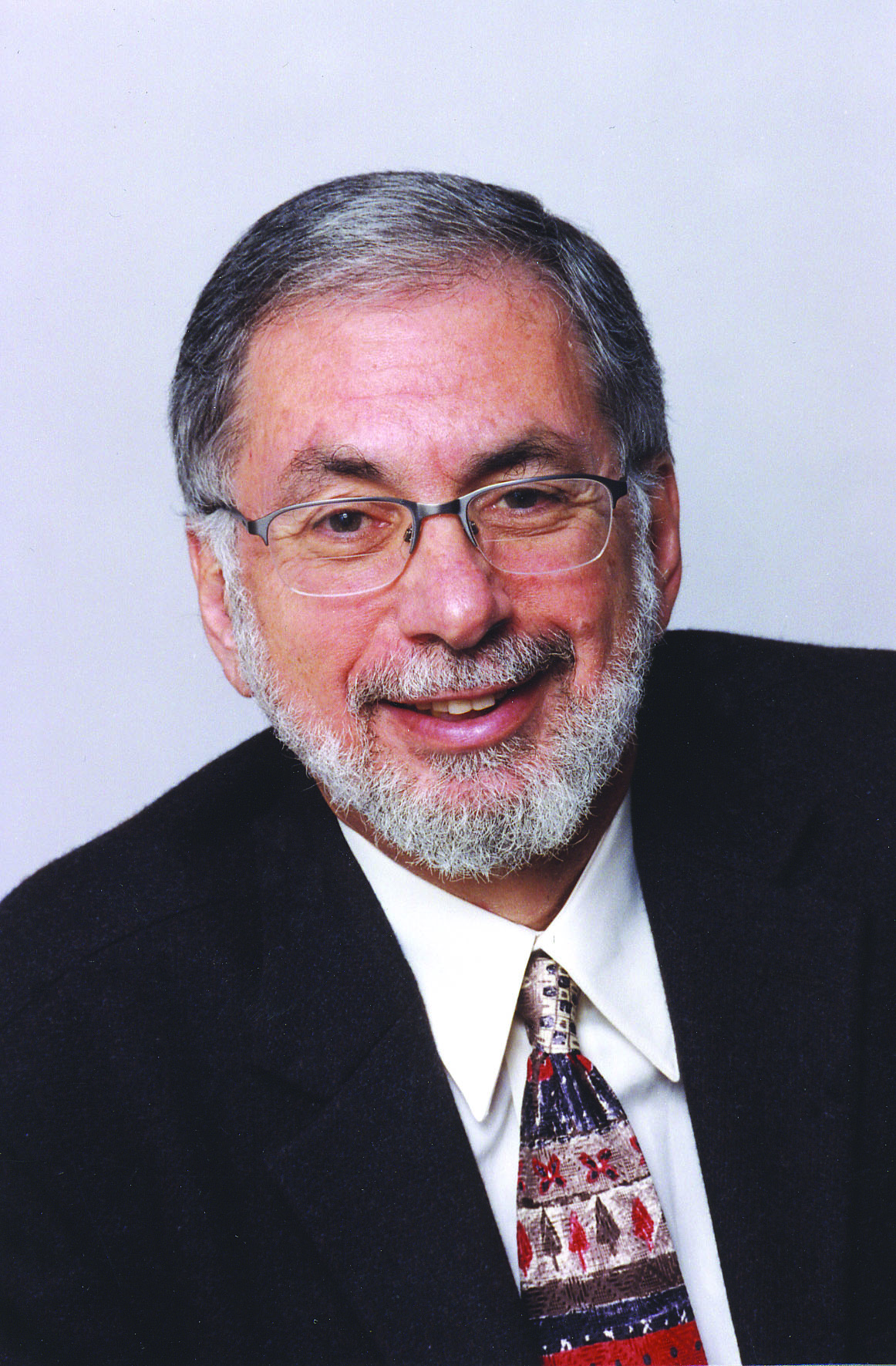

President of York University
- In office 1985–1992
- Preceded by: Hugh Ian Macdonald
- Succeeded by: Susan Mann

Personal details
- Born: May 9, 1935 (age 91) Toronto, Ontario, Canada
- Education: University of Toronto (BA, LLB); Harvard University (LLM)

Harry William Arthurs OC OOnt FRSC FBA (born May 9, 1935) is a Canadian lawyer, academic, and academic administrator. He is one of Canada's leading labour law scholars.

== Early life and education ==
Born in Toronto, Ontario, he attended the Oakwood Collegiate Institute. Dorothy Dworkin is his grandmother. He received a Bachelor of Arts degree in 1955 and a Bachelor of Laws degree in 1958 from the University of Toronto. He received a Master of Law in 1959 from the Harvard Law School. He was called to the Ontario Bar in 1961.

== Career ==
In 1961, he joined the faculty of the Osgoode Hall Law School as an assistant professor. In 1964, he was made an associate professor and a professor in 1968. From 1968 to 1970 he was the associate dean and from 1972 to 1977, he was the dean. From 1985 to 1992, he was the president of York University. In 1995, he was appointed university professor of law and political science.

In 2004, he was appointed commissioner leading the review of federal Labour Standards, Part III of the Canada Labour Code, in 2006 as chair of the Ontario Expert Commission on Pensions, and in 2010 as chair of the Funding Review of the Workplace Safety and Insurance Board.

He is the author of Without the Law: Administrative Justice and Legal Pluralism in Nineteenth Century England, published in 1985.

== Honours ==
- In 1982, he was made a Fellow of the Royal Society of Canada.
- In 1988, he was made an Officer of the Order of Canada as "one of Canada's leading labour law scholars" who "has distinguished himself in many aspects of public life".
- In 1995, he was awarded the Order of Ontario.
- In 2002, he was awarded the Canada Council's Killam Prize, "Canada’s most distinguished annual award for outstanding career achievement in social sciences, humanities, engineering, natural sciences and health sciences".
- In 2003, he was elected a Corresponding Fellow of the British Academy, given to scholars who are outside the United Kingdom who have "attained high international standing in any of the branches of study which it is the object of the Academy to promote".
- In 2003, he was awarded the first University of Toronto's Bora Laskin Award recognizing distinguished contributions to Canadian labour law.
- In 2008, he was awarded the ILO Decent Work Research Prize, jointly with Joseph Stiglitz
- In 2013, he was awarded the first Labour Law Research Network Award for Distinguished Contributions to Labour Law.
- He has received honorary degrees from Sherbrooke University, Brock University, The Law Society of Upper Canada, McGill University, University of Montreal, University of Toronto, University of Lethbridge, University of Windsor, Simon Fraser University and York University.
