= Sidney Lewine =

Sidney Lewine (March 31, 1915 – July 1, 2004) was director of the former Mount Sinai Hospital in Cleveland, Ohio. Lewine founded the first inpatient psychiatric unit and rehabilitation division in the nation in 1960. He was president of the Greater Cleveland Hospital Association from 1969 to 1972.

== Biography ==
Lewine was born in Atlantic City, New Jersey and moved to Cleveland to lead the Jewish Vocational Service. He joined Mount Sinai in 1950 and was named hospital director in 1952.

== Later life ==
After retiring in 1977, Lewine became director of the center for Urban Hospitals.

Lewine was married to Leanore Lewine. They had three children and six grandchildren.
