= Maurice Bernon =

American judge and chairman of UJA (1885–1954)

- Born: August 24, 1885 Cleveland, Ohio, U.S.
- Died: March 24, 1954 (aged 68) Cleveland, Ohio, U.S.
- Occupation: Judge, Philanthropist
- Spouse: Minnie Reiss (m. 1912)
- Children: 2

Judge of Common Pleas Court of Cuyahoga County
- In office April 1920 – 28 March 1924
- Appointed by: Gov. James M. Cox

Maurice Bernon was an American judge, lawyer, and philanthropist who served as the president of the Cleveland Bar Association, chairman of the Jewish Welfare Fund, president of the Jewish Vocational Service, and vice president of the Jewish Welfare Federation. He served on the Cleveland City Council and in the Ohio Senate.

== Early Life and Political Career ==
=== Childhood and education ===
Maurice Bernon was born in Cleveland, Ohio, on August 24, 1885, to Jewish parents David J. and Augusta Jacobs Bernstein. He was part of a large family, which included brothers Harry, I. Robert, and Isadore, as well as sisters Bea and Mabel. After graduating from Central High School in 1903, he enrolled in Western Reserve University Law at the age of 18. Three years later, he graduated with an LLB degree.

=== Initial Career (1907 - 1919) ===
Maurice Bernon had become acquainted with Cleveland mayor Tom L. Johnson, who encouraged the newly graduated lawyer to run for city council. Although Bernon knew little of politics, he was persuaded to run, and he was elected to the Cleveland's city council in 1907 at the age of 22, representing the 15th Ward on lower Woodland Avenue. Maurice quickly became a protege of Cleveland city solicitor Newton D. Baker. After serving one term on the council, he became the assistant city solicitor, working directly under Baker. In 1911, Baker was elected mayor of Cleveland, and a year later, Bernon won election to the Ohio Senate.

In 1914, Ohio governor James M. Cox appointed Maurice Bernon to the municipal bench. In 1915, he was elected as a judge, but resigned two years later to practice law. In 1918, he became an acting special counsel to the state attorney general.

=== Judgeship and National Fame (1920 - 1924) ===
In April 1920, Governor James M. Cox again appointed him to a judgeship, this time to the Common Pleas Court. Bernon ran for election that November and was elected to a two-year term. It was during this term that he achieved national fame for the first time as he presided over a notorious July 1921 case where Eva Catherine Kaber was tried for the poisoning and murder of her husband Daniel Kaber, a case where Kaber's mother and daughter had also been indicted for participating in the crime. Kaber was ultimately found guilty and sentenced to life.

Bernon was endorsed by the Civic League as he ran for re-election in 1922; he was cited as having "an excellent judicial record, is competent and fearless; should be re-elected." A year later, Bernon presided over another well-publicized trial, he oversaw the case of John Leonard Whitfield who was found guilty of the murder of policeman Dennis Griffin after the latter had instructed him to drive him to a police station. On March 28, 1924, Bernon decided to resign from the Common Pleas Bench of Cuyahoga County.

"Maurice Bernon was an unusual judge. Equipped with a natural judicial temperament, he brought to the bench outstanding honesty and ability. Few will disagree with the statement that Maurice Bernon has been one of the best judges who ever sat on the bench in Cleveland. From time to time, The Press has disagreed with Judge Bernon. But The Press always respected the judge because of the sincerity of his stand. One of the biggest things that can be said in Judge Bernon's behalf is that in all of his years on the bench, he never usurped extrajudicial power, never attempted to exceed the powers that the law delegated to him. This, we regret to be compelled to say, cannot be recorded of all our local judges."

— The Cleveland Press Editorial Page

=== Cleveland Politics (1924 - 1939) ===
At only 29, Bernon once more found himself as a practicing lawyer. Years later, he stated that he was still young and had children growing up and wanted to go back into practice. In the summer of 1924, he accompanied former governor Newton D. Baker to the 1924 Democratic National Convention where the latter urged America's participation in the League of Nations. Both men roomed together during the Convention; Bernon would later relate that a sleep-deprived Baker had gone onstage without his notes that Bernon was carrying.

Bernon became a senior partner at the firm of Bernon, Mulligan, Keeley & LeFever. In 1928, he was elected president of the Cleveland Bar Association. As president, he fought to clean up election fraud. On November 2, 1928 he was appointed to the Board of Elections for Cuyahoga County by Ohio secretary of state Clarence J. Brown. Bernon became a driving force on the board of elections over the coming years and became one of the primary strategists for the Cuyahoga County Democratic Party as the ward-mayor form of government replaced the city's city manager plan.

In a surprise move in early 1934, Ohio secretary of state George S. Meyers refused to rename Bernon to the Board of Elections in likely retaliation for the Cleveland Democratic Party's lack of support when he ran in the 1932 primary. Although the Democratic Executive Committee voted unanimously for him to continue, Bernon decided to withdraw as a candidate on March 4 for the sake of party unity; Felix T. Matia was named as his successor on March 4. In 1936, he was elected to the party's Executive Board.

== Civic and Philanthropic Work ==
=== Jewish Welfare and Philanthropy ===
"I had to quit my law practice 12 years ago because of illness. Instead of dying, I went into something else. Faced with idleness, I felt a man dies mentally and physically if he quits. I had the welfare work to fall back on and it's been a lifesaver for me. I get more out of it than I give."

— Maurice Bernon, August 1950 in an interview on his philanthropic work

Maurice Bernon began serving as a trustee of the Jewish Welfare Federation in 1908. While he suspended his civic work during his time as a judge, Bernon returned quickly to it after leaving the bench and became a long-standing board member of the Jewish Children's Bureau. On February 2, 1931, as campaign chairman, Bernon and Edward M. Baker led a one-thousand-person canvassing operation in Cleveland on behalf of the Jewish Welfare Fund. Over time, Bernon served in additional posts, including vice president for the Bureau of Jewish Education, as trustee of the Euclid Avenue Temple in Cleveland, and as chairman of the religious school at the temple. By 1935, he had become a vice-president for the Jewish Welfare Fund.

In April 1936, he was named as an associate chairman for the Jewish Welfare Fund campaign, which was directed toward the relief of German, Polish, and other European Jews. After suffering a heart attack later in 1936, and ultimately retired from his law practice in 1938 after suffering from thrombosis.

However, instead of settling down, Bernon poured his time into his philanthropic and civic efforts and became one of the most active people within Cleveland's Jewish community. In January 1942, he led a campaign that raised over five hundred thousand dollars in pledges for improvements to Cleveland's Mt. Sinai Hospital.

Bernon worked with the Jewish Joint Distribution Committee, and he traveled to Detroit in September 1946, where a meeting was held to address the plight of European Jews. He then traveled to New Orleans in January 1947 to address the Southeast Region of the JDC as efforts continued to provide humanitarian and relocation assistance to European Jews following the conclusion of the Second World War. In September 1947, Bernon was elected chairman of the National Council of the Joint Distribution Committee for the JDC. He was re-elected to the post in May 1948 at the council's annual meeting in New York. On January 28, 1948, Maurice Bernon was presented with the Charles Eisenman Award by the Jewish Welfare organization, an award that was given annually to people and groups that "foster the spirit of civic consciousness and constructive philanthropy".

In April 1948, Maurice Bernon traveled to Paris, France, to attend a conference of directors for the JDC that included Rabbi Jonah B. Wise, Saly Mayer, Laura Margolis, and Louis D. Horowitz working to address the needs of the one and half million Jewish survivors.

"The morale of the Jewish refugees still living in displaced persons camps has dropped to a dangerously low level as a result of recent Palestine developments in the United States. The situation is so serious that immediate action must be taken to counter this trend"

— Maurice Bernon in Paris, France, April 1948

Bernon returned to the United States in May and worked on the Jewish Welfare Fund's campaign to raise $250 million dollars for European Jewish relief. On May 25, 1948, Bernon met with David Hacohen following Israel's declaration of statehood. Bernon continued his work in 1949, traveling to St Louis to meet with United Jewish Appeal in their efforts to raise $4.45M for the Jewish Welfare Fund. In November 1949 he traveled to Los Angeles to address the western regional conference of the JDC. In January 1951, he addressed delegates of the JDC and stated that the group had "provided invaluable aid" in bringing JDC's message throughout the United States and hastened Jewish recovery. Later that month, Bernon was named one of the national campaign chairmen of United Jewish Appeal. In April, he traveled to New Jersey and Pennsylvania and, along with others set a goal of $400K for United Jewish Appeal's 1951 campaign for the relocation of European Jews to the nation of Israel.

He continued to travel and lead fund-raising efforts in 1952, and was elected president of the East Central States Region of the Council of Jewish Federation Welfare Funds. In January 1953 as chairman of the JDC's National Council, Bernon spoke at the 38th annual meeting of the Joint Distribution Committee in New York City, stating that the ten thousand member JDC had become increasingly important in the previous year in "bringing the story of needy Jews oveseas to Jewish communities all over the United States." On February 15, 1953 he traveled to Miami, Florida to attend a United Jewish Appeal meeting to plan the next campaign, but where attendees also determined "take advantage of the occasion to set an example to contributors everywhere by making their own pledges on the spot." In March 1953, United Jewish Appeal named him as head of a council of over seventy state chairmen and co-chairmen to lead that year's campaign to raise $145 million dollars to aid in the immigration, welfare, and rehabilitation for the world's Jewish population. Later in 1953 in traveled once more to Paris, France to attend the JDC annual conference. In October 1953, Bernon traveled to Israel along with other Jewish businessmen and communal leaders at the invitation of Prime Minister David Ben-Gurion for an economic planning conference.

== Death ==
On March 24, 1954, Maurice Bernon passed away after having a second heart attack while at his desk in his Union Commerce Building office in Cleveland. His funeral was held two days later and was attended by hundreds of individuals. Friends from both the Democratic and Republican parties attended, and Rabbi Barnett of the Euclid Avenue Temple eulogized him as "a man with a heart of gold." Officers from United Jewish Appeal declared that he “was devoted and selfless as no other man has ever been in the cause of the United Jewish Appeal. His efforts were unflagging, tireless and always on call. “

"He was cited for long service to his community as "able lawyer, distinguished jurist, religious leader and great humanitarian." That citation, of course, did not cover all the phases of Mr. Bernon's busy life. He was a public servant who made a hobby of politics. It was a pleasure to see him in operation at Democratic headquarters on an election night. No one could make a better analysis of returns from the polls, and his forecasts usually were uncannily accurate. Mr. Bernon was a city councilman, a state senator, a Municipal judge, and a Common Pleas judge. An unusual circumstance is that he resigned from each of these elective offices. He held many other positions of honor and trust. Probably his most satisfactory years were the last 14. His doctor ordered him to take it easier because of a heart condition. Instead, he plunged deeper into welfare, civic, and religious affairs. Mr. Bernon had wit, courage and social vision. He had many, many friends."

== Personal ==
Maurice Bernon married Minnie Reiss (daughter of Henry and Sarah Reiss) in 1912 and had two children, Howard S Bernon and George Bernon. In February 1930, his son Howard was humorously featured in the Cleveland Press when he was profiled for his upcoming presentation of the "If A Son Could Choose His Father" program at the Euclid Avenue Temple, but had refused to tell his father what he was going to say. In May 1943, his son George, serving as a sergeant in the US Army in North Africa, was featured in an article about soldiers fighting in the Second World War writing letters to their mothers at home. Maurice served as president of the Anshe Chesed Congregation from 1943 to 1947.

His wife Minnie Bernon passed away on October 14, 1958 after battling a heart ailment, and was cited for her work in the Jewish Welfare Federation and the Women's Board of Mt. Sinai Hospital
