= Ontario Jewish Archives =

Jewish Archives in Ontario

Coordinates: 43.7642°N 79.4418°W

The Ontario Jewish Archives (OJA) is a community archives and the central repository for records related to Ontario's Jewish community. Located in Toronto, Ontario, what is today known as the Ontario Jewish Archives, Blankenstein Family Heritage Centre, was founded in 1973. The OJA maintains records dating back to the 1850s, including photographs, newspapers and minute books. Dara Solomon has been director of the archives since 2012, following Ellen Scheinberg (2002-2011) and founding director Stephen Speisman (1973-2000).

What became the OJA began as two file cabinets in a change room at the Shaarei Shomayim Synagogue in Toronto. The archives were officially formed in 1973 as part of a collaboration between the Toronto Jewish Historical Society and the Canadian Jewish Congress (Central Region). Since 1992, the archives has operated as a department of the United Jewish Appeal Federation of Toronto. In 2014 the name of the archives was expanded to the Ontario Jewish Archives, Blankenstein Family Heritage Centre following a donation from the Blankenstein family.
