= Toronto Rehabilitation Institute =

Coordinates: 43.656610°N 79.389846°W

- University Health Network

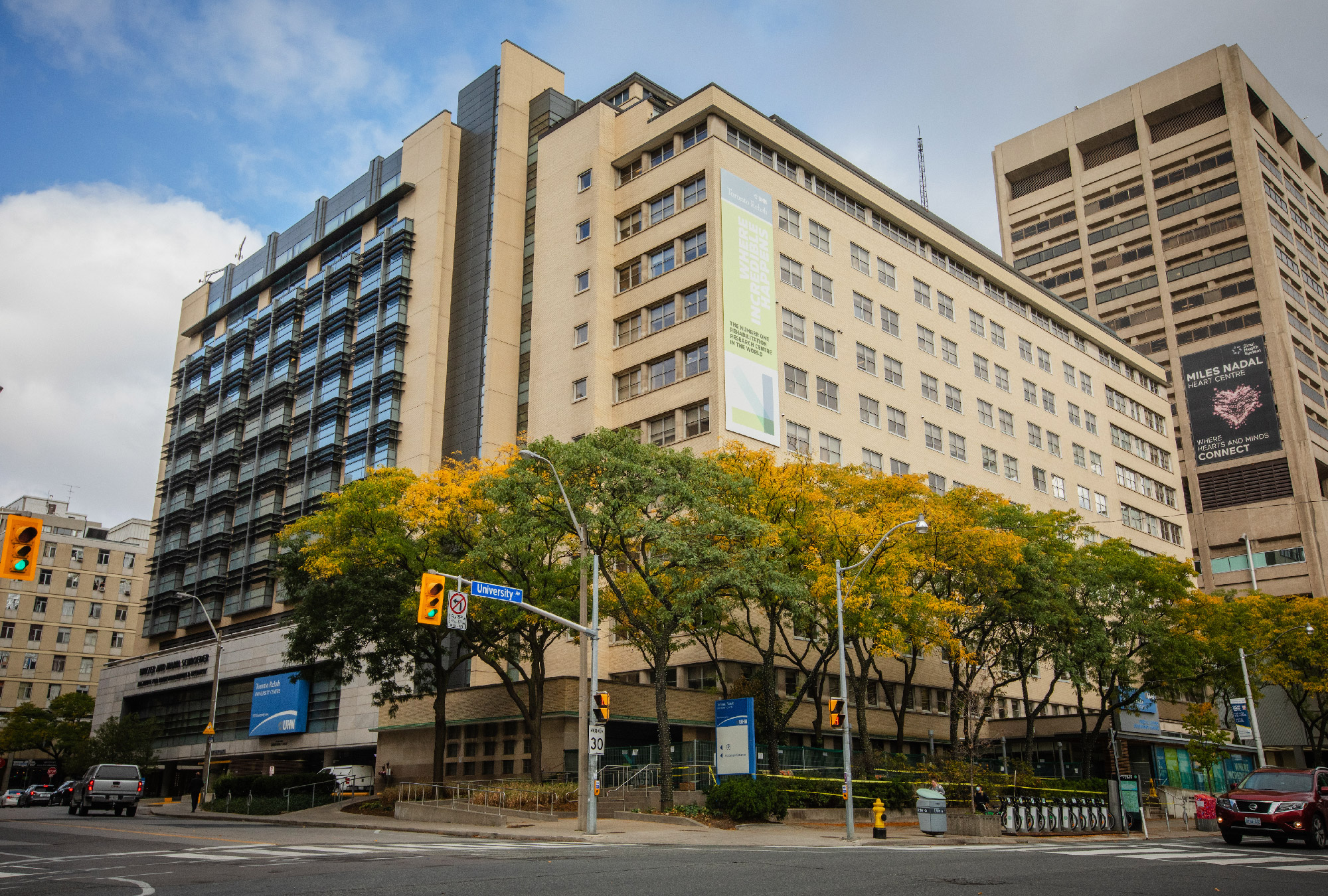
- Entrance to the University Centre site of the Toronto Rehabilitation Institute

Geography
- Location: Toronto, Ontario, Canada

Organization
- Care system: Medicare
- Type: Specialist
- Affiliated university: University of Toronto

Services
- Emergency department: No
- Specialty: Rehabilitation

History
- Founded: November 2, 1998

Links
- Website: UHN.ca/TorontoRehab

Toronto Rehabilitation Institute (TRI or commonly Toronto Rehab) is the largest rehabilitation hospital in Canada. Owned and operated by the University Health Network (UHN), Toronto Rehab provides patients with rehabilitation care, helping people rebuild their lives and achieve individualized goals following injury and disability. It is composed of five sites across Toronto, which are: Bickle Centre (130 Dunn Avenue), Lakeside Centre (150 Dunn Avenue), Lyndhurst Centre (520 Sutherland Drive), Rumsey Centre (345 and 347 Rumsey Road), and University Centre (550 University Avenue).

== History ==
=== Predecessor institutions ===
Toronto Rehabilitation Institute (TRI or Toronto Rehab) was formed through a series of rehabilitation hospital mergers, with a direct lineage of care dating to the 19th century.

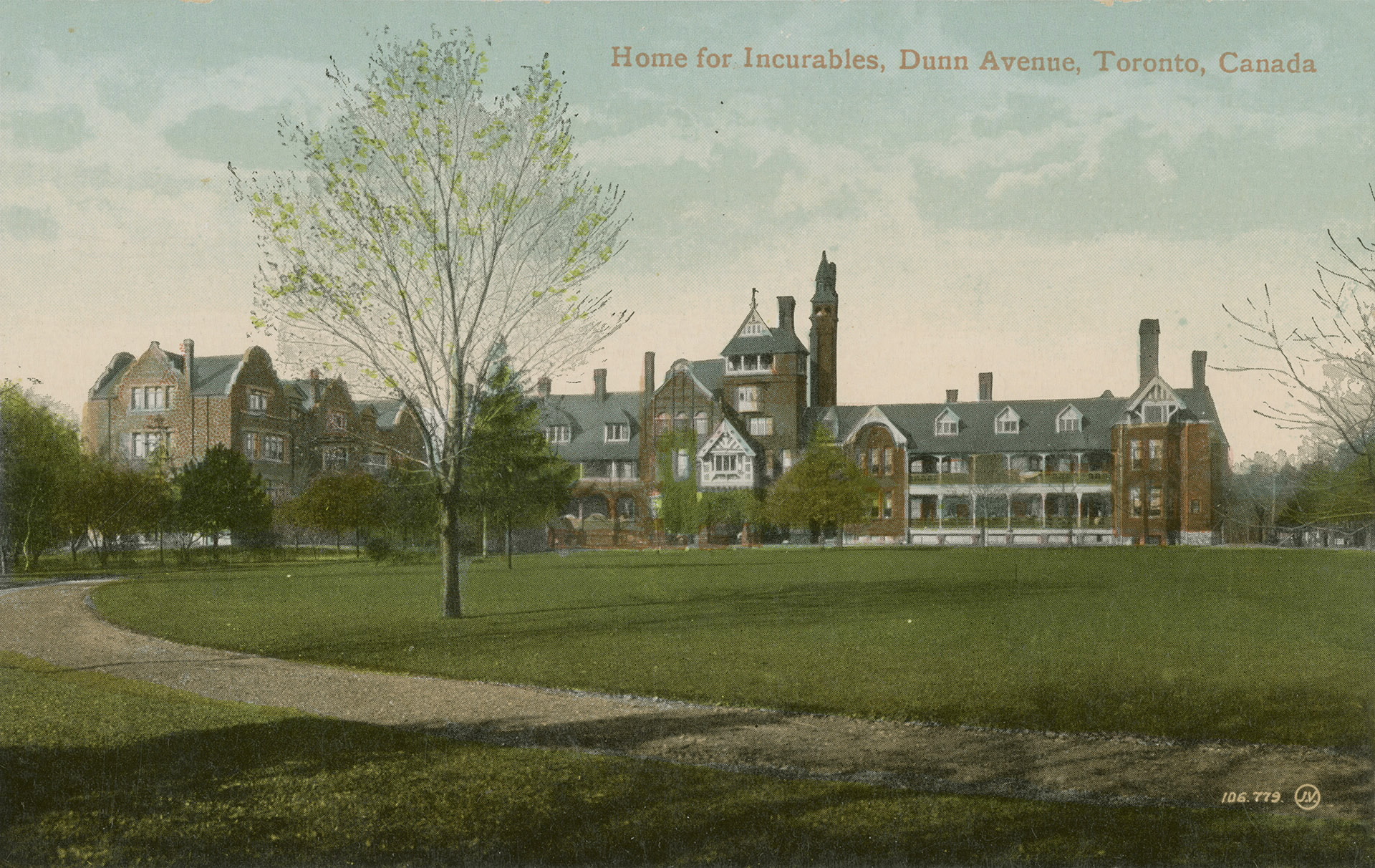
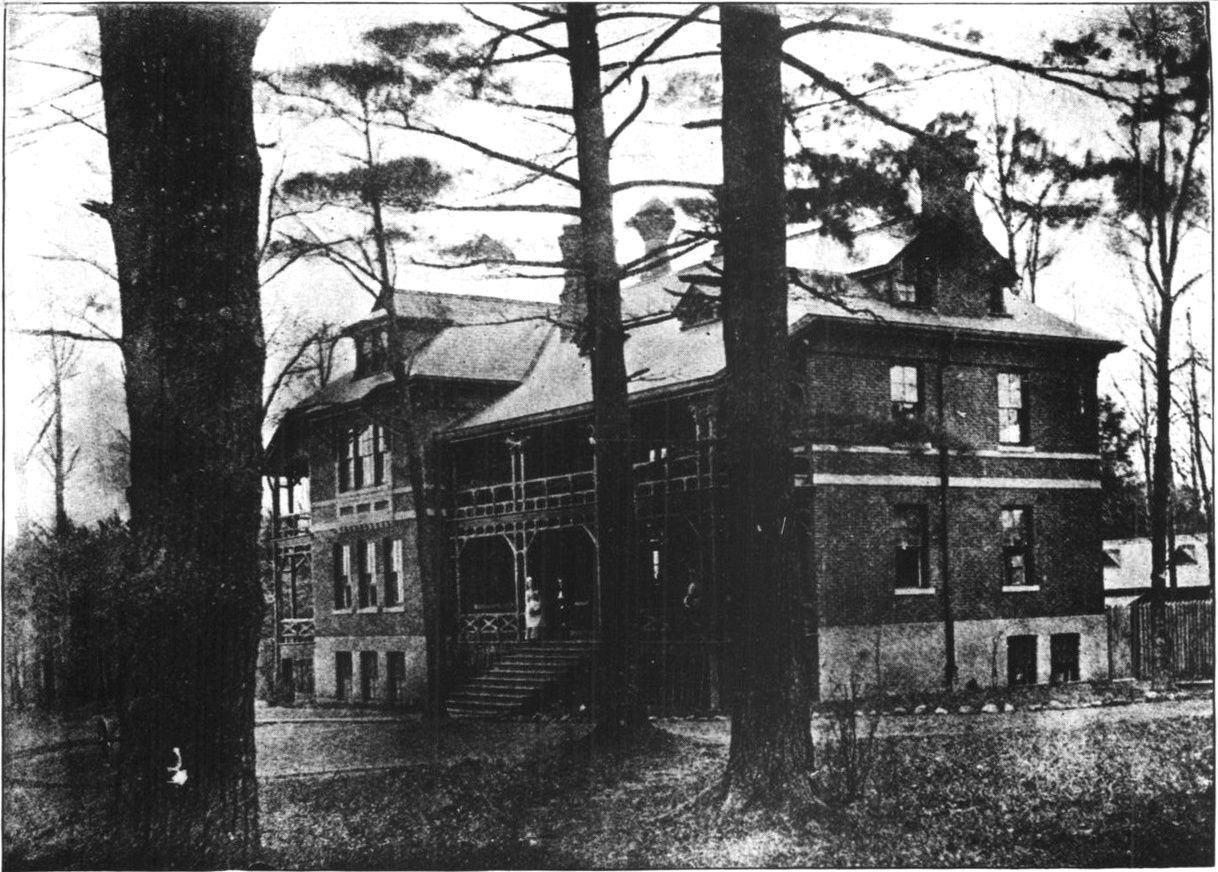
The Toronto Home for Incurables (1910, top) and Hillcrest Convalescent Home (c. 1896, bottom) were constructed in the suburban countryside as a more restful setting for patients.

The Toronto Home for Incurables opened in 1874 at Bathurst and King Streets, to receive long-term care patients from Toronto General Hospital, primarily those with untreatable forms of tuberculosis, heart disease and paralysis. In 1880, the home was moved into larger premises on Dunn Avenue in suburban Parkdale and was expanded several times in the following years. In the mid-century, the home was renamed the Queen Elizabeth Hospital for the Incurables then the Queen Elizabeth Hospital. In 1975, it became the first chronic care teaching hospital in Canada, affiliated with the University of Toronto. The hospital then expanded, constructing an additional facility at Dunn Ave. and purchasing a former building of Mount Sinai Hospital on University Ave.

The Hillcrest Convalescent Home was erected on an acre of land along Davenport Road (in what is now the Casa Loma neighbourhood) and opened to patients in 1886. Additions and alterations were made to accommodate more patients and the home incorporated in 1892. Hillcrest initially provided long-term care and later expanded to offer occupational therapy services as the Hillcrest Hospital.

The Toronto Rehabilitation Centre was formed in 1922 to provide services for World War I veterans. It was the first independent rehabilitation facility in North America and later specialized in outpatient cardiac care.

Lyndhurst Lodge was a mansion in the Casa Loma neighbourhood, purchased by the Department of Veterans Affairs and used from 1945 as a rehabilitation centre for veterans with spinal cord injuries. Under neurosurgeon Harry Botterell, pioneering work was done in this field which became known as the Canadian approach to spinal cord injury. The Lodge was opened to civilian patients in 1946. In 1950, the Lodge was acquired by the Canadian Paraplegic Association (CPA), and through the 1950s it was the only independent rehab facility for spinal cord injury in the world. To meet the demand for higher patient capacity, in 1974 work began on Lyndhurst Hospital in Toronto's Leaside neighbourhood. The Ontario government purchased the hospital in 1994.

In 1997, the Queen Elizabeth Hospital and Hillcrest Hospital were merged as the Rehabilitation Institute of Toronto. The following year, this organization was amalgamated with the Toronto Rehabilitation Centre and Lyndhurst Hospital as the Toronto Rehabilitation Institute.

=== Foundation and expansion ===
By a Special Act of Legislation, on November 2, 1998, the Toronto Rehabilitation Institute was created with the amalgamation of three hospitals. These were:

- Rehabilitation Institute of Toronto
- Lyndhurst Spinal Cord Centre
- Toronto Rehabilitation Centre

In 2007, TRI co-hosted the Festival of International Conferences on Caregiving, Disability, Aging and Technology (FICCDAT), uniting these five professional conferences with common themes for the first time.

In 2008, work began on a $112 million expansion and renovation of the University Centre site, including construction of a 13-story tower with expanded research and educational space.

In 2011, Toronto Rehab merged with the University Health Network (UHN).

In 2011, Toronto Rehab opened the iDAPT Centre Rehabilitation Research, where technologies and treatments to enhance the lives of people who are aging, ill or injured are tested in simulated environments.

In 2019, UHN consolidated the programs of the TRI Research Institute as KITE (knowledge, innovation, talent, everywhere) at UHN, led by research director Dr. Milos R. Popovic. Under this rebranding, the research institute broadened its focus from rehabilitation to assisting people living with the effects of illness, aging, and disability.

== Programs ==
Programs currently offered at Toronto Rehabilitation Institute include:

- Spinal cord rehabilitation
- Stroke rehabilitation
- Acquired Brain Injury rehabilitation
- Geriatric psychiatry rehabilitation
- Cardiovascular prevention and rehabilitation
- Complex continuing care
- Geriatric medicine rehabilitation
- Musculoskeletal and oncological rehabilitation
- Chronic pain rehabilitation services
- Long term care

== KITE research institute ==
KITE (Knowledge, Innovation, Talent, Everywhere) is the rehabilitation research institute located inside of Toronto Rehab. It was founded in 2001 following the $15-million funding commitment from the Ontario Ministry of Health and Long-Term Care. Their areas of research focus include restoration of function, independent living, enhanced participation, and injury prevention.

There are 11 research labs in KITE:

- CareLab
- ClimateLab
- DriverLab
- FallsLab
- HomeLab
- SleepdB
- StairLab
- StreetLab
- WinterLab
- Movement Evaluation Lab
- Rehabilitation Engineering Lab
