= List of University of Toronto alumni =

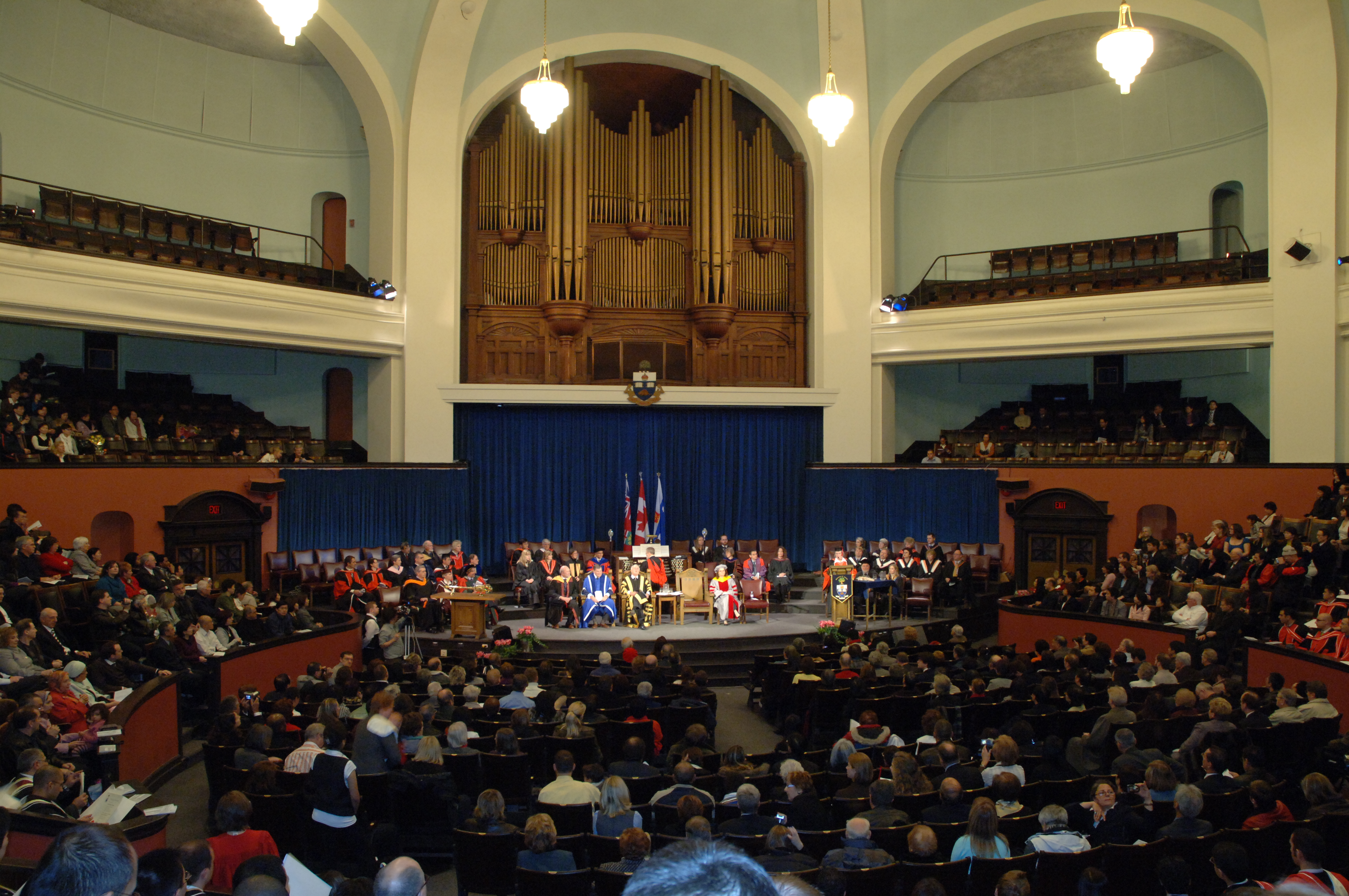
A University of Toronto convocation ceremony in Convocation Hall

This list of University of Toronto alumni includes notable graduates, non-graduate former students, and current students of the University of Toronto from its three campuses in the Greater Toronto Area of Ontario, Canada.

To avoid redundancy, alumni who hold or have held faculty positions in the University of Toronto are placed on this list of alumni, and do not appear on the list of faculty. Individuals are ordered by the year of their first degree from the university.

If the campus or college is known, it is indicated after degree years with shorthands listed below:

Mississauga

- University of Toronto Mississauga (UTM)

Scarborough

- University of Toronto Scarborough (UTSC)

St. George

- Innis College (Innis)
- Knox College (Knox)
- New College (New)
- Regis College (Regis)
- Trinity College (Trin.)
- University College (U.C.)
- University of St. Michael's College (St.M.)
- Victoria University (Vic.)
- Woodsworth College (Wdw.)
- Wycliffe College (Wyc.)

== Nobel laureates ==
- Frederick Banting (alumnus and former faculty) – Nobel Prize in Physiology or Medicine, 1923
- John Macleod (former faculty) – Nobel Prize in Physiology or Medicine, 1923
- Lester B. Pearson (alumnus Vic. and former faculty) – Nobel Peace Prize, 1957
- Arthur Leonard Schawlow ( Alumnae Vic.) – Nobel Prize in Physics, 1981
- John Charles Polanyi (faculty) – Nobel Prize in Chemistry, 1986
- Nadine Gordimer (former faculty) – Nobel Prize in Literature, 1991
- Bertram Brockhouse (alumnus) – Nobel Prize in Physics, 1994
- Walter Kohn (alumnus) – Nobel Prize in Chemistry, 1998
- James Orbinski (alumnus and faculty) – Nobel Peace Prize, 1999
- Oliver Smithies (former faculty) – Nobel Prize in Physiology or Medicine, 2007
- Geoffrey Hinton (faculty) – Nobel Prize in Physics, 2024
- Anne Carson (alumnus) – Nobel Prize in Literature, 2026

== Government ==
=== Heads of state and government ===
Name	Year	Notability
William Des Vœux	B.A. 1858	Governor of Fiji, 1880–85; governor of Newfoundland, 1886–87; governor of Hong Kong, 1887–91
William Lyon Mackenzie King	A.M. 1897	Prime minister of Canada (1935–48)
Vincent Massey	(U.C. 1910)	Governor general of Canada (1952–59)
Dame Eugenia Charles	B.A. 1946	2nd prime minister of Dominica, 1980–95
Noor Hassanali	LL.B. 1947	2nd president of Trinidad and Tobago, 1987–97
Vaira Vīķe-Freiberga	B.A. 1958 (Vic.), M.A. 1960	President of Latvia, 1999–2007
Lester B. Pearson	B.A. 1919 Vic., professor of history	14th prime minister of Canada
Adrienne Clarkson M.A. 1962, Ph.D. Vic., LLD Hon. 2001)	B.A. 1960 Trin., M.A. 1962, Ph.D.	26th governor general of Canada
Paul Martin	B.A. 1961 St.M., LL.B. 1965	21st prime minister of Canada
Stephen Harper	Attended college; did not graduate	22nd prime minister of Canada 2006–2015
Julie Payette	Master of Applied Science degree in computer engineering	29th governor general of Canada 2017–2021

=== International ===
- William Des Vœux (B.A. 1858) – governor of Fiji, 1880–85; governor of Newfoundland, 1886–87; governor of Hong Kong, 1887–91
- Hamar Greenwood, 1st Viscount Greenwood (B.A. 1895) – chief Sscretary for Ireland, 1920–22
- Sir Gilbert Parker, 1st Baronet – British propagandist and novelist; Member of Parliament for Gravesend, 1900–18
- Dame Eugenia Charles (B.A. 1946) – 2nd prime minister of Dominica, 1980–1995
- Rein Taagepera (B.A. Sc 1959) Member of the Estonian Constitutional Assembly, Estonian Presidential Candidate, founder of Res Publica Party, and founding dean of a new School of Social Sciences at the University of Tartu
- Maciej Giertych (Ph.D. 1962) – Polish member of the European Parliament, former Polish minister of education
- Liu Chao-shiuan (Ph.D. 1971) – 22nd premier of the Republic of China (Taiwan), former president of National Tsing Hua University and Soochow University
- Jennifer Roberts (M.A. 1984) mayor of Charlotte, North Carolina, 2015–2017
- John P. Walters (M.A. 1976) – director of the White House Office of National Drug Control Policy (colloquially "Drug Czar"), 2001–09
- Walter Ofonagoro (B.A. Trin., 1966) – scholar, politician, businessman, and former minister of information and culture, Federal Republic of Nigeria
- Margaret Kamar (Ph.D. 1992) – lecturer at Moi University, former minister of higher education science and technology, Kenya, former MP of Eldoret East, Kenya, and former senator of Uasin Gishu, Kenya

=== Governors-general and prime ministers ===
- William Lyon Mackenzie King (B.A. U.C., 1895, LL.B. 1896, M.A. 1897) – 10th prime minister of Canada
- Arthur Meighen (B.A. U.C., 1896) – 9th prime minister of Canada
- Vincent Massey (B.A. 1910 U.C.) – 18th and first Canadian-born governor general of Canada, philanthropist
- Lester B. Pearson (B.A. 1919 Vic., professor of history) – 14th prime minister of Canada
- Adrienne Clarkson (B.A.(Hons) 1960 Trin., M.A. 1962, Ph.D. Vic., LLD Hon. 2001) – 26th Governor General of Canada
- Paul Martin (B.A. 1961 St.M., LL.B. 1965) – 21st prime minister of Canada
- Stephen Harper (attended college; did not graduate) – 22nd prime minister of Canada
- Julie Payette (Master of Applied Science degree in computer engineering) – 29th governor general of Canada

=== Supreme Court judges ===
- John Douglas Armour (B.A. 1850) – Puisne Justice, 1902–03
- John Idington (LL.B. 1864) – Puisne Justice, 1905–27
- Albert Clements Killam (B.A. 1872) – Puisne Justice, 1903–05
- Lyman Poore Duff (B.A. 1887, LL.B. 1889) – Puisne Justice, 1906–33, Chief Justice, 1933–44
- John Henderson Lamont (B.A. 1892, LL.B. 1893) – Puisne Justice, 1927–1936
- Henry Hague Davis (B.A. 1907, M.A. 1909, LL.B. 1911) – Puisne Justice, 1935–44
- Wishart Flett Spence (B.A. 1925) – Puisne Justice, 1963–78
- Bora Laskin (B.A. 1933, M.A. 1935, LL.B. 1936) – puisne justice, 1970–73, chief justice, 1973–84
- Yves Pratte – Puisne Justice, 1977–79
- John Sopinka (B.A. 1955, LL.B. 1958) – Puisne Justice, 1988–97
- John C. Major (LL.B. 1957) – Puisne Justice, 1992–2005
- William Ian Corneil Binnie (LL.B. 1965) – Puisne Justice, 1998–2011
- Louis LeBel (LL.M. 1966) – Puisne Justice, 2000–14)
- Rosalie Abella (B.A. 1967, LL.B. 1970) – Puisne Justice, 2004–
- Michael J. Moldaver (B.A. 1968, LL.B. 1971) – Puisne Justice, 2011–
- Andromache Karakatsanis – Puisne Justice, 2011–
- Russell Brown – Puisne Justice, 2015–
- Nicholas Kasirer – Puisne Justice, 2019–

=== Lieutenant-governors, premiers, senators, and mayors ===
- John Morison Gibson (B.A. 1863 U.C., LL.D. 1869) – 9th lieutenant governor of Ontario
- William Mulock (B.A. 1863) – 14th lieutenant governor of Ontario
- William Barclay McMurrich (B.A. 1863, M.A. 1864) – 22nd mayor of Toronto
- Hugh John Macdonald (B.A. 1869) – 8th premier of Manitoba
- Oliver Aiken Howland (LL.B.) – 31st mayor of Toronto
- McLeod Stewart (M.A.) – mayor of Ottawa, 1887–88
- James Albert Manning Aikins (B.A. 1875) – 9th lieutenant governor of Manitoba, founder of the Canadian Bar Association
- Frederick W. A. G. Haultain (B.A. 1879) – 1st premier of the Northwest Territories
- Arthur Sifton (B.A. 1880 Vic.) – 2nd premier of Alberta
- Emerson Coatsworth (LL.B. 1886) – 33rd mayor of Toronto
- William Short (LL.B.) – mayor of Edmonton, 1901–04
- Thomas Russ Deacon (B.A.Sc. 1891) – mayor of Winnipeg, 1913–14
- Herbert Alexander Bruce (M.B. 1892) – 15th lieutenant governor of Ontario
- Kenneth W. MacKenzie (B.A. 1893) – mayor of Edmonton, 1899–1901
- Howard Ferguson (B.A.) – 9th premier of Ontario
- George Stewart Henry (B.A., LL.B.) – 10th premier of Ontario
- George Reginald Geary (LL.B. 1896) – 35th mayor of Toronto
- Roland Fairbairn McWilliams (B.A. 1896) – lieutenant governor of Manitoba, 1940–53
- Harry Marshall Erskine Evans (B.A. 1897) – mayor of Edmonton, 1917–18
- Louis Orville Breithaupt (B.A.) – 18th lieutenant governor of Ontario
- Harold Fisher (B.A.) – mayor of Ottawa, 1917–20
- Freeman Ferrier Treleaven (B.A.) – mayor of Hamilton, Ontario, 1926–27
- John Alexander Douglas McCurdy (B.A.Sc. 1906) – lieutenant governor of Nova Scotia, first person to fly an airplane in the British Empire
- Frederick Warriner (D.D.S. 1907) – mayor of Winnipeg, 1937, mayor of Winnipeg Beach, 1931–36
- John Edward Brownlee (B.A. 1908 Vic.) – 5th premier of Alberta
- Gordon Daniel Conant (B.A.) – 12th premier of Ontario
- Leonard Outerbridge (LL.B.) – 2nd lieutenant governor of Newfoundland and Labrador
- Harry Nixon (B.Sc. OAC) – 13th premier of Ontario
- William Ross Macdonald (B.A. 1914) – 21st lieutenant governor of Ontario, solicitor-general of Canada
- George A. Drew (B.A. 1916) – 14th premier of Ontario and high commissioner of Canada in London
- Leslie Frost (B.A.) – 16th premier of Ontario
- Grant MacEwan (B.Sc. 1926 OAC) – 9th lieutenant governor of Alberta
- Errick Willis (B.A.) – lieutenant governor of Manitoba, 1960–65, member of the Canadian curling team that won a gold medal in the 1932 Winter Olympics
- Pauline Mills McGibbon (B.A. 1933 Vic.) – 22nd lieutenant governor of Ontario
- Kieth Hymmen (B.Sc.) – mayor of Kitchener, Ontario, 1963–65
- Fabian O'Dea (M.A.) – 4th lieutenant governor of Newfoundland and Labrador
- John Black Aird (B.A. 1945 Trin.) – 23rd lieutenant governor of Ontario; senator, 1964–74
- Vincent Dantzer (M.A.) – mayor of Edmonton, 1965–68
- Robert Gordon Robertson (Ph.D.) – 7th commissioner of the Northwest Territories
- Bill Davis (B.A. 1951) – 18th premier of Ontario
- Landon Pearson (B.A. 1951 Trin.) senator
- Hal Jackman (B.A. 1953 Vic., LL.B. 1956) – 25th lieutenant governor of Ontario, financier and philanthropist
- Ross Alger (M.B.A.) – mayor of Calgary, 1977–80
- Marilyn Trenholme Counsell (M.D.) – lieutenant governor of New Brunswick, 1997–2003
- Allan Higdon (B.Ed.) – mayor of Ottawa, 2000–01
- Edward Roberts (B.A. 1960, LL.B. 1964) – 11th lieutenant governor of Newfoundland and Labrador
- John Sewell (B.A. 1961, LL.B. 1964) – 58th mayor of Toronto
- David Peterson (LL.B. 1967) – 20th premier of Ontario
- Don Cousens (B.D. Knox) – mayor of Markham, Ontario, 1994–2006
- Bob Rae (B.A. 1969, LL.B. 1977) – 21st premier of Ontario, 5th leader of the Ontario New Democratic Party
- David Onley (B.A. 1975 UTSC) – 28th lieutenant governor of Ontario
- Susan Fennell (B.Sc. UTM, 1977) – mayor of Brampton, Ontario, founder and commissioner of the National Women's Hockey League
- David Miller (LL.B. 1984) – 63rd mayor of Toronto
- Kathleen Wynne (M.A. 1980; M.Ed. 1995) – 25th premier of Ontario
- John Tory (B.A. 1975 Trin.) – 65th mayor of Toronto, leader of the Progressive Conservative Party of Ontario, 2005–07
- Olivia Chow (B.A. 1979) – 66th mayor of Toronto, former NDP member of Parliament and city councillor

=== Ministers, diplomats, party leaders and other political figures ===
- J. Waldo Monteith (Trin.) – minister of national health and welfare, 1957–63; first minister of amateur sport, 1961–63; member of the House of Commons of Canada for Perth, 1953–72
- Ron Moeser (BA) – Toronto city councillor for Ward 44 Scarborough East in Toronto, Ontario, Canada
- William F. Bell (BA) – mayor of Richmond Hill, Ontario
- Adam Crooks (LL.B.) – treasurer of Ontario, 1872–77, attorney general of Ontario, 1871–72, member of the Legislative Assembly of Ontario for Toronto West, 1871–74
- Robert Alexander Harrison (B.C.L. 1855, D.C.L. 1859 Trin.) – member of Parliament for West Toronto, 1867–72
- Arthur Matheson (B.A. Trin.) – treasurer of Ontario, 1905–13, member of the Legislative Assembly of Ontario for Lanark South, 1898–1913
- Thomas Moss (B.A. 1858, M.A. 1859) – member of Parliament for West Toronto, 1873–75, chief justice of Ontario, 1878–80
- James Wellington McLaughlin (B.A.) – member of the Legislative Assembly of Ontario for Durham West, 1879–90
- William Lount (LL.B.) – member of Parliament for Toronto Centre, 1896–97, former justice in the Common Pleas division of the Supreme Court of Ontario
- Thomas Dixon Craig (B.A.) – member of Parliament, 1891–1900, as an independent Conservative member
- James Joseph Foy (B.A. St.M.) – attorney general of Ontario, 1905–14, member of the Legislative Assembly of Ontario for Toronto South, 1898–1916
- Richard Harcourt (B.A.) – treasurer of Ontario, 1890–99, member of the Legislative Assembly of Ontario for Monck, 1879–1908
- William Ralph Meredith (LL.B. 1872) – leader of the Progressive Conservative Party of Ontario, 1878–94
- Allen Bristol Aylesworth (B.A. 1874, M.A. 1875) – minister of justice, 1906–11, minister of labour, 1905–06, postmaster general of Canada, 1905–06
- Sam Hughes (B.A.) – minister of militia and defence, 1911–16, member of Parliament for Victoria, 1904–21
- Clifford Sifton (B.A. 1875 Vic.) – minister of the interior, 1896–1905
- William Findlay Maclean (B.A.) – member of Parliament for York South, 1904–26, and York East, 1892–1904
- Alfred Henry Clarke (LL.B.) – member of Parliament for Essex South, 1904–17, member of the Liberal Party of Canada
- James Alexander Lougheed (B.A.) – leader of the Government in the Senate, 1911–21, leader of the Opposition in the Senate, 1906–11, 1921–25
- Robert Allan Pyne (B.A.) – Ontario minister of education, 1914–18, member of the Legislative Assembly of Ontario for Toronto Northeast, 1898–1918
- William Barton Northrup (B.A. 1877, M.A. 1878) – clerk of the House of Commons, 1918–24, member of Parliament for Hastings East, 1892–96
- Thomas Chisholm (M.D. 1879) – member of Parliament for Huron East, 1904–11, member of the Conservative Party of Canada
- William James Roche (M.B. Trin.) – minister of Indian Affairs and Northern Development, 1912–17, secretary of state for Canada, 1911–12
- Robert Franklin Sutherland (B.A.) – speaker of the House of Commons of Canada, 1905–09, member of Parliament for Essex North, 1900–09
- Hartley Dewart (B.A.) – leader of the Ontario Liberal Party, 1919–21
- J. S. Woodsworth (B.A. Vic.) – first leader of the Co-operative Commonwealth Federation (later became the New Democratic Party), 1932–42
- Edmund James Bristol (B.A. 1883) – member of Parliament for Toronto East Centre, 1925–26, and Toronto Centre, 1905–25
- John Taylor Gilmour (M.D. Trin.) – member of the Legislative Assembly of Ontario for York West, 1886–94
- Alexander Grant MacKay (M.B.A.) – leader of the Ontario Liberal Party, 1907–11, member of the Legislative Assembly of Alberta for Athabasca, 1913–20
- Isaac Benson Lucas (B.A.) – attorney general of Ontario, 1914–19, treasurer of Ontario, 1913–14
- Henry John Cody (B.A.) – Ontario minister of education, 1918–19
- Thomas Erlin Kaiser (M.D. 1890) – member of Parliament for Ontario, 1925–30
- William Henry Moore (B.A. 1894) – former member of Parliament for Ontario, member of the Liberal Party of Canada
- William Thomas White (B.A. 1895) – minister of finance and receiver general, 1911–19, member of Parliament for Leeds, 1911–21
- Morley Currie (M.D. 1895) – member of Parliament, 1908–11, member of the Legislative Assembly of Ontario for Prince Edward, 1902–08
- Frank Trafford Taylor (B.A.) – Canadian lawyer and past president of the Manitoba Liberal Party
- Manning Doherty (B.Sc. 1895 OAC) – leader of the United Farmers of Ontario, 1924–25, vice-president of the Toronto Stock Exchange, 1938
- Edmond Proulx (M.A. St.M.) – member of Parliament for Prescott, 1904–21, member of the Legislative Assembly of Ontario for Prescott, 1923–29
- W. E. N. Sinclair (LL.B.) – leader of the Ontario Liberal Party, 1923–30
- William Herbert Price (B.A.) – attorney general of Ontario, 1926–34, treasurer of Ontario, 1923–26, member of the Legislative Assembly of Ontario for Parkdale, 1914–37
- James Rutherford (M.B.) – member of Parliament for Kent, 1926–39, member of the Liberal Party of Canada
- George Arthur Welsh (B.Ed.) – provincial secretary and registrar of Ontario, 1949–55, member of the Legislative Assembly of Ontario for Muskoka—Ontario, 1945–55
- C. C. Downey (B.A.) – chairman of the Toronto Transit Commission, 1960–63
- William James Dunlop (B.A.) – Ontario Minister of Education, 1951–59, Member of the Legislative Assembly of Ontario for Eglinton, 1951–61
- Harold Timmins (B.A.) – Member of Parliament for Parkdale, 1946–49, member of the Progressive Conservative Party of Canada
- John Campbell Elliott (B.A. Trin.) – Minister of Public Works, 1926–30, Minister of Labour, 1926, postmaster general of Canada, 1935–39
- H. H. Wrong (B.A., professor of history) – Canadian ambassador to the United States, 1946–53
- Paul Martin Sr. (B.A. 1925) – senator for Windsor-Walkerville, Ontario, 1968–74, Member of Parliament for Essex East, 1935–68
- H.H. Hannam (B.Sc. 1926 OAC) – general secretary of the United Farmers of Ontario, 1933–42, former president and managing director of the Canadian Federation of Agriculture
- Escott Reid (B.A. 1927 Trin.) – Canadian High Commissioner to India, 1952–57, director of the South-Asia and Middle Eastern Department of the World Bank, 1962–65
- Victor Railton (M.B.) – Member of Parliament for Welland, 1972–79, member of the Liberal Party of Canada
- Charles Herbert Little (B.A. 1930 Trin.) – director of Naval Intelligence during the Second World War, recipient of the Queen's Jubilee Medal
- John Yaremko (B.A.) – Provincial Secretary and Registrar of Ontario, 1960–66, Member of the Legislative Assembly of Ontario for Bellwoods, 1951–75
- E. Herbert Norman (B.A. Vic.) – Canadian Ambassador to Japan, 1946–50
- Ted Jolliffe (B.A. Vic.) – first leader of the Ontario Co-operative Commonwealth Federation, 1942–53, leader of the Official Opposition in the Ontario Legislature
- George Hees (B.A.) – Minister of Transport, 1957–60, Member of Parliament for Broadview, 1950–62
- Alfred Hales (B.Sc. 1934 OAC) – Member of Parliament for Wellington, 1968–74, and Wellington South, 1957–68
- Frederick Robertson (M.D.) – Member of Parliament for Northumberland, 1949–57, member of the Liberal Party of Canada
- George Ignatieff (B.A. 1936 Trin.) – Canadian Ambassador to the United Nations, 1966–68; president of the United Nations Security Council, 1968–69
- Saul Rae (B.A. 1936 U.C.) – Canadian Ambassador to the United Nations, 1972–76
- John Kenneth Macalister (B.A. 1937 U.C.) – Special Operations Executive operative in the Second World War
- Hu Harries (M.A.) – Member of Parliament for Edmonton-Strathcona
- Martin O'Connell (M.A., Ph.D.) – Minister of Labour, 1972, 1978–79, Member of Parliament for Scarborough East, 1968–72
- James H. Aitchison (Ph.D.) – Leader of the New Democratic Party of Nova Scotia, 1963–68
- Alastair Gillespie (M.Comm.) – member of Parliament for Etobicoke
- Judy LaMarsh (B.A. Vic.) – secretary of state for Canada, 1965–68, Minister of National Health and Welfare, 1963–65
- James McNulty (B.A.) – Member of Parliament for St. Catharines, 1968–72, and Lincoln, 1962–68, member of the Liberal Party of Canada
- Marion Bryden (M.A.) – Member of the Legislative Assembly of Ontario, 1975–90, Member of Parliament for Beaches—Woodbine, 1975–90
- Joe Greene (B.A.) – Minister of Energy, Mines and Resources, 1968–72, Member of Parliament for Niagara Falls, 1968–72
- James Auld (B.A.) – Minister of Colleges and Universities, 1974–75, Ontario Minister of the Environment, 1972–74
- René Brunelle (M.A.) – provincial secretary for Resources Development of Ontario, 1977–81, member of the Legislative Assembly of Ontario for Cochrane North, 1958–81
- Andy Thompson (dropped out) – Leader of the Ontario Liberal Party, 1964–66
- Bette Stephenson (M.D. 1946) – member of the Legislative Assembly of Ontario for York Mills, 1975–87
- Harry Craig Parrott (D.D.S. 1947) – Ontario minister of the environment, 1978–81, Ontario minister of colleges and universities, 1975–78
- Royce Frith (B.A.) – Canadian high commissioner to the United Kingdom, 1994–96, leader of the opposition in the Senate of Canada, 1991–93
- Morton Shulman (M.D. 1948) – member of the Legislative Assembly of Ontario, 1967–75, member of the New Democratic Party
- Paul Hellyer (B.A. 1949) – first leader of the Canadian Action Party, 1997–2004
- Elizabeth Joan Smith (B.A. St.M.) – solicitor general of Ontario, 1987–89, member of the Ontario Liberal Party
- Denis Lazure (B.A.) – member of the National Assembly of Quebec for La Prairie, 1989–96, Bertrand, 1981–84, and Chambly, 1976–81
- Tom Angus (M.Sc. 1950) – alderman, Sault Ste. Marie, 1960–1991
- Stanley Haidasz (M.B. 1951) – member of Parliament for Parkdale, 1962–78, member of Parliament for Trinity, 1957–58
- Daniel G. Hill (M.A., 1951; Ph.D., 1960, Sociology) – founding head of the Ontario Human Rights Commission
- Donald S. Macdonald (B.A. 1952 Trin.) – Mmnister of national defence, 1970–72; president of the Privy Council, 1968–70; Canadian high commissioner to the United Kingdom, 1988–91
- Max Yalden (B.A. 1952 Vic.) – commissioner of official languages, 1977–1984
- Robert Nixon (B.Ed.) – leader of the Ontario Liberal Party, 1967–75, 1990–91, treasurer of Ontario, 1985–90
- Reuben Baetz (LL.B.) – Ontario minister of intergovernmental affairs, 1985–87, Ontario minister of tourism and recreation, 1982–85, provincial secretary for justice of Ontario, 1985
- Jesse Flis (B.A., M.Ed.) – member of Parliament for Parkdale—High Park, 1979–84, 1993–97, member of the Liberal Party of Canada
- Bud Cullen (B.A. 1954) – Federal Court judge, Minister of National Revenue, 1975–76
- Roy McMurtry (B.A. 1954 Trin.) – Canadian high commissioner to the United Kingdom, 1985–88, chief justice of Ontario, 1996–, chancellor of York University, 2008–
- Laurier LaPierre (B.A. 1955 St.M., M.A. 1957, Ph.D. 1962) – senator, member of the Liberal Party of Canada, Officer of the Order of Canada
- Bill Saunderson (B.A. 1956 Trin.) – Ontario Minister of Economic Development, Trade and Tourism, 1995–97
- Ian Scott (B.A. St.M.) – attorney general of Ontario, 1985–90, member of the Legislative Assembly of Ontario for St. David, 1985–87, and St. George—St. David, 1987–92
- Nick Leluk (B.A.) – Ontario Minister of Correctional Services, 1981–85, member of the Progressive Conservative Party of Ontario
- Julian Porter (B.A.) – chairman of the Toronto Transit Commission, 1979–87, former president of the Canadian National Exhibition
- John Reimer (B.A.) – member of Parliament for Kitchener, 1979–80, 1984–93
- Terry Grier (B.A. 1958 Trin.) – Member of Parliament for Etobicoke–Lakeshore, 1972–74, president of Ryerson Polytechnical Institute, 1988–95
- Ruth Grier (B.A. 1958 Trin.) – Ontario minister of the environment 1990–93, Ontario minister of health 93–95, member of Parliament for Etobicoke—Lakeshore 1987–95
- Bob Kaplan (B.A. 1958) – member of Parliament for York Centre, 1974–93, and Don Valley, 1968–72
- Ed Broadbent (B.A. 1959 Trin.) – Leader of the New Democratic Party, 1975–89
- John Oostrom (B.A. 1959, M.B.A.) – member of Parliament for Willowdale, 1984–88, member of the Progressive Conservative Party of Canada
- Michael Wilson (B.A. 1959 Trin.) – 22nd Canadian ambassador to the United States, 2006–09; Minister of Finance, 1984–91
- Gerry Martiniuk (M.A.) – member of the Legislative Assembly of Ontario, 2007–, member of the Progressive Conservative Party of Ontario
- Yuri Shymko (B.A.) – member of Parliament for Parkdale—High Park, 1978–79, member of the Progressive Conservative Party of Canada
- Bill Graham (B.A. 1961 Trin.) – Minister of Foreign Affairs, 2002–03; minister of national defence, 2004–06; leader of the Liberal Party of Canada, 2006
- Bruce McCaffrey (B.A.) – Ontario minister of community and social services, 1983, member of the Legislative Assembly of Ontario for Armourdale, 1977–87
- Christine Stewart (B.Sc.N.) – minister of the environment, 1997–99, secretary of state (Latin America and Africa), 1993–97
- Alfred Stong (B.A.) – member of the Legislative Assembly of Ontario for York Centre, 1975–81, judge in the Ontario Superior Court of Justice
- Ron Duhamel (M.A., Ph.D.) – Minister of Veterans Affairs, 2000–02, member of Parliament for Saint Boniface, 1988–2002
- Mark MacGuigan (Ph.D.) – Minister of Justice, 1982–84, Secretary of State for External Affairs, 1980–82, member of Parliament for Windsor—Walkerville, 1968–84
- Barbara McDougall (B.A. 1963) – Minister responsible for the Status of Women, 1986–90, member of Parliament for St. Paul's, 1984–93
- Bob Wong (B.A.) – Ontario Minister of Citizenship and Immigration, 1989–90, Ontario minister of energy, 1987–89
- Michael Cassidy (B.A. Trin.) – leader of the Ontario New Democratic Party, 1978–82
- Dan Hays (LL.B.) – leader of the Opposition in the Senate of Canada, 2006–07, speaker of the Senate of Canada, 2001–05, senator Alberta, 1984–2007
- Michael Kergin (B.A. 1965) – 19th Canadian ambassador to the United States
- Barbara Greene (B.A. 1966 St.M.) – member of Parliament for Don Valley North, 1988–93, member of the Progressive Conservative Party of Canada
- Carole Taylor (B.A. Vic.) – Minister of Finance of British Columbia, 2005–08, member of the Legislative Assembly of British Columbia for Vancouver-Langara, 2005–08
- John Godfrey (B.A. 1967 Trin.) – member of Parliament for Don Valley West, 1993–2008
- Bev Oda (B.A.) – Minister for International Cooperation, 2007–, Minister of Canadian Heritage, 2006–07, member of Parliament for Durham, 2004–
- Connie Fogal (M.A.) – Leader of the Canadian Action Party, 2004–08
- Avi Lewis (B.A. 1988) – politician and former journalist
- Stephen Lewis (dropped out) – Leader of the Ontario New Democratic Party, 1970–78
- Michael Prue (B.A. UTSC) – Toronto City Councillor, 1998–2001, member of Parliament for Beaches—East York, 2001–
- Greg Sorbara (dropped out) – Ontario Minister of Finance, 2003–05, 2006–07, Ontario Minister of Labour, 1987–89
- Walter McLean (M.Div. Knox) – secretary of state for Canada, 1984–85, member of Parliament for Waterloo, 1979–93
- John Hastings (M.A. 1967) – member of the Legislative Assembly of Ontario for Etobicoke North, 1999–2003, member of the Progressive Conservative Party of Ontario
- John Bosley (B.A. 1968 Trin.) – Speaker of the House of Commons of Canada, 1984–86, member of Parliament for Don Valley West, 1979–93
- Doug Frith (B.Pharm. 1968) – minister of Indian Affairs and Northern Development, 1984, member of Parliament for Sudbury, 1980–88
- Graham Fraser (B.A. 1968, M.A. 1972) – Canada's 6th commissioner of Official Languages
- Michael Ignatieff (B.A. 1969 Trin.) – leader of the Liberal Party of Canada, 2008–, director of Carr Center for Human Rights Policy at John F. Kennedy School of Government, 2000–05
- Steven W. Langdon (B.A. 1969 Trin.) – member of Parliament, 1984–93, member of the New Democratic Party
- Patrick Boyer (M.A., LL.B.) – member of Parliament for Etobicoke-Lakeshore, 1984–93, member of the Progressive Conservative Party of Canada
- Joe Volpe (B.A. 1970, B.Ed. 1971, M.Ed. 1980) – member of Parliament for Eglinton—Lawrence, 1988–
- David Berger (B.A. 1971) – Canadian Ambassador to Israel, 1995–99, member of Parliament for Saint-Henri—Westmount, 1988–94
- Tom Wappel (B.A. 1971) – member of Parliament for Scarborough Southwest, 1997–2008, and Scarborough West, 1988–97
- Alan Tonks (M.Ed.) – member of Parliament for York South-Weston, 2000–11, 6th Metro Toronto chairman, 1987–97
- Garth Turner (B.A.) – Minister of National Revenue, 1993, Member of Parliament for Halton, 2006–08, Member of Parliament for Halton—Peel, 1988–93
- Peggy Nash (B.A.) – president of the New Democratic Party of Canada, 2009–, Member of Parliament for Parkdale—High Park, 2006–08
- Jim Wiseman (B.A.) – Member of the Legislative Assembly of Ontario for Durham West, 1990–95, member of the Ontario New Democratic Party
- Howard Hampton (B.Ed.) – Leader of the Ontario New Democratic Party, 1996–2009
- Maria Minna (B.A.) – Minister for International Cooperation, 1999–2002, Member of Parliament for Beaches—East York, 1997–
- Sarmite Bulte (B.A. U.C.) – Member of Parliament for Parkdale—High Park, 1997–2006
- Carolyn Bennett (M.D. 1974) – Member of Parliament for Toronto—St. Paul's, 1997–2023, member of the Liberal Party of Canada, Minister of Indigenous and Northern Affairs, 2015–2021
- Bryon Wilfert (B.A., M.A., B.Ed.) – Member of Parliament for Richmond Hill, 2004–2011, Member of Parliament for Oak Ridges, 1997–2004
- Ted Morton (M.A. 1975, Ph.D. 1981) – Minister of Sustainable Resource Development in the Alberta government, 2006–2010, Member of the Legislative Assembly of Alberta, 2004–2012
- Ross Hornby (M.A. 1976) – Canadian Ambassador to the European Union, 2006–
- Alex Himelfarb (Ph.D.) – Canadian Ambassador to Italy, 2006–
- Jeffrey S. Lyons (J.D.) – chairman of the Toronto Transit Commission, 1987–89, former chairman of Gray Coach and Trentway-Wagar
- Wayne Arthurs (B.Ed.) – Member of the Legislative Assembly of Ontario for Pickering—Scarborough East, 2007–, member of the Ontario Liberal Party
- Martha Hall Findlay (B.A.) – lawyer, Member of Parliament for Willowdale, 2008–
- Jim Karygiannis (B.ASc.) – Member of Parliament for Scarborough—Agincourt, 1988–, member of the Liberal Party of Canada
- Rob Oliphant (B.Comm. 1978) – Member of Parliament for Don Valley West, 2008–, member of the Liberal Party of Canada
- Rosario Marchese (B.A. 1978, B.Ed.) – Member of the Legislative Assembly of Ontario for Trinity-Spadina, 1999–, member of the New Democratic Party of Ontario
- Chris Bentley (LL.B. 1979) – attorney general of Ontario, 2007–, member of the Legislative Assembly of Ontario for London West, 2003–
- Leona Dombrowsky (B.A. 1979) – Ontario Minister of Agriculture, Food and Rural Affairs, 2005–, Member of the Legislative Assembly of Ontario for Prince Edward—Hastings, 2007–
- Kathleen Wynne (M.A. 1980) – Ontario Minister of Education, 2006–, Member of the Legislative Assembly of Ontario for Don Valley West, 2003–, Premier of Ontario, 2013–
- Marie Bountrogianni (M.Ed. 1980) – Member of the Legislative Assembly of Ontario, 1999–2007, member of the Ontario Liberal Party
- Tony Ianno (B.Sc.) – Member of Parliament for Trinity-Spadina, 1993–2006, Minister of Families and Caregivers, 2004–06
- Tony Silipo (B.A.) – Ontario Minister of Community and Social Services, 1993–95, Ontario Minister of Education, 1991–93, chair of the Management Board, 1991–92
- Borys Wrzesnewskyj (B.Comm. Trin.) – Member of Parliament for Etobicoke Centre, 2004–, member of the Liberal Party of Canada
- Paul Christie (BA 1974 UTSC, Ph.D.) – chairman of the Toronto Transit Commission, 1994–98, member of Toronto City Council, Metropolitan Toronto Council, and provincial supervisor of the Toronto District School Board
- Margarett Best (B.A. UTSC) – former Member of Provincial Parliament for Scarborough–Guildwood
- Joseph Cordiano (B.A.) – Ontario Minister for Economic Development and Trade, 2003–06, Member of the Legislative Assembly of Ontario for York South—Weston, 1999–2006
- Tony Clement (B.A. 1983, LL.B. 1986) – Minister of Industry, 2008–, Minister of Health, 2006–08, Member of Parliament for Parry Sound-Muskoka, 2006–
- Alfred Apps (LL.B. 1984) – president of the Liberal Party of Canada, 2009–
- Lorenzo Berardinetti (B.A.) – Member of the Legislative Assembly of Ontario for Scarborough Southwest, 2003–, member of the Ontario Liberal Party
- Tim Murphy (LL.B.) – Chief of Staff of the Prime Minister's Office, 2003–06, Member of the Legislative Assembly of Ontario for St. George—St. David, 1993–95
- Bob Dechert (LL.B.) – Member of Parliament for Mississauga—Erindale, 2008–, member of the Conservative Party of Canada
- Jim Wilson (B.A. St.M.) – Ontario Minister of Northern Development and Mines, 2002–03, Ontario Minister of Health, 1995–97
- Shelley Martel (B.A.) – Member of the Legislative Assembly of Ontario for Sudbury East, 1987–99, member of the Ontario New Democratic Party
- Peter Van Loan (B.A. 1987, M.A. 1989, M.Sc. 1993) – Minister of Intergovernmental Affairs, 2006–07, president of the Queen's Privy Council for Canada, 2006–07
- Dan Newman (B.A. 1987 U.C.) – Ontario Minister of Northern Development and Mines, 2001–02, Ontario Minister of the Environment, 2000–01
- Kirsty Duncan (B.A. 1988) – Member of Parliament for Etobicoke North, 2008–, member of the Liberal Party of Canada, Minister of Science (Canada), 2015–
- Shafiq Qaadri (M.D. 1988) – Member of the Legislative Assembly of Ontario for Etobicoke North, 2003–, member of the Ontario Liberal Party
- Mary Anne Chambers (B.Comm. 1988 UTSC) – Member of the Legislative Assembly of Ontario for Scarborough East, 2003–07, member of the Ontario Liberal Party
- Roy MacLaren (M.Div. 1991 Trin.) – Canadian High Commissioner to the United Kingdom, 1996–2000, Member of Parliament for Etobicoke North, 1979–84, 1988–96
- Monique Smith (B.A.) – Ontario Minister of Tourism, 2008–, Member of the Legislative Assembly of Ontario for Nipissing, 2003–
- Jason Dearborn (B.A. 1994 Trin., M.Div. 1996 Trin.) – Member of the Legislative Assembly of Saskatchewan for Kindersley, 2002–07, member of the Saskatchewan Party
- Michael Chong (B.A. 1994 Trin.) – Member of Parliament for Wellington—Halton Hills, 2004–, president of the Queen's Privy Council for Canada, 2006
- Mark Holland (B.A. 1996) – Member of Parliament for Ajax—Pickering, 2004–, member of the Liberal Party of Canada
- Patrick Brown (B.A.) – Leader of the Progressive Conservative Party of Ontario, 2015–18, mayor of Brampton, 2018–, MPP, 2015–18, Member of Parliament for Barrie, 2006–15, president of the Progressive Conservative Youth Federation, 1998–2002
- Dale Kirby (Ph.D 2003 OISE/UT) – Member of the House of Assembly of Newfoundland and Labrador for St. John's North, 2011–
- Tevita Hala Palefau (Ph.D 2005 OISE/UT) – Minister for Education, Member of Parliament, and Member of Privy Council and Cabinet, Tonga, 2005–2010
- Vivian Bercovici (LL.B., 1988) – former Canadian Ambassador to Israel, 2014–2016
- Mary Ng (BA, UTSC. 1996) – [Minister of Small Business, Export Promotion and International Trade], 2018–
- Jane Philpott (MPH 2012) – Member of Parliament for Markham—Stouffville, 2015–19, Minister of Health, 2015–17, Minister of Indigenous Services, 2017–19, president of the Treasury Board, 2019
- Peter Milczyn (B.Arch. 1989) – politician
- Fares Al Soud (B.Sc. UTM) – Member of Parliament for Mississauga Centre
- Bill Blair (BA 1980 UTSC) – former member of Parliament Scarborough Southwest (2015–2026), former Minister of National Defence (2023–2025), former Chief of Toronto Police Service (2005–2015), former Minister of Public Safety and Emergency Preparedness (2019–2021)
- Mae Brown (1972 UTSC) – first deaf-blind Canadian to earn a university degree; head of deaf-blind affairs with the Canadian National Institute for the Blind
- Glenn De Baeremaeker (BA 1985 UTSC) – former city councillor of Ward 38 (former one of two Scarborough Centre wards) in Toronto (2003–2018), former deputy speaker of the City of Toronto, and former deputy mayor for Toronto East
- Adrian Foster (BA 1983 UTSC) – three-term mayor of the City of Clarington, Ontario; recipient of the Queen Elizabeth II Golden Jubilee Medal for his community service
- Goldie Ghamari (BA 2008 UTSC) – current Member of Provincial Parliament for Carleton, chair of Standing Committee on General Government
- Mitzie Hunter (BA 1999 UTSC) – former member of Provincial Parliament for Scarborough Guildwood, former associate minister of Finance, former minister of Education, and former Minister of Advanced Education and Skills Development
- Laura Mae Lindo (BA 1998 UTSC) – former member of Provincial Parliament for Kitchener Centre, critic on Anti-Racism, Colleges & Universities, and citizenship and immigration
- John McKay (UTSC) – Member of Parliament for Scarborough Guildwood (2004–present), former Member of Parliament for Scarborough East (1997–2004), former Parliamentary Secretary to the Minister of Finance (2003–2006), former Parliamentary Secretary to the Minister of Defense (2015–2017)
- Jennifer McKelvie (B.Sc. 2000 UTSC) – Member of Parliament for Ajax, former Toronto city councillor for Scarborough-Rouge Park (2018–2025) and deputy mayor of the City of Toronto (2022–2025)
- Vijay Thanigasalam (UTSC) – Associate Minister of Transportation of Ontario and former member of Provincial Parliament nondegreed)
- Bryon J. Wilfert (BA 1975 UTSC) – former member of Parliament for Richmond Hill, consul general of Myanmar and recipient of the Order of the Rising Sun
- Melissa Lantsman (BA 2006 UTSG) - Member of Parliament for Thornhill (2021 -) and Co-Deputy Leader of His Majesty's Loyal Opposition (2022-)

== Natural sciences, mathematics, medicine and engineering ==
=== Mathematics and statistics ===
- John Charles Fields (B.A. 1884 U.C., professor of mathematics 1902–32) – mathematician and founder of the Fields Medal
- Robert H. Coats (B.A. 1896 U.C., visiting professor of statistics) – Canada's first Dominion Statistician
- Herbert Marshall (B.A. 1915) – statistician, academic, Canada's third Dominion Statistician
- Samuel Beatty (Ph.D. 1915) – mathematician and educator, Beatty sequence is named after him, 21st chancellor of the University of Toronto
- Cecilia Krieger (B.A. 1924, M.A. 1925, Ph.D. 1930) – mathematician, first woman to earn a Ph.D. in mathematics in Canada
- Gilbert de Beauregard Robinson (B.A. 1927) – mathematician in combinatorics and representation theory of the symmetric groups, known for the Robinson–Schensted correspondence
- Albert W. Tucker (B.A. 1928) – mathematician; co-discoverer of the Karush–Kuhn–Tucker conditions
- Israel Halperin (B.A. 1932 Vic.) – mathematician, social activist, fellow of the Royal Society of Canada, Henry Marshall Tory Medal recipient
- Nathan Mendelsohn (B.A., M.A., Ph.D. 1941) – mathematician, former president of the Canadian Mathematical Society, fellow of the Royal Society of Canada, winner of the Henry Marshall Tory Medal
- Cecil J. Nesbitt (B.A. 1934, M.A. 1935, Ph.D. 1937) – mathematician, co-discoverer of the Schuette–Nesbitt formula
- J. Carson Mark (Ph.D. 1938) – mathematician, noted for his work on developing nuclear weapons for the United States at Los Alamos National Laboratory
- Irving Kaplansky (B.A. 1938, M.A. 1940) – mathematician, member of the National Academy of Sciences and the American Academy of Arts and Sciences, former director of the Mathematical Sciences Research Institute and president of the American Mathematical Society
- Chia-Chiao Lin (M.Sc. 1941) – applied mathematician, Institute Professor emeritus at the Massachusetts Institute of Technology, former president of the Society for Industrial and Applied Mathematics
- Cathleen Synge Morawetz (B.A. 1945) – mathematician, professor emerita at the Courant Institute of Mathematical Sciences at the New York University, former president of the American Mathematical Society, the National Medal of Science winner
- Leo Moser (M.Sc. 1945) – mathematician, best known for his Moser polygon notation
- Robert Steinberg (Ph.D. 1948) – mathematician, professor emeritus of mathematics at the University of California, Los Angeles, winner of the Steele Prize and Jeffery–Williams Prize, member of the National Academy of Sciences
- Donald B. Gillies (B.A. 1950) – mathematician and computer scientist known for his work in game theory, computer design, and minicomputer programming environments
- Laurent C. Siebenmann (B.Sc.) – professor of mathematics at the Université de Paris-Sud at Orsay, co-discoverer of the Kirby–Siebenmann class, winner of the Jeffery–Williams Prize
- James Arthur (B.Sc., M.Sc.) – former president of the American Mathematical Society
- Jerrold E. Marsden (B.Sc.) – American applied mathematician, the Carl F. Braun Professor of Engineering and Control & Dynamic Systems at the California Institute of Technology
- John Benedetto (Ph.D. 1964) – professor of mathematics at the University of Maryland, College Park, director of the Norbert Wiener Center for Harmonic Analysis and Applications
- Robert Moody (M.A. 1964, Ph.D. 1966) – mathematician, co-discoverer of Kac–Moody algebra, fellow of the Royal Society of Canada
- John Friedlander (B.Sc. 1965) – mathematician in analytic number theory
- Norman Johnson (Ph.D. 1966) – mathematician, famous for Johnson solids
- Mir Masoom Ali (M. Sc. 1967, Ph.D. 1969) – statistician, Ball State University
- James Stewart (Ph.D. 1967) – mathematician and educator, professor emeritus of mathematics at McMaster University
- Eddy Campbell (Ph.D. 1981) – mathematician, former president of the Canadian Mathematical Society, current president of the University of New Brunswick
- Cem Yıldırım (Ph.D. 1990) – Turkish mathematician who specializes in number theory, professor of mathematics at Boğaziçi University
- Ravi Vakil (B.Sc., M.Sc. 1992) – four-time William Lowell Putnam Scholar, professor of mathematics at Stanford University
- Elizabeth Patton (Ph.D) FRSE – Personal Chair of Melanoma Genetics and Drug Discovery, MRC Human Genetics Unit at Edinburgh
- Jacob Tsimerman (B.Sc. 2006 U.C.) - mathematician, Fields Medal recipient

=== Medicine and dentistry ===
- Anderson Ruffin Abbott (M.D. 1861) – first Black Canadian doctor, participated in the American Civil War
- Margaret Allemang (B.S. 1940) – recipient of the Queen Elizabeth II Golden Jubilee Medal in 2002
- Albert Ernest Archer (M.D.) – physician and political activist, president of the Canadian Medical Association, 1942–43
- Elizabeth Bagshaw (M.B.) – medical director of the first birth control clinic in Canada
- Michael Baker (M.D. 1966) – physician and cancer researcher, Physician-in-Chief of the Toronto General Hospital, recipient of the Queen Elizabeth II Golden Jubilee Medal
- Donald Balfour (M.B. 1906, M.D. 1914) – surgeon and co-founder of the Mayo Clinic
- Ernest Black Struthers (B.A. 1910, M.B. 1912) – physician, professor, and medical missionary, noted for his research on kala- azar and missionary work for the London Missionary Society, Cheeloo University, and Severance Union Medical College
- Frederick Banting (M.B. 1916) – co-discoverer of insulin, with student Charles Best, co-researcher James Collip and professor of physiology John Macleod
- Frieda Fraser (B.A. 1922, M.B. 1925) – researcher in infectious diseases and Professor of Microbiology at the University of Toronto
- Henry J. M. Barnett (M.D. 1944) – pioneer of the use of aspirin as a preventive therapy for heart attack and stroke
- Staff Barootes (M.D. 1943) – physician and urologist, former treasurer and deputy president of the Canadian Medical Association
- John Basmajian (M.D. 1945) – physician, noted for his work in rehabilitation science, taught at Queen's University at Kingston, Emory University and McMaster University
- Sheela Basrur (M.D. 1982) – Chief Medical Officer of Health and Assistant Deputy Minister of Public Health in the Ontario Ministry of Health and Long-Term Care, 2004–06
- Gordon Bell (M.D. 1943) – drug and alcohol addiction researcher and founder of Donwood Institute and Bellwood Health Services
- Charles Best (B.A. 1921, M.D. 1925) – student of Frederick Banting in the discovery of insulin; later adviser to the medical research committee of the World Health Organization
- Norman Bethune (M.D. 1916) – physician and humanitarian; developed the first blood transfusion service in the Spanish Civil War, doctor to Mao Zedong's army in the Second Sino-Japanese War
- Wilfred Gordon Bigelow (M.D. 1938) – heart surgeon who developed the artificial pacemaker and the use of hypothermia in open heart surgery
- Francis John Blatherwick (D.PH. 1975) – one of Canada's trailblazing leaders in public health, the longest-serving medical health officer in Canada
- Susan Bradley (M.D. 1966) – psychiatrist best known for her work in gender identity disorder in children, former Psychiatrist-in-Chief at the Hospital for Sick Children
- John Callaghan (M.D. 1946) – cardiac surgeon who "pioneered open-heart surgery in Alberta"
- Kevin Chan (B.Sc.) – emergency physician at the Hospital for Sick Children, expert in pediatric population health
- Christopher Chetsanga (M.Sc. 1965, Ph.D. 1969) – professor of the University of Zimbabwe who discovered two DNA repair enzymes
- Brock Chisholm (M.D. 1924) – director-general of the World Health Organization, 1948–53
- Charles Kirk Clarke (M.D. 1879) – psychiatrist who co-founded the Canadian National Committee for Mental Hygiene (now the Canadian Mental Health Association)
- James Collip (B.A. 1912 Trin., M.A. 1913, Ph.D. 1916) – significant member of the research team that discovered insulin; later served as the chair of the Department of Biochemistry at McGill University and dean of Medicine at the University of Western Ontario
- Harold Copp (M.D. 1939) – biochemist who discovered and named calcitonin, a hormone used in the treatment of hypercalcemia and osteoporosis
- Thomas Stephen Cullen (M.B. 1890) – gynecologist associated with Johns Hopkins Hospital; Cullen's sign is named for him
- Robert Defries (M.D. 1913) – physician; former director of Connaught Medical Research Laboratories
- Theodore Drake (M.B. 1914) – pediatrician and nutrition expert
- Vera Etches (M.H.Sc.) – physician and Ottawa's medical officer of health
- Christine Friedenreich – cancer epidemiologist
- Jessie Gray (B.Sc. 1931, M.D. 1934, Ch.M. 1939) – surgeon, lecturer, and researcher
- Larry Goldenberg (M.D. 1978) – pioneer in the role of MRI and focal therapy in the treatment of prostate cancer
- Brian Goldman (M.D. 1980) – doctor and radio personality; practices at Mount Sinai Hospital; produces a radio documentary series, White Coat, Black Art
- Duncan Archibald Graham (M.B. 1905) – physician and academic, Physician-in-Chief at the Toronto General Hospital until 1947
- Arthur Ham (M.B. 1927) – prominent histologist, fellow of the Royal Society of Canada, textbook Histology
- Raymond Heimbecker (M.D. 1947) – cardiovascular surgeon who performed the world's first complete heart valve transplant in 1962 and Canada's first modern heart transplant in 1981
- Jack Hirsh (D.Sc.) – clinician, and scientist specializing in anticoagulant therapy and thrombosis, fellow of the Royal Society of Canada
- Sophie Jamal (M.D. 1991, Ph.D. 2002) – clinician-scientist who incited one of Canada's largest scientific misconduct cases
- Harold E. Johns (M.A., Ph.D. 1939) – medical physicist who developed of the use of ionizing radiation to treat cancer
- Victor Ling (B.Sc. 1966) – medical researcher known for the discovery of P-glycoprotein
- John Joseph Mackenzie (B.Sc. 1886 U.C., professor of pathology and bacteriology) – pathologist and bacteriologist, member of the Society of American Bacteriologists and the American Association of Pathologists and Bacteriologists
- William Edward Macklin – medical missionary, hospital founder and public health advocate in China
- Florence McConney (B.A., 1917, M.D., 1920) – physician and chief of Medicine at Women's College Hospital
- Thomas McCrae (M.D. 1903) – Professor of Medicine at Jefferson Medical College, collaborated with William Osler on The Principles and Practice of Medicine
- Ernest McCulloch (M.D. 1948) – cellular biologist and Lasker Award recipient credited with the discovery of the stem cell
- Robert McMurtry (M.D. 1965) – physician, special advisor to the Canadian Royal Commission on the Future of Health Care
- Maud Menten (B.A. 1904, M.B. 1907, M.D. 1911) – major contributor to enzyme kinetics and histochemistry, for whom the Michaelis–Menten equation is named
- Kelly Metcalfe (Ph.D. 2002) – cancer researcher, professor at the University of Toronto and at Women's College Hospital
- Thomas Mills (B.A. 1871 U.C., M.A. 1872) – physician and physiologist, taught at McGill University, fellow of the Royal Society of Canada
- Ken Money (B.Sc. 1958, M.Sc. 1959, Ph.D. 1961) – astronaut and physiologist, retired from Defence and Civil Institute of Environmental Medicine now known as Defence Research and Development Canada
- James Fraser Mustard (M.D. 1953) – physician and scientist, a founding member of the McMaster University's Faculty of Medicine, past chairman of Ballard Power Systems
- William Thornton Mustard (M.D. 1937) – physician and cardiac surgeon, one of the first to perform open-heart surgery, well known for Mustard cardiovascular procedure
- Jack Newman (M.D. 1970) – physician specializing in breastfeeding support and advocacy, consultant for Unicef's Baby Friendly Hospital Initiative
- Robert Noble (M.D. 1934) – physician who was involved in the discovery of vinblastine, recipient of the Gairdner Foundation International Award
- Jayadeep Patra, Alcohol addiction researcher and professor at the Dalla Lana School of Public Health
- James Orbinski (M.A. 1998, associate professor of medicine) – president of Médecins Sans Frontières; fellow at the Munk Centre for International Studies
- Oronhyatekha (M.D. 1866) – first Canadian Aboriginal medical graduate, former president of the Grand Council of Canadian Chiefs
- Nancy Olivieri (B.Sc.) – prominent Toronto haematologist and researcher with an interest in the treatment of haemoglobinopathies.
- Jennie Smillie Robertson (M.B. 1909) – first female surgeon in Canada
- Robert B. Salter (M.D. 1947) – pediatric orthopaedic surgeon who originated the continuous passive motion (CPM) treatment to aid the recovery of joints after trauma
- Ricky Kanee Schachter (M.B. 1943, associate professor) – dermatologist, former president of the Canadian Dermatological Association
- Peter A. Singer (M.D. 1984) – former director of the University of Toronto Joint Centre for Bioethics and member of the scientific advisory board of the Bill & Melinda Gates Foundation
- Elizabeth Stern (M.D. 1939) – professor of epidemiology at the University of California, Los Angeles who published the first case report linking a virus to a cancer
- Augusta Stowe-Gullen (M.D. 1883) – first female Canadian doctor, awarded the Order of British Empire
- James Thorburn (M.B.) – physician and university professor, consulting surgeon at the Toronto General Hospital, president of the Canadian Medical Association, 1895
- Stephen Ticktin (M.D. 1973) – psychiatrist, therapist and lecturer, notable figure in the anti-psychiatry movement
- Ross Upshur (M.Sc. 1997) – physician and researcher, director of the Primary Care Research Unit at Sunnybrook Research Institute
- Paul Walfish (M.D. 1958) – endocrinologist, noted for his research in thyroid physiology and pathology, worked at Mount Sinai Hospital
- Daniel J. Drucker (M.D. 1980) – discovered and characterized the GLP-1 molecule; winner of Canada Gairdner International Award
- Derrick Rossi (B.Sc.) – founder of the biotechnology company Moderna
- Donald Redelmeier (B.Sc. 1980, M.D. 1984) – internist, Professor of Medicine at University of Toronto and expert in decision science

=== Physics, chemistry and astronomy ===
- William Frederick King (B.A. 1874) – astronomer, founding director of the Dominion Observatory, president of the Royal Society of Canada, 1911–12
- Robert Fulford Ruttan (B.A. 1881) – chemist and educator, former president of the Royal Society of Canada and the Royal Canadian Golf Association
- Clarence Chant (B.A. 1890) – physicist and astronomer, president of the Royal Astronomical Society of Canada and principal founder of the David Dunlap Observatory, considered the father of Canadian astronomy
- John Cunningham McLennan (B.Sc. 1892, Ph.D. 1900) – physicist of the Cavendish Laboratory and McLennan Laboratories, key founder of the National Research Council
- John Stanley Plaskett (B.Sc. 1899) – astronomer who discovered the binary nature of Plaskett's star
- Eli Franklin Burton (B.Sc. 1901, Ph.D. 1910) – Fellow of the Royal Society of Canada and member of the National Research Council, co-developer of the first practical electron microscope
- William Edmund Harper (B.Sc. 1906, M.Sc. 1907) – astronomer, fellow of the Royal Astronomical Society of Canada, member of staff at the Dominion Observatory
- Lawrence V. Redman (B.A. 1908) – chemist, pioneer in the industrial applications of plastics, former president of the American Chemical Society
- Arthur Jeffrey Dempster (B.Sc. 1909, M.Sc. 1910) – physicist who developed the world's first modern mass spectrometer and discovered uranium isotope ^{235}U
- Joseph Algernon Pearce (B.Sc., M.Sc.) – astrophysicist, director of the Dominion Astrophysical Observatory, 1940–51, former president of the Royal Astronomical Society of Canada and the Royal Society of Canada
- Harry Hemley Plaskett (B.A. 1916) – astronomer who made significant contributions to the fields of solar physics, astronomical spectroscopy and spectrophotometry, taught at Oxford and won the Gold Medal of the Royal Astronomical Society
- Frank Scott Hogg (B.Sc.) – astronomer who pioneered in the study of spectrophotometry of stars and of spectra of comets; the crater Hogg on the Moon is co-named for him
- Don Misener (M.Sc. 1935) – discoverer of the superfluid phase of matter together with Pyotr Leonidovich Kapitsa
- Donald MacRae (B.Sc. 1937) – astronomer, director of the David Dunlap Observatory, 1965–78, appeared in the Academy Award-nominated NFB documentary Universe
- Patterson Hume (B.A. 1945) – computer scientist and physicist, professor, former host of The Nature of Things with Donald Ivey, Master of Massey College (1981–1988)
- Arthur Leonard Schawlow (B.A. 1941 Vic., M.A., Ph.D. 1949) – developer of laser spectroscopy
- Walter Kohn (B.A. 1945 U.C., M.A. 1946) – pioneer of quantum chemistry and leading developer of the density functional theory
- Boris P. Stoicheff (B.Sc. 1947, Ph.D. 1950, professor of physics) – physicist, former president of the Optical Society of America, recipient of the Frederic Ives Medal
- Bertram Brockhouse (M.A. 1948, Ph.D. 1950) – developer of neutron triple-axis spectrometry and other neutron scattering techniques for studies of condensed matter
- Robert Ackman (B.A. 1950) – chemist and pioneer in marine oils and Omega-3 fatty acid
- Ursula Franklin (post-doctoral studies) – metallurgist, research physicist, humanitarian, first female professor in the University of Toronto's department of metallurgy and materials science, fellow of the Royal Society of Canada
- Isaac Abella (B.A. 1957) – physicist specializing in laser physics, quantum optics and spectroscopy, professor of physics at the University of Chicago
- Thomas Timusk (B.A. 1957) – physicist, professor emeritus of physics at McMaster University, co-winner of the Frank Isakson Prize for Optical Effects in Solids
- Robert J. LeRoy (B.Sc. 1965, M.Sc. 1967) – developer of the near-dissociation theory and the LeRoy Radius with Richard Barry Bernstein
- Hugh Ross (M.Sc., Ph.D.) – astronomer, astrophysicist, Old Earth creationist and Christian apologist; established his own ministry called Reasons To Believe
- Elagu V. Elaguppillai (M.Sc. 1968, Ph.D. 1970) – nuclear scientist, former Senior Scientific Advisor of Canadian Nuclear Safety Commission, member of the United Nations Scientific Committee on the Effects of Atomic Radiation, 1992–96
- Wladyslaw Metanomski
- William Richard Peltier (M.Sc. 1969, Ph.D. 1971) – physicist in atmospheric, oceanic and geophysical turbulence and fluid dynamics, fellow of the Royal Society of Canada and the American Geophysical Union
- Mark B. Wise (B.Sc. 1976, M.Sc. 1977) – theoretical physicist known for his role in the development of heavy quark effective theory, John A. McCone Professor of High Energy Physics at California Institute of Technology
- Melissa Franklin (B.Sc. 1977 Innis) – experimental particle physicist, professor of physics at Harvard University
- Walter Dorn (Ph.D. 1985) – chemist and educator, chair of the Canadian Pugwash Group, the Canadian branch of the Pugwash Conferences on Science and World Affairs which received the 1995 Nobel Peace Prize
- David Kirkby (BA 1989) – cosmologist
- Nima Arkani-Hamed (B.Sc. 1993) – theoretical physicist, former professor of physics at Harvard University and faculty of the Institute for Advanced Study
- David Charbonneau (B.Sc.) – Thomas D. Cabot Associate Professor of Astronomy at Harvard University, recipient of the Robert J. Trumpler Award and the Alan T. Waterman Award
- Clara Benson (B.A. 1899, Ph.D. 1903) – chemist, one of the first two women (along with Emma Sophia Baker) to earn a Ph.D. from U of T and one of U of T's first two female associate professors
- Katharine Hayhoe (B.Sc., 1994 – atmospheric scientist and professor at Texas Tech University, climate change communicator, named one of Time magazine's 100 Most Influential people in 2014
- Russell P. Hughes (Ph.D.) – organometallic chemistry researcher and current professor of chemistry at Dartmouth College
- Marie D'Iorio (M.Sc., Ph.D.) – physicist specializing in nanotechnology, past president of the Canadian Association of Physicists, president of Deep Tech Canada
- Paul Wilson (B.App.Sci) – professor of Nuclear Engineering and chair of the Department of Nuclear Engineering and Engineering Physics at the University of Wisconsin–Madison; founding president of the North American Young Generation in Nuclear
- Sara Seager (B.Sc. 1994) – astronomer and planetary scientist and professor at the Massachusetts Institute of Technology

=== Biology and ecology ===
- Archibald Macallum (B.A. 1880) – biochemist and founder of the National Research Council of Canada
- J. Playfair McMurrich (M.A. 1881) – zoologist and academic, winner of the Flavelle Medal, former president of the Royal Society of Canada and the American Association for the Advancement of Science
- Charles E. Saunders (B.A. 1888) – agronomist and inventor of Marquis wheat
- Archibald Gowanlock Huntsman (B.A. 1905, professor of marine zoology 1927–54) – fisheries biologist, invented the fast freezing of fish fillets, recipient of the Flavelle Medal, former president of the Royal Society of Canada
- Michael Grimes (B.A. 1921) – Irish scientist, first professor of Microbiology at University College Cork
- Thelma Finlayson (BS.c., 1932) – entomologist and Simon Fraser University's first professor emerita
- Frances Wagner B.A. (1948, M.A. 1950) – paleontologist, specialized in micropaleontology and was one of the first female scientists permitted to conduct fieldwork by the Geological Survey of Canada
- Marvin Weintraub (Ph.D. 1950) – plant pathologist, head of Canada Department of Agriculture Vancouver Research Station
- C. S. Holling (B.A., M.Sc. 1952) – ecologist and pioneer in ecological economics, director of the International Institute for Applied Systems Analysis in Vienna
- Carolyn Burns (Ph.D. 1966) – Marsden Medal-winning zoologist
- Anne Zeller (M.A. 1971, Ph.D. 1978) – physical anthropologist specialized in the study of primates
- William E. Rees (Ph.D.) – ecologist, professor of ecology at the University of British Columbia, originated the ecological footprint concept and co-developed the method
- Roberta Bondar (Ph.D. UTM, 1974) – astronaut; neurologist; conducts research in basic and clinical science
- Anne Croy (Ph.D. 1974) – reproductive immunologist, fellow of the Royal Society of Canada
- Helen Rodd (M.Sc. 1982, associate professor 1998–) – zoologist, recipient of the Premier's Research Excellence Award
- Cheryl Arrowsmith (Ph.D. 1987) – structural biologist, chief scientist at the Toronto lab of the Structural Genomics Consortium
- Jan Conn (Ph.D. 1987) – geneticist and poet; her book South of the Tudo Bem Cafe was shortlisted for the Pat Lowther Award
- Maydianne Andrade (M.Sc. 1995) – ecologist, professor of ecology at University of Toronto Scarborough
- Heather M. Ferguson (B.Sc.(Hons) 1995) FRSE – Professor of Medical Entomology and Disease Ecology, at Glasgow University; specialist in researching mosquito vectors that spread malaria
- Melanie Woodin (B.Sc. 1995, M.Sc. 1997) – neuroscientist and academic administrator, 17th president of the University of Toronto
- Marc T. J. Johnson (Ph.D. 2007, professor of biology) – Canada Research Chair for Urban Environmental Science, first director of the Centre for Urban Environments
- Jeanny Yao (BSc 2016) – biochemist, technology entrepreneur and environmentalist; jointly identified a bacteria that breaks down phthalates and co-founded Novoloop
- Sanford Jackson (B.Sc., M.Sc., Ph.D) – prominent biochemist, former biochemist-in-chief at the Toronto Hospital for Sick Children, inventor of the bilirubinometer

=== Engineering and computer science ===
- H. E. T. Haultain (B.A.Sc. 1889) – mining engineer who began The Ritual of the Calling of an Engineer; inventor of the Superpanner and Infrasizer, instruments used in dressing ore
- Frederick Walker Baldwin (B.A.Sc. 1906) – hydrofoil and aviation pioneer, designer and builder of the Silver Dart, White Wing and Red Wing aircraft
- D. W. Harvey (B.A.Sc.) – general manager of the Toronto Transit Commission, 1924–38, played a key role in its early development
- John G. Inglis (B.A.Sc. 1923) – general manager of Operations of the Toronto Transit Commission, 1959–68
- Elsie MacGill (B.A.Sc. 1927) – first female aircraft designer, "Queen of the Hurricanes", commissioner on the Royal Commission on the Status of Women of 1967
- Wilbur R. Franks (M.B. 1928) – aviation medical scientist and inventor of the G-suit, awarded the Legion of Merit
- Jim Chamberlin (B.A.Sc. 1936) – aerodynamicist and chief designer of the Avro Arrow, major designer for the Gemini space capsule and Apollo Lunar Module
- James Hillier (B.A. 1937, M.A. 1938, Ph.D. 1941) – scientist and inventor who designed and built the first practical electron microscope with Cecil Hall and Albert Prebus
- Bernard Etkin (B.A.Sc. 1941, M.A.Sc. 1947) – authority on aircraft guidance and control
- Leslie Shemilt (B.A.Sc. 1941) – dean of engineering at McMaster University, 1969–79, fellow of the Royal Society of Canada, recipient of the Canadian Centennial Medal
- Calvin Gotlieb (B.Sc. 1942, M.Sc. 1944, Ph.D. 1947, professor of computer science) – computer scientist who has been called the "father of computing" in Canada, former president of the Canadian Information Processing Society
- James Milton Ham (B.A.Sc. 1943, professor of electrical engineering) – founding fellow and former president of the Canadian Academy of Engineering
- Gerald Bull (B.A.Sc. 1944, M.A.Sc. 1948, Ph.D. 1951) – ballistics engineer and developer of long-range "superguns", headed Project HARP for the United States Department of Defense and later Project Babylon for Saddam Hussein's Iraqi government
- Gordon Slemon (M.A.Sc. 1948, professor of engineering) – electrical engineer, the IEEE Nikola Tesla Award winner, wrote Magnetoelectric Devices and Electric Machines and Drives
- Lewis Urry (B.A.Sc. 1950) – inventor of the alkaline battery and the lithium battery
- William Kahan (B.A. 1954, M.A. 1956, Ph.D. 1958) – architect of the IEEE 754 standard for floating-point computation, developer of the Kahan summation algorithm, recipient of the Turing Award in 1989
- Thomas Brzustowski (B.A.Sc. 1958) – former president of the Natural Sciences and Engineering Research Council, taught mechanical engineering at the University of Waterloo
- Ken Money (B.Sc. 1958, M.Sc. 1959, Ph.D. 1961, professor of physiology) – retired NRC/CSA astronaut; Spacelab Payload Operations Controller for a Spacelab mission in 1992
- Zvonko Vranesic (B.Eng., M.Eng., Ph.D) – electrical engineer, International Master of chess and developer of computer chess software
- Alfred Aho (B.A.Sc. 1963) – co-creator of the AWK programming language, co-author of Compilers: Principles, Techniques, and Tools and several other textbooks on computer science
- Brian Kernighan (B.A.Sc. 1964) – Bell Labs computer scientist who co-authored The C Programming Language and The UNIX Programming Environment
- Derek Corneil (M.Sc 1965 Ph.D 1968) – chair of Computer Science Department 1985–90 at University of Toronto, professor emeritus of computer science at University of Toronto, author/co-author of over 100 research publications
- Olaf von Ramm (B.Sc. 1968, M.Sc. 1970) – Thomas Lord Professor of Engineering at Duke University and holder of the first patent on three-dimensional ultrasound
- Keith Geddes (M.Sc. 1970, Ph.D. 1973) – professor emeritus in the David R. Cheriton School of Computer Science at the University of Waterloo, member of the Association for Computing Machinery
- Tom Maibaum (B.A. 1970) – computer scientist concentrating on the theory of specification, taught at Imperial College London, King's College London and McMaster University
- Roberta Bondar (Ph.D. 1974) – first neurologist in space and Canada's first female astronaut; former head of space medicine research at NASA
- Eric Hehner (Ph.D. 1974, professor of computer science) – influential computer scientist who focuses on formal methods, particularly for programming
- Andreas Mandelis (faculty) – expert on photonics
- Jonathan Schaeffer (B.Sc. 1979) – developer of Chinook, the world's strongest checkers-playing computer program, and Polaris, a program that plays Texas hold 'em
- Arthur Whitney (M.A.) – computer scientist most notable for developing the APL-inspired programming languages A+ and K; CEO and co-founder of Kx Systems
- Kim Vicente (B.A.Sc. 1985, professor of engineering 1998–) – mechanical and industrial engineer, specializing in the field of human factors, author of The Human Factor
- Richard Cleve (Ph.D. 1989) – professor of computer science at the David R. Cheriton School of Computer Science at the University of Waterloo, associate member of the Perimeter Institute for Theoretical Physics
- David Megginson – computer software consultant and developer, the lead developer and original maintainer of the Simple API for XML
- Julie Payette (M.A.Sc. 1990) – chief astronaut of the Canadian Space Agency, 2000–07; former research engineer at IBM and Bell-Northern Research
- Gregory Dudek (M.Sc., Ph.D.) – professor of computer science; Director of the McGill University School of Computer Science at McGill University
- Ryan North (M.Sc. 2005) – writer and computer programmer, creator and author of Dinosaur Comics, co-creator of Whispered Apologies and Happy Dog the Happy Dog
- Ilya Sutskever (B.Sc., M.Sc., PhD) – computer scientist; co-inventor of AlexNet and OpenAI; former chief scientist at OpenAI
- Andrej Karpathy (B.Sc.) – computer scientist; former director of artificial intelligence and Autopilot Vision at Tesla; co-founder of OpenAI
- Chris Olah (no degree) – machine learning researcher and a co-founder of Anthropic.

=== Earth science ===
- Joseph Tyrrell (LL.B. 1880) – geologist and mining consultant who discovered dinosaur bones in Alberta's Badlands and coal around Drumheller
- William Parks (B.A. 1892, Ph.D. 1900) – geologist and paleontologist, following in the tradition of Lawrence Lambe, Parksosaurus was named for him
- Elwood S. Moore (B.A. 1904, M.A. 1908) – economic geologist, former president of the Society of Economic Geologists, Royal Society of Canada and Royal Canadian Institute
- C. S. Wright (B.Sc. 1908) – glaciologist and member of the British Antarctic Expedition led by Robert Falcon Scott, navigator of the sledge team that found Scott's perished body
- Duncan R. Derry (M.A. Ph.D.) – economic geologist, creator of the World Atlas of Geological and Mineral Deposits
- George Sherwood Hume (B.Sc.) – geologist, former president of the Geological Association of Canada, the Royal Society of Canada and the Geological Society of America
- John Tuzo Wilson (B.Sc. 1930 Trin.) – geologist, geophysicist and pioneer in the theory of plate tectonics who conceived of the transform fault concept; Officer of the Most Excellent Order of the British Empire, Fellow of the Royal Society, Fellow of the Royal Society of Canada, Fellow of the Royal Society of Edinburgh, Wollaston Medal winner
- Raymond Thorsteinsson (M.Sc.) – award-winning geologist, noted for his contribution to the geology of the Proterozoic and Paleozoic rocks
- Lawrence Morley (B.Sc. 1946, M.Sc., Ph.D.) – geophysicist known for his study of magnetic properties of ocean crust, founder of the Canada Centre for Remote Sensing
- Roger Blais (Ph.D. 1954) – geological engineer who helped develop a number of prospecting and exploration technologies, fellow of the Royal Society of Canada
- Eric W. Mountjoy (Ph.D. 1960) – award-winning geologist, professor emeritus of geology at McGill University, fellow of the Royal Society of Canada
- Harold Williams (Ph.D. 1961) – geologist and expert on the Appalachian Mountains and tectonic development of mountain belts, advanced the theory of colliding super-continents; Fellow of the Royal Society of Canada
- Philip J. Currie (B.Sc. 1972) – paleontologist, museum curator who helped found the Royal Tyrrell Museum of Palaeontology, teaches at the University of Alberta

== Social sciences ==
=== Anthropology, geography and archaeology ===
- Davidson Black (M.A. 1906, M.D. 1909) – paleoanthropologist who identified and named Sinanthropus pekinensis, better known as Peking Man
- Michiko Chiura (d.1982) – pioneer of bioarchaeology in Japan
- Charles Trick Currelly (B.A. 1898 Vic., M.A. 1902) – first director of the Royal Ontario Museum, member of the staff of the Egypt Exploration Fund which was conducting excavations at Abydos in Upper Egypt
- Arthur Custance (M.A., Ph.D.) – anthropologist, scientist and author specializing in science and Christianity
- Elizabeth Bott Spillius (B.A., 1954) – key founder of social network analysis
- Robert Bateman (B.A. 1954 Vic.) – naturalist, painter
- J. Keith Fraser (M.A. 1955) – physical geographer, former president of the Canadian Association of Geographers and the executive secretary, publisher and general manager of the Royal Canadian Geographical Society
- Donald B. Redford (B.A., M.A., Ph.D.) – Egyptologist and archaeologist, editor of The Oxford Encyclopedia of Ancient Egypt, director of the Akhenaten Temple Project
- George F. MacDonald (B.A. 1961) – anthropologist and director of the Canadian Museum of Civilization, 1983–98, member of UNESCO's drafting committee on the protection of world cultural and natural heritage
- Robert John McGhee (B.A. 1964, M.A. 1966) – author and specialist in Arctic archaeology, former president of the Canadian Archaeological Association, fellow of the Royal Society of Canada
- Richard Borshay Lee (B.A., M.A.) – anthropologist studying indigenous people in hunting and gathering societies, best known for his work on the Ju'/hoansi
- Shabir Ally (M.A.) – president of the Islamic Information & Dawah Centre International in Toronto
- Peter J. Brand (Ph.D. 1998) – Egyptologist, field director of the Karnak Great Hypostyle Hall Project of the University of Memphis, 2001–

=== Sociology ===
- Simone Browne (Ph.D. 2007; professor of sociology at University of Texas) – author of Dark Matters: On the Surveillance of Blackness
- Jean Burnet (B.A. Vic.) – sociologist specializing in ethnic studies, founder of the Glendon Sociology Department at York University
- Samuel Delbert Clark (Ph.D. 1938; professor of sociology, 1938–76) – sociologist known for studies on Canadian social development and political economics
- Erving Goffman (B.A. 1945) – sociologist, author of The Presentation of Self in Everyday Life, taught at Cal and UPenn, 73rd president of the American Sociological Association
- Daniel G. Hill (M.A. 1951, Ph.D. 1960) – sociologist, human rights specialist and Black Canadian historian, Ontario Ombudsman, 1984–89, founder of the Ontario Black History Society
- Himani Bannerji (Ph.D.) – writer, academic, professor of sociology at York University, known for her activist work and poetry
- Barry Wellman (Ph.D. 1969) – director of NetLab and retired S.D. Clark Professor of Sociology at the University of Toronto, fellow of Royal Society of Canada
- Elliott Leyton (Ph.D. 1972) – sociologist, educator and author on serial homicide and juvenile delinquency; professor at Memorial University of Newfoundland

=== Psychology and linguistics ===
- Emma Sophia Baker (Ph.D. 1903) – psychologist, one of the first two women (along with Clara Benson) to receive a Ph.D. from U of T
- Elliott Jaques (B.A. 1935) – psychoanalyst and organizational psychologist who developed the notion of requisite organization
- Gurion Hyman (B.Pharm. 1946) – Jewish linguist, anthropologist, pharmacist, composer, artist, and translator, proprietor of the second branch of Hyman's Book and Art Shoppe
- Abram Hoffer (M.D. 1949) – psychiatrist; proposed controversial megavitamin therapies for the treatment of schizophrenia
- Endel Tulving (B.A. 1953 U.C., M.A. 1954, professor emeritus) – neuroscientist whose research developed the distinction between episodic and Semantic memory; famously worked with patient KC; fellow of the Royal Societies of Canada and London
- Albert Bregman (B.A. 1957. M.A. 1959) – psychologist, known for coining the term auditory scene analysis, taught at McGill University, fellow of the Royal Society of Canada
- Arlette Lefebvre (M.D. 1970) – child psychiatrist at the Hospital for Sick Children and founder of Ability Online
- Patricia Alice Shaw (M.A. 1973, Ph.D. 1976) – linguist, noted for her work on First Nations languages, associate professor of linguistics at the University of British Columbia
- Ellen Bialystok (Ph.D. 1976) – psychologist, Distinguished Research Professor of Psychology at York University, fellow of the Royal Society of Canada
- Daniel Schacter (M.A. 1977, Ph.D. 1981, assistant professor of psychology, 1981–87) – psychologist, William R. Kenan, Jr. Professor of Psychology at Harvard University, 2002–, author of The Seven Sins of Memory, Guggenheim Fellow
- Diane Massam (B.A. 1980, professor of linguistics) – linguist specializing in the syntax of Niuean, developed an analysis of noun incorporation
- Lisa Feldman Barrett (B.Sc., 1986) – University Distinguished Professor of Psychology, Northeastern University, and fellow of the Royal Society of Canada, who developed the conceptual-act model of emotion
- Andrew Carnie (B.A. 1991 St.M.) – linguist, professor of linguistics at the University of Arizona, known for his research on syntactic theory
- Rachel Sarah Herz (Ph.D. 1992) – researcher, writer and consultant on the psychology of olfaction
- Katharine Banham (M.A., 1923) – lecturer in psychology and philosophy at the University of Toronto, later Associate Professor of Psychology, Emerita, at Duke University
- Maria Natasha Rajah (Ph. D. 2003) – Professor of Neuroscience at McGill University
- Lee Ross (B.A., 1965) – psychology professor at Stanford University
- Marc Lewis (M.A. 1986, Ph. D. 1989) – psychologist, neuroscientist and author

=== Economics, management and political science ===
- Sedley Cudmore (B.A. 1905, professor of political economy 1908–45) – economist, academic, civil servant, Canada's second Dominion Statistician
- William Thomas Gould Hackett (B.A.Sc.) – economist, economic adviser for the Bank of Montreal
- John Kenneth Galbraith (B.Sc. 1931 OAC) – economist, former professor of economics at Harvard, former United States Ambassador to India, former president of the American Economic Association, recipient of two U.S. Presidential Medals of Freedom, The Great Crash, 1929, The Affluent Society, The Age of Uncertainty, The Anatomy of Power
- C. B. Macpherson (B.A. 1933, professor of political economy 1956–87) – political scientist who contributed to the theory of possessive individualism, fellow of the Royal Society of Canada, officer of the Order of Canada, The Life and Times of Liberal Democracy
- Louis Rasminsky (B.A.) – 3rd governor of the Bank of Canada, 1961–73; helped form the postwar international finance system; executive director at the International Monetary Fund and the International Bank for Reconstruction and Development
- John Hodgetts (B.A.) – political scientist; regarded as the "father of public administration studies" in Canada
- David Easton (B.A. 1939) – political scientist; known for his application of systems theory to political science; former president of the American Political Science Association; active member in the American Academy of Arts and Sciences, A Framework for Political Analysis, A Systems Analysis of Political Life
- Lorie Tarshis (B.A.) – economist and educator, professor of economics at Stanford University, 1946–1970
- Harry Gordon Johnson (M.A. 1943) – economist who focused on international trade and international finance, distinguished fellow of the American Economic Association
- John Meisel (B.A., M.A.) – political scientist, 103rd president of the Royal Society of Canada, former chairman of the Canadian Radio-television and Telecommunications Commission
- Martin Shubik (B.A. 1947, M.Sc. 1949) – mathematical economist in game theory, Seymour H. Knox Professor Emeritus of Mathematical Institutional Economics at Yale University
- Richard Lipsey (M.A. 1953) – economist and educator, fellow of the Royal Society of Canada and the Econometric Society, winner of the Schumpeter Prize, wrote Positive Economics, Theory of the Second Best
- Alan Cairns (B.A., 1953, M.A. 1957) – political scientist, professor emeritus of political science at the University of British Columbia, recipient of the Molson Prize
- Gerald Caplan (M.A.) – Canadian academic, public policy analyst, commentator and political activist, former political organizer for the New Democratic Party
- Stephen Clarkson (B.A. Trin., professor of political economy) – political scientist, Senior Fellow at the CIGI, fellow of the Royal Society of Canada
- William Christian (B.A. 1966, M.A.) – professor of political science at the University of Guelph, author of biography on George Grant and Political Parties and Ideologies in Canada
- Malcolm Knight (B.A. 1967, professor of economics 1971–75) – economist, vice-chairman of Deutsche Bank, visiting professor of finance at the London School of Economics, former General Manager of the Bank for International Settlements, former senior deputy governor of the Bank of Canada
- Mel Cappe (B.A. 1971 New) – president and CEO of the Institute for Research on Public Policy, 2006–, Canadian High Commissioner to the United Kingdom, 2002–06
- John Kirton (B.A. 1971) – political scientist specializing in Canadian foreign policy, the director and co-founder of the G8 Research Group, Canadian Foreign Policy in a Changing World
- Douglas A. Ross (B.A., M.A., Ph.D.) – political scientist specializing in international relations, author of In the Interests of Peace: Canada and Vietnam, 1954–1973
- Bernard Yack (B.A.) – American political theorist, The Problems of a Political Animal
- Jeff Rubin (B.A.) – economist and author, former chief economist at CIBC World Markets
- Denise Chong (M.A. 1978) – Chinese Canadian economist and writer, author of Egg on Mao: The Story of an Ordinary Man Who Defaced an Icon and Unmasked a Dictatorship
- Daniel Trefler (B.A. 1982, professor of economics 1997–) – economist specializing in international economics, known for empirical research on patterns of trade
- Maris Martinsons (B.A.Sc. 1982, M.B.A. 1984) – professor of management; government advisor; international business consultant
- Dwayne Benjamin (B.Sc. 1984, professor of economics) – economist, managing editor of Canadian Journal of Economics, editor of Economic Development and Cultural Change
- Andrew Pyle (B.A. 1987, M.A. 1988) – economist, adviser with ScotiaMcLeod, formerly ABN AMRO's chief Canadian strategist
- Stanley E. Zin (Ph.D. 1987) – Cyert and DeGroot Professor of Economics and Statistics at Carnegie Mellon University, research associate at the National Bureau of Economic Research, Frisch Medal recipient
- Shouyong Shi (M.A. 1988, Ph.D. 1991) – economist, tier 1 Canada Research Chair, research fellow at the Bank of Canada
- Janet Currie (B.A. 1982, M.A. 1983) – professor at UCLA, MIT, Columbia University, and Princeton University 2011–present
- Rose Ann Devlin (Ph.D 1988) – professor and vice dean at the University of Ottawa
- Carol Propper (M.A. 1983) – professor at Imperial College London
- Yue Li (M.B.A. 1988, professor of accounting) – associate professor of accounting at the Rotman School of Management and U of T Mississauga
- Philip N. Howard (B.A. 1993) – professor and administrator at University of Oxford
- Yanna Krupnikov (M.A.) – political scientist

== Humanities ==
=== Philosophy ===
- George Blewett (B.A. 1897 Vic.) – first native-born philosopher in English Canada, authored The Study of Nature and The Vision of God
- T. A. Goudge (Ph.D. 1937) – philosopher, member of the American Philosophical Association, president of the Canadian Philosophy Association in 1964, president of the Charles S. Peirce Society 1957 59, wrote The Ascent of Life, which won the Governor General's Award
- Peter Glassen (B.A. 1944, M.A. 1945) – philosopher, noted for his arguments against metaphysical materialism
- James Doull (M.A.) – philosopher and classicist
- Emil Fackenheim (Ph.D. 1945) – Jewish philosopher and Reform rabbi
- Joseph Owens (Ph.D. 1951) – Roman Catholic priest, scholar in medieval philosophy, fellow of the Royal Society of Canada
- James Robb (M.A., Ph.D. 1953) – professor of philosophy at Marquette University, expert in Medieval philosophy
- David Gauthier (B.A. 1954) – philosopher known for his social contract theory of morality, author of Morals by Agreement
- Barry Stroud (B.A.) – Willis S. and Mario Slusser Professor of Philosophy at the University of California at Berkeley
- Ted Honderich (B.A. 1959) – Grote Professor Emeritus of the Philosophy of Mind and Logic at University College London
- Howard Adelman (B.A. 1960, M.A. 1963, Ph.D. 1971) – philosopher, retired professor emeritus of philosophy at York University
- John N. Deck (Ph.D. 1960) – philosopher, known for Nature, Contemplation and the One
- Dan Goldstick (B.A. 1962, professor of philosophy) – long-time member of the Central Committee of the Communist Party of Canada, professor emeritus in philosophy at Toronto
- L. W. Sumner (B.A. 1962) – philosopher in normative and applied ethics and political philosophy, fellow of the Royal Society of Canada
- William Hare (Ph.D. 1971) – philosopher, noted for his work in philosophy of education, Professor Emeritus of Mount Saint Vincent University
- Jennifer Nagel (B.A. 1990, professor of philosophy) – philosopher specializing in epistemology, philosophy of mind, and metacognition, former president of the Central Division of the American Philosophical Association and former president of the Canadian Philosophical Association
- Kaave Lajevardi (Ph.D. 2008) – Iranian philosopher
- Michael Neumann (Ph.D. 1975) – political philosopher, What's Left?, The Rule of Law
- Calvin Normore (Ph.D. 1976) – philosopher, expert in medieval philosophy, past president of the Pacific division of the American Philosophical Association, teaches at UCLA
- Paul Thagard (Ph.D. 1977) – philosopher, former chair of the Governing Board of the Cognitive Science Society, fellow of the Royal Society of Canada
- Jan Zwicky (Ph.D. 1981) – philosopher, poet, essayist, winner of two Governor General's Awards
- Mark Kingwell (B.A. 1985 St. M., professor of philosophy) – philosopher, winner of the Spitz Prize, contributing editor to Harper's Magazine and The Globe and Mail
- John Valk (Ph.D. 1989) – professor of philosophy at University of New Brunswick
- John Russon (Ph.D. 1990) – philosopher, known for his interpretations of G. W. F. Hegel, author of Human Experience and Bearing Witness to Epiphany.
- David Sztybel (Ph.D. 2000) – ethicist specializing in animal ethics
- Robyn Bourgeois (Ph.D 2014) – Cree activist, academic, author, and educator

=== Literature ===
- Wilfred Campbell (B.A. 1882 U.C., M.A. 1883 Wyc.) – poet
- Ralph Connor (B.A. 1883, D.Th. Knox) – novelist
- Archibald Lampman (B.A. 1882 Trin.) – early Canadian poet belonging to the Confederation Poets group
- Stephen Leacock (B.A. 1891 U.C.) – humorist, writer and political economist, Sunshine Sketches of a Little Town
- John McCrae (B.A. 1894, M.B. 1898) – poet, physician and soldier; In Flanders Fields
- E. J. Pratt (B.A. 1911 Vic., M.A. 1912, B.D. 1913) – poet, member of the Royal Society of Canada, three Governor General's Awards, one Lorne Pierce Medal, Towards the Last Spike
- Arthur Bourinot (B.A. 1915 U.C.) – poet, lawyer, won the Governor General's Award for Under the Sun
- Paul Hiebert (M.A.) – writer and humorist, Stephen Leacock Medal for Humour recipient, Sarah Binks
- Raymond Knister (B.A. Vic.) – novelist, short story writer anc critic, My Star Predominant
- Morley Callaghan (B.A. 1925) – novelist, writer and playwright
- Earle Birney (M.A., professor of English, 1936–41) – poet, winner of two Governor General's Awards
- Edna Staebler (B.A. 1929, B.Ed. 1931) – author, best known for a series of cookbooks, awarded the Order of Canada
- Ernest Buckler (M.A. 1930) – novelist and short story writer, awarded the Canadian Centennial Medal, The Mountain and the Valley
- Dorothy Livesay (B.A. 1931 Trin.) – poet, winner of the Governor General's Award for Day and Night and Poems for People
- Northrop Frye (B.A. 1933 Vic.; professor of English 1939–91) – literary critic and theorist; author, Fearful Symmetry, Anatomy of Criticism, The Well-Tempered Critic
- Douglas LePan (B.A. 1935) – poet, novelist and academic, won two Governor General's Awards, one Lorne Pierce Medal, Guggenheim Fellow, The Deserter, The Net and the Sword
- Miriam Waddington (B.A. 1939) – poet, her poem "Jacques Cartier in Toronto" is on the back of the Canadian $100 bill released in 2004
- Margaret Avison (B.A. 1940, M.A. 1965) – poet, Griffin Poetry Prize recipient
- George Elliott (B.A.) – short story writer, reporter and editor of the Timmins Daily Press
- Penn Kemp (M.Ed.) – poet and playwright
- Hugh Kenner (B.A. 1945, M.A. 1946) – literary scholar, critic and professor, taught at UC Santa Barbara, Johns Hopkins and Georgia, Dublin's Joyce, The Poetry of Ezra Pound
- Henry Kreisel (B.A. 1946, M.A. 1947) – writer, officer of the Order of Canada, The Rich Man
- Douglas Lochhead (M.A. 1947) – poet, Carlo Betocchi Poetry Prize recipient, fellow of the Royal Society of Canada
- Phyllis Gotlieb (B.A. 1948, M.A. 1950) – science fiction novelist and poet, winner of the Prix Aurora Award
- Don Coles (B.A. 1949, M.A. 1952) – poet, received the Governor General's Award and the Trillium Book Award
- Walter Stewart (dropped out, 1953) – writer, editor and educator of journalism
- Ken Adachi (B.A., M.A., professor of English 1958–71) – writer and literary critic, The Enemy That Never Was
- Richard Outram (B.A. 1953 Vic.) – poet
- Jay Macpherson (M.A. 1955, Ph.D. 1964, professor of literature, 1957–96) – lyric poet and scholar, winner of the Governor General's Award, The boatman
- Rod Anderson (B.Sc. 1956) – poet, musician and chartered accountant, member of the Canadian League of Poets
- Eli Mandel (Ph.D. 1957) – poet and literary academic, winner of the Governor General's Award, An Idiot Joy
- Scott Symons (B.A.) – writer, Place d'Armes
- John Robert Colombo (B.A. 1959) – poet, anthologist, editor, essayist, Mysterious Canada, Richard Maurice Bucke
- Austin Clarke (B.A.) – novelist, essayist and short story writer, Giller Prize and Commonwealth Writers Prize winner, The Polished Hoe
- Claire Pratt (B.A. Vic.) – poet, artist, editor, senior editor of McClelland & Stewart
- Barry Callaghan (B.A. 1960 St.M., M.A. 1962) – author, poet, son of Morley Callaghan
- David Helwig (B.A. 1960) – poet, novelist and essayist, professor of literature at Queen's University at Kingston, member of the Order of Canada
- Dave Godfrey (B.A. Trin.) – writer and publisher, won the Governor General's Award for his novel The New Ancestors
- Sheila Watson (Ph.D. 1961 St.M.) – novelist, critic and educator, the Lorne Pierce Medal recipient, The Double Hook
- Margaret Atwood (B.A. 1961 Vic.) – writer, poet and novelist; The Handmaid's Tale, The Blind Assassin; recipient of one Prince of Asturias Award, one Arthur C. Clarke Award, five Booker Prizes and two Governor General's Awards
- Dennis Lee (B.A. 1962, M.A. 1965) – children's writer and poet, Alligator Pie
- Eric Wright (M.A. 1963) – novelist
- Maureen Jennings (MA 1963) – novelist
- Matt Cohen (B.A. 1964, M.A. 1965) – writer, recipient of the Governor General's Award, Elizabeth and After, Emotional Arithmetic
- Michael Ondaatje (B.A. 1965 U.C.) – poet and novelist, The English Patient; recipient of the Booker Prize
- Joy Fielding (B.A. 1966) – novelist and actress, Kiss Mommy Goodbye, See Jane Run
- Norma Cole (M.A.) – contemporary American poet, visual artist and frequent translator, Mace Hill Remap, Do the Monkey
- David Staines (B.A. 1967) – literary critic and university professor, taught at several institutions including Harvard,
- Nigel Spencer (M.A. 1967) – Governor General's Awards for Literary Translation: 2002, 2007, 2012
- Lorne Pierce Medal recipient, fellow of the Royal Society of Canada
- Margaret Visser (Ph.D.) – writer, broadcaster, Glenfiddich Award and Jane Grigson Award recipient, The Geometry of Love: Space, Time, Mystery and Meaning in an Ordinary Church
- Edmundo Farolan (M.A. 1969) – writer
- Linda Hutcheon (B.A. 1969, Ph.D. 1975; professor of literature, 1988–) – former president of the Modern Language Association
- Susan Wood (B.A. 1969, M.A. 1970, Ph.D. 1975) – author and critic, recipient of three Hugo Awards for Best Fan Writer, co-publisher of Energumen
- Elizabeth Brewster (B.LSc.) – poet and academic, member of the Order of Canada
- Greg Hollingshead (B.A.) – novelist, winner of the Governor General's Award for his short fiction The Roaring Girl
- John Steffler (B.A. 1971) – poet and novelist, recipient of the Thomas Head Raddall Award and the Atlantic Poetry Prize, former Canadian Parliamentary Poet Laureate
- Wayne Tefs (M.A.) – novelist, critic and anthologist, recipient of the Canadian Magazine Fiction Prize for Red Rock and After
- M. T. Kelly (M.A.) – novelist, poet and playwright, the Governor General's Award recipient, A Dream Like Mine
- Anne Carson (B.A. 1974 St.M., M.A. 1975, Ph.D. 1981) – poet, essayist and translator; professor of classics at the University of Michigan
- Derrick de Kerckhove (Ph.D. 1975, professor of French) – theorist on Western civilization, literacy and society; former Director, Marshall McLuhan Program; The Skin of Culture
- Dionne Brand (B.A. UTM, M.A., Ph.D) – poet, novelist, fellow of the Royal Society of Canada, Poet Laureate of Toronto for a three-year term
- Guy Gavriel Kay (LL.B. 1976) – author of fantasy fiction, The Fionavar Tapestry
- O.R. Melling (B.A. Trin 1977, M.A. SGS 1984) – writer, screenwriter and literary critic
- Di Brandt (M.A.) – poet and literary critic, recipient of the Gerald Lampert Award, juror of the 2008 Governor General's Awards
- Paul Quarrington (B.A.) – novelist and playwright, winner of Stephen Leacock Award, Governor General's Award and Matt Cohen Prize, King Leary, Whale Music, and The Spirit Cabinet
- John Mighton (B.A. 1978 Vic., Ph.D. 2000) – author and mathematician, winner of two Governor General's Awards, Possible Worlds
- Guy Gavriel Kay (LL.B. 1978) – author of fantasy fiction, winner of Prix Aurora Award, The Wandering Fire, Tigana, The Last Light of the Sun
- Susan Glickman (Ph.D., professor of English, −1993) – writer and critic, recipient of the Gabrielle Roy Prize
- Anne Michaels (B.A. 1980) – poet and novelist; Commonwealth Prize, Orange Prize recipient
- B. W. Powe (M.A. 1981) – author, poet, essayist
- Marianne Ackerman (M.A. 1981) – playwright, novelist, journalist, theatre critic for Montreal Gazette, Nathan Cohen Award winner
- Charles Foran (B.A. St.M.) – novelist and non-fiction writer, contribution editor to The Walrus, contributing reviewer for The Globe and Mail
- Rohinton Mistry (B.A. 1982) – author, Governor General's Award, Commonwealth Writers Prize and Giller Prize recipient, Such a Long Journey and A Fine Balance
- David Manicom (B.A.) – poet, novelist and diplomat, a finalist for the 2004 Governor General's Award for English language poetry
- Barbara Fradkin (M.A.) – mystery writer, two-time winner of the Arthur Ellis Award for Best Novel, past president of Crime Writers of Canada
- Michael Redhill (B.A.) – poet, playwright, novelist, publisher and editor of Brick
- Kenneth Oppel (B.A. Trin.) – author, the Governor General's Literary Award recipient, Silverwing, Airborn, Skybreaker
- Camilla Gibb (B.A. 1991 U.C.) – author, Mouthing the Words and Sweetness in the Belly
- Elizabeth Ruth (B.A., M.A.) – novelist, Ten Good Seconds of Silence
- Bert Archer (B.A. St.M.) – author, journalist, and critic, former editor of Toronto Star, The Globe and Mail, columnist of Toronto Life
- Andrew Pyper (LL.B.) – writer of fiction, winner of the Arthur Ellis Award for Lost Girls
- Nicole Lundrigan (B.A. 1996) – novelist
- Hal Niedzviecki (B.A.) – novelist and cultural critic, co-founder of the magazine Broken Pencil
- Lynn Crosbie (Ph.D., professor of literature) – poet and novelist, columnist for The Globe and Mail
- Vincent Lam (M.D. 1999) – writer and medical doctor, recipient of the Giller Prize, Bloodletting and Miraculous Cures
- Sky Gilbert (M.A. 2000) – writer, actor, academic and drag performer, appeared in Too Much Sex
- Sheila Heti (B.A.) – writer, Ticknor, The Middle Stories
- Rebecca Rosenblum (M.A. 2007) – author, Journey Prize finalist
- Harold Sonny Ladoo (B.A. 1973 UTM) – novelist, author of No Pain Like This Body (1972)
- Tea Mutonji (BA 2018 UTSC) – writer and poet, winner of the Ontario Creates Trillium Book Award

=== History ===
- John George Bourinot (dropped out) – historian and civil servant, founding member of the Royal Society of Canada, creator of the Bourinot's Rules of Order
- Celia Chazelle (B.A. 1976 Trinity) – historian
- James T. Shotwell (B.A. 1898) – history professor at Columbia University, president of the Carnegie Endowment for International Peace, member of the San Francisco Conference that drafted the United Nations Charter
- Arthur R. M. Lower (B.A.) – historian, recipient of two Governor General's Awards, former president of the Royal Society of Canada
- Frank Underhill (M.A., professor of history) – historian, social critic and political thinker, a founder of the Co-operative Commonwealth Federation, In Search of Canadian Liberalism
- W. G. Hardy (B.A. 1917, M.A. 1920) – Professor of Classics of University of Alberta, writer, ice hockey administrator, Member of the Order of Canada
- C. P. Stacey (B.A. 1924) – official historian of the Canadian Army in the Second World War; contributor to the study of the Dieppe Raid and Operation Spring
- Donald Creighton (B.A. 1925 Vic.; professor of history, 1945–79) – historian, novelist and noted anglophile, author of Commercial Empire of the St. Lawrence
- Michael Bliss (B.A., M.A., Ph.D., professor) – medical, business and political historian, author of The Discovery of Insulin, William Osler: A Life in Medicine and Harvey Cushing: A Life in Surgery
- Victor Lange (M.A. 1931 U.C.) – renowned Germanist; president of the International Society of Germanists, John M. Woodhull Professor of Modern Languages at Princeton University
- John Wendell Holmes (M.A. 1933) – historian and diplomat, former president of the Canadian Institute of International Affairs, recipient of the J. B. Tyrrell Historical Medal
- Alfred Bailey (Ph.D. 1934) – ethno-historian and educator, former assistant director and associate curator of the New Brunswick Museum, fellow of the Royal Society of Canada
- J. M. S. Careless (B.A. 1940) – historian and biographer, two-time winner of the Governor General's Award
- William Kilbourn (B.A. Trin. 1948) – historian, member of the executives of the Canada Council and the Canadian commission for UNESCO, fellow of the Royal Society of Canada
- Stephen Clarkson (B.A. 1959 Trin.) – political scientist specializing in foreign policy, neoconservatism, globalization and North American integration; Governor General's Award winner
- Jack Granatstein (M.A. 1962) – historian, winner of the J.B. Tyrrell Historical Medal, Vimy Award
- Irving Abella (B.A. 1963, M.A. 1964, Ph.D. 1969) – historian, writer, None is Too Many: Canada and the Jews of Europe 1933-1948, fellow of the Royal Society of Canada
- Michiel Horn (M.A., Ph.D.) – historian and educator, fellow of the Royal Society of Canada, professor emeritus, Glendon College, York University
- Modris Eksteins (B.A. Trin., professor of history 1970–) – historian, winner of the Trillium Book Award and the Pearson Writers' Trust Non-Fiction Prize, Rites of Spring: The Great War, The Birth of Modern Age
- Robert Bothwell (B.A., professor of Canadian history 1981–) – historian, best known for his work on Canadian Cold War participation
- Norman Hillmer (B.A. 1966, M.A. 1967) – historian and educator, For Better or For Worse: Canada and the United States to the 1990s
- David Bercuson (M.A. 1967, Ph.D. 1971) – labour, military and political historian, Vimy Award winner, fellow of the Royal Society of Canada, Deconfederation: Canada without Quebec
- Margaret Conrad (M.A. 1968, Ph.D. 1979) – historian specializing in Atlantic Canada and Women's history, recipient of the Queen's Golden Jubilee Medal, fellow of the Royal Society of Canada
- Veronica Strong-Boag (B.A. 1970, Ph.D. 1975) – historian, former president of the Canadian Historical Association, fellow of the Royal Society of Canada
- George R. D. Goulet (LL.M.) – Métis best-selling author and retired lawyer
- Alastair Sweeny (B.A. Trin.) – historian, author and publisher, wrote George-Étienne Cartier: A Biography
- Roger Sarty (B.A.) – historian specializing in the history of Canada's navy and coastal defence
- Nick Brune (B.A. 1975, M.A. 1976, B.Ed. 1977) – educator, historian and author, winner of the Governor General's Award for Excellence in Teaching Canadian History
- Kenneth R. Bartlett (Ph.D. 1978, professor of history) – Renaissance historian, president of the Canadian Society for Renaissance Studies
- Afua Cooper (Ph.D.) – historian and dub poet, Memories Have Tongue, The Hanging of Angelique
- Carolyn Muessig (M.A., 1986 Centre for Medieval Studies) – medievalist specializing in sermon literature, female education, and hagiography; chair of Christian Thought, Department of Classics and Religion, University of Calgary
- Ruth Elizabeth Spence (B.A. 1913) – author, Prohibition in Canada: A Memorial to Francis Stephens Spence

== Law (excluding the Supreme Court judges mentioned above) ==
- Irus Braverman (S.J.D. 2009) – legal scholar and professor of law and an adjunct professor of geography at the University at Buffalo
- John Arnup (B.A. 1932 Vic.) – judge of the Court of Appeal for Ontario, 1970–85, best known for having pioneered universal legal aid in Ontario
- Anne Bayefsky (B.A., M.A., LL.B.) – human rights scholar and activist, senior fellow at the Hudson Institute, teaches at York University
- Charles Dubin (B.A. 1941) – chief justice of Ontario, 1990–96, best known for leading the Dubin Inquiry into the use of steroids by athletes
- Todd Ducharme (LL.B. 1986) – first Métis to be appointed to the Ontario Superior Court of Justice
- William Glenholme Falconbridge (B.A. 1866 U.C., M.A. 1870) – Chief Justice of Ontario Superior Court of Justice, 1900–20
- Colleen M. Flood (MA, PhD) – professor in the Faculty of Law at the University of Ottawa
- Martin Friedland (B.Comm. 1955, LL.B. 1958) – lawyer, academic and author; recipient of the Molson Prize in 1994
- George Alexander Gale (B.A. 1929) – chief justice of Ontario, 1964–76
- Bill Hastings (B.A. 1978) – District Court judge of New Zealand
- Bernard Hibbitts (LL.M. 1986) – lawyer, professor and publisher, founder and publisher of JURIST, teaches at the University of Pittsburgh School of Law
- Samuel Hughes QC (B.A. 1934) – judge of the Supreme Court of Ontario and chairman of the Hughes Inquiry
- William Goldwin Carrington Howland (B.A. 1936) – chief justice of Ontario, 1977–92
- William Kaplan (B.A. 1980) – lawyer and writer, professor of law at the University of Ottawa Law School, 1989–2001
- Marcia V. J. Kran (M.A. 1989) – International human rights lawyer
- Mayo Moran (S.J.D. 1999, dean of the faculty of law, 2006–) – law professor who published extensively in comparative constitutional law, private law, and legal and feminist theory
- Ed Morgan (LL.B. 1984) – professor of International Law at the University of Toronto
- Stephen R. Perry – John J. O'Brien Professor of Law and Professor of Philosophy at the University of Pennsylvania Law School
- Kent Roach (B.A. 1984 Vic., LL.B. 1987, professor of law) – legal academic noted for his writings on criminal law, former law clerk to Justice Bertha Wilson of the Supreme Court
- Clayton Ruby (LL.B. 1969) – lawyer, specializing in constitutional and criminal law and civil rights, former acting Treasurer of the Law Society of Upper Canada
- Robert Sharpe (LL.B. 1970, dean of the faculty of law, 1990–95) – Judge of the Court of Appeal for Ontario, 1999–; patron of the Oxford University Commonwealth Law Journal
- James Marshall Tory (B.A.) – chair emeritus and counsel at Torys LLP
- John A. Tory (B.A., LL.B. 1952) – co-founder of the law firm, Tory, Tory, Deslauriers, a director of Rogers Communications
- John S. D. Tory – founder of Torys LLP, a director of A.V. Roe Canada
- Stephen Waddams (B.A., professor of law) – legal academic specializing in contract law, former Visiting Fellow at All Souls College, Oxford, fellow of the Royal Society of Canada
- Gordon F. Henderson (B.A. 1934) – lawyer, president of the Canadian Bar Association, chancellor of the University of Ottawa
- Camille A Nelson (BA 1991 UTSC) – professor of Law and Dean at the University of Hawaii's William S. Richardson School of Law, specializing in comparative law and critical race theory
- Janet Yale – Canadian telecommunications lawyer

== Theology ==
- Nathanael Burwash (B.A. 1859 Vic.) – Methodist minister and university administrator
- Albert Benjamin Simpson (B.Th. 1865 Knox) – preacher, theologian and author, founder of the Christian and Missionary Alliance
- Charles Coughlin (B.A. 1911 St.M.) – religious and political speaker, noted radio opponent of Franklin D. Roosevelt
- Stephen Dempster – theologian, author, and professor emeritus of religious studies at Crandall University
- Eugene Fairweather (M.A. philosophy) – theologian
- Robert Baird McClure (M.B. 1922) – 23rd Moderator of the United Church of Canada, 1968–71
- Tom Harpur (B.A. 1951 U.C., D.Th. 1956 Wyc.) – Anglican priest, theologian, author and columnist, former religion editor of the Toronto Star, recipient of a State of Israel Silver Medal for Outstanding Journalism, fellow of the American Religious Public Relations Council
- Amir Hussain (B.A. 1987 U.C., Ph.D. 2001) – editor of the Journal of the American Academy of Religion, past president of the American Academy of Religion
- Andrew Hutchison (L.Th. 1969 Trin.) – primate of the Anglican Church of Canada, 2004–07, bishop of Montreal, 1990–2004
- A. James Reimer (M.A., Ph.D. St.M.) – Mennonite theologian, Mennonites and Classical Theology
- Adele Reinhartz (B.A. 1975, M.A. 1977) – theologian, former president of the Canadian Society of Biblical Studies, fellow of the Royal Society of Canada
- Mary Jo Leddy (Ph.D.) – theologian, writer and social activist, founding editor of the Catholic New Times, former member of the Roman Catholic Sisters of Our Lady of Sion
- Thomas Rosica (D.Th. 1985 Regis) – Catholic priest and Basilian Father, CEO of Canadian Catholic Salt + Light Television network
- Lucian Turcescu (Ph.D. 1999) – theologian, professor of theology at Concordia University
- Grant Jeffrey was a Canadian Bible teacher of Bible prophecy/eschatology and biblical archaeology, proponent of dispensational evangelical Christianity

== Media and arts ==
=== Journalism and publishing ===
- James Ross (B.A. 1857, M.A. 1865) – journalist, lawyer, member of the provisional government established by Louis Riel during the Red River Rebellion of 1869–1870
- Henry Albert Harper (B.A. 1895) – journalist and civil servant; the statue of Sir Galahad at Parliament Hill was built in honour of him
- Peter C. Newman (B.A. 1950 Vic., M.Comm. 1954) – journalist; former editor, Maclean's and Toronto Star; author, The Canadian Establishment, The Secret Mulroney Tapes
- Michele Landsberg (B.A. 1952) – writer, social activist and feminist, columnist for the Toronto Star, recipient of the Governor General's Award
- Walter Stewart (dropped out) – writer, editor and journalism educator, "Canada's conscience"
- Christina McCall (B.A. 1956 Vic.) – journalist and political writer, journalist at The Globe and Mail, Saturday Night and Maclean's, senior editor at Chatelaine
- Barbara Frum (B.A. 1959) – prolific journalist and interviewer for the Canadian Broadcasting Corporation, host of The Journal
- Barbara Amiel (B.A. 1963 U.C.) – British journalist, socialite, spouse of former publisher Conrad Black
- Michael Kesterton (B.A.) – columnist for The Globe and Mail
- John Honderich (B.A.) – publisher of the Toronto Star, 1994–2004
- Margaret Wente (M.A.) – columnist for The Globe and Mail, winner of two National Newspaper Awards for column
- Ellie Tesher (B.A.) – journalist and advice columnist for the Toronto Star
- Marcel Desjardins – journalist, political commentator, news director
- Linda McQuaig (B.A.) – journalist, columnist and non-fiction author, business reporter at The Globe and Mail, columnist for the Toronto Star
- Bonnie Fuller (B.A. 1977 U.C.) – media executive, editorial director of American Media and editor of Flare, Cosmopolitan, YM, Marie Claire, Glamour and Us Weekly
- Heather Mallick (B.A. U.C., M.A.) – columnist for Chatelaine, The Guardian and The Globe and Mail
- John Roberts (B.A. UTM, 1978) – television journalist currently working for the Fox News Channel, as their chief White House correspondent
- John Ibbitson (B.A. 1979) – writer and journalist, columnist for The Globe and Mail
- Lyse Doucet (M.A. 1982) – Chief International correspondent for the "BBC"
- Andrew Coyne (B.A. Trin.) – national editor for Maclean's, former columnist with the National Post
- Matthew Fraser (B.A. 1981 Vic.) – editor-in-chief, National Post
- Jagoda Pike (B.A. Trin.) – publisher of the Toronto Star 2006–08; president of Star Media Group
- Malcolm Gladwell (B.A. 1984 Trin.) – journalist; staff writer for The Washington Post and The New Yorker; author of The Tipping Point, Blink and Outliers
- Isabel Vincent (B.A.) – investigative journalist for the National Post
- Naomi Klein (B.A. incomplete) – journalist and activist; author, No Logo; contributor to The Nation, The Globe and Mail and The Guardian
- Simon Pulsifer (B.A. 2004 Vic.) – prolific contributor to English Wikipedia under the username SimonP
- Ryan North (M.Sc. 2005) – webcomic author
- Sam Forster (M.A. 2019) – cultural critic; journalist at Perfil, UnHerd, and The National Post
- Aaron Badgley – music journalist
- Kirstine Stewart (B.A. 1988 UTM) – media executive and author

=== Film, television, radio, and theatre ===
- Preet Banerjee (B.S. 2001 UTSC) – host of the television show Million Dollar Neighbourhood on the Oprah Winfrey Network
- Mary Berg – television personality, chef, and winner of MasterChef Canada season 3
- Leah Cherniak (B.A. 1979) – playwright, theatre director, and professor
- Enrico Colantoni – actor and director
- David Cronenberg (B.A. 1967 U.C.) – film director, Videodrome, The Fly, A History of Violence
- Sabrina Cruz – Canadian YouTuber
- William B. Davis (B.A. 1959) – actor, known for his role as the Cigarette Smoking Man on The X-Files
- Jeff Deverett – film producer, Full Out, Kiss and Cry, The Samuel Project
- Atom Egoyan (B.A. 1982 Trin.) – film director, The Sweet Hereafter, Where the Truth Lies
- Victor Garber – actor
- Shelley Gillen – television writer and producer, Murdoch Mysteries, The Listener, Fido
- Henry Gladstone – radio newscaster and actor
- Peter Gzowski (dropped out) – broadcaster, writer and reporter, the CBC Radio show Morningside
- Allie Goodbun (B.S.) – dancer, showgirl, and actress known for performing at the Moulin Rouge and for her role as Cassie in The Next Step
- Marilyn Hall (c. 1927–2017) – Canadian-born American producer and philanthropist
- Hart Hanson (B.A.) – American television writer and producer, Bones, Joan of Arcadia
- Elizabeth Sterling Haynes (B.A. V.C.) – theatre activist and educator
- Arthur Hiller (B.A. 1947 U.C., M.A. 1950) – film director, The Man in the Glass Booth, Silver Streak
- Heather Hiscox (B.A. 1986) – news anchor who works for the Canadian Broadcasting Corporation, host of CBC News: Morning
- William Hutt (B.A. 1948 Trin.) – actor of stage, television and film, King Lear, Long Day's Journey into Night, Sam Wanamaker Prize recipient
- Norman Jewison (B.A. 1949 Vic.) – film director, In the Heat of the Night, Fiddler on the Roof, Moonstruck
- Albert Wesley Johnson (M.PA.) – president of the Canadian Broadcasting Corporation, 1975–1982
- Aida Jordão (MA, PhD) – playwright and theatre director
- Ted Kotcheff (B.A. 1952) – film and television director, First Blood, Law & Order: Special Victims Unit
- Lin Chi-ling (B.A.) – Taiwanese actress and model, Red Cliff
- Tim Long (B.A. 1992 U.C.) – comedy screenwriter, The Simpsons, Politically Incorrect, Spy Magazine, Late Show with David Letterman
- Leon Major (B.A. 1955) – opera and theatre director, artistic director of Boston Lyric Opera, 1998–2003
- Ron Mann (B.A. 1980 Innis) – documentary filmmaker, Imagine the Sound, Grass
- Daniel McCarthy (B.A. St. Michael's) – children's television producer who helped create The Friendly Giant, Mr. Dressup, and Sesame Park
- Lorne Michaels (B.A. 1966 U.C.) – creator and producer of Saturday Night Live
- Michelle Mohabeer (PhD 2005) – filmmaker
- Tom Perlmutter (M.B.A.) – Government Film Commissioner and chair of the National Film Board of Canada
- Mark Rowswell (B.A. 1988 U.C.) – media personality, one of the best-known Western performers in China
- Paul Saltzman (dropped out) – director, writer, and producer, Danger Bay, My Secret Identity, Meeting the Beatles in India (film)
- Caterina Scorsone (B.A. 2006) – actress, Grey's Anatomy
- David Shore (LL.B. 1982) – television screenwriter, House, Law & Order
- Frank Shuster (B.A. 1939 U.C.) – comedian, member of the comedy duo Wayne & Shuster
- Stephen Stohn (J.D. 1977) – Entertainment lawyer and television producer, president of Epitome Pictures, Degrassi: The Next Generation, Instant Star
- Donald Sutherland (B.A. 1958 Vic.) – actor, The Dirty Dozen, M*A*S*H (film), Ordinary People, JFK, Hunger Games
- Shelley Tepperman (B.A.) – translator
- Patrick Watson (M.A.) – broadcaster and television writer, Titans, The Watson Report, The Canadian Establishment, Heritage Minutes
- Johnny Wayne (B.A. 1940 U.C.) – comedian, member of the comedy duo Wayne & Shuster
- Elwy Yost (B.A. 1948) – television host, hosted Passport to Adventure series, Magic Shadows and Saturday Night at the Movies
- Graham Yost (B.A. 1980 Trin.) – screenwriter, Speed, Mission to Mars
- Richie Mehta (B.A. 2001 UTM) – film director and writer, Amal
- William Reeves (Ph.D.) – animator and technical director; one of the founding employees of Pixar
- André Dae Kim (B.A. UTM) – actor, Degrassi: The Next Generation, Vampire Academy
- Emily Hunter (HBA 2011 UTSC) – Environmental activist and filmmaker
- Vic Michaelis (UTSC) – comedian and host of Very Important People
- Nancy Newman (BA 1988 UTSC) – Emmy Award-winning sportscaster, anchor and reporter for YES, former reporter for CNN and NBC
- Derek Tsang (BA 2001 UTSC) – Oscar-nominated Hong-Kong based filmmaker and actor

=== Music, fine arts and architecture ===
- Ross Parmenter (B.A. 1933 Trin.) – music editor for The New York Times, expert on indigenous Mexican culture
- John Beckwith (B.Mus. 1947, M.Mus 1961, professor of music) – composer, writer and pianist, written over 130 compositions, Member of the Order of Canada
- Elmer Iseler (B.Mus. 1950) – conductor of the Toronto Mendelssohn Choir and founder of the Festival Singers of Canada
- Raymond Moriyama (B.Arch. 1954) – architect, winner of the Governor General's Award in Visual and Media Arts
- Teresa Stratas (Art Dip. Mus. 1959) – Soprano opera singer with the Metropolitan Opera
- Ellen Moffat (B.A.) – artist
- Paul Shaffer (B.A. 1971 U.C.) – Leader of the CBS Orchestra for the Late Show with David Letterman, former musical director of Saturday Night Live, co-writer of "It's Raining Men"
- Liona Boyd (B.Mus. 1972) – classical guitarist
- Gordon Slater – former Dominion Carillonneur of Canada, conductor of Divertimento Orchestra of Ottawa and bassoonist
- Maureen Batt (M.Mus.) – concert and opera artist
- Bruce Kuwabara (B.Arch. 1972) – architect, partner in the firm Kuwabara Payne McKenna Blumberg Architects (KPMB), recipient of the RAIC 2006 Gold Medal
- David J. Elliott (B.Mus., M.Mus., B.Ed.) – professor of music at New York University, Music Matters: A New Philosophy of Music Education
- Amy Sky (B.Mus. 1982) – singer, songwriter and actor
- Mychael Danna (B.Mus. 1986, B.Ed. 1987) – Academy Award, Golden Globe Award, and Emmy Award-winning film composer
- Barbara Hannigan (B.Mus. 1993, M.Mus. 1998) – Grammy Award-winning soprano, conductor
- Adrianne Pieczonka (B.Mus. 1988) – soprano opera singer, received the title Kammersängerin from the Austrian government, officer of the Order of Canada
- Doris McCarthy (B.A. 1989 UTSC) – artist, known for her landscape paintings
- Angela Su (B.Sc. 1990) – Hong Kong based artist
- Raine Maida (dropped out) – vocalist of the Canadian rock band Our Lady Peace
- Sophie Hackett (B.A.1994) – Curator of Photography at the Art Gallery of Ontario, Toronto
- Isabel Bayrakdarian (B.A.Sc. 1997) – opera singer
- Dan Snaith, Caribou
- Maggie MacDonald (B.A. U.C.) – playwright, musician and writer, member of the indie pop band The Hidden Cameras
- Owen Pallett (B.Mus. 2002) – composer, arranger, violinist, and singer-songwriter
- Measha Brueggergosman (B.Mus. 1999) – concert artist and opera singer
- Megan Bonnell (B.A.) – folk musician
- Mary Vingoe (M.A.) – playwright, theatre director, Officer of the order of Canada
- Agnes Chan (B.A.Ed. 1978) – singer, author, educator and actress
- Cameron Shahbazi – countertenor
- Norm Hacking (UTSC) – Canadian folk music singer-songwriter
- Cynthia Johnston Turner – Canadian conductor

== Education ==
- Abraham Lincoln McCrimmon (B.A. 1890) – chancellor of McMaster University, 1911–22
- P. E. MacKenzie (B.A., LL.B. 1893) – chancellor of the University of Saskatchewan, 1940–46
- Arthur Currie (dropped out) – president and vice chancellor of McGill University, 1920–33
- William Alexander Robb Kerr (B.A. 1899, M.A. 1901) – president of the University of Alberta, 1936–41
- Edward Wentworth Beatty (B.A.) – chancellor of McGill University, 1921–42, chancellor of Queen's University at Kingston, 1918–23
- Walter P. Thompson (B.A. 1910) – president of the University of Saskatchewan, 1949–59
- Gordon Shrum (B.A. 1919 Vic., M.A. 1921, Ph.D. 1923) – chancellor of Simon Fraser University, 1964–68
- Dana Porter (B.A. 1921) – chancellor of the University of Waterloo, 1960–66
- John Lowe (B.A. 1922 Trin.) – vice-chancellor of the University of Oxford, 1948–51, dean of Christ Church, Oxford, 1939–59
- John Josiah Robinette (B.A. 1926) – chancellor of Trent University, 1984–87
- Howard Hillen Kerr (B.A.Sc. 1926) – president of Ryerson Institute of Technology, 1948–66
- Carl Pollock (B.Eng.) – chancellor of the University of Waterloo, 1975–78
- Murray G. Ross (M.A. 1938) – president of York University, 1959–70
- Harry Gunning (B.A., M.A., Ph.D. 1942) – president of the University of Alberta, 1974–79
- Chien Wei-zang (Ph.D. 1942) – president of Shanghai University, 1982–
- Burt Matthews (B.A.Sc. 1947) – president of the University of Guelph, 1983–88, president of the University of Waterloo, 1970–81
- Josef Kates (B.A. 1948, M.A. 1949, Ph.D. 1951) – chancellor of the University of Waterloo, 1979–85
- William Arthur Cochrane (M.D. 1949) – president of the University of Calgary, 1974–78
- Douglas Tyndall Wright (B.A.Sc. 1949) – president of the University of Waterloo, 1981–93
- George Connell (B.A. 1951, Ph.D. 1955) – president of the University of Western Ontario, 1977–84
- Thomas Symons (B.A. 1951) – president and vice-chancellor of Trent University, 1961–72
- Ronald Lampman Watts (B.A. 1952 Trin.) – principal of Queen's University at Kingston, 1974–84
- H. Ian Macdonald (B.Comm. 1952) – president of York University, 1974–84
- Walter Pitman (B.A. 1952, M.A. 1954) – president of Ryerson Polytechnical Institute, 1975–80
- William Winegard (Ph.D. 1952) – president of the University of Guelph, 1967–75
- Harry Arthurs (B.A. 1955, LL.B. 1958) – president of York University, 1985–92
- David Strangway (B.A. 1956, M.A., Ph.D. 1960, 11th president) – president of Quest University, 2002–07, president of the University of British Columbia, 1985–97
- Donald Forster (B.A.) – president of the University of Guelph, 1975–83
- Norman Wagner (M.A. 1960, Ph.D. 1965) – president of the University of Calgary, 1978–88
- Peter George (B.A. 1962, M.A. 1963, Ph.D. 1967) – president of McMaster University, 1995–2010
- Susan Mann (B.A. 1963) – president of York University, 1992–97
- Robert Birgeneau (B.Sc. 1963) – former president of University of Toronto (2000–04), Chancellor of the University of California, Berkeley, 2004–
- Margaret MacMillan (B.A. 1966 Trin.) – warden of St Antony's College, Oxford, 2007–
- Emőke Szathmáry (B.A. St.M., Ph.D.) – president of the University of Manitoba, 1997–2008
- Lorna Marsden (B.A. 1968) – president of York University, 1997–2007, president of Wilfrid Laurier University, 1992–97
- Paul Davenport (M.A. 1970, Ph.D. 1976) – president of the University of Western Ontario, 1994–
- Michael W. Higgins (B.Ed. 1973) – president of St Thomas University
- Jon Dellandrea (B.Ed. 1976, M.Ed, Ed.D) – chancellor of Nipissing University, 2010–2016; vice-president of University Advancement, 1994–2005
- Doug Owram (Ph.D. 1976) – provost and vice-president of the University of Alberta, 1998–2003
- Ronald J. Daniels (B.A. 1982, J.D. 1986; dean of law) – president of Johns Hopkins University, 2009–; Provost of the University of Pennsylvania, 2005–09
- Joseph Cassidy (S.T.B., M.Div. 1986 Regis) – principal of St Chad's College, Durham, 1997–
- Satish K. Tripathi (M.Sc. 1976, Ph.D 1979) – president of the University at Buffalo, The State University of New York

== Business ==
- H. R. MacMillan (B.Sc. 1906 OAC) – founder of the H.R. MacMillan Export Company, Ltd, chairman of the Vancouver Board of Trade, 1933
- Murray Koffler (Phm.B. 1946) – founder of Shoppers Drug Mart
- William Arthur Cochrane (M.D. 1949) – chairman, president and CEO of Connaught Laboratories Limited, 1978–89, president of the University of Calgary, 1974–78
- Peter Munk (B.A.Sc. 1952) – founder and chairman of Barrick Gold
- John Robert Evans (M.D. 1952) – former president of Torstar
- Leslie Dan (B.Sc. 1954) – founder of Novopharm
- Edward Samuel Rogers (B.A. 1956 Trin.) – former president and CEO of Rogers Communications
- Marshall A. Cohen (B.A.) – president and CEO of Molson, 1988–96
- Richard M. Thomson (B.A.Sc.) – chairman and CEO of Toronto-Dominion Bank, 1978–97
- Peter Godsoe (B.Sc. 1961 Vic.) – president and CEO of Bank of Nova Scotia, 1992–2003; chairman of Fairmont Hotels and Resorts and Sobeys, chancellor of the University of Western Ontario, 1996–2000
- A. Charles Baillie (B.A. 1962 Trin.) – chief executive of Toronto-Dominion Bank, 1997–2002, president of Queen's University at Kingston, 2002–08
- Bernard Sherman (B.A.Sc. 1964) – founder, chairman and CEO of Apotex Inc., 1974–
- F. Anthony Comper (B.A. 1966 St.M.) – president and CEO of Bank of Montreal, 1990–2007
- David A. Galloway (B.A. 1966) – chairman of Bank of Montreal, 2004–, president and CEO of Torstar, 1988–2002, president and CEO of Harlequin Enterprises, 1983–88
- Daisy Ho (M.B.A. 1990) – chairman of SJM Holdings, executive director of Shun Tak Holdings
- Ron Brenneman (B.Eng. 1968) – president and CEO of Petro-Canada, 2005–
- W. Edmund Clark (B.A. 1969) – president and CEO of Toronto-Dominion Bank, 2002–2014
- Maureen Kempston Darkes (B.A. 1970 Vic., LL.B. 1973) – president of General Motors Latin America, Africa and Middle East
- Sergio Marchionne (B.A. U.C.) – CEO of Fiat S.p.A. and Chrysler Group, 2009–, chairman of European Automobile Manufacturers Association, 2006–
- Robert Prichard (LL.B. 1975) – president of Torstar, 2001–; 13th president of the University of Toronto
- Philip Orsino (B.A. 1976 Vic.) – president and CEO of Masonite International Corporation, 1989–2005
- Bill Downe (M.B.A. 1978) – president and CEO of Bank of Montreal, 2007–
- Ian Bennett (M.A.) – president and CEO of Royal Canadian Mint, 2006–
- Warren Adelman (B.A. Political Science & History) – president and chief operating officer of GoDaddy.com
- Jim Balsillie (B.Comm. 1984 Trin.) – co-chief executive of Research In Motion, 1992–
- Richard Nesbitt (M.B.A. 1985) – CEO of CIBC World Markets, 2008–, CEO of the TSX Group, which operates the Toronto Stock Exchange and the TSX Venture Exchange, 2004–08
- Jeffrey Skoll (B.A.Sc. 1987) – first president of eBay, philanthropist, founder & chairman of Participant Media
- Leonard Asper (LL.B. 1989) – president and chief executive of Canwest Global Communications
- Michael Serbinis (M.S.) – president and CEO of Kobo Inc.
- Robert Herjavec (B.A. 1984) – CEO of Herjavec Group, Dragons' Den dragon
- Clement Melville Keys – aeronautical entrepreneur; investor of Curtiss Aeroplane and Motor Company, China National Aviation Corporation, North American Aviation and TWA; first president of Curtiss-Wright
- Janice Fukakusa (B.A.) – chief financial officer (2004–2017) and chief administrative officer (2009–2017) of the Royal Bank of Canada
- Anthony Lacavera (B. Comp. Eng. 1997) – founder of Globalive and Wind Mobile
- Tenniel Chu (BA 1999 UTSC) – vice chairman of Mission Hills Group, owner and operator of the Mission Hills golf and leisure resorts in Shenzhen and on the island of Hainan, China
- Derrick Fung (BBA 2009 UTSC) – co-founder and former CEO of Tunezy, listed on Forbes' 30 under 30 in Music

== Humanitarianism, social work and others ==
- Omond Solandt (M.D.) – first chairman of the Canadian Defence Research Board, 1947–56, vice president for research and development at Canadian National Railways, 1956–63
- Rose Wolfe (B.A. 1938, diploma in social work 1939) – member of the Order of Ontario since 1992, and of the Order of Canada since 1999
- Anne Golden (B.A. 1962 U.C.) – administrator, president of the United Way of Canada, 1987–2001, former president and CEO of the Conference Board of Canada
- Mark Freiman (B.A. 1969, J.D. 1983) – president of the Canadian Jewish Congress, Deputy Attorney-General of Ontario and Deputy Minister Responsible for Native Affairs, 2000–04
- Hershell Ezrin (B.A.) – chief executive officer of the Canadian Council for Israel and Jewish Advocacy
- Paul Fromm (B.A. St.M., B.Ed., M.A.) – activist; alleged Canadian neo-Nazi leader with ties to the Ku Klux Klan
- David Weinberger (Ph.D.) – American technologist, professional speaker and commentator, co-author of The Cluetrain Manifesto and author of Small Pieces Loosely Joined
- Peter McLaren (B.Ed., Ph.D.) – key figure in critical pedagogy, professor of education at the University of California at Los Angeles
- Kamala-Jean Gopie (B.A. 1975, M.Ed. 1990) – political activist best known for her community activism in Toronto, president of the Jamaican Canadian Association, 1979–80
- Denis Rancourt (M.Sc. 1981, Ph.D. 1984) – former physics professor, scientist, academic dissident, anarchist and activist
- Rudyard Griffiths (B.A. 1993 Trin.) – public commentator and adviser, co-founder of the Dominion Institute, author of Who We Are: A Citizen's Manifesto
- Craig Kielburger (B.A. 2006 Trin.) – children's rights advocate; founder and chair of Free The Children
- Jaggi Singh (attended Trin.) – anti-globalization and social justice activist
- Kate Raynes-Goldie (BA Hons 2004) – internet scholar, game designer and industry evangelist
- Khaled al-Qazzaz (M.A.Sc.) – activist, educator, former civil servant in Egypt
- Loizza Aquino (BS 2021 UTSC) – mental health activist and founder of Peace of Mind Canada

== Athletics ==
- Conn Smythe (B.A.Sc. 1920) – NHL builder; principal owner of the Toronto Maple Leafs, 1927–61; builder of the Maple Leaf Gardens
- Stan Brown (D.M.D. 1922) – defenceman for the New York Rangers and the Detroit Cougars
- Talbot Hunter – college ice hockey, lacrosse, and soccer coach at Cornell, Yale, West Point, and Harvard
- Joseph Albert Sullivan (M.D. 1926) – ice hockey player, surgeon and politician; goaltender on the gold medalist hockey team at the 1928 Winter Olympics
- Father David Bauer (B.A. 1949) – founder of the Canada men's national ice hockey team, inductee into the Hockey Hall of Fame
- Bruce Kidd (B.A. 1965) – medalist in the 1962 British Empire and Commonwealth Games and competitor in the 1964 Summer Olympics
- Stan Butler (B.Ed. 1980) – hockey coach of North Bay Battalion
- Karl Svoboda (BPHE 1985) – Canadian National Team rugby player, played in 1987, 1991, and 1995 Rugby World Cups, received 'blues' in rugby and ice hockey from Oxford University
- Lori Dupuis (B.A. St.M.) – ice hockey player on gold medal-winning 2002 Winter Olympics team
- Jeffrey Buttle (B.Eng. on hiatus) – figure skater, 2008 World Figure Skating Champion and 2006 Winter Olympics bronze medalist
- John Fitzpatrick (B.Eng. 1933) – track and fielder, football player, engineer, and inventor; Fifth placer at the 1928 Summer Olympics Men's 100 meters event
- Aaron Milton – Canadian football player
- Crispin Duenas – Canadian recurve archer who represented Canada at the Summer Olympics in 2008, 2012, and 2016
- Gabriela Stafford (currently attending) – Canadian middle-distance runner; in July 2016 she was officially named to Canada's Olympic team
- Michelle Li – Hong Kong-born Canadian female badminton player on the 2016 and 2020 Canadian Olympic team
- Cary Kaplan (B.A 1992) – president and co-owner, Cosmos Sports & Entertainment
- Belinda Trussell (BComm 1994) – Canadian Olympic dressage rider, competed at the 2004 and 2016 Summer Olympics
- Claire Carver-Dias (BA 2002 UTM) – Canadian synchronized swimmer and Olympic medallist
- Josh Binstock (BPHE 2005) – beach volleyball player from Canada who qualified for the 2012 and 2016 Summer Olympics
- Donna Vakalis (March 2009) – Canadian modern pentathlete at the 2012 and 2016 Summer Olympics
- Kristina Valjas (BA 2010) – Canadian beach volleyball player with the Estonian ancestry, qualified to compete at the 2016 Summer Olympics
- Heather Bansley (B.A. 2010) – Canadian beach volleyball player, Canadian athlete at the 2016 Summer Olympics
- Saad Bin Zafar (BBA 2011 UTSC) – Canadian national cricket player, current captain of the Canada men's national team
- Rosie MacLennan (BPHE 2011) – Canadian trampoline gymnast; 2013 World Trampoline champion, 2012 and 2016 Olympic champion, and 2011 and 2015 Pan American Games champion in the individual trampoline event
- Alicia Brown (B.A. 2013) – Canadian track and field athlete competing in the sprint events, predominately the 400m event; in July 2016, she was officially named to Canada's Olympic team
- Vincent Wang (Biofrost) (BComm 2014) – Canadian League of Legends player; won the 2016 and 2020 NA LCS Summer Splits with Team SoloMid
- Jason Burnett (BA 2015) – Canadian trampoline gymnast; has placed first in the Canadian National Championships eight times in individual trampoline; won a silver medal in the 2008 Olympic Games; competed at the 2012 and 2016 Summer Olympics
- Kilian Elkinson (born 1990) – Bermudian footballer
- Kylie Masse – Canadian competition swimmer who tied for the bronze medal at the 2016 Summer Olympics
- Sasha Gollish (B.A. in Economics, Masters of Engineering, and current PhD candidate in Civil Engineering Education) – competitive runner, Pan American Games bronze medalist, Maccabiah Games gold medalist
- Bob Nadin (Physical and Health Education) – ice hockey referee, inductee into IIHF Hall of Fame
- W. F. Taylor (Faculty of Dentistry graduate) – founder of the Canadian Amateur Hockey Association
- Katherine Henderson — president and CEO of Curling Canada and Hockey Canada
- Justine Blainey-Broker, ice hockey player for the Toronto Lady Blues (BS 1995)
- Ruvindu Gunasekera (UTSC) – Canada national cricket team player
- Cindy Nicholas (UTSC) – marathon swimmer and former MPP of Scarborough Centre
- Victoria Nolan "the metronome" (B.Sc. 1996 UTSC) – rower for Canada's National Adaptive Rowing Team, bronze, silver and gold medals at the World Rowing Championships
- Gord Stellick (UTSC) – sports broadcaster and former Toronto Maple Leafs General Manager

== Criminals ==
- Paul Bernardo (UTSC) – also known as the "Scarborough Rapist"
- Russell Williams (UTSC) – graduated with a degree in economics and political science and became a colonel in the Royal Canadian Air Force; later convicted of the rape of and murder of multiple women
