= P. E. MacKenzie =

- Born: January 9, 1872; London, Ontario, Canada
- Died: June 19, 1946 (aged 74); Regina, Saskatchewan, Canada
- Spouse: Agnes Strickland Vicars
- Parent(s): Philip MacKenzie and Elizabeth Langley

Philip Edward MacKenzie (January 9, 1872 – June 19, 1946), joined the firm McCraney & Hutchinson in 1909 as barrister which then became, McCraney, McKenzie and Hutchinson. P.E. McKenzie was an agent for the attorney general for the judicial district of Saskatoon (1911–21). The firm remained McCraney, McKenzie and Hutchinson until 1921, when P.E. MacKenzie became King's Bench Judge at Regina. He held a term of office on the University of Saskatchewan board of governors from 1920 to 1940. He became the third chancellor of the University of Saskatchewan, and served in this position until his unexpected illness and passing in 1946.

== Biography ==
P.E. MacKenzie attended Collegiate Institute, London, Ontario. He received his BA from the University of Toronto in 1893, and an LLB in 1895. He was called to the bar in Ontario as of 1896. He later received an appointment to become the Crown attorney of Kenora District in Saskatchewan.

Mackenzie died on June 19, 1946, at Regina General Hospital, in Regina, Saskatchewan.

== Other honours ==
The P. E. Mackenzie Entrance Scholarship was set up in his honour.

== See also ==
- List of University of Saskatchewan alumni
- List of University of Toronto people

== Notes ==
Academic offices
Preceded by Frederick W. A. G. Haultain	Chancellor of the University of Saskatchewan; 1940–1946	Succeeded by Donald Maclean (judge)
Preceded by W. J. Bell	Member of the Board of Governors of the University of Saskatchewan by appointment date 1920–1940	Succeeded by D. Maclean
