= Florence McConney =

Canadian physician

Dr. Florence Spaulding Hardy McConney
- Born: September 20, 1894; Lindsey, Ontario, Canada
- Died: June 23, 1981 (aged 86)
- Education: University of Toronto (BA, 1917; M.D., 1920)
- Occupation: Physician
- Years active: 1920-1958
- Employer(s): Women’s College Hospital, St. Michael’s Hospital

Florence Spaulding Hardy McConney (20 September 1894 – 23 June 1981) was a Canadian physician. She was the Chief of Medicine at Women's College Hospital from 1935-1950, as well as the first director of the hospital’s Cancer Detection Clinic from 1948-1958.

== Early life and education ==
McConney was born on 20 September 1894 in Lindsay, Ontario, and moved to Toronto at the age of nine. She attended Moulton Ladies' College graduating at fifteen, three years before she could be admitted to university. She attended Jarvis Collegiate until she could attend the University of Toronto, graduating with a BA in 1917, the same year she married. Her husband served in World War I, and McConney began medical school while he was overseas. She earned her MD in 1920. McConney became a fellow of the American College of Physicians in 1950.

== Career ==
McConney began work with Women's College Hospital in 1922 following her internship at St. Michael's Hospital in Toronto. McConney became the hospital’s Chief of Medicine in 1935. She was certified by the Royal College of Physicians and Surgeons of Canada and the Ontario College of Physicians as a specialist in internal medicine in 1944 and 1945 respectively. McConney retired as Chief in Medicine of Women's College Hospital in 1950 at the age of 55, succeeded by Jessie Gray. She also ran a private practice. Following her retirement from the College Hospital she became the director of the Cancer Detection Clinic.
