= Janet Yale =

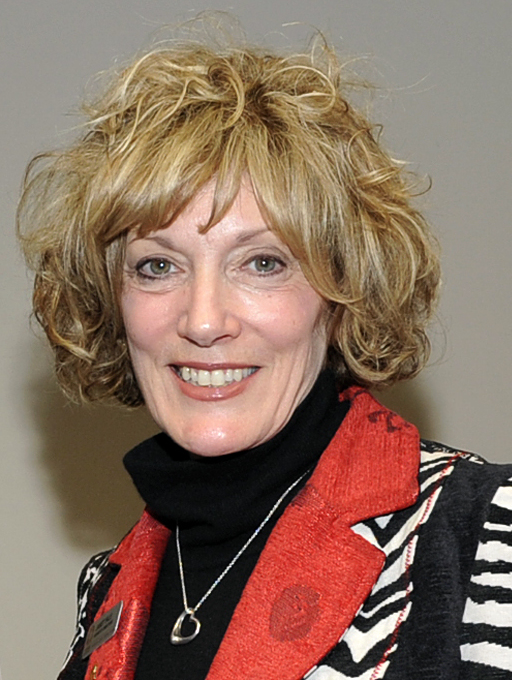
Janet Yale in 2013

Janet Yale is a Canadian telecommunications lawyer and association executive. She became president and chief executive officer of the Arthritis Society in June 2012. She is also on the board of directors of CARE Canada.

From September 2010 to November 2011, she was CEO of Scouts Canada. She left Scouts Canada in November 2011, citing "philosophical differences" with its board of directors, rather than media reports of how Scouts Canada had handled allegations of sexual abuse by scout leaders.

== Early life and education ==
Janet Yale was born in Montreal, Quebec, and went to Town of Mount Royal High School. She later studied and obtained her Bachelor from McGill University and the University of Toronto.

== Career ==
During her career, she would also work for Telus as Executive Vice President, a Canadian telecommunication company, the Canadian Cable Television Association, Director General of the Canadian Radio-television and Telecommunications Commission and General Counsel at the Consumers' Association of Canada.

In 2007 Yale gave a $75,000 donation to build the Lorraine Fritzy Yale Gallery at the Great Canadian Theatre Company in Ottawa in honour of her mother, Lorraine Fritzy Yale.

She received the Queen Elizabeth II Diamond Jubilee Medal and was board member of Ottawa Art Gallery.

In June 2018, she was appointed by the federal Ministers of Innovation, Science and Economic Development and Canadian Heritage to serve as Chair of The Broadcasting and Telecommunications Legislative Review Panel.

She was also named as one of Canada's 100 most powerful women by the Women's Executive Network, and inducted into the Hall of Fame in 2007.
