= David Megginson =

Canadian software consultant and developer

David Megginson (born 1964) is a Canadian computer software consultant and developer, specializing in open-source software development and application. He was the lead developer and original maintainer of the Simple API for XML (SAX), a leading streaming API for XML.

Megginson has been part of the SGML, and then XML, communities since 1991.

For the World Wide Web Consortium, he served as chair of the XML Information Set Working Group, and as a member of both the XML Working Group and XML Co-ordination Group.

In 2000, Sun Microsystems and JavaPro magazine awarded Megginson the Java Technology Achievement Award For Outstanding Individual Contribution to the Java Community.

He made significant contributions to other open source software projects including FlightGear (a cross-platform flight simulator making use of XML), the NewsML Toolkit library for NewsML, the XMLWriter libraries for Perl and Java, RDF Filter, and SGMLSpm (a mid-1990s precursor to many XML functionalities).

Megginson is also known for providing the first response to Andrew S. Tanenbaum's "Linux is obsolete." Usenet post. His response then evolved into the famous Tanenbaum–Torvalds debate.

He is an instrument-rated private pilot, and maintains weblogs about technology and small-plane aviation. Formerly employed by the University of Ottawa, he maintains his consulting and development practice in Ottawa, Ontario.

== Publications ==
- Structuring XML Documents. Prentice Hall. 1998. ISBN 0-13-642299-3. An advanced guide focusing on XML and SGML document type definitions.
- Imperfect XML: Rants, Raves, Tips, and Tricks ... from an Insider. Addison-Wesley Professional. 2004. ISBN 0-13-145349-1. A broad exploration of XML applications and standards.
