= Wladyslaw Metanomski =

Polish chemist

Wladyslaw "Val" Metanomski (1923–2008) was a chemist of Polish descent who was born in Vienna, Austria, educated in London, began his chemical career in Canada, and spent the remainder of his career in the United States. He is chiefly noted for his extensive service in making the results of chemical research more available to succeeding investigators.

== Life ==
Metanomski was born in Vienna in 1923 of Polish parents. As a teenager when Germany invaded Poland he was transported to Siberia in a cattle car. When Germany made significant advances east, the Russians pulled general Władysław Anders out of prison. The general gathered a Polish force that included bringing Val back from Siberia. Val trained in Egypt and Persia (Iran). As a member of that force he participated in the 1944 Battle of Monte Cassino in Italy. At the conclusion of World War II he moved to London, receiving a B.S. degree in chemical engineering in 1952.

His first position after graduation was with the Dearborn Chemical Company in Toronto, Ontario (1952–1958). He interrupted his career (1958–1964) to obtain an M.S. degree in chemical engineering (1960) and a Ph.D. degree in polymer chemistry (1964) from the University of Toronto.

Upon graduation from U of T, Metanomski joined the Editorial Division of the US Chemical Abstracts Service (1964). During his long service there (until November 2008) he developed vocabulary control and helped refine that service's publications.

Metanomski remained active in his profession until four weeks before his death. He died on 11 December 2008 at Columbus, Ohio. His wife Helena (married 1964) died 37 days later (16 January 2009). He is survived by daughter Marianne and two grandchildren Ray and Natasha.

== Awards and honors ==
- Metanomski was honored with a career profile in the online version of Chemical & Engineering News, 11 June 2007, as part of its coverage of the 100th anniversary of the Chemical Abstracts Service.
- Metanomski received the ACS Columbus Section award - for a lifetime of service to the chemical information profession.
- Metanomski received a Meritorious Service award from the ACS Division of Chemical Information (CINF) in 1992.
- Metanomski received the ACS Division of Polymer Chemistry's Distinguished Service award in 1995.
- Metanomski received the CINF Lifetime Membership award in 2006.

== Publications and service ==
- Metanomski was chair of the CINF (1987).
- Metanomski published 50 Years of Chemical Information in the American Chemical Society, 1943–93, on the 50th anniversary of CINF.
- Metanomski was member of the ACS Nomenclature Committee since 1990, and served on the editorial advisory board of its monthly journal (now titled Journal of Chemical Information & Modeling).
- Metanomski participated in the International Union of Pure and Applied Chemistry (IUPAC) as member of the Commission on Macromolecular Nomenclature (1987–1999).
- Metanomski participated in the IUPAC as secretary of its Interdivisional Committee on Nomenclature & Symbols (1996–1999). See for example his report "Unusual Names Assigned to Chemical Substances" presented at the 101-st National Meeting of the ACS on April 14, 1986, and published in "Chemistry International" (the newsmagazine of IUPAC), 1987, vol. 9, No 6, pp 211–215.
