= John Valk =

Canadian philosophy scholar

John Valk is a Canadian philosophy scholar and former professor of philosophy at University of New Brunswick. Valk graduated from University of Toronto with a PhD in religious studies. He was professor at University of Brunswick between 2000 and 2022. Valk co-wrote An Islamic Worldview from Turkey: Religion in a Modern, Secular and Democratic State with Halis Albayrak and Mualla Selçuk.
