= Marie D'Iorio =

Canadian physicist

- Education: B.Sc., Physics, University of Ottawa; M.A., PhD., Solid State Physics, University of Toronto
- Spouse: Rob Douglas
- Scientific career
- Institutions: University of Alberta; University of Ottawa; Canadian Association of Physicists; National Research Council of Canada
- Thesis: Fast Fourier transform chlorine nuclear quadrupole resonance spectroscopy. (1982)

Marie D'Iorio FRSC is a Canadian physicist. She is a Senior Strategy Advisor at the University of Ottawa and President of Deep Tech Canada. She was elected to the Royal Society of Canada in 2006 and served as president of its Academy of Science. She was made a Fellow of the Canadian Association of Physicists in 2024.

== Career ==
After earning her Bachelor of Science, D'Iorio spent three summers studying pulse radiolysis of biological molecules bombarded with a linear accelerator. She developed an interest in multidisciplinary research and chose to study under Robin Armstrong at the University of Toronto (UoT). D'Iorio later admitted that her interest in multidisciplinary research nearly jeopardised her chance at earning a NSERC Centennial scholarship. After obtaining a Master's and Doctorate degree in Solid State Physics from UoT, she worked under K. Alex Müller at the IBM Zurich Research Laboratory. D'Iorio then joined the National Research Council of Canada (NRC) as a Research Associate in the Division of Physics, where she helped established Canada’s first very low temperature, high magnetic field laboratory to study quantum semiconductor devices. In 1998, she initiated and coordinated a project on organic materials for displays which later developed into her becoming the Director of Components Technologies at Institute for Microstructural Sciences.

In 1999, D'Iorio was elected to serve one term as President of the Canadian Association of Physicists. She then worked as the Director General of the National Research Council of Canada Institute for Microstructural Sciences from 2003 to 2011. D'Iorio was elected to the Royal Society of Canada in 2006. Prior to her election, she served as member of the boards of National Capital Institute for Telecommunications and of Agile All Photonics Network; member of the scientific committee of the Canadian Institute for Photonics Innovation. From 2006 until 2011, she was also a member of the NRC Vision 2006-2011 team.

In 2012, she was named the Executive Director of Canada's National Institute for Nanotechnology and elected to the Royal Society of Canada's Executive Committee. She was also the recipient of the Queen Elizabeth II Diamond Jubilee Medal. She left the Council of Canadian Academies Board of Governors in 2014 and was replaced by Graham Bell. D'Iorio left the National Institute for Nanotechnology in 2016 to become Senior Strategy Advisor with the Office of the Vice President Research at the University of Ottawa. She also founded Deep Tech Canada (then under the name Nanocanada), a nonprofit connecting the actors in the nanotechnology sector of which she is President. In September 2025, she was appointed as the Canadian Association of Physicists' Chair of the Recognitions Committee.
