= List of University of Toronto faculty =

The following is a partial list of University of Toronto faculty, including current, former, emeritus, and deceased faculty and administrators at University of Toronto from its three campuses in the Greater Toronto Area of Ontario, Canada.

To avoid redundancy, alumni who hold or have held faculty positions in the University of Toronto are placed on the list of alumni, and do not appear on this list of faculty.

== Natural sciences and mathematics ==
=== Mathematics ===
- John Lighton Synge (assistant professor of mathematics, 1920–25) – Irish mathematician, member of the London Mathematical Society, former treasurer of the Royal Irish Academy
- Harold Scott MacDonald Coxeter (professor of mathematics, 1936–80) – Geometer with major contributions in polytopes, non-Euclidean geometry, group theory and combinatorial theory, for whom the Coxeter group is named
- W. T. Tutte (professor of mathematics, 1948–62) – mathematician and cryptographer who deduced the German Lorenz SZ 40/42 (Tunny) machine; namesake of Tutte's theorem on perfect matchings, Tutte matrix, Tutte graph, Tutte–Coxeter graph, Tutte 12-cage and Tutte fragment
- Abraham Robinson (professor of mathematics, 1951–57) – mathematician who developed non-standard analysis
- Chandler Davis (professor of mathematics, 1962–) – mathematician, writer and educator, one of the co-Editors-in-Chief of the Mathematical Intelligencer
- Hans Heilbronn (professor of mathematics, 1964–75) – mathematician who devised the Davenport-Heilbronn method
- Walter Warwick Sawyer (professor of mathematics, 1965–76) – mathematician, known for his semi-popular works in Mathematician's Delight
- Lionel Cooper (professor of mathematics, 1965–66) – South African mathematician who worked in various fields including operator theory, transform theory and differential equations
- Maria Klawe (professor of mathematics) – mathematician, Fellow of the Association for Computing Machinery
- Pierre Milman (professor of mathematics, 1986–) – mathematician, Fellow of the Royal Society of Canada, recipient of the Jeffery-Williams Prize
- Dror Bar-Natan (professor of mathematics, 2002–) – researcher in knot theory, finite type invariants and Khovanov homology

=== Medicine and dentistry ===
- Benjamin Alman (professor of surgery) – orthopaedic surgeon and researcher in developmental signaling pathways in musculoskeletal tumours
- Anne S. Bassett (professor of psychiatry)– Canada Research Chair in Schizophrenia Genetics and Genomic Disorders and Clinician Scientist at CAMH
- Morton Beiser (professor of cultural pluralism and health, 1991–2009) – psychiatrist and epidemiologist, noted for his research in immigration and resettlement
- Harry Botterell (professor of neurophysiology, 1936–39) – neurosurgeon, head of neurosurgery at the Toronto General Hospital, 1953–62
- Manuel Buchwald (professor of molecular and medical genetics, 1973–86) – geneticist who identified the gene that causes Fanconi anemia and, with Lap-Chee Tsui, that which causes cystic fibrosis
- Rob Buckman (professor of medicine, 1985–) – medical oncologist and comedian; president of the Humanist Association of Canada
- Frederick J. Conboy (professor of dentistry) – 47th Mayor of Toronto, secretary of the Ontario Dental Association and editor of the association's journal
- Tirone E. David (professor of surgery, 1980–) – cardiovascular surgeon who developed the reimplantation technique for valve-sparing aortic root replacement
- John Macleod (professor of physiology, 1918–28) – physician and physiologist; recipient of the Nobel Prize for the discovery of insulin
- Paula Rochon – Chair in Geriatric Medicine
- Louis Siminovitch (professor of medical genetics and microbiology, 1956–85) – molecular biologist; founding director of research at Samuel Lunenfeld Research Institute; foreign associate to the National Academy of Sciences
- James Till (professor of medical biophysics, 1958–97) – biophysicist; academic on Internet research ethics and the Open Access movement
- Charles Hollenberg (professor of medicine, 1970–81) – physician, educator and researcher, former Physician-in-Chief of the Toronto General Hospital
- Saul V. Levine (professor of psychiatry, 1970–93) – psychiatrist, former Senior Psychiatrist at the Hospital for Sick Children
- David MacLennan (professor of medicine, 1974–) – biochemist who made fundamental contributions to our understanding of the mechanism of ion transport by SR calcium pumps
- Tak Wah Mak (professor of medical biophysics, 1975–) – immunologist who discovered the T-Cell receptor, and was the first to clone the genes for the receptor
- Jack Greenblatt (professor of molecular medicine, 1977–) – pioneer in research on protein-protein interactions and on mechanisms that regulate gene expression
- Janet Rossant (professor of medical genetics, 1985–) – developmental biologist known for research in the role of genes in early embryo development
- Anthony Pawson (professor of molecular and medical genetics, 1985–) – microbiologist specializing in mechanisms for protein-protein interactions in intracellular signal transduction
- John E. Dick (professor of molecular genetics) – scientist who first identified the cancer stem cell in leukemia and later colorectal cancer; also known for demonstrations with blood stem cells in mice
- Peter St. George-Hyslop (professor of medicine, 1991–) – geneticist who isolated the key genes linked to inherited and early-onset forms of Alzheimer's disease
- Ahmad Teebi (professor of pediatrics and medical genetics, 1998–) – Head of the Section of Clinical Genetics & Dysmorphology at the Hospital for Sick Children
- David Jaffray (associate professor of radiation physics) – medical physicist, Senior Scientist in the Division of Biophysics and Bioimaging at the Ontario Cancer Institute
- David J. Jenkins (professor of nutritional sciences) – nutritionist who developed the concept of glycemic index (GI)
- Gideon Koren (professor of pediatrics, pharmacology and pharmacy) – pediatrician, clinical pharmacologist and toxicologist, Senior Scientist of the Canadian Institutes of Health Research
- John W. Semple (professor of pharmacology) – medical researcher at St. Michael's Hospital, co-discoverer of immune thrombocytopenic purpura (ITP)
- Harvey Skinner (former professor and dean of public health sciences) – psychologist; Dean of Health, York University since 2006; one of the first to link behaviour change, organizational improvement and information technology (e-health)
- Rachel Tyndale (professor in the Departments of Psychiatry, and Pharmacology and Toxicology), Senior Scientist and Head of Pharmacogenetics in the Campbell Family Mental Health Research Institute at the Centre for Addiction and Mental Health
- Gelareh Zadeh (professor in the Department of Surgery)

=== Physics, chemistry and astronomy ===
- Aaron Wheeler (professor of Chemistry, 2005– ) – Analytical chemis; well-known for developing the Digital Microfluidics and he is the current Editor-in-chief for flagship Journal of Lab on chip
- Helen Sawyer Hogg (professor of astronomy, 1936–76) – astronomer; authority in the field of variable stars within globular clusters
- Leopold Infeld (professor of physics, 1939–50) – physicist and peace activist; co-formulated the equation describing star movements and co-author of The Evolution of Physics with Albert Einstein
- Lloyd Montgomery Pidgeon (professor of metallurgy, 1943–69) – chemist who developed the Pidgeon process of magnesium metal production via a silicothermic reduction
- Donald Ivey (professor of physics, 1949–1992) – physicist and science educator, former host of The Nature of Things with Patterson Hume, principal of New College (1963–1974)
- Andrew McKellar (visiting professor of physics, 1952–53) – astronomer noted for his work in molecular spectroscopy, former president of the Astronomical Society of the Pacific and the Royal Astronomical Society of Canada
- John Charles Polanyi (professor of chemistry, 1956–) – physical chemist credited with developing the technique of infrared chemiluminescence to explain energy relationships in chemical reactions
- Sidney van den Bergh (professor of astronomy, 1958–77) – astronomer who discovered Andromeda II; former president of the Canadian Astronomical Society
- Alan West Brewer (professor of physics, 1962–77) – physicist and climatologist, whose observation of the stratosphere resulted in the Brewer-Dobson circulation model
- Ursula Franklin (professor of metallurgy and materials science, 1965–89) – physicist who pioneered use of modern techniques of material analysis in archaeometry; pacifist and humanitarian since retirement
- Eduard Prugovecki (professor of physics, 1967–97) – mathematical physicist in geometro-stochastic theory
- Robert H. Morris (professor of chemistry) – organometallic chemist.
- Douglas Stephan, FRS (professor of chemistry) – organometallic chemist.
- Robert K. Logan (professor of physics, 1968–2005) – physicist and media ecologist, best known for his research in media ecology and the evolution of language, The Alphabet Effect
- Charles Thomas Bolton (professor of astronomy, 1973–2021) – astronomer who was the first to present evidence of a black hole's existence in Cygnus X-1, later confirmed as the first black hole candidate
- Scott Tremaine (professor of astronomy, 1985–97) – astrophysicist and contributor to the theory of solar system and galactic dynamics; first director of the Canadian Institute for Theoretical Astrophysics
- Sajeev John (professor of physics, 1989–) – together with Eli Yablonovitch, identified photonic crystals as a class of materials designed to affect the motion of photons
- Daniel Lidar (associate professor of chemistry, 2000–05) – chemist and physicist, known for his research on control of quantum systems and quantum information processing
- John Moffat (professor of physics, retired) – physicist, noted for his work on gravity and cosmology suggesting that the speed of light has varied in the past
- Ray Jayawardhana (professor of astronomy, 2005–) – astronomer and Holder of the Canada Research Chair in observational astrophysics who reported the first direct image and spectroscopy of a likely extra-solar planet around a normal star
- Roberto Abraham (professor of astronomy) – astronomer best known for his work on high-redshift galaxy morphology

=== Biology and ecology ===
- Bernhard Fernow (dean of forestry, 1907–19) – American conservationist; chief of forestry in the United States Department of Agriculture, 1886–98; editor-in-chief of the Journal of Forestry
- Charles Caccia (professor of forestry, 1955–68) – Politician, member of Parliament for Davenport, 1968–2004
- Tak Wah Mak (professor of biophysics and immunology, 1984–) – award-winning biochemist and geneticist, widely known for his pioneering work in the genetics of immunology
- Anthony Pawson (professor of molecular genetics, 1985–) – geneticist whose research has revolutionized the understanding of signal transduction
- Sara Shettleworth (professor of ecology, evolutionary biology and psychology) – zoologist and psychologist, Guggenheim Fellow, American Psychological Association Distinguished Scientist Lecturer
- Herbert Kronzucker (Distinguished Professor of Plant Biology) – Canada Research Chair, inaugural director and founder of Canadian Centre for World Hunger Research.

=== Engineering and computer science ===
- Robert Legget (professor of engineering, 1936–47) – civil engineer, historian and non-fiction writer, founding President of the Canadian Academy of Engineering
- Allan Borodin (professor of computer science, 1969–) – mathematician and computational theorist in computational complexity theory and algorithms. Awarded University Professorship: university's top honour
- Michael P. Collins (professor of civil engineering, 1969–) – structural engineer; expert on the design and evaluation of reinforced and prestressed concrete under shear stress
- Stephen Cook (professor of computer science, 1970–) – recipient of the Turing Award for formalizing the notion of NP-completeness through Cook's theorem
- Charles Rackoff (professor of computer science) – noted modern cryptologist, won the Godel Prize for his work on interactive proof systems and zero-knowledge proofs
- Geoffrey Hinton (professor of computer science, 1987–98, 2001–) – informatician who co-introduced the backpropagation algorithm, the Boltzmann machine and the Helmholtz machine; known as the "Godfather of AI"
- Steve Mann (professor of computer engineering) – researcher in chirplet transform, comparametric equations and sousveillance; pioneer in wearable computers
- Renée J. Miller (professor of computer science, 2000–) – Fellow of the Association for Computing Machinery (ACM)
- Mark Chignell (professor of mechanical and industrial engineering, 1990–) – researcher who co-introduced the concept of intelligent databases
- Ric Holt (professor of computer science, −1997) – one of the original developers of the Turing programming language, Euclid programming language, SP/k, and of the S/SL programming language
- Marzyeh Ghassemi (assistant professor of computational medicine, 2018–) – developer of machine-learning algorithms to inform health-care decisions
- Joseph C. Paradi (senior professor of chemical engineering, 1983 -) – founder and executive director of the Centre for Management of Technology and Entrepreneurship
- Demetri Terzopoulos FRS FRSC (professor of computer science and electrical & computer engineering, 1989–2005) – Academy Award winning computer scientist, university professor, author, and entrepreneur
- Sanja Fidler (professor of computer science, UTM) – Director of AI at NVIDIA, co-founder of the Vector Institute
- Molly Shoichet (professor and Canada Research Chair in tissue engineering) – specialist in chemistry, biomaterials and biomedical engineering

=== Earth science ===
- Arthur Philemon Coleman (professor of geology, 1901–22) – geologist, former President of the Geological Society of America, recipient of the Murchison Medal, Flavelle Medal and Penrose Medal, fellow of the Royal Society of Canada
- Cole Harris (professor of geography, 1964–71) – former president of the Canadian Association of Geographers and recipient of the Massey Medal
- Anthony J. Naldrett (professor of geology, 1967–98) – former President of the Society of Economic Geologists, the International Mineralogical Association and the Geological Society of America
- Thomas Edvard Krogh (professor of geology, 1976–96) – Geochronologist who developed new techniques of radiometric uranium-lead dating for Precambrian rocks
- Petr Vaníček (professor of geodesy) – Geodesist and theoretical geophysicist, made significant breakthroughs in theory of spectral analysis and geoid computation

== Social sciences ==
=== Anthropology and geography ===
- Edmund Snow Carpenter (professor of anthropology, 1948–57) – anthropologist known for his work on tribal art and visual media
- Isaac Schapera (visiting professor of anthropology, 1953) – academic from the London School of Economics and leading scholar in the anthropology of South African tribesmen
- George Michael Wickens (professor of Middle Eastern studies, 1957–84) – prolific Iranologist and translator of Persian literature; founding chair of the university's department of Near and Middle Eastern civilizations
- Cole Harris (assistant professor of geography, 1964–71) – geographer, winner of the Massey Medal, fellow of the Royal Society of Canada
- Lee Maracle (professor of Aboriginal studies) – First Nations poet and author, recipient of the American Book Award
- Marcel Danesi (professor of semiotics and linguistic anthropology) – Italian-Canadian semiotician
- David H. Turner (professor of anthropology) – anthropologist who focuses on comparative religion and the role of music in the indigenous societies of Australia, North America, Africa, and India

=== Sociology and psychology ===
- Mary Louise Northway (assistant professor of psychology, 1933–1963) – psychologist known for her research in sociometry
- Seymour Martin Lipset (lecturer of sociology, 1946–48) – American political sociologist; senior fellow at the Hoover Institution
- Dennis Wrong (professor of sociology) – American sociologist, Power: Its Forms, Bases and Uses, annual award for the best graduate paper in sociology at NYU is named after him
- Barry Wellman (professor of sociology, 1967–) – sociologist; founder of the International Network for Social Network Analysis, former president of the Sociological Research Association
- Anatol Rapoport (professor of mathematics and psychology, 1970–79) – mathematical psychologist; founding professor of the Trudeau Centre for Peace and Conflict Studies
- Fergus I. M. Craik (professor of psychology, 1971–) – cognitive psychologist known for research on levels of processing in memory
- Jordan Peterson (professor of psychology, 1998–) – clinical psychologist known for cultural critiques
- Morris Moscovitch (professor of psychology, 1971–) – leading neuropsychologist, Senior Scientist at the Rotman Research Institute of Baycrest Centre for Geriatric Care
- Dorothy E. Smith (professor of sociology, retired) – sociologist, founder of the sociological sub-disciplines of feminist standpoint theory and institutional ethnography
- William Johnson (professor of sociology) – academic, journalist and author, former parliamentary correspondent for The Globe and Mail and journalist for the Montreal Gazette
- Rinaldo Walcott (associate professor, 2002–) – academic, writer, Canada Research Chair of Social Justice and Cultural Studies
- Paul Garfinkel (professor, 1982 -); psychiatrist, researcher and an academic leader
- Blossom Wigdor (professor, 1979–) – clinical psychologist, founded the university's gerontology program (the first of its kind in Canada)

=== Economics, management and political science ===
- James Mavor (professor of political economy, 1892–1923) – political economist and activist who was instrumental in assisting the emigration of the Doukhobors to Canada, and the establishment of the Royal Ontario Museum
- Harold Innis (professor of political economy, 1920–52) – political economist and communication theorist who developed the Staples thesis and time- and space-bias; former president of the American Economic Association
- James Mallory (lecturer of political economy, 1943–44) – academic and constitutional expert, fellow of the Royal Society of Canada, the Queen Elizabeth II Silver Jubilee Medal winner
- Peter H. Russell (professor of political science, 1958–96) – scholar on aboriginal peoples, constitutional politics and the Canadian Charter of Rights and Freedoms; president of the Canadian Law and Society Association
- Samuel Hollander (professor of economics, 1963–98) – scholar and author on the history of economic thought and classical economics
- Jean Edward Smith (professor of political economy, 1965–99) – noted biographer of Ulysses S. Grant and Franklin D. Roosevelt; John Marshall Professor of Political Science at Marshall University
- Jerry F. Hough (professor of political science, 1968–73) – researcher on American politics, the Soviet Union and the democratization of Russia
- John E. Floyd (professor of economics, 1970–) – scholar in international monetary economics
- Michael Trebilcock (professor of law, 1972–) – scholar specializing in law and economics, international trade law and competition law; president of the American Law and Economics Association
- Thomas Pangle (professor of political science, 1979–2004) – political scientist; holder of the Joe R. Long Chair in Democratic Studies at the University of Texas at Austin
- Janice Stein (professor of political science, 1983–) – director of the Munk Centre for International Studies
- Thomas Homer-Dixon (professor of political science 1990–2008) – director of the Trudeau Centre for Peace and Conflict Studies at the Munk School of Global Affairs
- Joseph Carens (professor of political science, 1985–) – political scientist who focuses on contemporary political theory; Culture, Citizenship and Community, A Contextual Exploration of Justice as Evenhandedness
- David Foot (professor of economics) – economist and demographer; author of Boom, Bust & Echo
- John C. Hull (professor of finance, 1988–) – prominent researcher in quantitative finance and co-developer of the Hull-White model
- Ronald Deibert (professor of political science) – researcher in Internet and human rights; director of the Citizen Lab and co-founder of the OpenNet Initiative
- David Rayside (professor of political science, 1974–present) – academic and activist; member of the Right to Privacy Committee; co-founder of the Canadian Lesbian and Gay Studies Association
- Ramin Jahanbegloo (professor of political science, 1997–2001, 2008–present) – Iranian intellectual and academic; recipient of the Peace Prize from the United Nations Association
- Allan S. Detsky (professor of public health policy, management and evaluation) – physician and health policy expert, Physician-in-Chief at Mount Sinai Hospital, Toronto
- Mel Watkins (professor of economics and political science, retired) – political economist and activist, founder and co-leader of the Waffle
- Gad Horowitz (professor of political science) – political scientist who specialized in labour theory, most notably counted the appellation "Red Tory"
- Clifford Orwin (professor of political science) – political scientist of ancient, modern, contemporary and Jewish political thought; Guggenheim Fellow

== Humanities ==
=== Philosophy and classics ===
- James Mark Baldwin (chair of logic and metaphysics, 1889–92) – American philosopher and psychologist, important contributor to psychology, psychiatry and the theory of evolution
- Eric A. Havelock (professor of classics, 1929–47) – British classicist; author, History of the Greek Mind
- Paul Churchland (lecturer of philosophy, 1967–69) – philosopher, noted for his works in neurophilosophy and the philosophy of mind, major proponent of eliminative materialism
- Timothy Barnes (professor of classics, 1970–2007) – classicist specializing in Christianity in the Later Roman Empire
- Allan Bloom (professor of political science, 1970–79) – American philosopher and critic of contemporary higher education, best known for authoring The Closing of the American Mind
- James Allen Graff (professor of philosophy and ethics, 1970–2002) – founder of the Near East Cultural and Educational Foundation of Canada (NECEF), former vice-chair of the North American Co-ordinating Committee for NGOs on the Question of Palestine
- Ronald de Sousa (professor of philosophy, 1971–2005) – scholar in the philosophy of emotions, mind and biology
- Ian Hacking (professor of philosophy, 1982–) – noted member of the Stanford School of philosophers, known for bringing a historical approach to the philosophy of science, author of Rewriting the Soul: Multiple Personality and the Sciences of Memory
- Joseph Heath (professor of philosophy) – philosopher and author, The Rebel Sell
- James Tully (professor of philosophy, 2001–03) – distinguished political philosopher, fellow of the Royal Society of Canada
- James Robert Brown (professor of philosophy) – philosopher of science, Fellow of the Royal Society of Canada since 2007
- Bas van Fraassen (professor of philosophy) – philosopher, specializing in the philosophy of science, Laws and Symmetry, The Scientific Image
- Peter Ludlow (professor of philosophy) – philosopher, noted for his research in cyberspace, High Noon on the Electronic Frontier and Crypto Anarchy, Cyberstates, and Pirate Utopias
- Colin Howson (professor of philosophy, 2008–) – British philosopher, Scientific Reasoning: the Bayesian Approach
- M. Owen Lee (Father Owen Lee) – professor emeritus of classics
- Jennifer Whiting – Chancellor Jackman Professor of Philosophy, scholar of ancient philosophy
- Robert J. Zydenbos (professor of South Asian studies, philosophy and linguistics) – Dutch-Canadian scholar

=== Literature and linguistics ===
- Alister Cumming (professor of applied linguistics, 1999–) – known for adopting Goal theory to study second language writing development
- Marshall McLuhan (professor of English literature, 1946–79) – influential literary critic and communications theorist, known for coining the expressions "the medium is the message" and "global village"
- Robertson Davies (professor of literature, 1960–81) – novelist and playwright; founding master of Massey College; author of The Deptford Trilogy
- Angus Cameron (professor of literature, 1968–83) – linguist and lexicographer who initiated the Dictionary of Old English
- Josef Škvorecký (professor of literature, 1968–90) – leading contemporary Czech writer, winner of the Neustadt International Prize for Literature, Governor General's Award, a Guggenheim Fellow and a Fellow of the Royal Society of Canada
- Jack Chambers (professor of linguistic, 1970–) – linguist, expert on language variation and change, pioneered research on Canadian English and coined the term "Canadian raising"
- Christina Kramer (professor of Slavic languages, 1986–) – specialist in Balkan languages and semantics; former translator for the Berlitz Translation Service
- Suniti Namjoshi (professor of literature, 1972–mid 90s) – Indian writer
- George Elliott Clarke (professor of literature, 1999–) – poet, playwright, Whylah Falls
- Sonnet L'Abbe (professor of creative writing) – poet and critic, reviewer for The Globe and Mail, Bronwen Wallace Memorial Award recipient
- Michael Wex (professor of literature) – novelist, playwright, translator and performer, Born to Kvetch
- Elizabeth Cowper (professor of linguistics, 2004–) – linguist, specializing in tense and aspect in English and Spanish
- Northrop Frye (professor of English, 1939–91) – literary critic and literary theorist

=== History ===
- George MacKinnon Wrong (professor of history, 1894–1927) – historian and Anglican priest, Canada and the American Revolution: The Disruption of the First British Empire
- John Saywell (professor of history, 1954–62) – historian specializing in the fields of politics and constitution
- Fritz Heichelheim (professor of Greek and Roman history, 1962–68) – Ancient historian who specialized in ancient economic history
- Jill Ker Conway (professor of history, 1964–75) – Australian-American author, The Road from Coorain, True North; president of Smith College, 1975–85
- Ram Sharan Sharma (professor of history, 1965–66) – eminent historian of Ancient India who has been a historian of international repute founding chairperson of Indian Council of Historical Research
- Walter Goffart (professor of history, 1960–99) – historian who specializes in late Roman Empire, early Middle Ages and barbarian kingdoms
- Archibald Paton Thornton (professor of history, 1960–87) – academic and historian, author of The Imperial idea and its enemies: a study in British power
- Rick Salutin (professor of Canadian studies, 1978–) – novelist, playwright and critic, columnist for The Globe and Mail
- Natalie Zemon Davis (professor of history) – Canadian and American historian of early period; first woman president of the American Historical Association
- Derek Penslar (professor of Jewish history) – historian specializing in Jewish history; author of Contemporary Antisemitism
- Robert Johnson – Professor, former director of the Centre for Russian and East European Studies

=== Law ===
- Ron Atkey (professor of law) – legal academic and Member of the Canadian Parliament for St. Paul's, 1972–74, 1979–80
- Aharon Barak (professor of law) – President of the Supreme Court of Israel, 1995–2006, Attorney General of Israel, 1975–78
- Charles Dalfen (professor of law, 1972–74) – Chairperson of the Canadian Radio-television and Telecommunications Commission, 2002–06, legal advisor for the Government of Canada's Department of Communications, 1970–72
- Allan Leal (professor of law, 1972–77) – Chancellor of McMaster University, 1977–86, Deputy Attorney General of Ontario, 1977–81, Dean of Osgoode Hall Law School, 1958–66
- Frank Iacobucci (professor of law, 1967–82) – Puisne Justice, 1991–2004
- Ronald St. John Macdonald (professor of law, 1961–72) – legal academic and jurist, founding President of the Canadian Council on International Law, President of the World Academy of Art and Science, 1983–87
- Michael Mandel (professor of law) – legal academic specializing in criminal law, noted critic of the Canadian Charter of Rights and Freedoms
- Ed Morgan (professor of law), noted international law expert
- Caesar Wright (dean of the faculty of law, 1949–67) – prominent figure in the Canadian legal education reform, one of the first law professors to import the Harvard case method into Canadian legal education

=== Religious studies ===
- Donald Coggan (professor of theology, 1937–44) – 101st Archbishop of Canterbury, 1974–80
- Gregory Baum (professor of theology and sociology, 1959–86) – Roman Catholic theologian, Religion and Alienation, Officer of the Order of Canada
- Bernard Lonergan (professor of theology, 1965–75) – Jesuit priest, economist, Insight: A Study of Human Understanding
- Mary Jo Leddy (professor of theology, Regis College) – writer, theologian, social activist, founder of Catholic New Times
- Willard G. Oxtoby (professor of comparative religion, 1971–99) – founding director of the graduate centre for religious studies; author, World Religions: Western Traditions, World Religions: Eastern Traditions
- Julia Ching (professor of religion and philosophy, 1978–2001) – expert on the neo-Confucian philosophy of China
- Arti Dhand (professor of religion) – specialist in the Mahabharata and the Ramayana Hindu epics, Hindu ethics, gender issues in Hinduism, and religion and sexuality
- Thomas Worcester (professor of history) – President of Regis College, Toronto, specialist in the history of the Catholic Church and the Papacy

== Fine arts, music, drama and architecture ==
- Charles William Jefferys (professor of architecture, 1912–39) – painter and historical illustrator; co-founder of the Canadian Society of Graphic Art with Ivor Lewis
- Eric Arthur (professor of architecture 1923–66) – architect, member of the "Toronto's Hundred Years" Publication Committee, which published Toronto's 100 Years
- H. Allen Brooks (professor of the history of art) – architectural historian known for research on Frank Lloyd Wright, the Prairie School and Le Corbusier
- Baņuta Rubess (professor of drama, 2011–) – playwright and director
- Michelle Mohabeer (professor of film) – filmmaker and writer
- Djanet Sears (professor of drama, 2000–) – playwright, actor and director, won four Dora Mavor Moore Awards and one Governor General's Award

== Education ==
- Norman MacKenzie (professor of law, 1927–40) – President of the University of New Brunswick, 1940–44; president of the University of British Columbia, 1944–62
- David Lloyd Johnston (professor of law, 1968–74) – Principal of McGill University, 1979–94; president of the University of Waterloo, 1999–; dean of law at the University of Western Ontario, 1974–79
- Kenneth Hare (professor of geography and physics, 1969–88) – President of the University of British Columbia, 1968–69; chancellor of Trent University, 1988–95
- Thomas R. Williams (professor of education, 1970–77) – Principal of Queen's University, 2008–09
- Allan Leal (lecturer in property law, 1972–77) – Chancellor of McMaster University, 1977–86
- Donald Forster (professor of economics) – President of the University of Guelph, 1975–83
- Frederick Lowy (professor of psychiatry, 1974–80; dean of medicine, 1980–87) – President and vice-chancellor of Concordia University, 1995–2005
- Maria Klawe (professor of computer science, 1978–80) – President of Harvey Mudd College, 2006– ; dean of engineering and applied science at Princeton University, 2002–06; dean of science at the University of British Columbia, 1998–02
- Lap-Chee Tsui (professor of molecular and medical genetics, 1983–2002) – Vice-chancellor of the University of Hong Kong, 2002–14
- Heather Munroe-Blum (professor and dean of social work, 1994–2002) – Principal of McGill University, 2003–

== Business and public policy ==
- Harry Cassidy (professor of social work, 1929–34) – social reformer and civil servant who was influential in the creation of the Canadian welfare state
- Charles Dalfen (professor of law, 1972–74) – Chairman of the Canadian Radio-television and Telecommunications Commission, 2002–06
- James Fleck (professor of business-government relations, 1979–) – businessman and philanthropist; former chairman of ATI Technologies, director of AMD and Certicom
- Deborah Coyne (professor of law, 1986–88) – Constitutional lawyer who had worked in the Office of the Prime Minister, Business Council on National Issues and Ontario Human Rights Commission
- Roger Martin (professor of strategic management, 1998–) – former director of Monitor Group; dean of the Rotman School of Management
- Gunther Eysenbach (professor of health policy, 2002–) – researcher on Open access, health policy, eHealth and consumer health informatics
- Richard Florida (professor of business, 2007–) – economist and urban studies theorist who introduced the concept of the creative class
- Don Tapscott (professor of management) – business executive and consultant; author of Wikinomics
- Tony Dean – Canadian Senator appointed in 2016
- Thomas Homer-Dixon – former Director of Peace and Conflict Studies at the Munk School of Global Affairs
