= Aaron Wheeler =

Aaron Wheeler may refer to:

- Aaron Wheeler (soccer)
- Aaron Wheeler (basketball)
- Aaron Wheeler (chemist)
- Aaron Wheeler, member of Lydian Collective

== See also ==
- Aaron Wheeler House, Rehoboth, Massachusetts
