= Oxtoby =

Oxtoby is a surname. Notable people with the surname include:

- David Oxtoby (artist), b. 1938, British pop artist
- David W. Oxtoby, the ninth and current president of Pomona College
- John C. Oxtoby (1910–1991), American mathematician and professor at Bryn Mawr College
- Peter Oxtoby b. 1965, Telecoms Entrepreneur and Managing Director of T.James Telecoms 1999-2015
- John Oxtoby (1767–1830), English evangelist and Primitive Methodist preacher
- Tanya Oxtoby (born 1982), Australian football (soccer) player and coach
- Willard G. Oxtoby (1933–2003), founding director of the graduate Centre for Religious Studies at the University of Toronto
