= Schwartz Reisman Institute =

Research institute at the University of Toronto

Schwartz Reisman Institute for Technology and Society
- Formation: 2019; 7 years ago
- Type: Research centre
- Headquarters: Schwartz Reisman Innovation Campus
- Location: Toronto, Ontario, Canada
- Director: David Lie
- Parent organization: University of Toronto Faculty of Arts and Science
- Website: srinstitute.utoronto.ca

The Schwartz Reisman Institute for Technology and Society (SRI) is a research centre at the University of Toronto. It was founded in 2019 following a $100 million gift from Gerald Schwartz and Heather Reisman.

SRI's stated mission is to deepen understanding of technologies, societies, and what it means to be human. It aims to ensure that new technologies, particularly artificial intelligence (AI), are developed in ways that are safe, ethical, and beneficial to society. Formally an extra-departmental unit (EDU) of the Faculty of Arts and Science, the SRI brings together interdisciplinary researchers across computer science, philosophy, law, political science, economics, psychology, and other fields.

The institute is housed within the Schwartz Reisman Innovation Campus, an innovation hub in Toronto's Discovery District that also houses the Vector Institute for Artificial Intelligence. Its inaugural director and Schwartz Reisman Chair in Technology and Society was Gillian Hadfield, an economist, legal scholar and AI researcher in the Henry N.R. Jackman Faculty of Law.

== Focus areas ==
The institute bridges the gap between AI technology development and human-centred fields. It has two main streams:

1. Research stream: Explores fundamental questions at the intersection of technology and humanity.
2. Solutions stream: Collaborates directly with policymakers, industry leaders, and civil society to translate academic research into actionable policy recommendations, regulatory frameworks, and governance standards.

== People ==
=== Advisory Board ===
- Marian Croak
- Shuman Ghosemajumder
- Geoffrey Hinton
- Alondra Nelson
- Robert Prichard
- Heather Reisman
- Reeta Roy
- Audrey Tang

=== Scientific Advisory Committee ===
- Ryan Calo
- Marian Croak
- David Danks
- Geoffrey Hinton
- Jacob Steinhardt
- Richard S. Sutton
- Shannon Vallor

=== Researchers ===
Notable researchers affiliated with the Schwartz Reisman Institute include:

- Benjamin Alarie – faculty affiliate; professor and legal scholar
- Yoshua Bengio – former advisory board member; professor at the Université de Montréal, founder and scientific director of Mila
- Marsha Chechik – faculty affiliate; professor and computer scientist
- Beth Coleman – research lead; professor and new media academic
- David Duvenaud – Schwartz Reisman Chair in Technology and Society; professor and computer scientist, CIFAR AI chair
- Joshua Gans – faculty affiliate; professor and economist
- Marzyeh Ghassemi – faculty affiliate; professor at MIT
- Seva Gunitsky – faculty affiliate; professor and political scientist
- Gillian Hadfield – former Schwartz Reisman Chair in Technology and Society; professor, economist, legal scholar and AI researcher
- Geoffrey Hinton – strategic advisor; University Professor Emeritus and computer scientist dubbed the "Godfather of AI"
- Steve Joordens – faculty affiliate; professor and psychologist
- Steve Mann – faculty affiliate; professor, engineer and inventor
- James Manyika – former advisory board member; business executive and senior vice-president of Alphabet Inc.
- Rhonda McEwen – faculty affiliate; professor and communication and technology researcher
- Sheila McIlraith – associate director and research lead; professor and computer scientist
- Jennifer Nagel – former research lead; professor and philosopher
- Aleksandar Nikolov – faculty affiliate; professor and theoretical computer scientist
- Kaitlyn Regehr – visiting fellow; professor of digital humanities at University College London
- Thomas Ristenpart – faculty affiliate; professor and computer scientist
- Laura Rosella – faculty affiliate; professor and epidemiologist
- Bruce Schneier – visiting fellow; cryptographer and computer security professional at Harvard University
- Eva Vivalt – faculty affiliate; professor and economist
