= Paul Garfinkel =

Canadian psychiatrist, researcher and academic leader

Paul E. Garfinkel
- Born: Canada
- Occupations: Psychiatrist, academic and researcher
- Awards: Officer of the Order of Canada; Fellow, Royal Society of Canada; John Dewan Award, Ontario Mental Health Foundation; Lifetime Achievement Award, Academy of Eating Disorders; Queen’s Golden Jubilee Award Province of Ontario; Pacesetter Award Canadian Schizophrenia Society; Public Service award, Canadian Mental Health Association; Queen’s Diamond Jubilee Award, Province of Ontario; Doctor of Science Honoris causa University of Manitoba

Academic background
- Education: Bachelor Studies; M.D. F.R.C.P.(C); M.Sc.
- Alma mater: University of Manitoba; University of Toronto

Academic work
- Institutions: University of Toronto

Paul E. Garfinkel is a Canadian psychiatrist, researcher and an academic leader. He is a professor at the University of Toronto and a staff psychiatrist at Centre for Addiction and Mental Health (CAMH).

Garfinkel specializes in eating disorders and has published over 150 scientific papers. He has authored several books, including Anorexia Nervosa: A Multidimensional Perspective, Guidelines for the Use of Psychotropic Drugs and Handbook of Psychotherapy for Anorexia Nervosa and Bulimia.

Garfinkel has held former appointments as psychiatrist in chief, Toronto General Hospital (1982-1990); president and psychiatrist in-chief of Clarke Institute of Psychiatry (1990-1997), and chair of psychiatry at the University of Toronto (1990-2000). In 1998, he was appointed president and CEO of the newly formed Centre for Addiction and Mental Health, a position he held until December 2009. He served on Governing Council for Canadian Institute for Health Research from 2013 to 2017.

Garfinkel is an Officer of the Order of Canada and a Fellow of the Royal Society of Canada.

== Education ==
Garfinkel completed his undergraduate studies and received his medical degree from University of Manitoba in 1969. After completing his residency at the University of Toronto at Toronto General Hospital, Hincks Treatment Centre and Clarke Institute of Psychiatry, Garfinkel obtained his F.R.C.P. in 1974. In 1977, he completed a master's degree from the Institute of Medical Science at University of Toronto.

== Career ==
After receiving his F.R.C.P. qualification, Garfinkel was appointed to the University of Toronto as a demonstrator in the Department of Psychiatry in 1974. In the following year, he was promoted to lecturer, and to assistant professor in 1976. He was promoted to associate professor in 1978 and became a professor of psychiatry in 1982.

Garfinkel has also held several administrative appointments. He was appointed as vice-chair and chair of department of psychiatry at University of Toronto from 1982 till 1990 and from 1990 till 2000, respectively.

Garfinkel held clinical and hospital appointments simultaneously with his academic appointments. At the Clarke Institute of Psychiatry, he was appointed staff physician in 1974. From 1975 till 1979, he served as staff psychiatrist at different units at the Institute. He was appointed as the chief of Psychosomatic Medicine Unit in 1979.. He served as president and psychiatrist-in-chief from 1990 until 1997.

At the Toronto General Hospital, Garfinkel served as an associate psychiatrist from 1978 until 1982 and as psychiatrist-in-chief from 1982 until 1990. He has also served as a consultant at the Addiction Research Foundation, Women's College Hospital, the Wellesley Hospital, the Toronto Hospital and Mount Sinai Hospital. He was appointed as an honorary consultant at St. Michael's Hospital in 1988.

In 1998 Garfinkel was appointed the inaugural president and CEO of the newly formed Centre for Addiction and Mental Health – a merger of four hospitals – the Queen St Mental health Centre, the Addiction Research Foundation, the Donwood Institute and the Clarke institute of Psychiatry – a position he held until the end of 2009. His vision for CAMH resulted in a long-term plan to redesign the organization and its programs, to build an urban village that promoted dignity and respect and fought the stigma directed to the mentally ill and addicted.

=== Research ===
Garfinkel’s research expertise lies in eating disorders. He has conducted extensive research regarding eating disorders, with a special emphasis on Anorexia Nervosa and Bulimia Nervosa. He is responsible for a multi-dimensional understanding of anorexia nervosa that highlights a variety of risk factors. He studied the link between the cultural expectations of thinness in women and development of serious eating disorders and worked on classification and diagnosis of eating disorders. He described criteria for anorexia nervosa, bulimia nervosa and binge eating disorder. He conducted research regarding the clinical similarities and psychological morbidity between men and women with eating disorders and also investigated the relationship between bipolar illness and binge eating disorders.

Garfinkel also conducted research on the Eating Attitudes Test, a measure of the symptoms of anorexia nervosa and related these to psychometric and clinical parameterssociated with it. Other research involved studying the hormonal factors in anorexia nervosa, and the perception of hunger and satiety. Garfinkel discussed body image disturbances in anorexia nervosa and conducted research on Bulimia as a subgroup of Anorexia Nervosa and studied the distinction regarding the two eating disorders. He also studied the personality disorders and co-morbidities in anorexic patients.

His treatment approach became known as Multi-dimensional, aimed at removing the starvation effects of the illness, addressing faulty cognition and then examining the risk factors that brought on the disorder. Medications were used to treat symptoms but were not the primary treatment modality. For the treatment of bulimia, Garfinkel worked with antidepressants, including a trial using isocarboxazid and found that it reduced the level of symptoms associated with the disorder.

Garfinkel had a secondary interest in studying the problems of psychiatrists and conducted research on this.

== Awards and honors ==
- 1974 - Paul Christie Memorial Award, Ontario Mental Health Foundation
- 1976 - McNeil Award
- 1981 - Clarke Institute of Psychiatry Research Award
- 1982 - John Dewan Award, Ontario Mental Health Foundation
- 1983 - Anorexia Nervosa and Associated Disorders Award
- 1987 - Bulimia Anorexia Self Help Award
- 1987 - Canadian Psychiatric Research Foundation Annual Award
- 2000 - Lifetime Achievement Award, Academy of Eating Disorders
- 2002 - Queen’s Gold Jubilee Medal, Province of Ontario
- 2004 - Pacesetter Award, Schizophrenia Society of Canada
- 2008 - Officer, Order of Canada
- 2009 - Public Service award, Canadian Mental health Association
- 2012 - Queen’s Diamond Jubilee Award, province of Ontario
- 2025 - Distinguished Legacy Award, Reach Out Together Foundation

== Bibliography ==
=== Selected books ===
- Anorexia Nervosa: A Multidimensional Perspective (1982) ISBN 978-0876302972
- Guidelines for the Use of Psychotropic Drugs (1984) ISBN 978-9401176200
- Handbook of Psychotherapy for Anorexia Nervosa and Bulimia (1985) ISBN 978-0898626421
- Diagnostic Issues in Anorexia Nervosa and Bulimia Nervosa (1988) ISBN 978-0876305027
- A Life in Psychiatry: Looking Out, Looking In (2014) ISBN 978-0991741175

=== Selected articles ===
- Garner, D.M., Olmsted, M.A., Bohr, Y. and Garfinkel, P.E. The Eating Attitudes Test: Psychometric Features and Clinical Correlates. Psychological Medicine, 12: 871-878, 1982.
- Garner, D.M. and Garfinkel, P.E. The Eating Attitudes Test: An Index of the Symptoms of Anorexia Nervosa. Psychological Medicine, 9: 273-279, 1979.
- Garner, D.M., Garfinkel, P.E., Schwartz, D. and Thompson, M. The Cultural Expectations of Thinness in Women. Psychological Reports, 47: 483-491, 1980.
- Garner, D.M. and Garfinkel, P.E. Socio-Cultural Factors in the Development of Anorexia Nervosa. Psychological Medicine, 9: 647-656, 1980.
- Garfinkel, P.E., Moldofsky, H. and Garner, D.M. The Heterogeneity of Anorexia Nervosa: Bulimia as a Distinct Subgroup. Archives of General Psychiatry, 37: 1036-1040, 1980.
- Garfinkel, P.E., Dorian, B.J. and Sadavoy J.: Boundary Violations and Departments of Psychiatry, Canadian Journal of Psychiatry, 42: 764-770, 1997.
- Garfinkel, P.E. and Dorian, B.D.: Factors that may influence future approaches to the eating disorders, Journal of Eating and Weight Disorders, 2: 1-16, 1997.
- Garfinkel, P.E., Simpson, J. and Baumann, A. : An Amalgamation of Four Specialty Hospitals: Lessons Learned. Hospital Quarterly, Spring, 14-23, 1999.
