= Gelareh Zadeh =

Iranian-Canadian physician

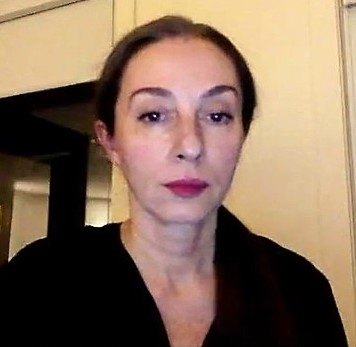
- Born: 1971 (age 54–55); Iran
- Education: University of Manitoba; University of Toronto
- Scientific career
- Workplaces: Ontario Cancer Institute; University of Toronto; Toronto Western Hospital; University College London
- Thesis: Role of angiopoietins and Tie2/TEK in astrocytoma angiogenesis. (2007)

Gelareh Zadeh (born 1971) is an Iranian-Canadian neurosurgeon who is a professor and the Dan Family Chair in the Department of Surgery at the University of Toronto. She is a neurosurgeon-scientist at Toronto Western Hospital at University Health Network. In 2020, Zadeh became the first woman to be elected Chair of the Division of Neurosurgery at the University of Toronto. In 2023, she was one of the two winners of the inaugural Canada Gairdner Momentum Award.

== Early life and education ==
Zadeh was born in Iran. Her father is an economist and her mother is a nuclear chemist. She spent part of her childhood in the United Kingdom whilst her mother studied chemistry. Her family moved back to Iran at the start of the Iranian Revolution. Her mother was awarded a scholarship to return to England, where her family applied to immigrate to Canada. The Zadeh family arrived in Winnipeg in 1988. She completed her undergraduate medical degree at the University of Manitoba. She moved to the University of Toronto for her speciality training, and focused on neurosurgery. Whilst in Toronto, she worked toward a doctorate in medical sciences. Her doctoral research looked at the role of angiopoietins in astrocytoma angiogenesis. After earning her doctorate Zadeh moved to University College London as a UK Cancer Care Ontario Research Fellow. In London, she worked as a neurosurgeon in the UCL Queen Square Institute of Neurology.

== Research and career ==
Zadeh returned to Canada in 2008, and was appointed a Canadian Institutes of Health Research clinician at the Toronto Western Hospital. She leads a brain tumour clinic that focuses on skull base neuro-oncology. She serves as the director of the University Health Network and University of Toronto Brain Tumour Bank. She works with Vera Bril on the University Health Network Elizabeth Raab Neurofibromatosis Program. Zadeh was the first woman to be elected Chair of the Division of Neurosurgery at the University of Toronto in 2020.

Zadeh's research looks to understand the molecular mechanisms that underpin glioma angiogenesis and what regulates tumour metabolism. She has studied how cells derived from bone marrow support glioma vasculature. She has also studied how differentiation into macrophages and altered metabolisms impact response to anti-angiogenic therapy.

In June 2024, Mayo Clinic announced that she had been named the Mayo Clinic Department of Neurosurgery Chair in Rochester, Minnesota starting the fall of that year.

== Academic service ==
Zadeh has served as Scientific Chair of the Society for Neuro-Oncology, Secretary of the Society for Neuro-Oncology and Chair of the World Federation of Neurological Surgeons Neuro-oncology Committee. She was appointed President of the Society of Neuro-Oncology in 2020. She has campaigned to get more women involved with neurosurgery.

== Selected publications ==
- Marcel Kool; David T W Jones; Natalie Jäger; et al. (17 March 2014). "Genome sequencing of SHH medulloblastoma predicts genotype-related response to smoothened inhibition". Cancer Cell. 25 (3): 393–405. doi:10.1016/j.ccr.2014.02.004. ISSN 1535-6108. PMC 4493053. PMID 24651015. Wikidata Q27852966.
- Kenneth Aldape; Gelareh Zadeh; Sheila Mansouri; Guido Reifenberger; Andreas von Deimling (6 May 2015). "Glioblastoma: pathology, molecular mechanisms and markers". Acta Neuropathologica. 129 (6): 829–848. doi:10.1007/s00401-015-1432-1. ISSN 0001-6322. PMID 25943888. Wikidata Q38460865.
- Xiao-Yang Liu; Noha Gerges; Andrey Korshunov; et al. (12 August 2012). "Frequent ATRX mutations and loss of expression in adult diffuse astrocytic tumors carrying IDH1/IDH2 and TP53 mutations". Acta Neuropathologica. 124 (5): 615–625. doi:10.1007/s00401-012-1031-3. ISSN 0001-6322. PMID 22886134. Wikidata Q44269667.

== Personal life ==
Zadeh is married to a physician and has two daughters.
