= Rachel Tyndale =

Canadian pharmacogenomics researcher

- Born: February 9, 1962 (age 64); Montreal, Quebec, Canada

Academic background
- Education: BSc, Queen's University at Kingston; MSc, PhD, 1992, University of Toronto
- Thesis: Genetically polymorphic P450IID1 (sparteine/debrisoquine - type CYP2D6): neuronal characterization and structural variants (1992)

Academic work
- Institutions: University of Toronto; CAMH

Rachel Fynvola Tyndale (born February 9, 1962) is a Canadian pharmacogeneticist. She is a Professor in the Departments of Psychiatry, and Pharmacology and Toxicology at the University of Toronto and a Canada Research Chair in Pharmacogenomics. Tyndale is also the Senior Scientist and Head of Pharmacogenetics in the Campbell Family Mental Health Research Institute at the Centre for Addiction and Mental Health (CAMH).

== Early life and education ==
Tyndale was born on February 9, 1962 to parents Tony and Penny Tyndale in Montreal, Quebec. She completed her Bachelor of Science degree at Queen's University at Kingston before enrolling at the University of Toronto (U of T) for her Master of Science degree and PhD. Following her PhD, Tyndale accepted a postdoctoral fellowship at the University of California, Los Angeles.

== Career ==
Following her fellowship, Tyndale joined the Centre for Addiction and Mental Health (CAMH) and accepted a faculty position at U of T in their Departments of Psychiatry, and Pharmacology and Toxicology in 1996. Upon joining the faculty, she joined a research project which discovered that CYP2A6 was responsible for the oxidation of nicotine to cotinine, as opposed to enzymes. This revelation showed that people who metabolize the drug slowly are less likely to become smokers, because the negative effects of nicotine last longer for them. This led to her co-founding Nicogen Inc. in 1998 which aimed at developing commercial drug therapy for nicotine. As a new professor at U of T, Tyndale received the 2003 Leon I. Goldberg Early Investigator Award and 2005 North American New Investigator Award for her early success.

Throughout her tenure at the institution, Tyndale continued her research into tobacco and conducted the study to demonstrate the direct effect of nicotine on drug metabolism in the central nervous system. She also co-led a randomized clinical trial to determine how long nicotine stays in the body between cigarettes and after users stop smoking. Her research team found that slow metabolizers benefited greatly from nicotine patches while normal metabolizers of nicotine showed more success with varenicline. In 2016, Tyndale was named a Canada Research Chair in Pharmacogenomics to continue her research into investigating genes that can alter drug metabolism and create interindividual differences in drug efficacy, toxicity, and drug dependence. As electronic cigarettes (also known as vaping) grew in prominence, Tyndale was selected to serve on the Canadian scientific advisory board on vaping products in 2018.

In 2020, Tyndale was elected a Fellow of the American Association for the Advancement of Science for "outstanding contributions to understanding of the role of drug metabolism in addiction and in particular, how genetic polymorphisms alter behaviors relevant to nicotine addiction." The following year, she was named the recipient of the 2021 North American Scientific Achievement Award as an International Society for the Study of Xenobiotics (ISSX) member who has made major scientific contributions to the field.
