= Gillian Hadfield =

Canadian legal scholar (born 1961)

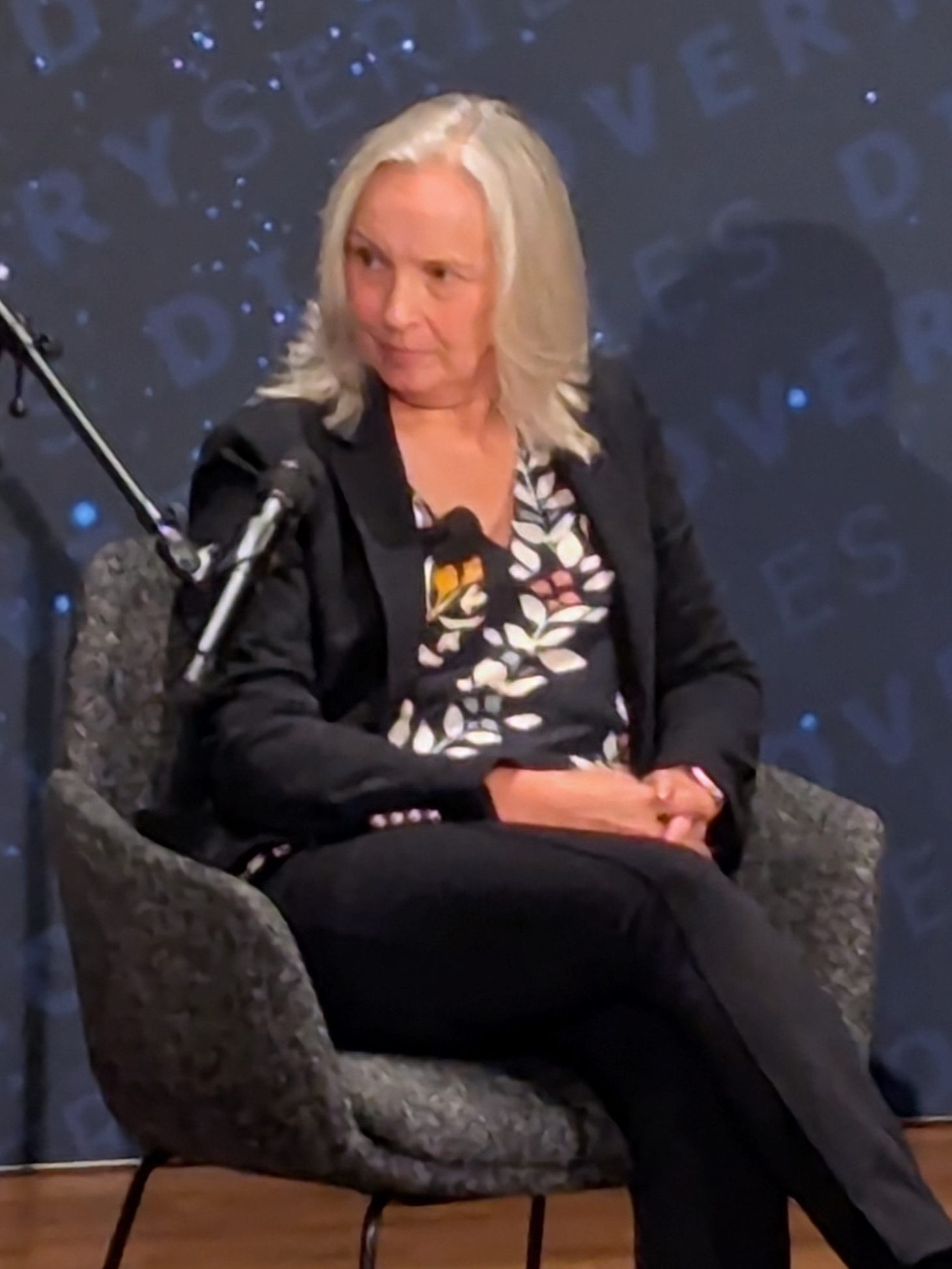
- Hadfield in 2024
- Born: July 14, 1961 (age 65); Toronto, Ontario, Canada
- Children: Dylan Hadfield-Menell; Noah Hadfield-Menell

Academic background
- Education: Queen's University (BA); Stanford University (JD, PhD)
- Thesis: Commitment and the Design of Long-Term Contracts: Applications and Limitations of Contracting (1990)
- Doctoral advisor: Paul Milgrom
- Other advisor: Kenneth Arrow

Gillian Kereldena Hadfield (born July 14, 1961) is a Canadian economist, legal scholar and artificial intelligence researcher who is the Bloomberg Distinguished Professor of AI Alignment and Governance. She is also Professor of Law and of Strategic Management at Toronto, Canada CIFAR AI Chair at the Vector Institute, and an AI2050 Senior Fellow. From 2018 to 2023, Hadfield served as Senior Policy Adviser to the artificial intelligence company OpenAI.

She was previously the director and eponymous chair of the Schwartz Reisman Institute for Technology and Society and professor in the Faculty of Law at the University of Toronto, and the Richard L. and Antoinette Schamoi Kirtland Professor of Law and Professor of Economics at the University of Southern California. At USC, Hadfield directed the Southern California Innovation Project and the USC Center in Law, Economics, and Organization. She is a former member of the board of directors for the American Law and Economics Association and the International Society for New Institutional Economics.

== Education and early career ==
Hadfield received her BA with honours in economics from Queen's University in 1983. She earned a JD with distinction from Stanford Law School in 1988 and a PhD in economics from Stanford University in 1990.

Following law school, Hadfield clerked for Judge Patricia M. Wald of the U.S. Court of Appeals for the District of Columbia Circuit.

== Academic career ==
Hadfield joined the faculty of the UC Berkeley School of Law as an assistant law professor in 1990. From 1994 to 1999, Hadfield was an associate law professor at the University of Toronto Faculty of Law, and then a professor of law from 1999 to 2001. Hadfield also served as a professor with NYU School of Law's Global Law Faculty from 1999 to 2001.

Hadfield moved to the USC Gould School of Law in 2001, where she was appointed the Richard L. and Antoinette Schamoi Kirtland Professor of Law and Professor of Economics at the University of Southern California, serving in the role to 2018.

In 2016, she was the Daniel R. Fischel and Sylvia M. Neil Distinguished visiting professor of Law at the University of Chicago Law School. In 2010, Hadfield was the Sidley Austin Visiting Professor at Harvard Law School, and in 2008, was the Justin W. D'Atri Visiting Professor of Law, Business, and Society at Columbia Law School. In 2006–2007 and 2010–2011, Hadfield served as a fellow of the Center for Advanced Study in the Behavioral Sciences at Stanford University, and in 1993, served as a National Fellow at the Hoover Institution.

In 2018, Hadfield rejoined the University of Toronto and in 2019 was appointed the Schwartz Reisman Chair in Technology and Society, as well as the director of the Schwartz Reisman Institute for Technology and Society.

Hadfield served as Senior Policy Adviser to OpenAI from 2018 to 2023. While at OpenAI, Hadfield proposed "regulatory markets, in which governments require the targets of regulation to purchase regulatory services from a private regulator" as a new form of regulation for the AI industry.

In 2024, Hadfield joined Johns Hopkins University as Bloomberg Distinguished Professor of AI Alignment and Governance holding joint appointments in the School of Government and Policy and the Department of Computer Science in the Whiting School of Engineering. She is currently the Principal Investigator of the Normativity Lab.

== Publications ==
Hadfield's work is widely published in law journals, including the Stanford Law Review, and in peer-reviewed journals, including the Annals of Internal Medicine, the Journal of Comparative Economics, the Journal of Economic Behavior and Organization, and the Annual Review of Law and Social Science.

- Hadfield, Gillian K. (1990). "Problematic Relations: Franchising and the Law of Incomplete Contracts". Stanford Law Review. 42 (4): 927–992. doi:10.2307/1228908. ISSN 0038-9765. JSTOR 1228908.
- The second wave of law and economics. Megan Richardson, Gillian K. Hadfield. Leichhardt, N.S.W.: Federation Press. 1999. ISBN 1-86287-316-X. OCLC 59512709.
- Hadfield, Gillian K. (2008). "Legal Barriers to Innovation: The Growing Economic Cost of Professional Control over Corporate Legal Markets". Stanford Law Review. 60 (6): 1689–1732. ISSN 0038-9765. JSTOR 40040424.
- Hadfield, Gillian K.; Weingast, Barry R. (May 11, 2014). "Microfoundations of the Rule of Law". Annual Review of Political Science. 17 (1): 21–42. doi:10.1146/annurev-polisci-100711-135226. ISSN 1094-2939.
- Hadfield, Gillian K. (2017). Rules for a flat world: why humans invented law and how to reinvent it for a complex global economy. New York, NY. ISBN 978-0-19-991653-5. OCLC 950084369.
- Hadfield-Menell, Dylan; Hadfield, Gillian K. (January 27, 2019). "Incomplete Contracting and AI Alignment". Proceedings of the 2019 AAAI/ACM Conference on AI, Ethics, and Society. ACM. pp. 417–422. arXiv:1804.04268. doi:10.1145/3306618.3314250. ISBN 978-1-4503-6324-2.
- Dafoe, Allan; Bachrach, Yoram; Hadfield, Gillian; Horvitz, Eric; Larson, Kate; Graepel, Thore (2021). "Cooperative AI: machines must learn to find common ground". Nature. 593 (7857): 33–36. Bibcode:2021Natur.593...33D. doi:10.1038/d41586-021-01170-0. PMID 33947992. S2CID 233740521.
- Köster, Raphael; Hadfield-Menell, Dylan; Everett, Richard; Weidinger, Laura; Hadfield, Gillian K.; Leibo, Joel Z. (January 18, 2022). "Spurious normativity enhances learning of compliance and enforcement behavior in artificial agents". Proceedings of the National Academy of Sciences. 119 (3) e2106028118. Bibcode:2022PNAS..11906028K. doi:10.1073/pnas.2106028118. ISSN 0027-8424. PMC 8784148. PMID 35022231.
