= Ryan Calo =

American legal scholar

- Occupations: Professor, legal scholar

Academic background
- Education: Dartmouth College; University of Michigan

Academic work
- Institutions: University of Washington School of Law

Ryan Calo is an American legal scholar, internationally recognized within the fields of emerging technology, especially privacy, robotics, and artificial intelligence. He is a co-founder of three technology and society initiatives at University of Washington, the Tech Policy Lab, the Center for an Informed Public, and Society + Technology at UW. He is on the scientific advisory committee of the Schwartz Reisman Institute for Technology and Society.

== Education and career ==
Calo studied philosophy at Dartmouth College, then moved into a role investigating allegations of police misconduct in New York City. After graduating from law school at University of Michigan, he worked for R. Guy Cole Jr., and on privacy and administrative law in the D.C. office of Covington and Burling, LLC.

At Stanford Law School, he directed privacy and robotics research at the Stanford Center for Internet and Society, and founded the Legal Aspects of Autonomous Driving initiative.

He eventually advanced to faculty member at the University of Washington, where he holds multiple positions. As of 2025, Calo holds the Virginia and Prentice Bloedel Endowed Professorship at the School of Law, previously he held the Lane Powell and D. Wayne Gittinger Endowed Professorship at the School of Law; he is also a professor at the Information School and an adjunct professor at the Paul G. Allen School of Computer Science and Engineering. His work in robotics and cyberlaw was the focus of an article in Science magazine that highlighted the research behind his paper "Robots and the Lessons of Cyberlaw" as well as a report he created for the Brookings Institution.

He is a founding co-director of the UW Tech Policy Lab which began in 2013; is co-founder of the Center for an Informed Public, a collaborative whose mission is to resist strategic misinformation, promote an informed society, and strengthen democratic discourse, and is a faculty lead and co-founder of Society + Technology at UW, a cross-campus, cross-disciplinary effort on the social, societal, and justice aspects of technology, which launched in 2025.

Calo chaired a University-wide task force on technology and society from fall 2021 to June 2022, and served as chair for the We Robot Conference 2022 when it was hosted by the University of Washington.

Calo was appointed at the World Bank to review privacy appeals and has testified before the United States Senate four times.

== Publications ==
- "Artificial Intelligence and the Carousel of Soft Law," IEEE Transactions on Technology and Society (2021)
- "The Automated Administrative State: A Crisis of Legitimacy," Emory Law Journal (2021)
