= Marian Croak =

American engineer and inventor

Dr. Marian Croak
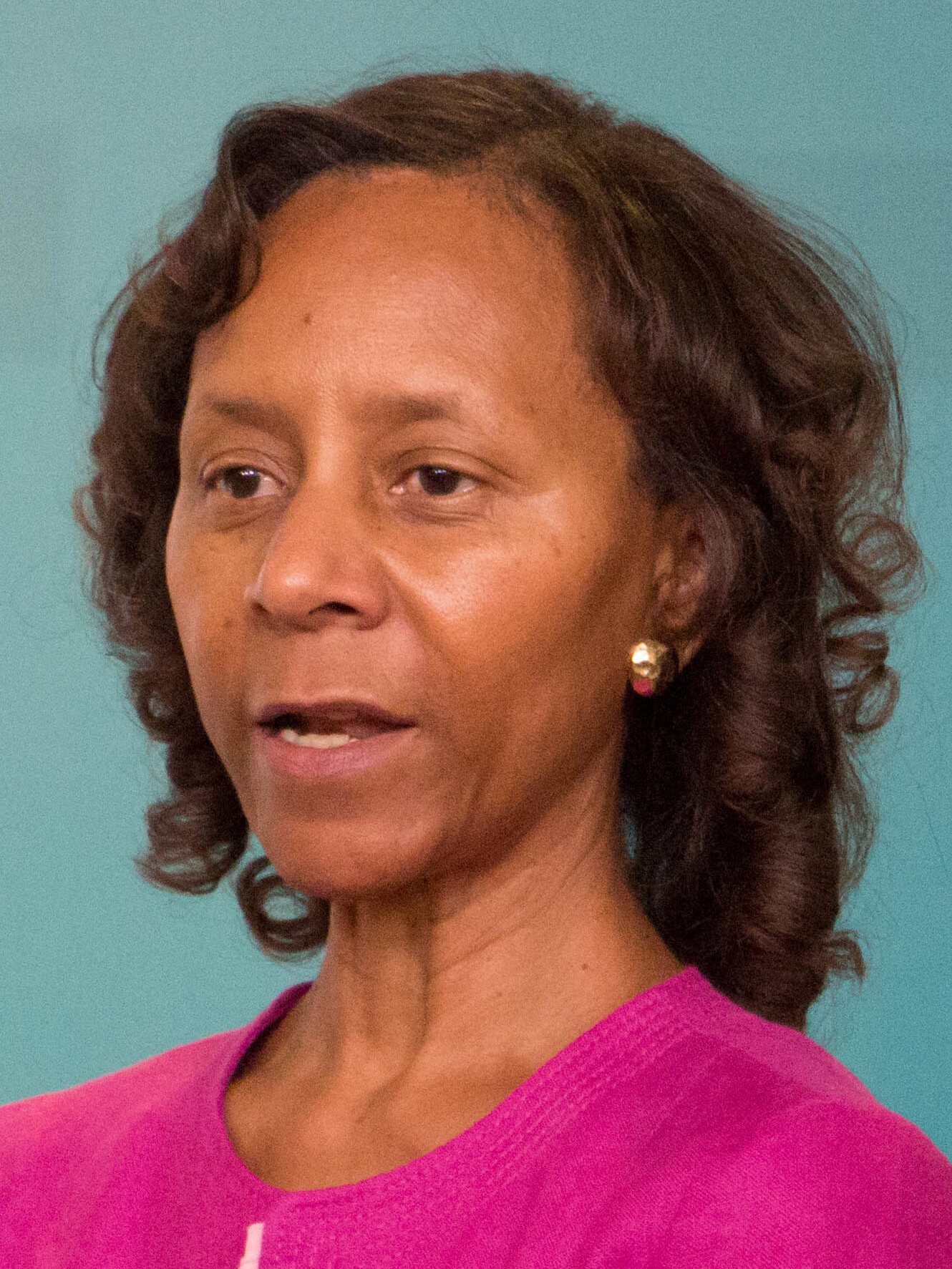
- Croak in 2017
- Born: May 14, 1955 (age 71); New York, New York, U.S.
- Education: Princeton University (BA); University of Southern California (PhD)
- Employer(s): Google; AT&T; Bell Labs
- Known for: Voice over IP
- Awards: National Inventors Hall of Fame; National Academy of Engineering; 2026 IEEE Founders Medal

Marian Rogers Croak (born May 14, 1955) is an American engineer known for her voice over IP (VoIP) related inventions. Croak worked for three decades at Bell Labs and AT&T where she filed over 200 patents, and has worked at Google since 2014 as Vice President of Engineering. In 2022, she was inducted into the National Inventors Hall of Fame for her work with VoIP. She is on the advisory board of the Schwartz Reisman Institute for Technology and Society.

== Early life and education ==
Born May 14, 1955, Croak was raised in New York City. She credits her lifelong interest in technology to her father. Though he had only an elementary school education, he built her a chemistry set that led to her early exploration of the sciences. Croak grew up entranced by the inner workings of plumbing, electricity, and other home-related maintenance. Her career is defined by the desire to fix broken systems, just like the technicians she viewed as a child. She attended Princeton University, where she earned her undergraduate degree in 1977 and received a PhD from the University of Southern California in Social Psychology and Quantitative Analysis. Her education pointed her toward Bell Labs where she worked for three decades.

== Career ==
Croak started off in Bell Labs' Human Factors division, with the specific purpose of studying how technology could be used to positively impact people's lives. Croak first began working on digital messaging applications, tasked with determining whether various messaging applications could communicate with each other. This kind of research was very novel, as the earliest form of the Internet would not be widely deployed until 1983. Bell Labs wanted to send voice, text, and video data digitally rather than using a standard phone line. The favored mechanism for this was Asynchronous Transfer Mode (ATM) protocol, but Croak, along with the rest of her team, convinced AT&T to use TCP/IP instead. TCP/IP allowed for a standardized way of packaging and communicating information.

While at AT&T, Croak and her team contemplated the potential of digital telecommunications. She worked on advancing Voice over Internet Protocol (VoIP) technologies, converting voice data into digital signals that can be easily transmitted over the internet rather than using traditional phone lines. Her work has furthered the capabilities of audio and video conferencing.

At AT&T she patented the technology that allowed cellphone users to donate money to organizations using text messaging. She developed this technology during the aftermath of Hurricane Katrina, and it revolutionized how people donate to charitable organizations when a natural disaster occurs. She was inspired to do this after seeing AT&T develop technology that helped American Idol set up a voting system that relied on text messages rather than voice calls in 2003. The technology that she created with co-inventor Hossein Eslambolchi was not finalized until October 2005, a couple of months after Hurricane Katrina. She received the 2013 Thomas Edison Patent Award for this technology. But through this technology after the 2010 Haiti earthquake, more than $43 million in donations were collected by relief organizations through donations by text message.

At AT&T she managed over 2,000 engineers and computer scientists responsible for over 500 programs impacting AT&T's enterprise and consumer wireline and mobility services. Her responsibilities ranged from product realization and service planning to development and testing. Before leaving AT&T she held the title of Senior Vice President of Applications and Services Infrastructure.

In 2014 she joined Google as a vice president in the engineering group. At Google, she is responsible for expanding what the Internet is capable of doing around the world and increasing access to the Internet in the developing World. She created a new center of expertise on Responsible AI focusing on ethical development of AI within Google Research, and now works on Human Centered AI. Croak also works on encouraging women, young girls, and underserved communities in engineering.

In 2016, Croak was inducted into the Women in Technology International Hall of Fame. Croak was also inducted into the National Inventors Hall of Fame (NIHF), the National Academy of Engineering, and the American Academy of Arts and Sciences in 2022. Because of this, she became one of the first two Black women to be inducted to the NIHF, joining the ranks of 48 other female inductees and 30 other Black inductees.

== Patents ==
Croak has been awarded over 200 patents, almost half of which are in VoIP. Many of her inventions lay the foundations for the digital networks we know and use today. She was inducted into the National Inventors Hall of Fame in 2022 for her patent VoIP Technology U.S. Patent No. 7,599,359 Method and apparatus for monitoring end-to-end performance in a network. Today, the widespread use of VoIP technology is vital for remote work and conferencing, as well as personal communications.

She received a patent in 2005 for text-based donations to charity, along with co-inventor Hossein Eslambolchi, U.S. Patent 7,715,368 Method and Apparatus for dynamically debiting a donation. This technology enables a network to identify a particular charity, provide the designating funding to the charity, and then have the network service provider bill the original donor on its monthly bill.

== Personal life ==
Croak won the Edison Patent Awards in 2013 and 2014. She is currently a member of the Corporate Advisory Board for the Viterbi School of Engineering at her alma mater, the University of Southern California. Croak is also a former board member for such organizations as the Alliance for Telecommunications Industry Solutions; Catalyst; the Holocaust and Human Rights Museum (New Jersey); and the National Action Council for Minorities in Engineering. She has three children.
