= Gordon Bell (physician) =

Canadian physician (1911–2005)

- Born: Robert Gordon Bell; July 11, 1911; St. Marys, Ontario, Canada
- Died: June 15, 2005 (aged 93)
- Occupation: Physician
- Known for: Founder of Donwood Institute, pioneer in addiction treatment.
- Spouse: Mary Irene Lamping (m. 1938)

Robert Gordon Bell (July 11, 1911 – June 15, 2005), was a Canadian medical doctor and pioneer in the field of addiction treatment. He founded the Donwood Institute, North America's first public hospital for addiction treatment, in 1967. During his lifetime, he was considered Canada's foremost authority on the treatment of drug and alcohol addiction.

== Early years and career ==
He was born in St. Marys, Ontario, where he was raised in a farming community. After graduating from the University of Toronto's med school, he joined the Royal Canadian Army Medical Corps and treated victims of shell shock/posttraumatic stress disorder.

In 1946, he opened his first treatment centre, Glenmaple; based out of his home. Glenmaple could operate without a hospital license due to an old statute which allowed doctors to take up to four patients into their home for treatment. Though aimed at all people in need of mental health services, all of his patients were alcoholics. The treatment was so popular that Bell soon had to increase capacity, and Glenmaple closed in 1947 as Shadow Brook opened in 1948.

== Early career and treatment centres ==
The Shadow Brook Health Foundation, a 25-bed male only treatment, opened in 1948. In 1949, Bell sponsored the arrival of the drug Antabuse in Canada. He used Antabuse to treat patients while working on the development of the drug Temposil, an anti-drinking drug with less severe side effects. He served as the chairman for the Committee on Problem Drinking (now known as the American Occupational Medical Association) from 1951 to 1958, where he worked to change the negative attitude the medical community held toward alcoholic employees. In 1951, he also opened Willowdale Hospital for Women to treat female patients.

He was asked to consult on the planning of the Alex G. Brown Clinic for reformatory patients, where he developed the clinic's treatment and rehabilitation program. He became co-chairman of the clinic in 1953; his program for clinic eventually was adopted by the Ontario Correctional Institute. Simultaneously, Bell developed the "alco-dial" with the help of Ken Ferguson; the alco-dial was an early device used by police to read breathalyzer tests and measure blood alcohol levels based on averages. His work was instrumental in establishing 0.08 as the baseline acceptable blood alcohol content limit.

In 1954, he closed Shadow Brook and combined it with Willowdale to become the renamed Bell Clinic.

== Donwood Institute ==
In 1967, Bell established the Donwood Institute, the first public hospital for the treatment of addictions. Along with the Clarke Institute of Psychiatry, the Addiction Research Foundation and the Queen Street Mental Health Centre, the Donwood Institute formed the Centre for Addiction and Mental Health.

== Bellwood ==
Bell founded the private clinic Bellwood Health Services in 1982. It was involved in several Canadian landmarks in the treatment of addiction, including the provision of the first in-patient cocaine treatment program and first residential treatment program for sexual addiction in Canada. The clinic has contracts to provide service to northern Canada and the Canadian Armed Forces. In 2014, Bellwood Health Services was acquired by the Edgewood Health Network.

== Awards and remembrances ==
Bell received several prominent awards over his lifetime. They include:

- Primary fellowship of Royal College of Physicians and Surgeons of Canada
- Appointed as Officer of the Order of Canada in 1982.
- Recipient of the Royal Bank Award and Gold Medal in 1985
- Gordon Bell Road in Toronto, Ontario.
