= Elizabeth Cowper =

Canadian linguist

- Born: 1952 (age 73–74)
- Education: Brown University (PhD)
- Occupations: Linguist; professor

Elizabeth Cowper (born 1952) is professor emeritus of linguistics at the University of Toronto.

== Career ==
She received her PhD from Brown University in 1976. She then took up a position at the University of Toronto, where she remained until she retired from teaching and administration in June 2014. A Workshop on Contrast in Syntax was organized in her honor upon her retirement.

Her work specializes in the interface between syntax and semantics, and has worked on the interpretable features of both the nominal and the clausal domains. She has written about the features of tense and aspect in English and Spanish, arguing that the tense and aspect features are arranged in a hierarchical feature geometry (Cowper 2005a). She has also claimed, in Cowper (2005b) that plural number is more marked than dual number, in other words that plural can be more complex than dual.

She is the author of A Concise Introduction to Syntactic Theory: The Government-Binding Approach (Cowper 1992), which is still in print, and which has been translated into Korean.

She has also been active in academic administration. From 1999 to 2005 she was chair of the department of humanities at the University of Toronto Scarborough, and from 2005 to 2009 she was vice-dean (programs) at the school of graduate studies, University of Toronto, among many other positions.

== Honors ==
In 2014, Cowper was awarded the Vivek Goel Faculty Citizenship Award.

From 2016 to 2019, she was the editor of the Canadian Journal of Linguistics.

== Selected publications ==
Cowper, Elizabeth. 2005a. The Geometry of Interpretable Features: INFL in English and Spanish. Language 81, 10–46. doi:10.1353/lan.2005.0012

Cowper, Elizabeth. 2005b. A note on number. Linguistic Inquiry 36, 441–455. doi:10.1162/0024389054396935

Cowper, Elizabeth. 1992. A Concise Introduction to Syntactic Theory. University of Chicago Press. ISBN 978-0-226-11646-4
