= Julia Ching =

Canadian religious studies academic

Julia Ching, CM RSC (Chinese: 秦家懿; pinyin: Qín Jiāyì) (1934 – October 26, 2001) was professor of religion, philosophy and East Asian studies at the University of Toronto.

== Biography ==
Born in Shanghai in 1934, Ching fled the Republic of China as a refugee during World War II. After completing high school at Sacred Heart Canossian College in Hong Kong, Ching studied at the College of New Rochelle in New York and then served as an Ursuline nun for two decades, completing a master's degree at the Catholic University of America in Washington, DC, before obtaining a doctorate in Asian studies at the Australian National University in Canberra. She taught at Columbia and Yale before joining the University of Toronto faculty in 1978. Her younger brother is Frank Ching, (Chinese: 秦家骢; pinyin: Qín Jiācōng), a journalist for The New York Times, The Wall Street Journal, and the South China Morning Post.

Ching rose to prominence as a world expert on the neo-Confucianism and religion of the Song and Ming dynasties of 10th- through 17th-century China. She wrote or edited 15 books including her definitive studies of the leading Ming Confucian, Wang Yangming, and the leading Song Confucian, Zhu Xi. In 2000, she was named a member of the Order of Canada.

For her scholarly achievement, Ching was named incumbent of the R.C. and E.Y. Lee Chair of Chinese Thought and Culture, elected a fellow of the Royal Society of Canada, and named to the Scholars' Council of the U.S. Library of Congress. In 1994 she was named University Professor, the highest honour the university accords its faculty. Along with her colleague and husband, professor emeritus Willard Oxtoby of religion and South Asian studies, Ching was co-president and chief organizer of an international congress in Asian studies that brought over 1,000 scholars to the University of Toronto in 1990.

== Personal life ==
Formerly private about her personal life, Ching shared many of her fears and sentiments in a personal literary memoir, The Butterfly Healing: A Life Between East and West (1998). In it she described her perceptions of being an Asian woman in male-dominated Western academia, of striving for spiritual discipline in the religious orders and of seeking healing and meaning in life as a three-time cancer survivor.

Ching's interests were not limited to scholarship. She participated in movements for world responsibility such as the Inter-Action Council, Science for Peace, and the Canadian Pugwash. She was also a busy commentator, frequently called on to interpret breaking news from China for the Canadian news media. In response to the Tiananmen Square protests of 1989, she published Probing China's Soul (1990), a book on protest and dissent in China.

She and her husband Willard Oxtoby adopted a Chinese son.

On October 26, 2001, she died at her Toronto home after a long battle with cancer.

== Works ==
- Julia Ching. "'Authentic Selfhood': Wang Yang-Ming and Heidegger". The Monist, Volume 61, Issue 1, 1 January 1978, Pages 3–27.
- Julia Ching. Confucianism and Christianity: A Comparative Study. New York: Kodansha International. 1978. xxvi+234 pp. ISBN 0-87011-303-8.
- Hans Küng and Julia Ching. Christianity and Chinese Religions. New York: Doubleday, 1989. 309 pp.
- Julia Ching. Probing China's Soul: Religion, Politics, and Protest in the People's Republic. San Francisco: Harper and Row, 1990. 269 pp.
- Julia Ching. The Philosophical Letters of Wang Yang-ming. Canberra, Australia: Australian National University Press, 1972. 142pp. ISBN 0872492656
