= Lydian Collective =

British jazz fusion band

Lydian Collective is a British jazz fusion band based in London. It started performing in 2013 and consists of Aaron ('Laszlo') Wheeler (keyboards), Todd Baker (guitar), Ida Hollis (bass), and Sophie Alloway (drums). Wheeler and Baker are the band composers. The name of the band is derived from the Lydian mode, a favourite scale of Wheeler.

Baker and Wheeler knew each other since the age of 16; they both grew up in Worcestershire. Hollis and Alloway are from London. In 2013, Baker and Wheeler, who both had a successful career as commercial composers, decided to start the band, and invited Alloway, who by that time already was a popular session drummer, and Hollis. In 2017, Baker composed the whole soundtrack of Monument Valley 2. Alloway at some point toured for two years with Roots Manuva.

On 30 March 2018 they released the first album, Adventure, which Peter Jones writing for UK Jazz News described as "a hybrid of Zero 7 and Peter Gabriel-era Genesis" without the vocal. In October 2022 they released Return.

== Discography ==
- Adventure (2018)
- Return (2022)
