= George Michael Wickens =

George Michael Wickens (August 7, 1918 – January 26, 2006) was a distinguished Canadian-British Persianist as well as Arabist, translator and a University lecturer.

Wickens was born in London, England and attended Trinity College, Cambridge, where he received his BA in 1939 and MA in 1946, respectively. During the Second World War, he served with the Royal Army Pay Corp from 1939 to 1941 and the Intelligence Corps from 1941 to 1946, rising to the rank of captain. Following his wartime service — most of which was spent in Iran — Wickens resumed academic life, teaching at the University of London for three years before accepting an invitation to return to Cambridge. He taught there until 1957 when he was offered an associate professorship at University of Toronto. He became a full professor in 1960 and founding chair of the Department of Islamic Studies (predecessor to today’s Department of Near and Middle Eastern Civilizations) in 1961.

He was instrumental not only in the founding of an Iranian Studies and Islamic studies department in University of Toronto, but in establishing it within a decade as a major centre in North America.

A prolific and distinguished humanities scholar, Wickens was the author of Avicenna: Scientist and Philosopher (1952). Wickens was fluent in Persian and Arabic and was one of the pioneering figures of Persian literature in Canada. He translated several masterpieces of Persian literature as Boostan of Sa'di into English.

Wickens died in Toronto, Ontario in 2006 from a stroke.

== See also ==
- Persian culture
- Iranian Studies
