= John Oxtoby =

English evangelist (1767–1830)

John Oxtoby (nicknamed "Praying Johnny") (1767–1830) was an English evangelist and Primitive Methodist preacher.

== Life ==
The Primitive Methodist movement strove to return to the Christianity as taught and practiced by John Wesley. Sixteen years after Wesley's death, the English Methodist Conference found itself divided. A group of zealous ministers were eventually expelled from the Conference for holding camp meetings and open-air services. The Primitive Methodists thought that, like the Wesley brothers, they followed the pillar of fire, rather than rational tradition, and favoured prayer.

Chief among the Primitive Methodists' praying men was John Oxtoby, affectionately known as "Praying Johnny". Praying Johnny was not known for his culture or great intellect, he possessed neither. What he possessed was the faith that moves mountains. He was of average height, sharp features, light brown hair and brown eyes. His speech and words were not considered eloquent to the ears of men, yet they were always sweet to the Father's ear. "Six hours each day he usually spent on his knees, pleading with God, in behalf of himself, the Church and sinners." The Primitive Methodists loved to preach, pray, sing and shout. John Oxtoby was certainly no exception to this rule. "When travailing in anguish for a revival in the neighborhood in which he was laboring and when deeply anxious to see the glory of the Lord revealed, he spent many hours in secluded retirement; and has sometimes in this manner devoted whole days and nights to God."
