= Acta Neuropathologica =

- Discipline: Neuropathology, Clinical Neurology, Pathology, Neurosciences
- Language: English
- Edited by: Johannes Attems

Publication details
- History: 1961–present
- Publisher: Springer Science+Business Media
- Frequency: Monthly
- Impact factor: 9.3 (2024) (2022)

Standard abbreviations
- ISO 4: Acta Neuropathol.

Indexing
- CODEN: ANLSBX
- ISSN: 0001-6322 (print); 1432-0533 (web)
- LCCN: sf78000750
- OCLC no.: 610316690

Links
- Journal homepage; Online archive

Acta Neuropathologica is a monthly peer-reviewed scientific journal covering all aspects of neuropathology published by Springer Science+Business Media. It was established in 1961 and the editor-in-chief is Johannes Attems (Newcastle University).

== Abstracting and indexing ==
The journal is abstracted and indexed in:

- Science Citation Index
- PubMed/MEDLINE
- Scopus
- PsycINFO
- EMBASE
- Chemical Abstracts Service
- EBSCO databases
- CAB International
- Abstracts in Anthropology
- Academic OneFile
- Academic Search
- Biological Abstracts
- BIOSIS
- CSA Environmental Sciences
- Current Contents/Life Sciences
- Elsevier Biobase
- Global Health
- INIS Atomindex
- International Bibliography of Book Reviews
- International Bibliography of Periodical Literature

According to the Journal Citation Reports, the journal has a 2020 impact factor of 17.088.
