= Robert Johnson (historian) =

Robert Johnson is a professor and chair at the University of Toronto.

== Biography ==
Robert Johnson received his Ph.D. from Cornell University.

=== Career ===
Robert Johnson teaches Russian history. His research concentrates on the social and economic aspects of Imperial Russia and the Soviet Union.

From 1993 through 2001 he served as principal investigator of the Stalin Era Research and Archives Project, which received major funding from the Social Sciences and Humanities Research Council of Canada. His own focus within that collaborative project was on population of the USSR in the 1920s and 1930s. He has written on labour and labour unrest, peasant family life, and other social and economic issues, as well as quantitative research methods. He is a frequent commentator for the Canadian news media on current events in Russia and the former Soviet Union. From 1989 to 2001 he served as director of the Centre for Russian and East European Studies at the University of Toronto.

== Published works ==
- Peasant and Proletarian: Moscow’s Working Class at the End of the Nineteenth Century (1979)
- The Seam Allowance: Industrial Homework in Canada's Garment Industry, co-author (1982)
- "A Half-Century of Silence: The 1937 Census of USSR", editor, Russian Studies in History, Summer 1992
