= Centre for Addiction and Mental Health (College Street site) =

- Centre for Addiction and Mental Health
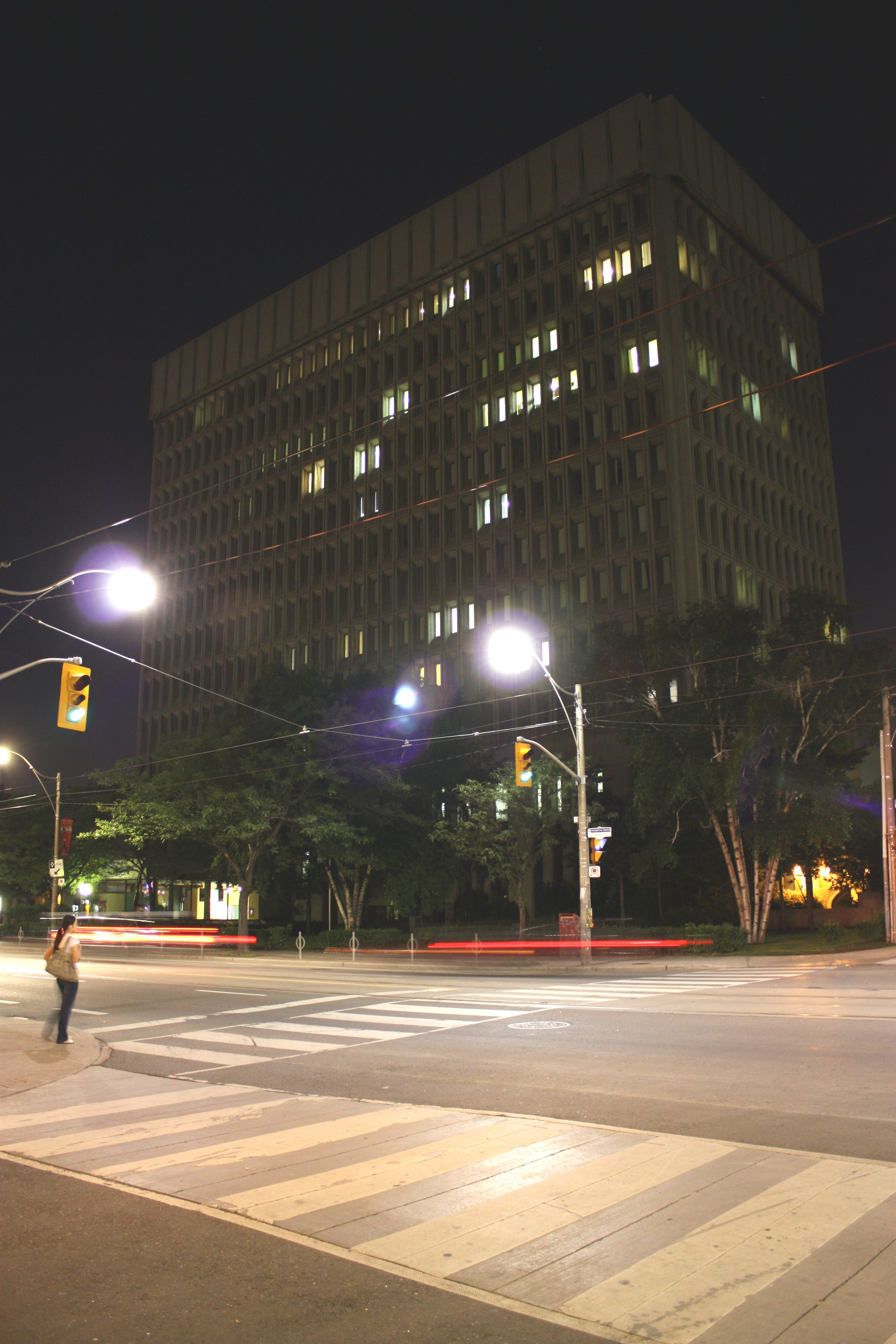
- CAMH building on College Street

Geography
- Location: 250 College Street, Toronto, Ontario, Canada
- Coordinates: 43.658°N 79.399°W

Organization
- Care system: Public Medicare (Canada) (OHIP)
- Type: Specialist
- Affiliated university: University of Toronto

Services
- Emergency department: Yes
- Speciality: Psychiatry

History
- Founded: 1966 (as the Clarke Institute of Psychiatry)

Links
- Website: www.camh.ca
- Lists: Hospitals in Canada

The Centre for Addiction and Mental Health (College Street site) is a psychiatric hospital in Toronto, Ontario. It is located at 250 College Street, just east of Spadina Avenue. Much of its work focuses on forensic psychology, sex addiction, drug addiction, and research designed to shape public policy.

The hospital was originally founded in 1966 as the Clarke Institute of Psychiatry, after Charles Kirk Clarke, a pioneer in mental health in Canada. In 1998, it merged with several other Ontario institutions to form the Centre for Addiction and Mental Health (CAMH), and the facility is now called the CAMH College Street site.

Until 2020 when the department was moved to the Queen Street Site, CAMH's College Street and Spadina Avenue location was the only 24-hour emergency psychiatric care facility in Ontario.
