= Mary Louise Northway =

Canadian psychologist (1909–1987)

Mary L. Northway
- Born: May 28, 1909; Toronto, Ontario, Canada
- Died: February 27, 1987 (aged 77); Toronto, Ontario, Canada

Academic background
- Education: University of Toronto
- Thesis: Bartlett's concept, "schemata". (1938)

Academic work
- Discipline: Psychology
- Sub-discipline: Developmental psychology Social psychology
- Institutions: University of Toronto

Mary Louise Northway (May 28, 1909 – February 27, 1987) was a Canadian psychologist, recognized for her work in the area of sociometry (the measurement of social relationships). She was a faculty member at the University of Toronto.

== Biography ==
Northway was born in Toronto on May 28, 1909; she was the only child of Lucy Northway (née MacKellar) and Arthur Garfield Northway. She was educated in Toronto at Branksome Hall, Rosedale Public School, and Bishop Strachan School.

Northway obtained her B.A. in psychology in 1933 and her M.A. in psychology in 1934, both from the University of Toronto. In 1935–1936, she travelled to Cambridge, England, to study under psychologist Frederic Bartlett. Northway earned her PhD from the University of Toronto in 1938, with a dissertation titled Bartlett's Concept of the Schema. This work was published in the British Journal of Psychology in 1940.

Northway was a faculty member in the psychology department at the University of Toronto from 1933 to 1963. She was also a lecturer, and later Supervisor of Research, at the university's Institute of Child Study (ICS), from 1938 until her retirement in 1968. Northway attributed her resignation to the university's funding cutbacks to educational, search, and research programs at the ICS.

In 1969, Northway co-founded the Brora Centre, a non-profit organization that conducted child development research that was no longer supported by the university. The centre operated until 1978. Northway was awarded an honorary degree from Trent University in 1979.

Northway died in Toronto on February 27, 1987, of pancreatic cancer.

== Research ==
Northway was a pioneering researcher in the field of sociometry, examining children's social groups. She coordinated a multi-decade longitudinal sociometric study at the Institute of Child Study. Northway examined the forms and functions of children's social groups, and how these factors were related to individual behaviour. She also published on sociometric methodology, including methods for visually depicting social relationships.

During her career, Northway also published on a range of developmental psychology topics, including adolescent development, parent-child relationships, and She was also interested in summer camp as a context for the healthy development of children, and edited a guide for camp counsellors.

== Selected works ==
- Northway, Mary L. (1936). "The Influence of Age and Social Group on Children's Remembering". British Journal of Psychology. General Section. 27: 11–29. doi:10.1111/j.2044-8295.1936.tb00813.x.
- Northway, Mary L. (1940). "A Method for Depicting Social Relationships Obtained by Sociometric Testing". Sociometry. 3 (2): 144–150. doi:10.2307/2785439. JSTOR 2785439.
- Northway, Mary L. (1944). "Outsiders: A Study of the Personality Patterns of Children Least Acceptable to Their Age Mates". Sociometry. 7 (1): 10–25. doi:10.2307/2785534. JSTOR 2785534.
- Northway, Mary L. (1946). "Sociometry and Some Challenging Problems of Social Relationships". Sociometry. 9 (2/3): 187–198. doi:10.2307/2785004. JSTOR 2785004.
- Northway, Mary L.; Wigdor, Blossom T. (1947). "Rorschach Patterns Related to the Sociometric Status of School Children". Sociometry. 10 (2): 186. doi:10.2307/2785335. JSTOR 2785335.
- Northway, Mary L.; Rooks, Margaret Mccallum; Moreno, J. L. (1955). "Creativity and Sociometric Status in Children". Sociometry. 18 (4): 194. doi:10.2307/2785854. JSTOR 2785854.
- Northway, Mary L. (1968). "The Stability of Young Children's Social Relations". Educational Research. 11: 54–57. doi:10.1080/0013188680110109.
