= Blossom Wigdor =

Canadian psychologist and gerontologist (1924–2025)

Blossom Wigdor CM
- Born: Blossom Temkin; June 13, 1924; Montreal, Quebec, Canada
- Died: October 25, 2025 (aged 101); Toronto, Ontario, Canada
- Known for: The Over-Forty Society: Issues for Canada's Aging Population (1988)

Academic background
- Education: McGill University; University of Toronto

Academic work
- Discipline: Clinical psychology, gerontology
- Institutions: McGill University; University of Toronto

Blossom Wigdor, CM (June 13, 1924 – October 25, 2025) was a Canadian clinical psychologist and gerontologist. She was a professor emerita at the University of Toronto. Wigdor was the director of the University of Toronto's gerontology program, the first of its kind in Canada. She founded the Canadian Association of Gerontology and was the first editor of the Canadian Journal of Aging. Wigdor was known for her efforts to raise awareness around discrimination against older employees and candidates in the workplace and the job market. She was named a member of the Order of Canada in November 1988.

== Life and career ==
Wigdor (née Temkin) was born in Montreal, Quebec on June 13, 1924. Her parents were Russian Jewish immigrants. She earned an undergraduate degree from McGill University in 1941.

She married engineer Leon Wigdor in 1945 and moved to Toronto. She completed a master's degree in psychology from the University of Toronto, under the supervision of Mary Louise Northway.

Wigdor worked as a clinical psychologist in Toronto's Sunnybrook Hospital in the 1940s, then at Montreal's Queen Mary Veterans' Hospital.

She returned to Montreal to in 1947 and began her PhD at McGill in 1949. After earning her PhD in clinical psychology in 1952, she taught at the university for another 27 years. She continued her clinical work during this time, and was named chief psychologist of Queen Mary Veterans' Hospital in 1961.

At McGill, Wigdor developed an interest and specialization in gerontology. At the suggestion of collaborator Donald O. Hebb, she studied the cognitive development (including intelligence and memory) of older adults.

Wigdor joined the University of Toronto in 1979 and became the founding director of its gerontology program, the first at a Canadian university.

In 1989, Wigdor's book, The Over-Forty Society: Issues for Canada's Aging Population (co-written with economist David Foot), was published. The book examined the impacts of an aging population on Canadian society.

In 1990, Wigdor was named chair of Canada's National Advisory Council on Aging. The same year, she oversaw the official opening of the Centre for Studies of Aging at the University of Toronto, of which she was its director from 1989 to 1991.

Wigdor retired in the 1990s and became a professor emerita at the University of Toronto.

Her husband, Leon, died in 1991. Wigdor remarried in 2002. She died in Toronto on October 25, 2025, at the age of 101.

== Bibliography ==
=== Books ===
- Wigdor, B. T. (1985). Planning Your Retirement: The Complete Canadian Self-help Guide. Grosvenor House. ISBN 9780919959187
- Wigdor, B. T., & Foot, D. K. (1988). The over-forty society: Issues for Canada's aging population. James Lorimer & Company. ISBN 9781550280852

=== Selected publications ===
==== In English ====
- Wigdor, B. T. (1952). an Approach to Personality Through the Investigation of Perceptual Behaviour.
- Wigdor, B. T., & Morris, G. (1977). A Comparison of Twenty-year Medical Histories of Individuals With Depressive and Paranoid States a Preliminary Note. Journal of Gerontology, 32(2), 160-163.
- Wigdor, B. T. (1991). Elder abuse: Major issues from a national perspective (Vol. 2). Conseil consultatif national sur le troisième âge.
- Wigdor, B. T. (1992). Seniors' independence: Whose responsibility?. National Advisory Council on Aging.
- McDonald, L., & Wigdor, B. (1995). Taking stock: elder abuse research in Canada. Canadian Journal on Aging/La Revue canadienne du vieillissement, 14(S2), 1-6.

==== In French ====
- Wigdor, B. T. (1991). Éditorial: Quelques réflexions critiques en lien avec la santé mentale des personnes âgées et l'usage des médicaments. Canadian Journal on Aging/La Revue canadienne du vieillissement, 10(4), 300-304.

== Awards and honours ==
For her contributions as "a pioneer in the field of gerontology", Wigdor was named a member of the Order of Canada in November 1988. She was awarded honorary degrees from the University of Victoria in 1990 and from the University of Guelph in 1994.
