= Lab on a Chip (journal) =

- Discipline: Miniaturisation
- Language: English
- Edited by: Aaron Wheeler

Publication details
- History: 2001–present
- Publisher: Royal Society of Chemistry (United Kingdom)
- Frequency: Biweekly
- Impact factor: 6.1 (2023)

Standard abbreviations
- ISO 4: Lab Chip

Indexing
- CODEN: LCAHAM
- ISSN: 1473-0197 (print); 1473-0189 (web)
- LCCN: 2001257026
- OCLC no.: 48200889

Links
- Journal homepage

Lab on a Chip is a peer-reviewed scientific journal which publishes original (primary) research and review articles on any aspect of miniaturisation at the micro and nano scale. Lab on a Chip is published twice monthly by the Royal Society of Chemistry (RSC) and the editor-in-chief is Aaron Wheeler (University of Toronto). The journal was established in 2001 and hosts other RSC publications: Highlights in Chemical Technology and Highlights in Chemical Biology. According to the Journal Citation Reports, the journal has a 2023 impact factor of 6.1.

== Subject coverage ==
Lab on a Chip publishes research at the micro- and nano-scale across a variety of disciplines including chemistry, biology, bioengineering, physics, electronics, clinical science, chemical engineering, and materials science focusing on lab on a chip technologies.

== Article types ==
Lab on a Chip publishes full research papers, urgent communications, critical and tutorial reviews.

== Chips & Tips ==
Chips & Tips is an online resource launched in 2006. It is moderated by David Beebe (University of Wisconsin–Madison) and Glenn Walker (North Carolina State University and University of North Carolina at Chapel Hill). Chips & Tips pages are brief practical tips for the miniaturisation community, including pictures, videos, and schematics.

== See also ==
- List of chemistry journals
- List of scientific journals
