= Aaron Wheeler House =

Historic house in Massachusetts, United States

- U.S. National Register of Historic Places
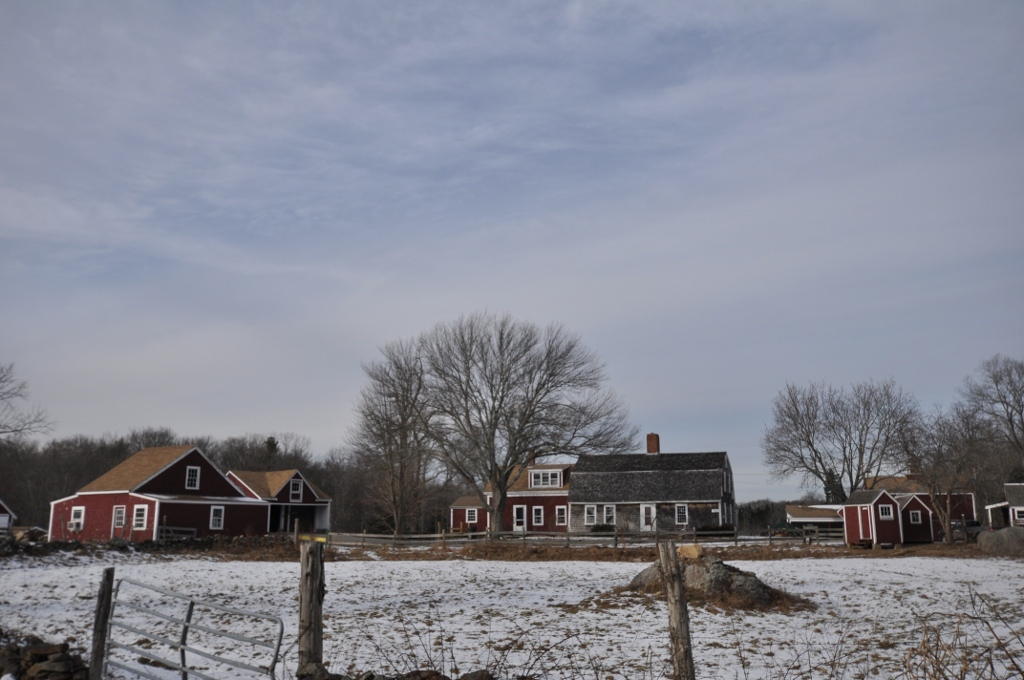

- Location within Massachusetts Location within the United States
- Location: 371 Fairview Ave., Rehoboth, Massachusetts
- Coordinates: 41°52′28″N 71°13′24″W
- Built: c. 1745
- Architect: Aaron Wheeler
- Architectural style: Colonial, Georgian
- MPS: Rehoboth MRA
- NRHP reference No.: 83000730
- Added to NRHP: June 6, 1983

The Aaron Wheeler House is a historic colonial house located at 371 Fairview Avenue in Rehoboth, Massachusetts.

== Description and history ==
The two-story gambrel-roofed wood-frame house was built c. 1745, and is one of the town's best-preserved examples of the style. It is also notable for its detailed deed history, which is also rare in Rehoboth. Aaron Wheeler, its builder, was a farmer, part owner of local industrial sites, and was an active participant in the American Revolutionary War.

The house was listed on the National Register of Historic Places on June 6, 1983.

== See also ==
- National Register of Historic Places listings in Bristol County, Massachusetts
