= Paula Rochon =

Canadian geriatrician

Academic background
- Education: Bachelor of Arts; Master's degree in Public Health 1983, MPH, 1990,
- Alma mater: McMaster University; Harvard T.H. Chan School of Public Health

Academic work
- Institutions: University of Toronto Faculty of Medicine; Women's College Hospital; Baycrest Health Sciences

Paula Ann Rochon is a Canadian geriatrician. She is the Retired Teachers of Ontario/ERO Chair in Geriatric Medicine at the University of Toronto.

== Early life and education ==
Rochon completed her Bachelor of Arts degree and medical degree at McMaster University in 1983 before completing her residency at the University of Toronto and fellowship at St George's, University of London. Upon completing her residency and fellowship, she enrolled at the Harvard T.H. Chan School of Public Health for her Master's degree in Public Health. During her time at Harvard, Rochon chose to focus on geriatrics due to both her grandparents living to 104.

== Career ==
Following her master's degree, Rochon joined Baycrest Health Sciences and the faculty at the University of Toronto. In this role, she focused on drug prescribing, specifically antipsychotics, and the elderly. During her tenure at Baycrest, Rochon aimed to determine the effects of pharmacological management of chronic disease in the elderly. She eventually joined Women's College Hospital where she continued to advocate for sex-specific research. As a result of her academic accomplishments, Rochon was elected a Fellow of the Canadian Academy of Health Sciences in 2013. She was later appointed the inaugural Retired Teachers of Ontario/ERO Chair in Geriatric Medicine at the University of Toronto in 2018. At the same time, Rochon was invited to become a member of the Canadian Institutes of Health Research's Institute Advisory Board for the Institute of Aging.

In 2020, Rochon was recognized by the University of Toronto with their Research of the Year (Clinical) Award. In January 2021, Rochon established the world's first Women's Age Lab to investigate the differences older women experience in health care. They specifically aimed to address research gaps in gendered ageism, aging in place and congregate care, therapies, and social connectedness.
