= Aaron Wheeler (chemist) =

Canadian chemist

Aaron R. Wheeler
- Born: United States
- Citizenship: American, Canadian
- Education: Stanford University; University of California, Los Angeles; Furman University
- Occupations: Professor of Chemistry, University of Toronto
- Known for: Digital Microfluidics
- Awards: The Arthur F. Findeis Award Fellowship (2012); Joseph Black Award (2012); Sciex Microsale Separations Innovations Medal (2019); Ricardo Aroca Award
- Scientific career
- Fields: Microfluidics, Analytical Chemistry, Biomedical Engineering
- Workplaces: University of Toronto
- Doctoral advisor: Richard Zare
- Website: microfluidics.utoronto.ca/index.php

Aaron R. Wheeler is a Canadian chemist who is a professor of chemistry and biomedical engineering at the University of Toronto since 2005 with cross-appointment at Institute of Biomedical Engineering and Terrence Donnelly Centre for Cellular and Biomolecular Research. His academic laboratory is located at Lash Miller Chemical Laboratories and Terrence Donnelly Centre for Cellular and Biomolecular Research at the University of Toronto. In 2005, Wheeler was appointed as assistant professor and Tier II Canada Research Chair then promoted to associate professor in 2010, full professor in 2013, and in 2018 he became the Tier I Canada Research Chair in Microfluidic Bioanalysis.

== Education ==
Wheeler did his undergraduate studies at Furman University in Greenville, SC then he joined Stanford University from 1997 to 2003 to obtain his Ph.D. in chemistry under supervision of Richard Zare . Following graduation, he took a two-year NIH postdoctoral fellowship at UCLA till 2005.

== Career ==
Wheeler's research focuses on developing lab-on-a-chip techniques for high-throughput proteomics, diagnostics and drug discovery. This involves using digital microfluidics (DMF) to manipulate fluid droplets on an array of electrodes with the goal of reducing analysis time and reagent consumption while integrating multiple functions onto a single device.

Practical applications of his work in DMF include its use in cell culture and clinical analysis. One of Wheeler's recent research methods, P-CLIP, has the potential to address issues that microfluidic researchers encounter when attempting to identify low-concentration target analytes in small sample sizes. This method could lead to progress in various assays, including the diagnosis of infectious diseases.

In 2018, Wheeler's lab team, adopted a hacker approach to create a portable, adaptable lab-on-a-chip diagnostic tool. They field-tested this system in Kakuma, Kenya, successfully measuring immunity levels to vaccine-preventable diseases in at-risk groups, conducting 600+ immunoassays on 150 patient samples using portable microfluidic systems during a three-week field trial. Their findings are published in the journal Science Translational Medicine.

Wheeler is Editor-in-chef for the microfluidics journal Lab on a Chip, published by the Royal Society of Chemistry. Before that he was as an associate editor for the same journal since 2013.

== Awards ==
Wheeler was awarded the Lab on a Chip Pioneers in Miniaturization Award (2017), an E.W.R. Steacie Fellowship from the Natural Sciences and Engineering Research Council of Canada (NSERC) (2015), a Connaught Foundation McLean Fellowship (2014), the Joseph Black Award from the Royal Society of Chemistry (2012), the Arthur F. Findeis Award from the American Chemical Society (2012), the Young Innovator Award in Analytical Chemistry (2011), and a Sloan Research Fellowship (2009).

In January 2024, Wheeler was honored with the Ricardo Aroca Award, recognizing his contributions to analytical chemistry and advancing lab-on-a-chip techniques, particularly through the use of digital microfluidics (DMF), which enables precise manipulation of liquid droplets on electrode arrays. The Award is bestowed upon a scientist living in Canada who has made a notable contribution to the discipline of analytical chemistry while conducting research within the country.
