= Marzyeh Ghassemi =

Canada-based researcher in the field of computational medicine

- Education: New Mexico State University; University of Oxford; MIT
- Scientific career
- Workplaces: University of Toronto; MIT
- Doctoral advisor: Peter Szolovits
- Website: healthyml.org/marzyeh/

Marzyeh Ghassemi is currently a professor at MIT, leading the Healthy ML lab which develops robust machine-learning algorithms, and works to understand how such models can best inform and improve health-care decisions. She was formerly an assistant professor at the University of Toronto's Department of Computer Science and Faculty of Medicine, holding a Canada CIFAR Artificial Intelligence (AI) chair and Canada Research Chair (Tier Two) in machine learning for health.

== Research career ==
Ghassemi pursued a bachelors of science degree in computer science and electrical engineering at New Mexico State University, a master's degree in biomedical engineering from Oxford University, and a PhD at the Massachusetts Institute of Technology (MIT).

During her PhD, Ghassemi collaborated with doctors based within Beth Israel Deaconess Medical Center's intensive care unit and noted the extensive amount of clinical data available. She then developed machine-learning algorithms to take in diverse clinical inputs and predict risks and mortality, such as the length of the patient's stay within the hospital, and whether additional interventions (such as blood transfusions) are necessary. In 2012, Ghassemi was a member of the Sana AudioPulse team, who won the GSMA Mobile Health Challenge as a result of developing a mobile phone app to screen for hearing impairment remotely. Ghassemi was also the lead PhD student in a study where accelerometer data collected from smart wearable devices to successfully detect differences between patients with muscle tension dysphonia (MTD) and those without MTD. Upon completing her PhD, Ghassemi was affiliated with both Alphabet’s Verily (as a visiting researcher) and at MIT (as a part-time post-doctoral researcher in Peter Szolovits' Computer Science and Artificial Intelligence Lab).

Ghassemi joined the University of Toronto in fall 2018, where she was co-appointed to the Department of Computer Science and the University of Toronto's Faculty of Medicine, making her the first joint hire in computational medicine for the university. Ghassemi's lab was titled the Machine Learning for Health (ML4H) lab. Ghassemi was also a faculty member at the Vector Institute. She held the Canada CIFAR Artificial Intelligence (AI) Chair position. In June 2019, Ghassemi was appointed a Canada Research Chair (Tier Two) in machine learning for health.

Ghassemi joined MIT in 2021, as a professor in Electrical Engineering and Computer Science, and the Institute for Medical Engineering and Science. Ghassemi was selected for a National Science Foundation CAREER award, and has been cited over 13,000 times with an h-index and i-10 index of 54 and 122 respectively. During her PhD she was named as one of the 35 Innovators Under 35, in the visionaries category, in MIT Technology Review's annual list., and prior to her PhD she was awarded the Barry M. Goldwater Scholarship and the Marshall Scholarship.

== Selected bibliography ==
- Ethical machine learning in healthcare. Irene Chen, Emma Pierson, Sherri Rose, Shalmali Joshi, Kadija Ferryman, Marzyeh Ghassemi. Annual Review of Biomedical Data Science 4, 123-144.
- The false hope of current approaches to explainable artificial intelligence in health care. Marzyeh Ghassemi, Luke Oakden-Rayner, Andrew L. Beam. The Lancet Digital Health 3 (11), e745-e750.
- Underdiagnosis bias of artificial intelligence algorithms applied to chest radiographs in under-served patient populations. Laleh Seyyed-Kalantari, Haoran Zhang, Matthew McDermott, Irene Chen, Marzyeh Ghassemi. Nature Medicine 27 (12), 2176-2182.
