= Willard G. Oxtoby =

Willard Gurdon Oxtoby (July 29, 1933 – March 6, 2003) was an American theologian who studied and taught comparative religion, and was the founding director of the Graduate Centre for Religious Studies at the University of Toronto.

== Early life ==
Oxtoby was born on July 29, 1933, in Kentfield, California into a family of scholars. Both his father and grandfather were ministers and teachers of the Old Testament, and both were deans of San Francisco Theological Seminary, in San Anselmo, CA. He graduated in 1950 from Tamalpais High School, Mill Valley, California.

== Education ==
After graduating with a degree in philosophy from Stanford University (1955), Oxtoby completed masters (1961) and doctoral degrees (1962) at Princeton University, specializing in pre-Islamic Arabic inscriptions. From 1958–1960 he worked in Jerusalem as part of the team that studied the Dead Sea Scrolls.

== Career ==
Oxtoby's first teaching job was at McGill University in Montreal, Quebec (1960–64), where he launched the university's inaugural course on Judaism. After a few years, he realized he needed to explore the influences on the religion of the Hebrews following their Babylonian exile, so he undertook two years of post-doctoral work at Harvard University (1964–66) to study Zoroastrianism, an ancient faith born in Persia, and possibly the world's first monotheistic religion.

Oxtoby taught at Yale University from 1966–1971, before accepting a full professorship at the University of Toronto's Trinity College, where he taught for 28 years (1971–99). There he founded the Graduate Centre for Religious Studies in 1976, which he directed (1976–81). Driven by his interest in comparative religion, Oxtoby travelled to more than a hundred countries and studied more than a dozen languages, including Hebrew, Arabic, Ugaritic and Sanskrit.

In terms of publications, Oxtoby was probably best known for the two-volume introductory textbook he edited, called World Religions: Western Traditions and World Religions: Eastern Traditions, published by Oxford University Press (1996; 2nd edn 2002).

== Personal life ==
Oxtoby married Layla Jurji in 1958 (1935–1980), with whom he had a son and a daughter. A year after her death from cancer, he married Julia Ching (1934–2001), who also died from the disease.

Oxtoby died of colon cancer in Toronto on March 6, 2003.
