= Centre for Addiction and Mental Health =

Coordinates: 43.64455°N 79.41761°W

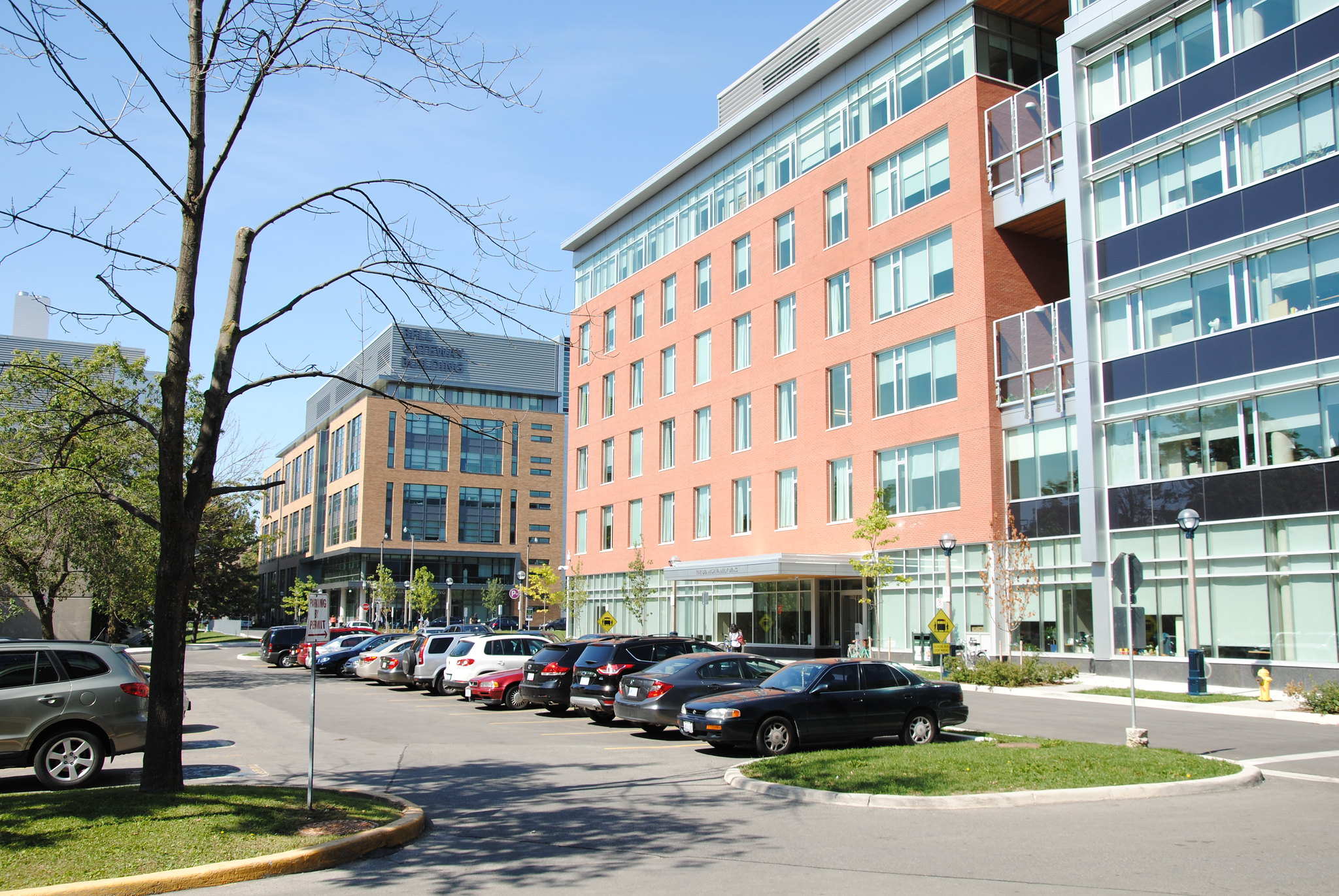
- CAMH Queen Street Site.

Geography
- Location: Toronto, Ontario, Canada

Organization
- Care system: Public Medicare (Canada) (OHIP)
- Type: Teaching
- Affiliated university: University of Toronto
- Network: TAHSN

Services
- Emergency department: Yes
- Beds: 493
- Speciality: Psychiatric

History
- Former names: Queen Street Mental Health Centre; Clarke Institute of Psychiatry; Addiction Research Foundation; Donwood Institute
- Founded: 1998

Links
- Website: www.camh.ca
- Lists: Hospitals in Canada

The Centre for Addiction and Mental Health (CAMH, pronounced /kæm.eɪtʃ/ KAM-aytch, French: Centre de toxicomanie et de santé mentale) is a psychiatric teaching hospital located in Toronto and ten community locations throughout the province of Ontario, Canada. It reports being the largest research facility in Canada for mental health and addictions. The hospital was formed in 1998 from the amalgamation of four separate institutions – the Queen Street Mental Health Centre, the Clarke Institute of Psychiatry, the Addiction Research Foundation, and the Donwood Institute. It is Canada's largest mental health teaching hospital, and the only stand-alone psychiatric emergency department in Ontario. CAMH has 90 distinct clinical services across inpatient, outpatient, day treatment, and partial hospitalization models. CAMH has been the site of major advancements in psychiatric research, including the discovery of the Dopamine receptor D2.

CAMH is fully affiliated with the University of Toronto as part of the Toronto Academic Health Science Network (TAHSN).

== History ==
CAMH was formed from the 1998 merger of the Queen Street Mental Health Centre with the Clarke Institute of Psychiatry, Addiction Research Foundation, and Donwood Institute.

=== Queen Street Mental Health Centre ===
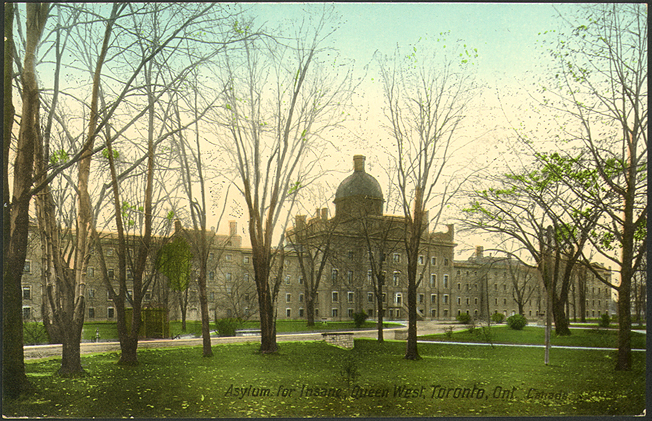
Queen Street Asylum for the Insane, 1910

The Queen Street Mental Health Centre opened as the Provincial Lunatic Asylum on 26 January 1850. It was subsequently renamed Asylum for the Insane, then Hospital for the Insane, then Ontario Hospital (1919), and then the Queen Street Mental Health Centre (1966). It had also been called the Toronto Lunatic Asylum and 999 Queen Street West.

The original building was designed by architect John George Howard and built by John Ritchey. An example of Neoclassical architecture, it featured a centralized dome and drew inspiration from the National Gallery in London, England. The walls surrounding the building grounds, designed by Frederick William Cumberland and Thomas Ridout, were installed in 1851 using brick with stone trim that reflected Howard's design for the building. Wings and outbuildings designed by Kivas Tully were added in the 1850s to address overcrowding. The buildings were constructed in a series of rigid lines and sharp angles, consistent with the belief at the time that orderly physical structure would facilitate orderly mental states for the patients. High walls segregated the patients from the community, establishing a long-standing stigma about the facility.

The Queen Street Site of CAMH contained the Samuel A. Malcolmson Lecture Theatre, named for the site's Chief Psychiatrist and Clinical Director of Forensics. In 2009, however, Malcolmson was subject to a disciplinary hearing of Ontario's College of Physicians and Surgeons, following that he sexually abused a patient and fathered a child with her. Malcomson pleaded "no contest" and resigned his license to practice. The lecture hall was renamed the Queen Street Auditorium.

Reforms were made after a series of deaths at the Queen Street Mental Health Centre and newspaper accounts of involuntary drug treatment, electroshock therapy, and prison-like conditions.

=== Clarke Institute of Psychiatry ===
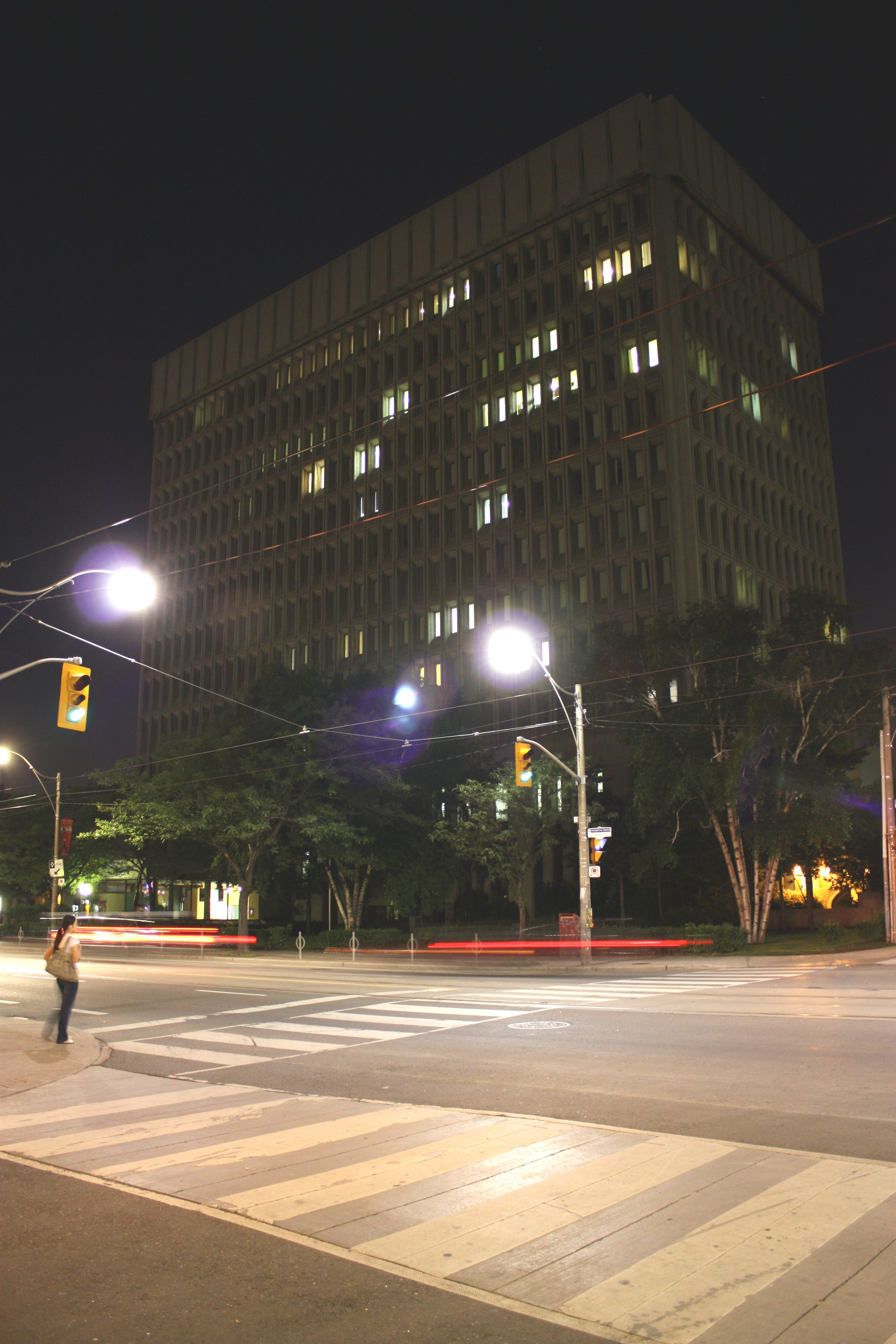
CAMH College Street site

The institute was founded in 1966 and officially opened by Ontario Premier John P. Robarts. It was named the Clarke Institute of Psychiatry, after Charles Kirk Clarke, a pioneer in mental health in Canada. The institute took over the clinical, teaching, and research functions of the Toronto Psychiatric Hospital, located at 2 Surrey Place, which opened in 1925 under Clarence B. Farrar. The Institute served as the main psychiatry teaching hospital for the University of Toronto and was the headquarters for the Department of Psychiatry in the Faculty of Medicine. The first Medical and Executive Director of the Clarke was Charles Roberts, and the first Psychiatrist-in-Chief (and Professor and Head of the Department of Psychiatry at the University of Toronto) was Aldwyn B. Stokes. When Stokes retired in 1967, the administration was reorganized, and Robin Hunter became Medical Director and Psychiatrist-in-Chief.

Fredrick H. Lowy served as Psychiatrist-in-Chief of the Clarke from 1974 until 1980, followed by Vivian Rakoff from 1980 to 1990, and Paul E. Garfinkel from 1990 until the Clarke's 1998 merger into CAMH.

Upon its merger into CAMH in 1998, the Clarke building become known as the CAMH College Street site. Conrad Black has been a generous supporter of the Clarke Institute of Psychiatry.

==== Rent increase ====
In 2015, CAMH's facilities at the College St. site were put in jeopardy following notice of a rent increase from $1.2 million to $4 million per year, at the renewal of its 20-year lease. CAMH valued its property at $25 million, whereas the hospital's landlord, Brookfield Asset Management, valued it at $100 million. Brookfield turned down CBC's interview requests. A government arbitrator was appointed who valued the property at $55 million, yielding a rent increase that CAMH was reportedly able to pay.

=== Addiction Research Foundation ===
The Addiction Research Foundation (ARF), then named the Alcoholism Research Foundation was founded in 1949, when H. David Archibald, who had studied at the School of Alcohol Studies at Yale University, was hired by the Liquor Control Board of Ontario. His mandate was to determine the scope of alcoholism in Ontario. He was named executive director when ARF opened and remained in that post until 1976. Focusing initially on outpatient treatment, their first facility was Brookside Hospital in 1951, expanding to branch offices and new locations in 1954, the same year they set up in-house research. In 1961, formally renamed the Alcoholism and Drug Addiction Research Foundation of Ontario, ARF expanded its mission to include drugs. In 1971, they expanded to a clinical teaching hospital called the Clinical Research and Treatment Institute. In 1978 ARF opened the School for Addiction Studies and expanded their international role in policy development and research. Following provincial hospital restructuring in the 1990s, ARF was folded in 1998 into CAMH.

=== Donwood Institute ===
In 1946, R. Gordon Bell opened a clinic in his own home for people needing mental health services. There existed an Ontario statute allowing doctors to take up to four patients into their homes without a hospital license. To his surprise, his only patients all suffered from alcoholism. It soon became necessary to move to larger facilities. To expand capacity, Bell opened Shadow Brook, which operated from 1947 to 1954, and then the Bell Clinic, which operated from 1954 to 1966. The Donwood Institute then opened in 1967, with 47 beds and a 4-month waiting list in the 1980s. Still focused on substance use, it claimed a 65% recovery rate for general population and an 85% recovery rate among physicians with addictions.

=== CAMH Queen St. Site Redevelopment ===
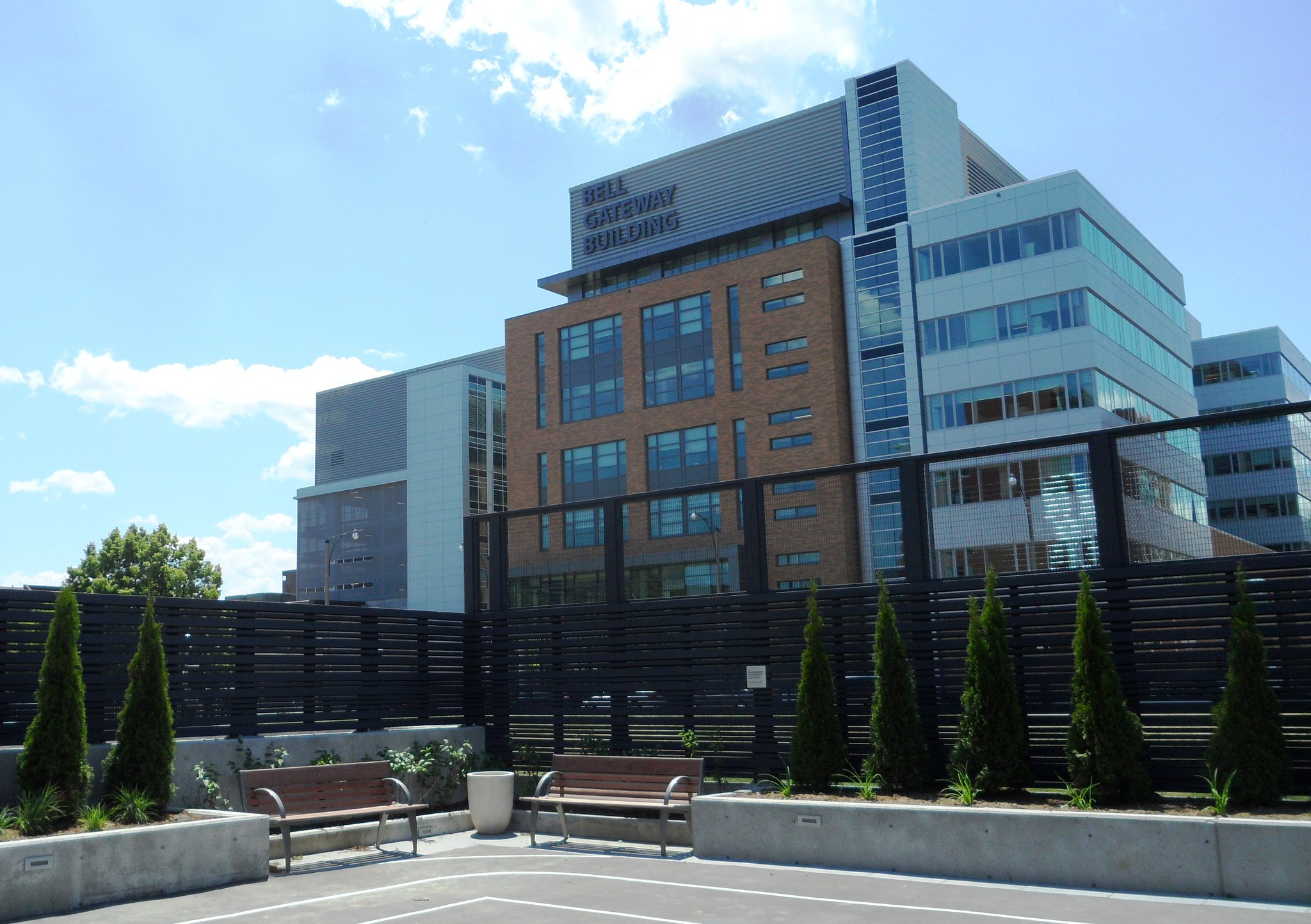
CAMH Queen St. Site, Bell Gateway Building

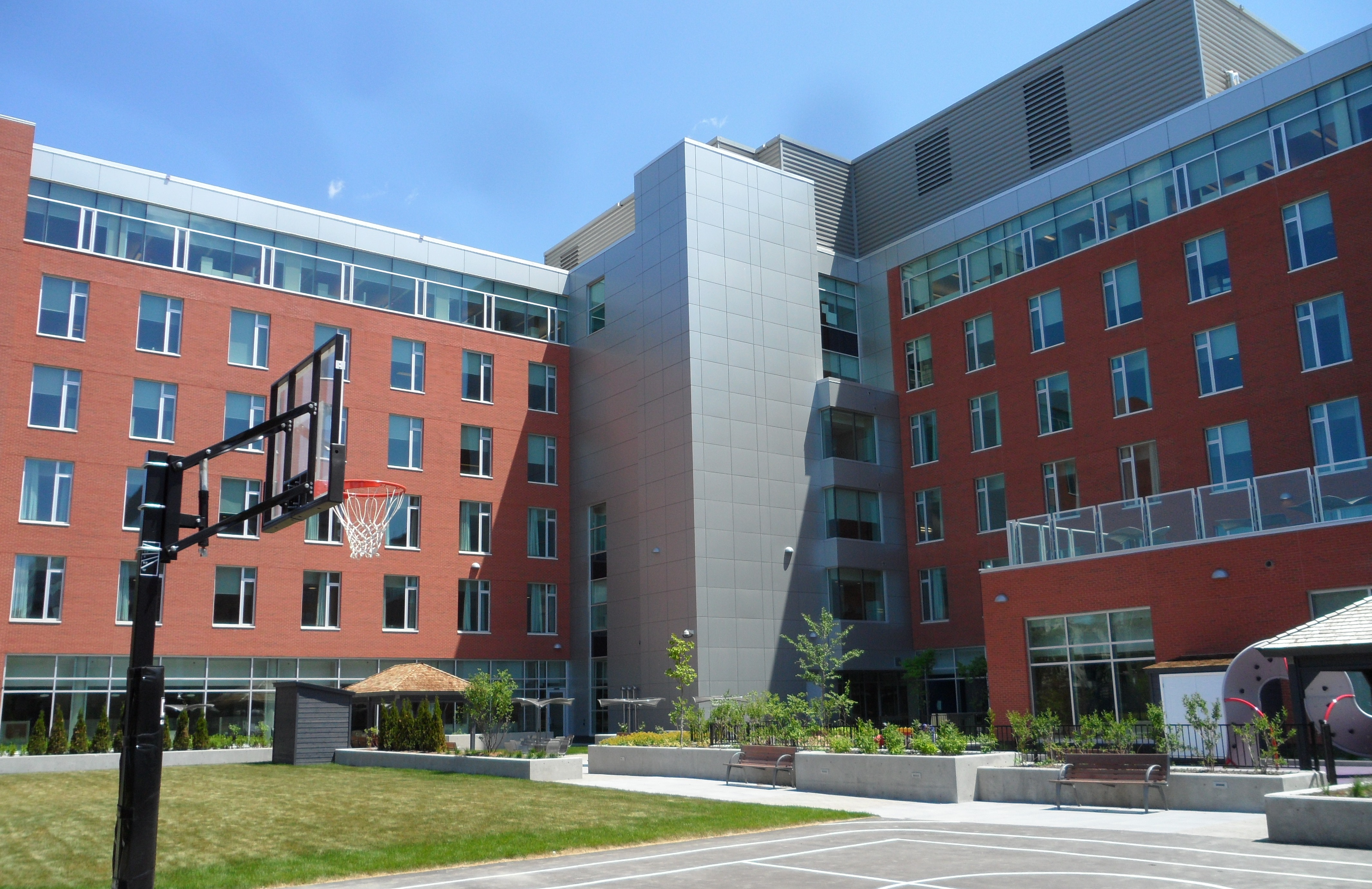
CAMH Queen St. Site, Intergenerational Wellness Centre

CAMH has been undergoing a three phase redevelopment centered at its Queen Street site, with four goals: 1) Deliver a new model of care and provide a healthy environment that promotes recovery; 2) Bring together the best research, clinical, education, health promotion, and policy experts in one place to change the future of mental health and addictions; 3) Revitalize the City of Toronto by opening up their site and by creating an inclusive new nine-block neighbourhood that benefits all and, 4) Change attitudes by breaking down barriers to eliminate the stigma of mental health. Phase 1A was undertaken by Eastern Construction and completed in 2008 and Phase 1B was undertaken by Carillion and completed in 2012. Phase 1C is being undertaken by PCL Construction and is expected to be complete in 2020.

In 2008, CAMH announced the completion of four new buildings (forming Phase 1A of the project) to accommodate CAMH's Addiction and Mood & Anxiety Programs.

The Campbell Family Mental Health Research Institute was established with a $30 million donation in 2011 from Linda Campbell, Gaye Farncombe, and Susan Grange, each granddaughters of Canadian magnate Roy Thomson and nieces of Ken Thomson. CAMH CEO, Catherine Zahn, said research on the brain is the most promising pathway to progress in mental illness research. Bell donated $10 million to CAMH in 2011, reportedly the largest corporate gift in Canada to mental illness.

In 2012, CAMH announced the completion of three new buildings (forming Phase 1B of the project): the Bell Gateway Building for the central administration, a utilities and parking building, and the Intergenerational Wellness Centre which includes 12 new beds for youth ages 14–18.

Margaret McCain, the former lieutenant-governor of New Brunswick and widow of McCain Foods co-founder Wallace McCain, donated $10 million to CAMH in 2012 to establish the Margaret and Wallace McCain Centre for Child, Youth and Family Mental Health. In 2013, the Slaight Family donated to $50 million to health care institutions, of which CAMH received $10 million. The donation permitted the opening of a centre dedicated to identifying and treating early signs of mental illness in youth.

In 2014, philanthropist and business executive Andrew Fass donated $1,000,000 to CAMH for the hospital to create a wellness program for its staff. In 2016, Fass withdrew his donation, saying that CAMH was unable to show how they were spending the money. The grant was to be used for CAMH's "Well@Work" program, an initiative to provide Canadian workplaces with training to identify risks of mental illness and strategies to support employees in need.

CAMH opened the Emergency Department in 2014, funded by a $2.5 million private donation and a $4.2 million grant from the Ontario Ministry of Health and Long-Term Care.

In 2016, CAMH constructed a sweat lodge for Aboriginal patients in order to promote spiritual, physical, and emotional healing. Also in 2016, CAMH opened walk-in clinics for youth.

In 2020, the eight-storey, 110 patient bed McCain Complex Care & Recovery Building and five-storey 125 patient bed Crisis & Critical Care Building and 24-hour psychiatric emergency department were opened.

== Research ==
CAMH reports being the largest research facility in Canada for mental health and addictions, including over 100 scientists over 150 research trainees. In the 2014-2015 fiscal year, CAMH received $44,384,230 in research funding and published more than 500 research articles.

== Administration ==
Psychiatrist and Clarke Institute President Paul E. Garfinkel was appointed the first President and CEO of CAMH in 1998. He was followed by neurologist Catherine Zahn in 2009.

Upon CAMH's formation, Peter Catford was appointed vice president for Information Technology. In 2002, Catford outsourced the public hospital's computer needs to H.I. Next, a private company which Catford founded and co-owned. When the Toronto Star reported on what it deemed an apparent conflict of interest regarding the spending of public money, the hospital would not reveal how much it paid Catford or his company, nor would CAMH disclose any details of its contract with H.I. Next or what other firms bid on the work. Catford commented only that "I feel honoured to work with (CAMH) and I feel like it has been done ethically." In interviews with the Toronto Star, Dev Chopra, executive vice-president of CAMH first said there was nothing inappropriate about Catford's role. "We got into it with our eyes open. There is no conflict." However, Chopra later said there were "some optics from a conflict perspective" noting the hospital might revisit the issue that day. Catford left his CAMH position two days later, but the Star reported that hospital officials said changes were being considered months before the Star published its story about the issue.

== Criticisms ==
CAMH's administration has come under criticism including from staff who report safety problems and from donors who withdrew their funding citing accountability problems.

=== David Healy Affair ===
Soon after CAMH was founded, its administration was embroiled in a scandal involving Eli Lilly and Company, which donated $1.5 million to CAMH, and David Healy, a prominent critic of Prozac, the widely used antidepressant manufactured by Eli Lilly. CAMH hired Healy to be the head of its Mood and Anxiety Program, but withdrew the job offer after hearing about Healy's views.

CAMH aggressively recruited Healy, and CAMH Physician-in-Chief, David Goldbloom, offered Healy a job as the head of the Mood and Anxiety Program. Healy accepted and soon after gave a lecture in which he reiterated his views about Prozac increasing risk of suicide. A few days later, Goldbloom withdrew the job offer, saying "Essentially, we believe that it is not a good fit between you and the role as leader of an academic program in mood and anxiety disorders at the centre and in relation to the university….We do not feel your approach is compatible with the goals for development of the academic and clinical resource that we have."

The decision caused an "uproar" among Canadian academics, with the Canadian Association of University Teachers calling CAMH actions "an affront to academic freedom in Canada." Scientists from 13 countries, including Nobel laureates Julius Axelrod and Arvid Carlsson, protested CAMH's actions as did the Society for Academic Freedom and Scholarship (SAFS).

Healy sued CAMH and the University of Toronto, alleging breach of contract, defamation, and denial of academic freedom. The lawsuit sought damages of $9.4 million, including $2.6 million from CAMH CEO Paul Garfinkel, and $1.4 million from the U of T Dean of Medicine. The university distanced itself from CAMH: According to U of T President, Robert Birgeneau, "Everyone is trying to blame the university for something that happened at one of our hospitals."

The lawsuit was settled with Healy receiving an appointment as visiting professor at the University of Toronto. The president of the Canadian Association of University Teachers, Vic Catano, said "We see the settlement as a complete vindication for Dr. Healy."

=== Child Gender Identity Clinic ===
In 1975, psychiatrist Susan Bradley founded a clinic in CAMH to work with gender dysphoric children. Bradley collaborated for many years with psychologist Kenneth Zucker, and they established the clinic as the largest gender identity service in Canada and an international center for research. They said that in their studies, 80% of the children grow out of the behavior. They used different approaches with children than adolescents because they said that children were more likely to identify with their birth sex.

Regarding adolescents, Zucker would "support a teenager or adult who wants to transition using hormones and surgeries." Regarding children, however, Zucker said, "We are trying to help a child feel more comfortable with the gender identity that matches their birth sex," and that they use a variety of techniques to "help a child think more flexibly" about their gender. According to a 2006 article in The New York Times, Zucker did this by "encouraging same-sex friendships and activities like board games that move beyond strict gender roles." Zucker said that a child could be asked to make a list of pros and cons about being different genders so that the child realizes that "there are both good and not so good things about being a boy and being a girl."

Zucker's approach was controversial and considered by some to be conversion therapy. In January 2015, members of Rainbow Health Ontario, a provincial health promotion and navigation organization, approached CAMH expressing their concerns regarding Zucker's clinic. Rainbow Health Ontario submitted a review of academic literature and clinical practices for transgender youth, and expressed concern that the gender identity clinic was not following accepted practices. Others online linked the Gender Identity Clinic's practices to suicide of transgender youth caused by conversion therapy, and referenced the high-profile case of Leelah Alcorn, a transgender teen from Ohio. In February 2015, CAMH ordered an external review of its gender identity clinic for children and teens.

In March 2015, the Ontario Provincial Parliament introduced the Affirming Sexual Orientation and Gender Identity Act, aimed at banning conversion therapy practices. In June 2015, the legislation was passed unanimously by the provincial parliament. The law made LGBT conversion therapy illegal to provide to minors, and removed it from public health insurance coverage for adults. After the bill was passed into law, CAMH stated that they welcomed the unanimous support for the bill.

The external review noted numerous strengths of the clinic, but also described it as an insular entity with an approach dissimilar from other clinics and described it as being out of step with current best practices, including WPATH SOC Version 7. They also raised concerns about clinicians asking age inappropriate questions. After the review, CAMH shut down the clinic and fired Zucker. Kwame McKenzie, medical director of CAMH's child, youth, and family services, said "We want to apologize for the fact that not all of the practices in our childhood gender identity clinic are in step with the latest thinking." CAMH announced a process of consultation with community leaders to examine how best to offer care.

In 2018, CAMH paid Zucker $586,000 and issued a public apology as part of a settlement.

=== Forensics ===
CAMH's forensic department and its leadership have been the subject of criticism from Ontario judges and the public for issues including public safety, patient civil rights violations, and turning away patients ordered to CAMH by judges. This culminated in Ontario Superior Court Justice Maureen Forestell who reportedly "tore a strip off of" CAMH for its actions. Graham Glancy, a forensic psychiatrist at the Maplehurst Correctional Complex accused CAMH of focusing too much on patients and treatments to enhance its international reputation, but at the expense of the less glamorous forensic patients. He added "Cities like Ottawa and London are better resourced but Toronto is terrible. It's a disgrace, really." Toronto defence counsel Chris Hynes also attributed the problems to the CAMH leadership, saying "CAMH front-line workers pay the price for decisions made by the centre's privatized board of directors."

==== AWOL patients ====
One recurrent issue has been the number of violent or dangerous patients who escape custody from CAMH's forensic wards. After filing a freedom of information act request with the police, the Toronto Star reported that CAMH had nearly as many AWOLs as all other Toronto hospitals combined (2,060 and 2,371 for the period 2004 to 2014).

One of the most widely reported incidents involved Thomas Brailsford, who was institutionalized at CAMH after beheading his mother and being deemed a "danger to himself and others." Brailsford took off from a taxicab on his way to a medical appointment, representing his second escape in a year.

In an interview with Toronto columnist Jerry Agar, CAMH's chief of forensic psychiatry, Sandy Simpson said "Clearly, we will be reviewing this carefully to look at how we assessed the risk in this case." Kate Richards of CAMH media relations subsequently said "We have tightened aspects of these procedures and...We are confident that the changes implemented in this case have been effective." Agar wrote that he has "been eager to have Simpson back on the radio show to discuss what measures have been put in place" but had not received any response. Five months later, CAMH told Agar "Dr. Simpson is not available for a follow-up interview."

In 2019, the Ontario government ordered a review of CAMH patient passes and privileges after a series of patient escapes from the secure forensic psychiatry units. In one case, a not criminally responsible (NCR) patient who absconded the hospital later left the country by plane.

=== Workplace safety ===
In 2007, following a series of attacks on staff by patients, the Ontario Ministry of Labour asked CAMH to develop a workplace violence and policy program. In 2008, the Ministry of Labour laid nine workplace safety charges against CAMH in response to allegations by staff that they had been attacked by patients. CAMH was fined $70,000 in 2009 for two attacks against nursing staff by patients in 2007 and 2008. In 2014, the Ontario Ministry of Labour laid charges against CAMH for failing to protect workers from workplace violence by patients following an attack earlier that year.

In 2014, the Ontario Ministry of Labour laid more charges against CAMH for failing to implement procedures to protect staff from workplace violence following another attack by a patient that year. The prosecution asked the court to send “a clear message” that the CAMH situation was unacceptable. CAMH was found guilty and fined again. CAMH's Chief of Nursing, Rani Srivastava, said that CAMH accepted the court's decision adding that the violence had a “devastating impact” on “all of us at CAMH.”

Three months later, another nurse was punched, kicked in the face and dragged by a patient into a locked utility room where she was repeatedly kicked in the head by the patient, suffering fractures and nerve damage. Vicki McKenna of the Ontario Nurses' Association reported that CAMH has not been taking part in government committees to improve workplace safety and called for CAMH senior management to be held personally responsible for the continued workplace violence. Rani Srivastava said that the incident was "completely unexpected," that CAMH is "saddened" and "shocked" by what happened, and that "any incident is one too many."

=== Reporting failures ===
Simpson has also been criticized by the Ontario Review Board for secluding a patient for two months but not informing the board, as required. Simpson claimed that the regulation "was unclear" about whether CAMH had a duty to report what it was doing. The board disagreed, ruling against CAMH.

== Public policy statements ==
CAMH issues statements about local and provincial regulations on addictive behaviors. CAMH policy opposes the privatization of alcohol sales, citing evidence that the increase in availability increases alcohol-related harms and associated costs. They supported that the Liquor Control Board of Ontario should maintain its monopoly on alcohol sales. CAMH referred to "the plan to allow the sale of VQA wines at farmers' markets across the province" as "cause for concern" because it would increase access to alcohol. Similarly, together with other health organizations, CAMH called for a provincial alcohol strategy, ahead of Ontario's plan to permit the sale of beer in grocery stores. In a 2014 policy document, CAMH expressed support for the legalization of marijuana with strict control regulations. According to CAMH CEO, Catherine Zahn, "Only through legalization can we implement a public-health approach, treating cannabis use as a health issue and not one to be addressed through law enforcement and the court system. This is the approach we take with tobacco and alcohol. As with alcohol, a legal cannabis market can be regulated with controls that address risk factors associated with use". CAMH has opposed the expansion of Toronto's Woodbine Racetrack. In a policy statement, CAMH said increased availability of gambling results in increased harms and predicted that a large portion of any increased revenues from the racetrack would come from people with gambling problems.

== See also ==
- GL-II-73 (experimental drug against Alzheimer's disease)
