= Audrius V. Plioplys =

American painter (born 1951)

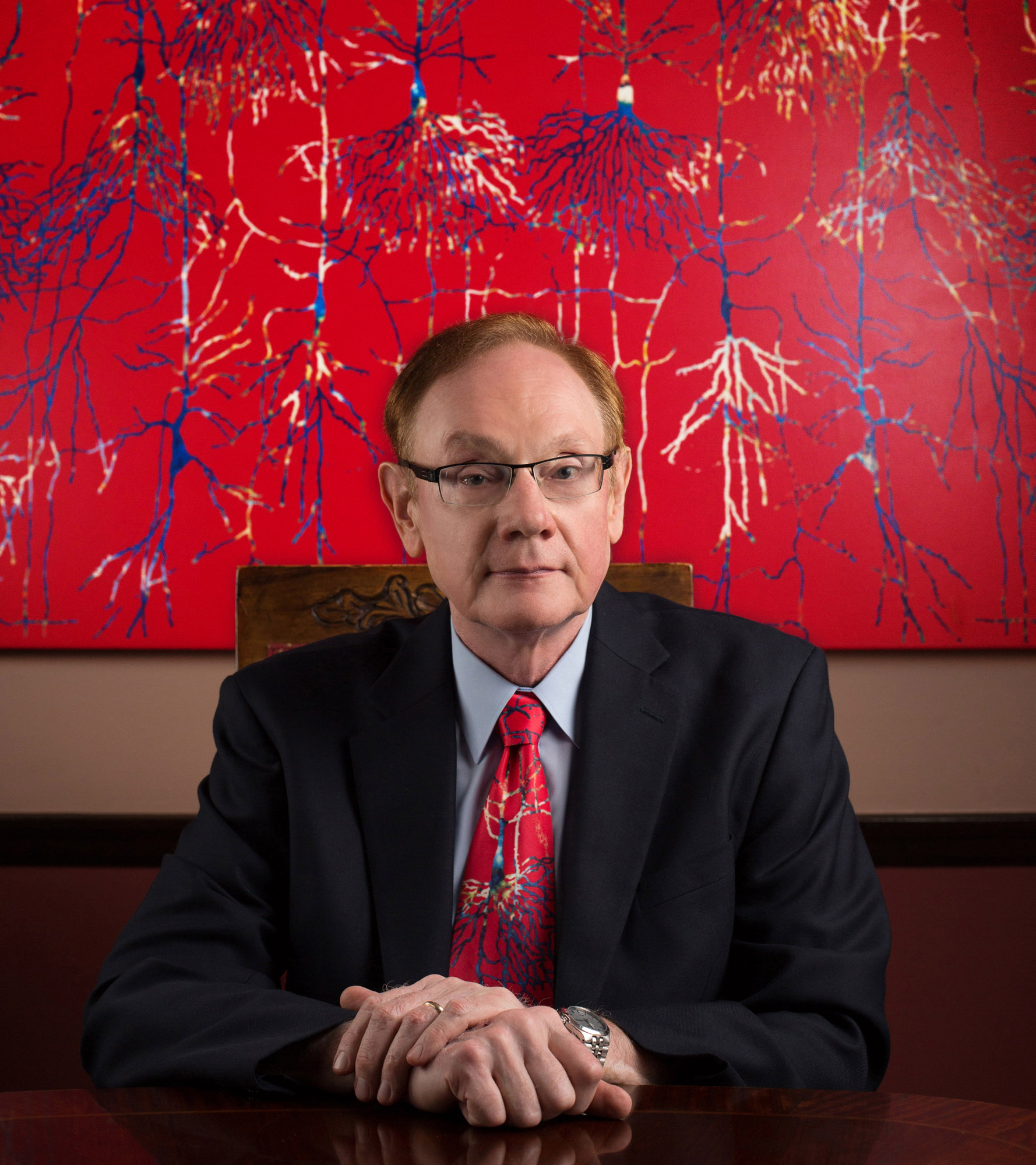
- Born: 1951 (age 74–75); Toronto, Ontario
- Education: University of Chicago (Majors of Physics and Chemistry) University of Chicago (MD) Medical internship: the University of Wisconsin, Madison, WI Independent study of art and art history, Washington, D.C. Adult Neurology: Mayo Clinic, Rochester, MN Child Neurology: Hospital for Sick Children, Toronto, Canada
- Scientific career
- Fields: Artist, neurologist, neuroscientist
- Website: https://plioplys.com/ https://www.silkneuroart.com/ https://www.hopeandspirit.net/ http://ramute-plioplys.com/

Audrius V. Plioplys is a Canadian artist, neurologist, neuroscientist and public figure of Lithuanian descent.

== Early life ==
Plioplys was born in Toronto, Ontario, Canada to immigrants from Lithuania. His father was from Pliopliu Kaimas, Kazlu Ruda, and his mother was from Plungė. In 1962 his family moved to Chicago, United States. He graduated from St. Rita High School in 1968 as a valedictorian and went on to study physics and chemistry at the University of Chicago until 1971. Plioplys studied at the Pritzker School of Medicine, University of Chicago, and graduated with an MD degree in June 1975.

After graduating from Pritzker School of Medicine, Plioplys completed a medical internship from June 1975 to June 1976 in adult internal medicine at the University of Wisconsin Hospitals, Madison, Wisconsin. He then left medicine to pursue art full-time

== Career ==
=== Art career ===
Plioplys artistic path started in Toronto when a childhood friend, Algis Cesekas, introduced him to oil painting. It was during medical school at the University of Chicago, that Plioplys became seriously engaged in artistic activities, creating oil paintings, visiting museums and galleries, and studying the history of art. After completing an internship in 1976 he left medicine and dedicated himself to art.

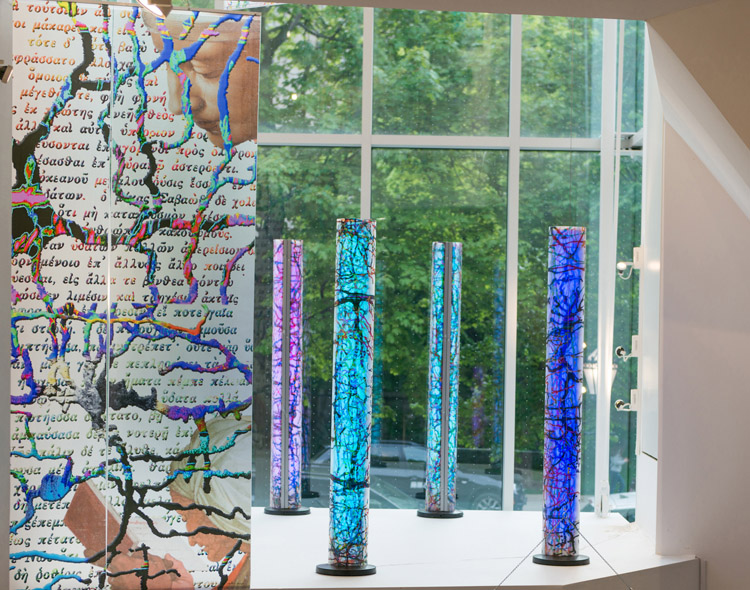
The art piece Memory Cycles is displayed in the Audrius Plioplys Atrium of the University of Chicago.

During these years he had many exhibitions and studied the work of the Lithuanian painter and composer M. K. Ciurlionis. Plioplys made some original discoveries, which were published and included in his book Ciurlionis: Mintys / Thoughts. Plioplys had over 50 art exhibitions. The first one was in 1978 at the Washington Project for the Arts, Washington, D.C.

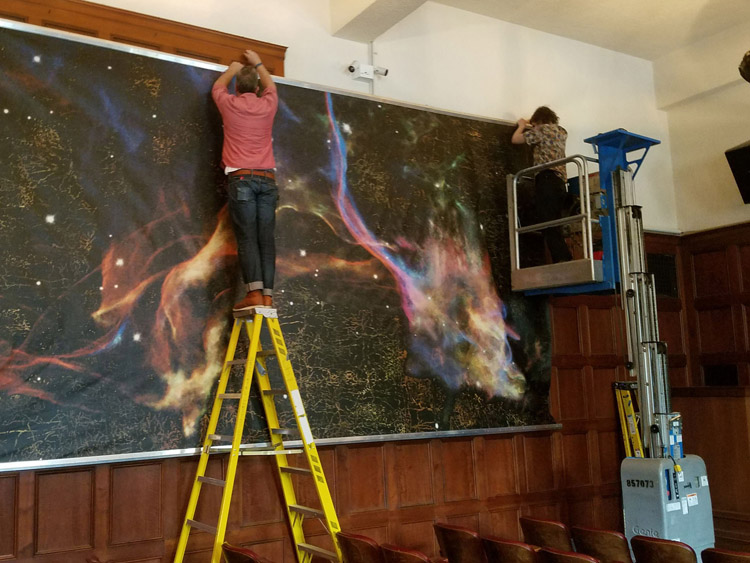
Installing Veil at the Oriental Institute

In Chicago, his art is on permanent display at the Blue Man Group, Illinois Institute of Technology, University of Chicago, Blackstone Hotel, Rockefeller Memorial Chapel, Brookfield Zoo, and Beverly Arts Center. In Minneapolis, eight pieces, including large scale ones, are on permanent display at the American Academy of Neurology. Plioplys’ art is held in many US and overseas museum collections, including the Art Institute and the Museum of Contemporary Art—both in Chicago—the British Library in London, UK; Harvard University, Cambridge, US, Instituto Cajal, Madrid, Spain; and National M. K. Ciurlionis Art Museum and the Lithuanian National Museum of Art, Vilnius, Lithuania;. His installation piece "Mirror Neurons" is on the cover of the Oxford University Press book Consciousness and the Social Brain.

In 2011 and 2012, Plioplys addressed post-World War II history in Eastern Europe. The project was called Hope and Spirit, and took place at the Balzekas Museum of Lithuanian Culture in Chicago to mark the 70th anniversary of the beginning of mass deportations from the Baltic republics to Siberia.

This two-year project was highly successful in bringing the suffering caused by Stalin to the public’s attention. He was designated the American-Lithuanian community’s Man of the Year in 2012. He has also installed a 230-boulder installation at Varnupiai Sacred Mound (piliakalnis) in Lithuania. This installation took place to honor the famed archeologist, Marija Giimbutas.

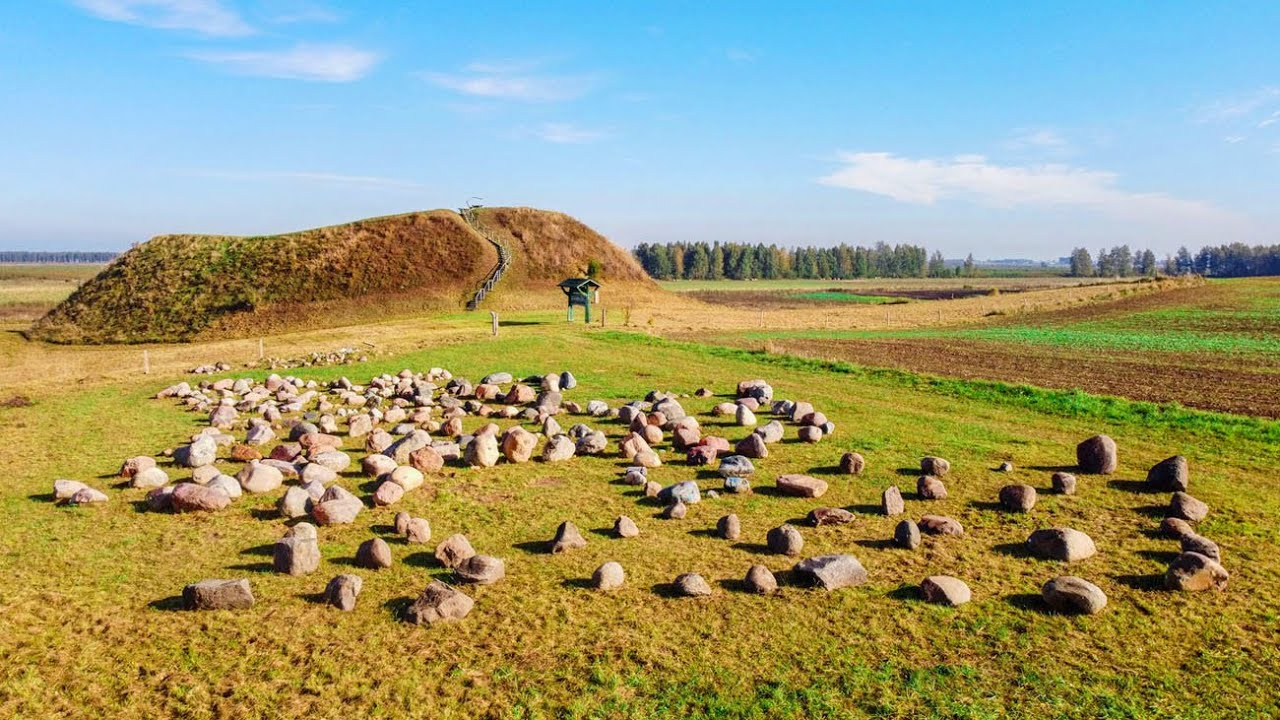
A 230-boulder installation by Audrius Plioplys at Varnupiai Sacred Mound (piliakalnis) in Lithuania. This installation took place to honor the famed archeologist, Marija Giimbutas.

His most recent line of art is in the world of fashion which includes large-scale, pure silk scarves. Plioplys wrote “art of quality affects the viewer emotionally, psychologically and intellectually. When such pieces can also be experienced through softness, warmth, touch--then they become magical.” His latest series is called “Spellbound in Silk”.

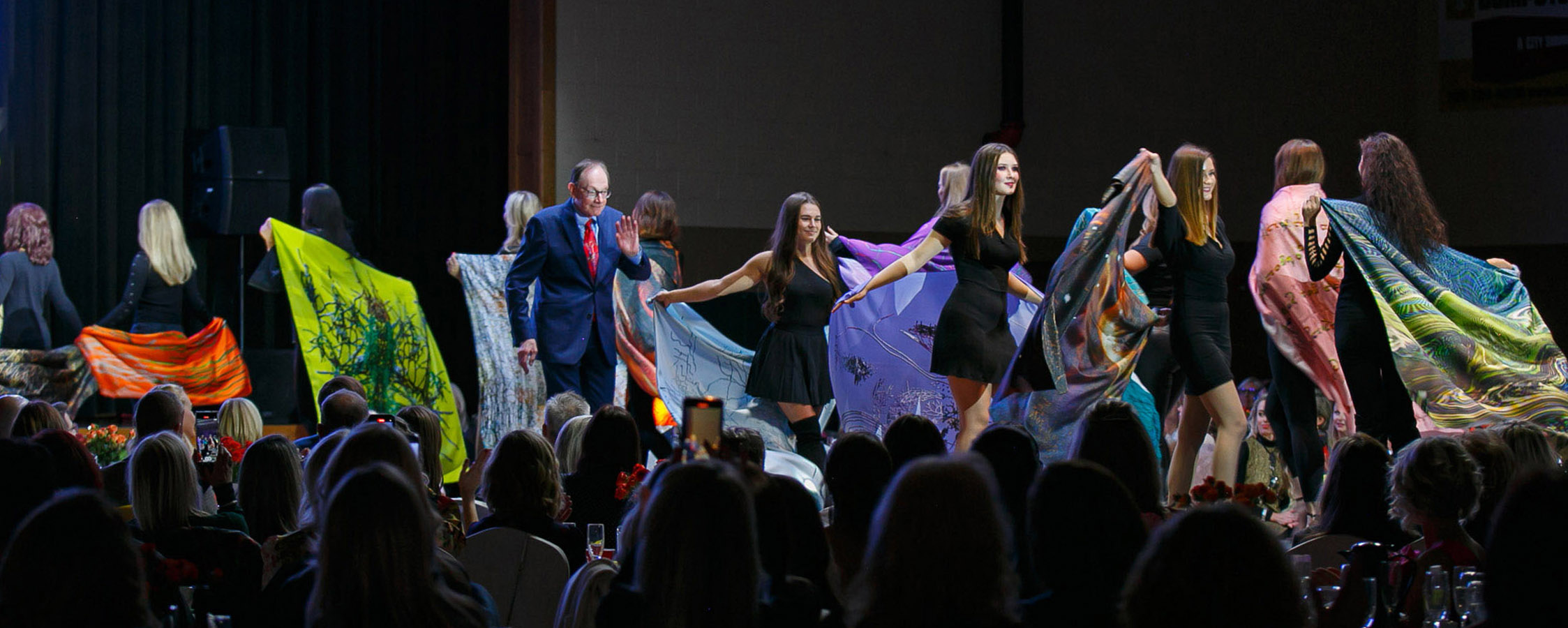
Plioplys' most recent line of art is in the world of fashion which includes large-scale, pure silk scarves.

=== Medical career ===
Plioplys returned to medicine to complete an adult neurology residency at the Mayo Clinic, Rochester, Minnesota (1979-1982). He worked under the supervision of Dr. Jasper Daube—subsequently Chairman, Department of Neurology, Mayo Clinic, and President, American Academy of Neurology. He decided to change from adult neurology to pediatric neurology and undertook a one-year pediatrics residency.

Plioplys then moved to Toronto, Ontario, to work at the Hospital for Sick Children, where he completed Core II level of general pediatrics from 1982 to 1983, and was chief resident of child neurology in the same hospital from 1983 to 1984.

After completing his residency, Plioplys received a Research Fellowship in neuroimmunology (funded by the Medical Research Council of Canada) with R.B. Hawkes in Laval University, Quebec City, from June 1984 to June 1986.

He is board-certified as a neurologist with special competence in child neurology, both in the United States (American Board of Psychiatry and Neurology) and in Canada (Royal College of Physicians of Canada)

After completing his research fellowship, Plioplys became a staff neurologist and neuroscience researcher at the Hospital for Sick Children. Plioplys was an assistant professor in Department of Neurology, University of Toronto. His clinical practice, besides general child neurology, emphasized the evaluation and treatment of children with autism. He pioneered research of immunologic causes of autism and launched an immune system-based treatment program. His research laboratory, located at Surrey Place Center, used neuroimmunologic techniques to investigate brain development and causes of central nervous system disorders in children. Many of his research objectives touched upon potential causes for the development of Alzheimer's disease.

In 1990, Plioplys moved back to Chicago, where he established an Alzheimer's disease research laboratory, where investigated inflammatory components as possible causes of this disease. Also, he established and ran Alzheimer's disease clinics at Michael Reese Hospital and at Mercy Hospital and Medical Center, where investigatory medication trials were evaluated. He was an assistant professor in the Department of Neurology, University of Illinois.

Plioplys spent 20 years working with severely cerebral palsied (CP) children and young adults. He was the medical director of seven pediatric and young adult skilled nursing facilities in Chicago. He pioneered vest-therapy and inhalation-therapy programs to prevent pneumonia in severely CP children. These treatment approaches have become standard treatment modalities in pediatric hospitals and intensive care units across North America.

In addition, Plioplys established Chicago's only Chronic Fatigue Syndrome evaluation and treatment program, which ran for 10 years at Mercy Hospital. This program led to the receipt of over $2 million in research grants, and the publication of 25 research articles and reports.

He was the founder and past chairman of the Pediatric Long-Term Care Section of the American Medical Director's Association. He has been a child neurology examiner for the American Board of Psychiatry and Neurology.

=== Research work ===
Plioplys' research reports have been cited in many publications including the New England Journal of Medicine, the Proceedings of the National Academy of Sciences, and The New York Times. Among his most-cited articles are "Survival rates of children with severe neurologic disabilities (Plioplys, AV, Kasnicka I, Lewis S, Moller D.South Med J. 1998; 91:161-170)", "Intravenous immunoglobulin treatment of children with autism (Plioplys AV. J Child Neurol. 1998; 13:79-82)", "Pulmonary vest therapy in pediatric long-term care (Plioplys AV, Lewis S, Kasnicka I. J Am Med Dir Assoc. 2002; 3:318-21)", "Comparing symptoms of chronic fatigue syndrome in a community-based versus tertiary care sample (Jason LA, Plioplys AV, Torres-Harding S, Corradi K. J Health Psychol. 2003; 8:459-64)", "Nebulized tobramycin: prevention of pneumonias in patients with severe cerebral palsy (Plioplys AV, Kasnicka I. J Pediatr Rehabil Med. 2011; 4:155-8)", and "Life expectancy determinations: cerebral palsy, traumatic brain disorder, and spinal cord; analysis and comparison (Plioplys AV. J Life Care Plan, 2012; 11:25-38)", "Electron-microscopic investigation of muscle mitochondria in chronic fatigue syndrome."

The Audrius V. Plioplys Archive has been established at the Lithuanian Research and Studies Center in Chicago, which houses documentation and examples of his artistic accomplishments and complete files of his work in neurology and neuroscience research, and many other matters. This archive has a set of over 40 original photographic prints made in the 1980s by Juozas Kazlauskas of Siberian deportation sites. This archive also houses his unique collection of Lithuanian Judaica, and the largest Lithuanian numismatic collection in North America.
