= Sheila Singh =

Pediatric neurosurgeon

- Citizenship: Canadian
- Education: McMaster University; McGill University
- Children: 2
- Scientific career
- Fields: Neurobiology, Molecular Genetics, Surgery, Cancer Stem Cell Biology, Biochemistry
- Workplaces: SickKids; McMaster University; Hamilton Health Sciences
- Website: http://sheilasinghlab.ca/

Sheila K. Singh is a Canadian neurosurgeon who is chief pediatric neurosurgeon at McMaster Children's Hospital in Ontario, Canada. She is also Professor of Surgery and Biochemistry, the Division Head of Neurosurgery at Hamilton Health Sciences, the Research Director for McMaster's Division of Neurosurgery, and a scientist/principal investigator appointed to the Stem Cell and Cancer Research Institute at McMaster University.

She holds a Tier 1/ Senior Canada Research Chair in Human Brain Cancer Stem Cell Biology, and is Director of the McMaster Surgeon Scientist Program (SSP), which is a part of McMaster's pre-established Clinical Investigator Program (CIP) that provides research training for surgical residents.

== Education ==
Singh graduated from McGill University in 1994 with a bachelor's degree in neurobiology and molecular genetics, and from McMaster University with an MD in 1997. She subsequently trained in neurosurgery at the University of Toronto from 1997 to 2007 and completed a PhD in the Surgeon Scientist Program (SSP) at McMaster University. In 2006, Singh became certified in neurosurgery by The Royal College of Physicians and Surgeons of Canada (RCPSC) and then did a fellowship in pediatric neurosurgery at SickKids from 2006 to 2007.

She has been recognized by invitations to serve as a grant reviewer for the NIH and CIHR. She has served as a brain tumor expert reviewer for the Pediatric Provincial Oncology Plan and the Pediatric Oncology Group of Ontario. She was a member of the Stem Cell Network AGM Steering Committee of the 2012 Till and McCulloch Meeting. She is active in the European Society for Medical Oncology and is on the editorial boards of Acta Neuropathologica Communications and of Current Pathobiology Reports. She is also a scientific advisor to Arch Biopartners of Toronto.

In 2017, she was named to the Royal Society of Canada's College of New Scholars, Artists, and Scientists. In 2017, she was also made a University Scholar by the President of McMaster University.

While in medical school, Singh encountered two five-year-old boys with brain tumors, both named Christopher. They were treated with the best current therapies of the time, however one flourished and the other died. This left her questioning the outcome, sparking her interest in cancer research.

== Research lab ==
The Sheila Singh Lab research program consists of a team of around 20 undergraduate, graduate and postdoctoral students with Singh as the principal investigator (PI) working at the Stem Cell and Cancer Research Institute in Hamilton. Sheila is the first woman to lead such a program as PI and the first scientist from McMaster to do so.

Singh discovered an abnormal stem cell, the brain tumor initiating cell (BTIC), which may be the key to understanding the formation of brain tumors.

The driving idea in Singh's research is the idea that only a small population of cancer stem cells in a brain tumor are capable of propagating, thus focusing on the rare tumor stem cell and not every cell in the tumor. So Singh's lab focuses on therapies that target the BTIC in hopes that it could better halt the propagation of tumors. Singh's lab focuses on understanding the molecular mechanisms that govern BTIC self-renewal, building upon cell culture techniques used for isolating normal neural stem cells (NSC), applying them to brain tumors and developing a xenograft model to study BTIC activity.

Singh's lab currently studies the regulation of BTIC signaling pathways in medulloblastomas (MB), glioblastomas (GBM), and brain metastases (BM). Singh's lab found that patients that have a higher proportion of BTICs may have shorter survival and a worse prognosis, offering insight into patient prognosis and forming the basis for medical therapies aimed at the BTIC.

On her inspiration for her research, Singh said, "You see a lot of things in pediatric neurosurgery and all of them — good and bad — inspire my research. And every person who works with me has a direct connection to the ‘Why?’ of research. Very often patients and their families will come for a tour of the lab and my people get to meet them. There is a real connection. People in my lab work twice as hard because they have that direct motivation. I began my research career inspired to understand why one brain tumor patient with flourished, while the other with the same disease died. Now, my research program is dedicated to applying a developmental neurobiology approach to the study of human brain tumors. We do this by developing pre-clinical models that recapitulate the human disease. Our ultimate goal is to generate novel, targeted and effective therapies for brain tumor patients."

=== Medulloblastoma ===
Singh's lab found that the poor patient survival associated with medulloblastomas correlates with the increased presence of BTICs. Singh's lab aims to study genes that regulate stem cell signaling pathways in MB patients in order to provide specific and individualized therapies that target BTIC.

==== Current projects ====
- Identify druggable targets that work in combination with Bmi1 inhibition to decrease MB progression and spinal dissemination in our therapy adapted patient-derived xenograft (PDX) model of MB recurrence.
- Describe the role of BPIFB4 as a potent regulator of self-renewal and specific driver of MB relapse.
- Identification of potent chemical compounds that specifically target recurrent MB spinal metastases.
- Elucidate the role of the RNA-binding proteins Msi1 and Msi2 in recurrent MB.
- Determine whether activation of Wnt signaling can decrease MB stem cell self- renewal and tumor progression in our MB patient-derived xenograft (PDX) model.

=== Glioblastoma ===
Singh's lab found that the poor patient survival associated with glioblastomas correlates with the increased frequency of BTICs along with the high degree of intratumoral heterogeneity, which affect the development of treatment in GBM. Singh's lab aims "to identify new therapeutic targets that drive clonal evolution in treatment-refractory GBM, develop novel and empirical immunotherapeutic paradigms, and undertake preclinical evaluation of candidate therapeutic antibodies using our unique in vivo model of human GBM recurrence" with the goal of generating targeted therapies for GBM patients.

==== Current projects ====
- Preclinical development and evaluation of CAR-T cells targeting CD133 (BTIC marker).
- Preclinical development and evaluation of CAR-T cells targeting CD70.
- CRISPR-Cas9 genetic screening to identify targets that act to increase sensitivity of GBM cells to current treatment options.
- Profile the genetic, protein, and immune environment of a large database of matched primary and recurrent GBM patient samples.
- Identification of novel targets in the CD133-negative population of GBM.

=== Brain metastasis ===
Singh's lab has characterized a rare population of tumor-initiating cells from patient BM samples, which they termed BM-initiating cells (BMICs). Using these BMICs, they have generated preclinical patient-derived xenograft (PDX) mouse models of brain metastases, allowing them to perform genomic studies to identify drivers of pre-metastatic and fully metastatic tumor cell states which they hope will allow them to identify druggable targets in order to uncover new therapies that can prevent and/or eradicate BM.

==== Current projects ====
- Identification of novel genes that regulate the formation of brain metastasis.
- Functional genomics to characterization the pre- to micro-metastatic states in brain metastasis.
- Identification of candidate drugs that could target the brain metastatic process, especially those with the potential to translate into the clinic as preventative therapy for primary cancer patients susceptible to brain metastasis.

== Support and grants ==
Singh's lab is supported by the Stem Cell and Cancer Research Institute (SCC-RI), Hamilton Health Sciences, McMaster University, the Brain Tumour Foundation of Canada, Team Kelsey: Brain Tumour Awareness, the Ontario Institute for Cancer Research (OICR), the Brain Canada Foundation, BoxRun, Canadian Cancer Society, American Brain Tumor Association, NSERC CRSNG, Mitacs, CIHR IRSC, Stem Cell Network, The Terry Fox Research Institute (TFRI), Cancer Research Society, Jace Wars, BioCanRx, National Brain Tumor Society, Canada Foundation for Innovation, and Canada Research Chairs.

Singh and her research colleagues won a Terry Fox New Frontiers Program Project Grant from the TFRI in 2016, worth $2.75M over five years.

== Selected publications ==
- Singh, Mohini; Venugopal, Chitra; Tokar, Tomas; McFarlane, Nicole; Subapanditha, Minomi K.; Qazi, Maleeha; Bakhshinyan, David; Vora, Parvez; Murty, Naresh K.; Jurisica, Igor; Singh, Sheila K. (2018-09-01). "Therapeutic Targeting of the Premetastatic Stage in Human Lung-to-Brain Metastasis". Cancer Research. 78 (17): 5124–5134. doi:10.1158/0008-5472.CAN-18-1022. ISSN 0008-5472. PMID 29986997.
- Singh, Sheila K.; Clarke, Ian D.; Terasaki, Mizuhiko; Bonn, Victoria E.; Hawkins, Cynthia; Squire, Jeremy; Dirks, Peter B. (2003-09-15). "Identification of a Cancer Stem Cell in Human Brain Tumors". Cancer Research. 63 (18): 5821–5828. ISSN 0008-5472. PMID 14522905.
- Singh, Sheila K.; Hawkins, Cynthia; Clarke, Ian D.; Squire, Jeremy A.; Bayani, Jane; Hide, Takuichiro; Henkelman, R. Mark; Cusimano, Michael D.; Dirks, Peter B. (2004-11-18). "Identification of human brain tumour initiating cells". Nature. 432 (7015): 396–401. Bibcode:2004Natur.432..396S. doi:10.1038/nature03128. ISSN 1476-4687. PMID 15549107. S2CID 4430962.

== Personal life ==
Her hometown is Dundas, Ontario.

Singh is married to Stevan, an architect, and has two sons.
