= Monica Justice =

American–Canadian developmental geneticist

- Born: Kansas
- Spouse: Thomas G. Crosby (m. 2006)
- Children: One

Academic background
- Education: BSc, Fort Hays State University; PhD, 1987, Kansas State University
- Thesis: Specific locus applications of ethylnitrosourea mutagenesis in the mouse: genetic dissection of the t-region of mouse chromosome 17 and characterization of the enu-induced quaking and brachyury alleles (1987)

Academic work
- Institutions: University of Toronto; Baylor College of Medicine

Monica J. Justice (nee Maxwell) is an American–Canadian developmental geneticist. She is the Canada Research Chair in Mammalian Molecular Genetics at the University of Toronto and Program Head of Genetics and Genome Biology at SickKids Hospital.

== Early life and education ==
Justice was born in western Kansas and was raised on the family farm. Growing up, she attended Quinter High School where she was inducted into the Quinter chapter of the National Honor Society as a junior, and was the graduating class valedictorian. Following high school, Justice enrolled at Fort Hays State University, received her MT(ASCP) from St. Francis Hospital, Wichita, Kansas and began working as a medical technologist at St. Francis Hospital. She worked as a medical technologist for six years before returning to school at Kansas State University for her PhD in developmental genetics. During her doctoral studies, she helped to pioneer chemical mutagenesis approaches in mice. Upon completing her PhD, Justice began a postdoctoral fellowship in the Mammalian Genetics Laboratory at the National Cancer Institute.

== Career ==
Upon completing her fellowship, Justice held faculty positions at Kansas State University, and Oak Ridge National Laboratory. Justice was then recruited by Allan Bradley to join the faculty at Baylor College of Medicine (BCM), Houston, Texas to continue her research in developing high-throughput methods for assigning functions to mammalian genes. As a professor of molecular and human genetics at BCM, she became a co-principal investigator on a project to develop mouse models which would enable scientists to identify the function of protein-coding genes in the mammalian genome. Through a grant, Justice co-identified a mutation in a gene involved in the synthesis of cholesterol which led to the development of new treatments for Rett syndrome.

Justice was recruited to The Hospital for Sick Children as the Program Head of Genetics and Genome Biology, where she was also awarded the position of Canada Research Chair in Mammalian Molecular Genetics at the University of Toronto and Canadian Institutes of Health Research. In 2016, she was elected a Fellow of the American Association for the Advancement of Science for her contributions to mouse genetics.

== Personal life ==
Justice married Robert A. Justice in 1978, and has one daughter. They divorced in 1992. Justice married Thomas Crosby in 2006.
