= Sanford Jackson =

Sanford Jackson may refer to:

- Sanford Jackson (biochemist)
- Sanford Jackson (baseball)
