= The Hospital for Sick Children (Toronto) =

Hospital in Toronto, Ontario, Canada

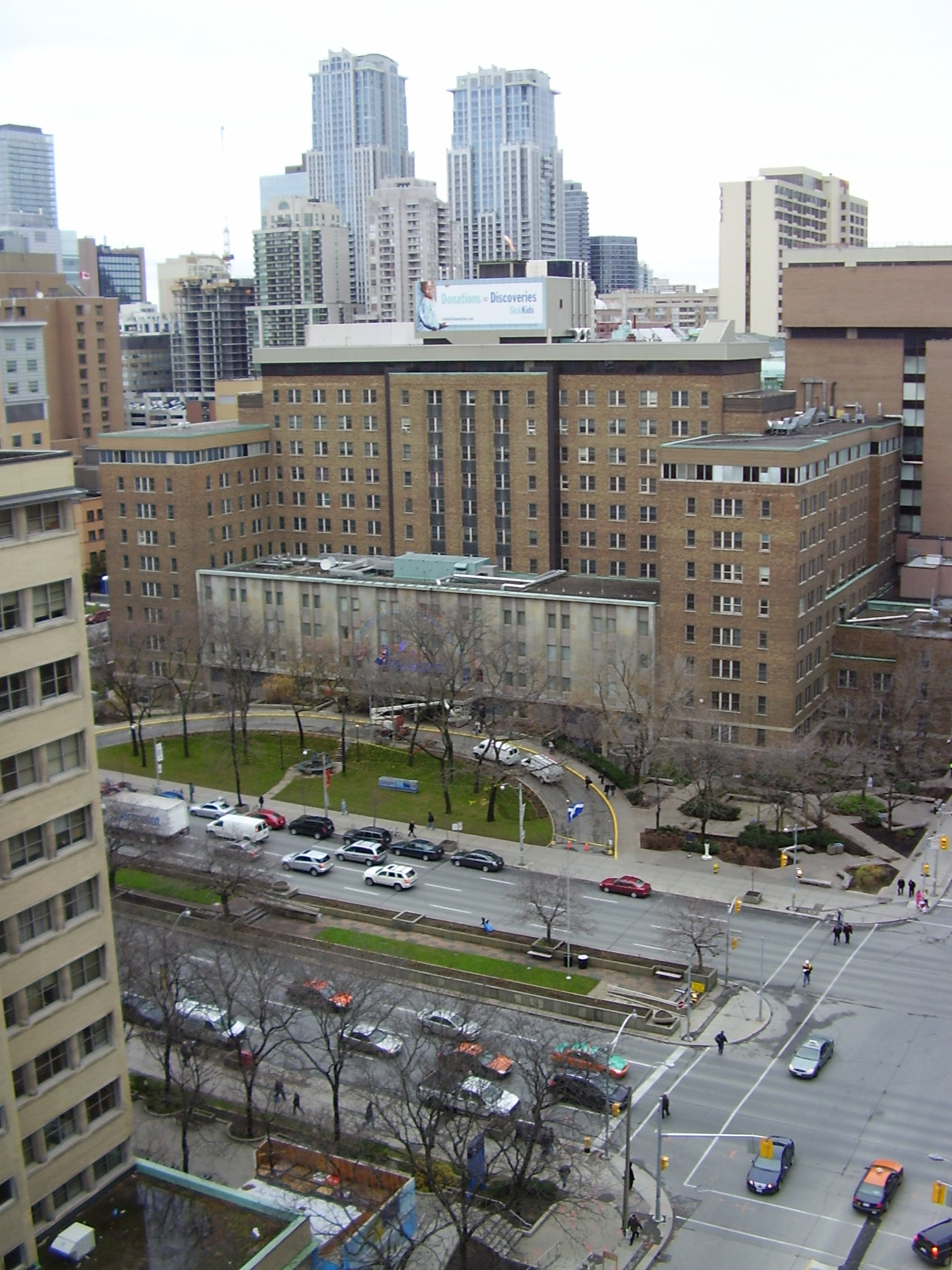
- University Avenue facade

- Location in Toronto

Geography
- Location: 555 University Avenue; Toronto, Ontario; M5G 1X8
- Coordinates: 43.6571°N 79.3885°W

Organisation
- Care system: Medicare
- Type: Specialist
- Affiliated university: University of Toronto
- Network: TAHSN

Services
- Emergency department: Pediatric level I trauma centre (Tertiary)
- Beds: 453
- Speciality: Children's hospital

Helipads
- Helipad: TC LID: CNW8

History
- Founded: 1875

Links
- Website: www.sickkids.ca

The Hospital for Sick Children, corporately branded as SickKids, is a major pediatric teaching hospital located on University Avenue in Toronto, Ontario, Canada. It is fully affiliated with the University of Toronto as a member of the Toronto Academic Health Science Network (TAHSN). The hospital was founded by Elizabeth McMaster in 1875 in a rented room with eleven beds, and later expanded to become a formal hospital, known as the Victoria Hospital for Sick Children, in 1891. In 1951, the hospital moved to its present campus in a nine-storey tower with 572 beds. The hospital's corporate and administrative services are located at the adjacent Patient Support Centre, a 22-storey tower on Elizabeth Street.

The hospital's Peter Gilgan Centre for Research and Learning on Bay Street is the largest pediatric research centre in the world by area; the skyscraper holds 69,677.28 square metres (750,000.0 sq ft). SickKids is credited with a number of inventions, including Pablum, a fortified children's cereal, in 1930. In 1968, the hospital opened North America's first pediatric intensive care unit. In 1989, the hospital discovered the gene responsible for cystic fibrosis. The hospital's research is primarily based in the fields of genetics and oncology. Several of Canada's first surgeries have been performed at SickKids, including the separation of conjoined twins, bone marrow transplantation, multi-organ transplantation, and in-utero cardiac surgery.

The hospital has been ranked as the top pediatric hospital in the world by Newsweek for 2021 and 2026, and has consistently ranked among the top-three in other rankings. As of 2025, SickKids has been embarking on several advancement projects using artificial intelligence, such as Precision Child Health and SickKids AI (SKAI). The hospital's Project Horizon plans for the construction of an additional outpatient services tower and the redevelopment of the current hospital.

== History ==
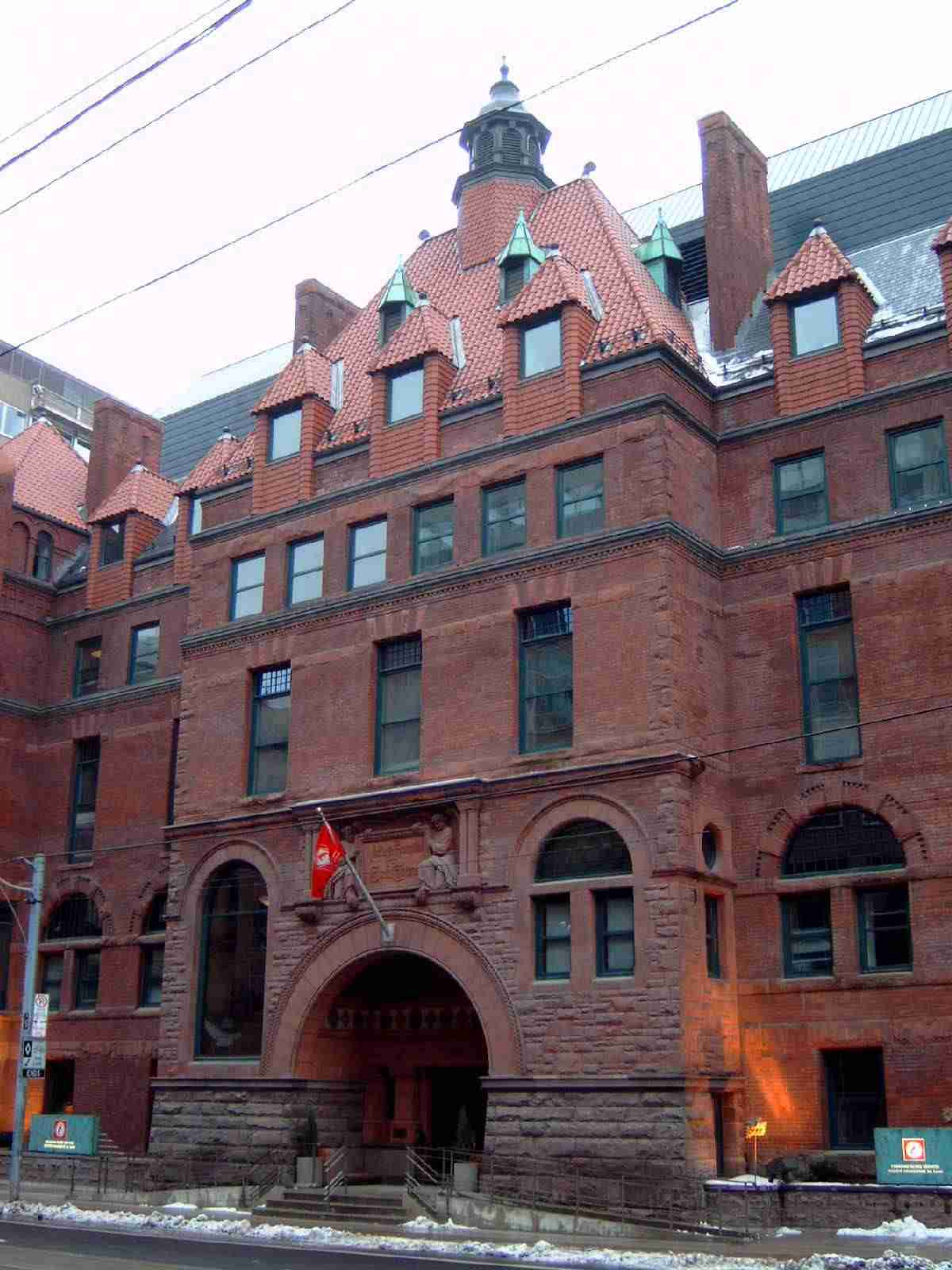
Victoria Hospital for Sick Children

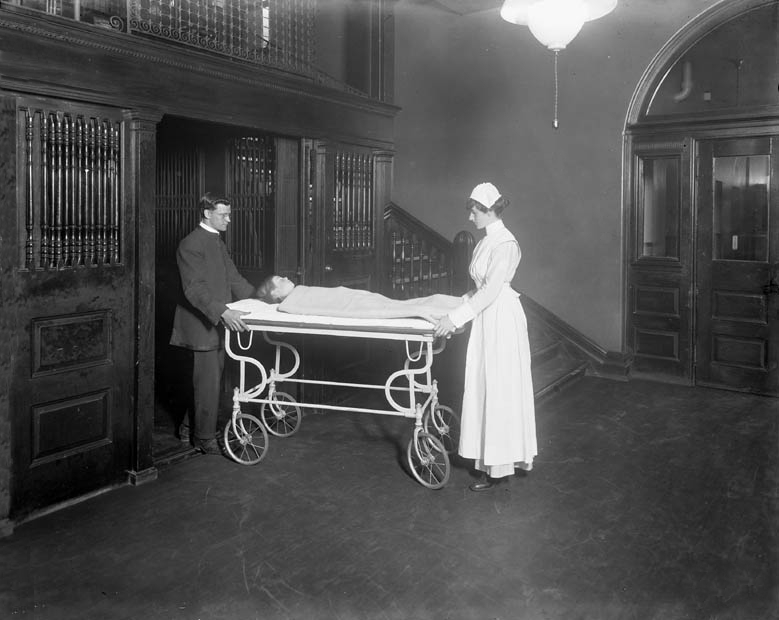
Nurse and orderly transport child to operating room, c. 1915

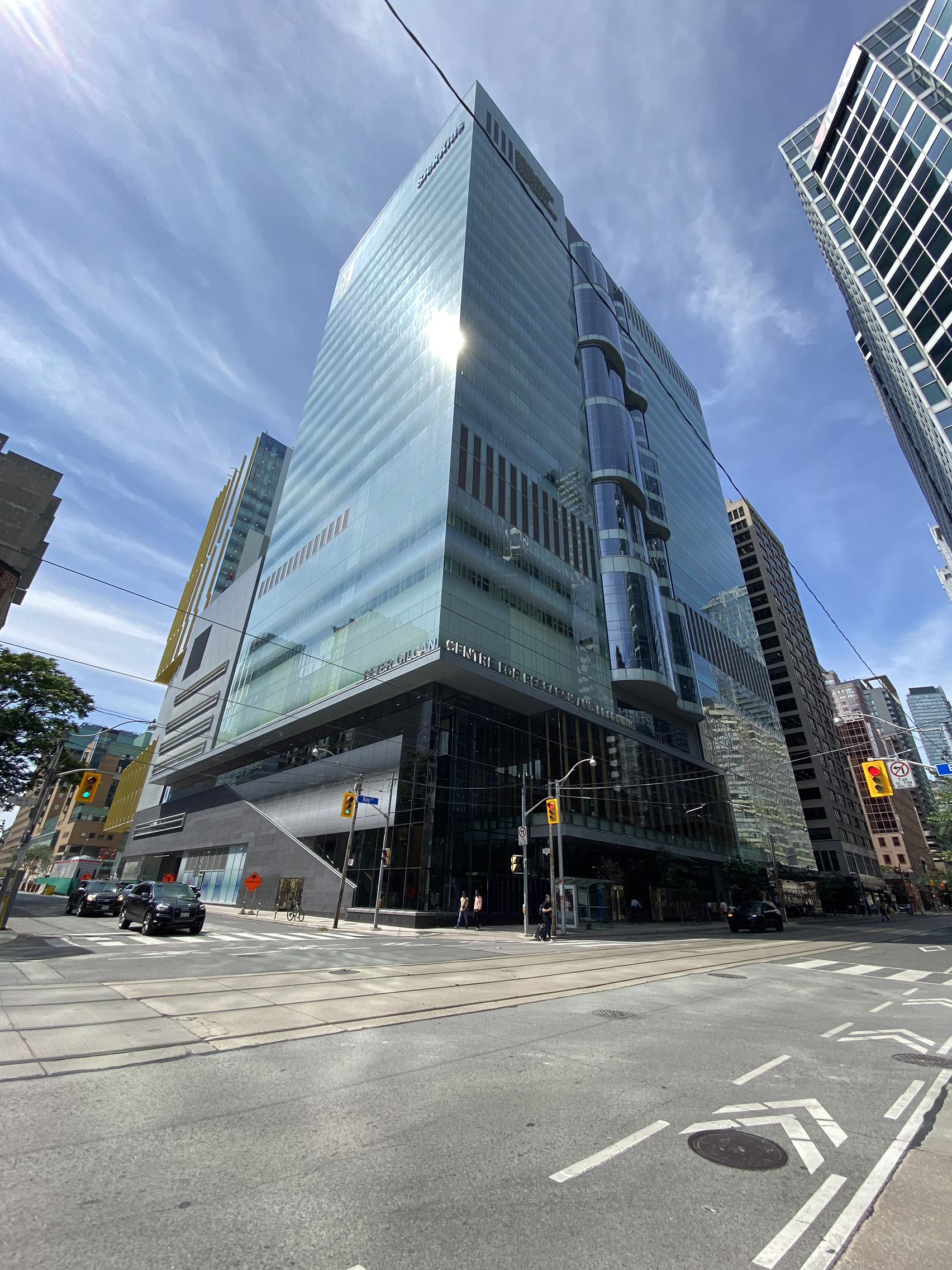
Peter Gilgan Centre for Research and Learning

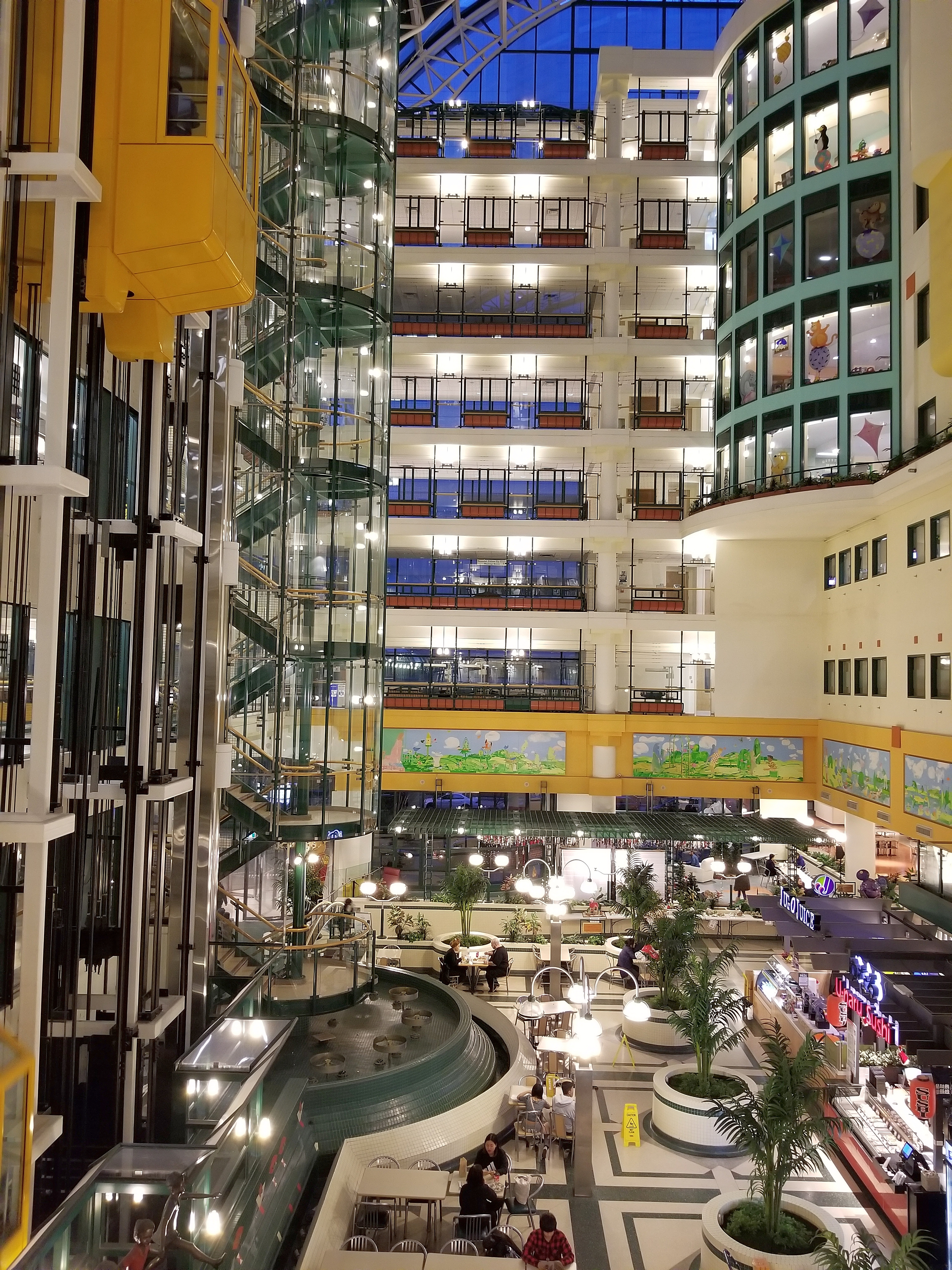
Atrium designed by Eberhard Zeidler

In 1875, an eleven-room house was rented for CA$320 (equivalent to $9,748 in 2025) a year by a Toronto women's bible study group, led by Elizabeth McMaster. Opened on March 1, it set up six iron cots and "declared open a hospital 'for the admission and treatment of all sick children.'" The first patient, a scalding victim named Maggie, came in on April 3. In its first year of operation, 44 patients were admitted to the hospital, and 67 others were treated in outpatient clinics. John Gennings Curtis Adams became the hospital's first dentist of record in 1883.

In 1876, the hospital moved to larger facilities. In 1891, it moved from rented premises to a purposely-built building at College and Elizabeth Streets. It would remain there for 60 years. The building, known as the Victoria Hospital for Sick Children, is now the Toronto area headquarters of Canadian Blood Services. In 1951, the hospital moved to its present University Avenue location. On its grounds once stood the childhood home of the Canadian-born movie star Mary Pickford.

In 1972, the hospital became equipped with a rooftop helipad (CNW8).

From 1980 to 1981, the hospital was the site of a series of baby deaths.

In December 2022, the hospital was attacked by the LockBit ransomware gang, who apologized 13 days later and provided a decryptor to the hospital for free.

== Contributions to medicine ==
The hospital was an early leader in the fields of food safety and nutrition. In 1908, a pasteurization facility for milk was established at the hospital, the first in Toronto, 30 years before milk pasteurization became mandatory. Researchers at the hospital invented an infant cereal, Pablum. The research that led to the discovery of insulin took place at the nearby University of Toronto and was soon applied in the hospital by Gladys Boyd. Dr. Frederick Banting, one of the researchers, had served his internship at the hospital and went on to become an attending physician there. In 1963, William Thornton Mustard developed the Mustard surgical procedure to help correct heart problems in blue baby syndrome. In 1989, a team of researchers at the hospital discovered the gene responsible for cystic fibrosis.

SickKids is a member of the Biotechnology Innovation Organization (BIO), the world's largest advocacy organization representing the biotechnology industry.

=== COVID-19 pandemic ===
During the COVID-19 pandemic, SickKids engaged in several campaigns to promote COVID-19 vaccines.

SickKids received $99,680.00 from the Government of Canada for two projects through a grant program titled "Encouraging vaccine confidence in Canada." The grant was jointly administered by the Natural Sciences and Engineering Research Council (NSERC), the Social Sciences and Humanities Research Council (SSHRC), and the Canadian Institutes of Health Research (CIHR).

One of the funded proposals was titled “Building COVID-19 Vaccine Confidence: Educating the Educators.” The result was a promotional video titled “COVID-19 Vaccination Information for Education & Child Care Sector Staff” narrated by Dr. Danielle Martin. It was produced by 19 to Zero, and distributed by the Ontario Ministry of Education to school boards, private schools, and childcare centres to use in COVID-19 vaccination educational programs.

A second proposal was titled “Stop COVID in Kids - School-based vaccine education outreach to build trust and empower families”, which received additional funding in the form of a $440,000 grant from the Public Health Agency of Canada's Immunization Partnership Fund.

== Alleged baby murders ==
In 1980–81, up to 29 baby deaths at SickKids were suspected to have been deliberately murdered by a nurse using the heart medication digoxin. However, after years of inquiry, it remains unclear if any murders actually took place or if toxicological tests were misinterpreted. In 2024, retired SickKids pediatric intensive care specialist Dr. Desmond Bohn, who took the latter position, pointed to similarities in the British Lucy Letby case.

== Unqualified forensic testing ==
The hospital housed the Motherisk Drug Testing Laboratory. At the request of various child protection agencies, 16,000 hair samples were tested from 2005 to 2015. The former Ontario Appeal Court judge, Susan Lang, reviewed Motherisk Drug Testing Laboratory and determined that it was not qualified to do forensic testing. Lang also stated, "That SickKids failed to exercise meaningful oversight over MDTL's work must be considered in the context of the hospital's experience with Dr. Charles Smith." The 2008 Goudge Report also found that Dr. Charles Smith, whose forensic testimony led to wrongful convictions in the deaths of children, was not qualified to do forensic testing.

== Future ==
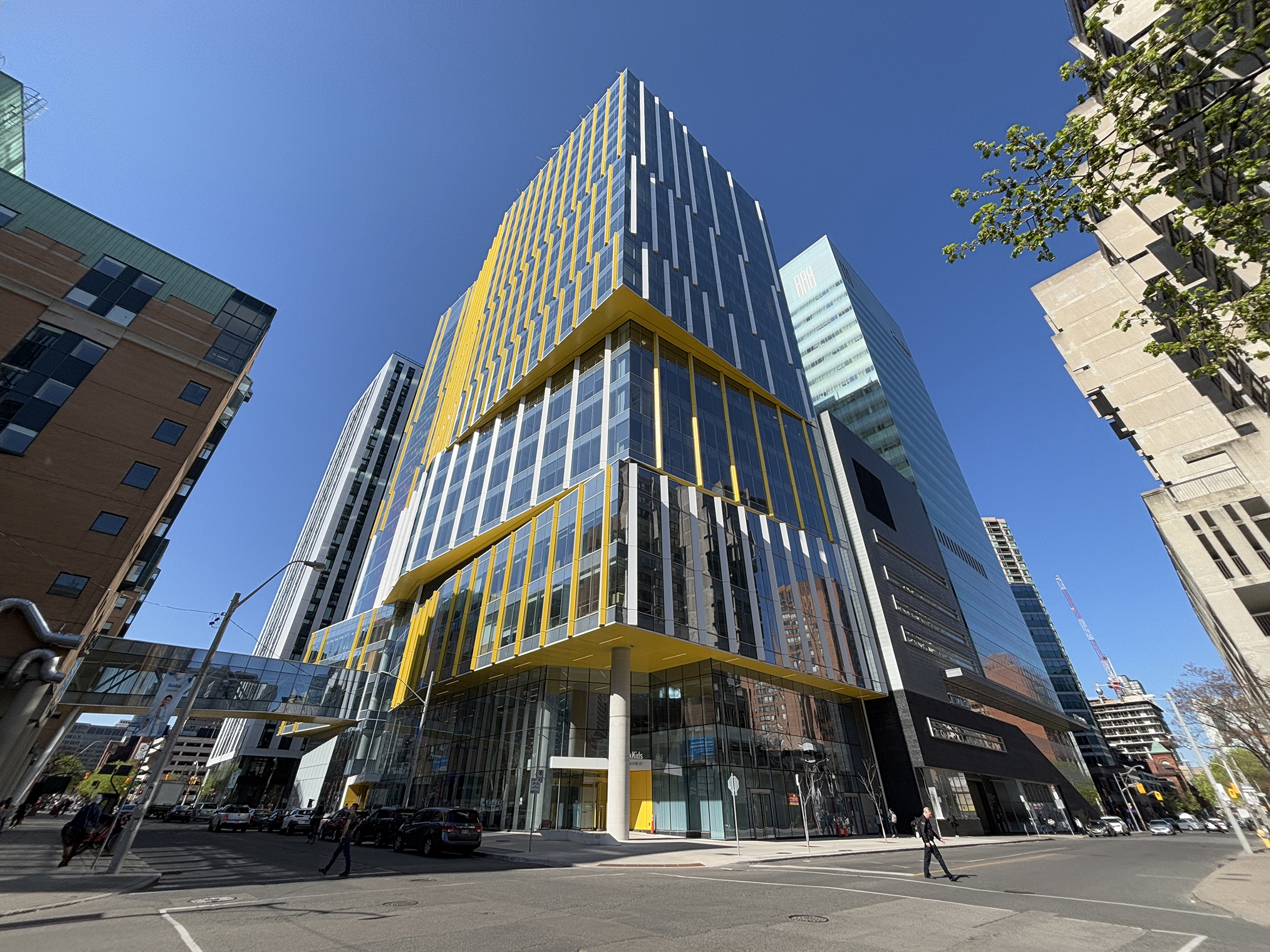
SickKids Patient Support Centre completed in 2023

The hospital is in its initial stages of expansion. In 2017, it established the "SickKids VS Limits" fundraising campaign, which continued until 2022 to raise $1.5 billion for the expansion project. The funds will be used to build a patient care centre on University Avenue and a support centre on Elizabeth Street, to renovate the atrium, and to fund pediatric health research.

To provide the required area for the buildings, demolition of existing structures was required. That included the removal of a skyway spanning Elizabeth Street, the demolition of the Elizabeth McMaster Building at the northeast corner of Elizabeth Street and Elm Street, and the demolition of the laboratory and administrative building.

Construction of the 22-story Patient Support Centre administrative building occurred on the site of the Elizabeth McMaster Building. Groundbreaking took place in October 2019, topping out took place in September 2022, and it opened in September 2023. The Peter Gilgan Family Patient Care Tower is expected to open in 2029, and the atrium's renovation is expected to be completed by 2031.

== Notable patients ==
- Peter Czerwinski (born 1985), competitive eater known as "Furious Pete"; admitted as a teen while battling anorexia
- Mel Hague (1943–2023), author and country singer; admitted at 9 for infantile paralysis (now known as cerebral palsy)
- Morgan Holmes, sociologist; had a clitorectomy at 7
- Peter G. Kavanagh (1953–2016), radio and television producer; was treated for paralytic poliomyelitis in infancy and childhood
- Aqsa Parvez (1991–2007), murder victim; died at the hospital
- Leonard Thompson (1908–1935), the first diabetic patient to be treated with insulin; received treatment as a teen
- Peter Woodcock (1939–2010), a serial killer; was treated extensively throughout his childhood
- Molly Burke (born 1994), Canadian YouTuber, Burke was diagnosed at age four with retinitis pigmentosa, a condition that causes loss of vision.

== Notable staff ==
- Benjamin Alman, professor and head of the division of orthopedic surgery, senior scientist in developmental and stem cell biology
- Jean Augustine (born 1937), member of the Board of Trustees
- Harry Bain (1921–2001), paediatrician (1951–85)
- Frederick Banting (1891–1941), resident surgeon
- Sonia Baxendale, member of the Board of Trustees
- Jalynn Bennett (1943–2015), member of the Board of Directors
- Zulfiqar Bhutta, co-director of the centre for global child health
- Gladys Boyd (1894–1969), paediatrician, head of endocrine services
- Susan Bradley (born 1940), head of the division of child psychiatry and psychiatrist-in-chief
- Manuel Buchwald (born 1940), staff geneticist, scientist, senior scientist, and director of the research institute
- Kevin Chan, emergency physician
- Jim Coutts (1938–2013), member of the board and foundation
- A. Jamie Cuticchia (born 1966), director of bioinformatics
- Arlington Franklin Dungy (YYYY-2016), chief of paedodontics
- John Taylor Fotheringham (1860–1940), staff member
- Julie Forman-Kay, scientist
- Vicky Forster, postdoctoral researcher
- Anna Goldenberg, senior scientist
- William A. Goldie (1873–1950), chief of the infection division
- Camilla Gryski, therapeutic clown
- Mary Jo Haddad, president and CEO for ten years
- Mark Henkelman (YYYY–2024), senior scientist emeritus
- Lisa Houghton, worked at the hospital
- Sanford Jackson, research biochemist and biochemist-in-chief
- Monica Justice, program head of genetics and genome biology
- Lewis E. Kay (born 1961), senior scientist in molecular medicine
- Shaf Keshavjee, became a director of the Toronto lung transplant program in 1997 and later a scientist in 2012
- Gideon Koren (born 1947), doctor
- Arlette Lefebvre (born 1947), child psychiatrist
- Kellie Leitch (born 1970), orthopaedic pediatric surgeon
- James MacCallum (1860–1943), ophthalmologist
- Sabi Marwah (born 1951), board member
- Michael McCain (born 1958), member of the Board of Trustees
- Kathryn McGarry, critical care nurse
- Pleasantine Mill, a cell biologist who worked at the hospital
- Freda Miller, developmental neurobiologist
- Caroline Mulroney (born 1974), board member
- Edward G. Murphy (1921–2020), senior staff member
- Susan Nelles (born c. 1956), nurse accused in 1980-81 baby deaths
- Aideen Nicholson (1927–2019), social worker
- Isaac Odame, staff physician
- Edmund Boyd Osler (1845–1924), trustee
- Blake Papsin (born 1959), otolaryngologist
- Rulan S. Parekh, former senior scientist in child health evaluative sciences and associate chief of clinical research
- Tom Pashby, former senior staff ophthalmologist and sports safety advocate
- Debra Pepler, senior associate scientist
- Audrius V. Plioplys, chief resident of child neurology
- John Russell Reynolds (1828–1896), assistant physician
- Lisa Robinson, former head of the division of nephrology
- Edward S. Rogers III (born 1969), director
- Johanna Rommens, senior scientist emeritus
- Miriam Rossi (1937–2018), pediatrician in the division of adolescent medicine
- James Rutka (born 1956), subspecializes in pediatric neurosurgery
- Robert B. Salter (1924–2010), surgeon
- Bibudhendra Sarkar (born 1935), head of the Division of Biochemistry Research from 1990 to 2002
- Harry Schachter (born 1933), head of the division of biochemistry research
- Chandrakant Shah (born 1936), honorary staff
- Louis Siminovitch (1920–2021), helped establish the department of genetics and became geneticist-in-chief
- Sheila Singh, neurosurgeon
- Charles R. Smith, head forensic pathologist
- Valerie Speirs, professor
- Ambrose Thomas Stanton (1875–1938), house surgeon
- Martin J. Steinbach (1941–2017), senior scientist in the department of ophthalmology
- Anna Taddio (born 1967), adjunct senior scientist and clinical pharmacist
- Kathleen P. Taylor (born 1957), member of the Board of Trustees
- Ahmad Teebi (1949–2010), clinical geneticist
- John M. Thompson (born 1949), vice chairman of the Board of Trustees
- Margaret W. Thompson (1920–2014), genetics researcher
- Richard M. Thomson (born 1933), member of the Board of Directors
- James Thorburn (1830–1905), physician of the boys' home
- Frederick Tisdall (1893–1949), pediatrician
- James Marshall Tory (1930–2013), chairman of the board
- Lap-Chee Tsui (born 1950), member of the Department of Genetics
- Norma Ford Walker (1893–1968), first director of the Department of Genetics
- Prem Watsa (born 1950), member of the Board of Trustees
- Bryan R.G. Williams, held various positions at the hospital
- Ronald Worton (born 1942), director of the diagnostic cytogenetics laboratory
- Stanley Zlotkin, clinical nutritionist
