= Parekh =

Parekh (Indian) is a surname similar to Parikh. It is an Indian surname mainly used in the Hindu and Jains in the states of Gujarat and Rajasthan. It is Baniya and Gaur Brahmin caste. It means assayer in Gujarati, and derives from the Sanskrit word pariksaka ("examiner"). Also, Oswals and Porwal Banias have clans called Parekh.

== Notable people bearing this name include ==
- Asha Parekh, Indian actress in the 1960 and 1970s
- Bhikhu Chhotalal Parekh, Baron Parekh (born 1935), British-Indian political theorist and professor
- Deepak Parekh (born 1944), Indian businessman
- Hasmukhbhai Parekh, Indian entrepreneur, founder of Housing Development Finance Corporation (HDFC)
- Ketan Parekh, businessman convicted of stock manipulation
- Kevan Parekh, CFO of Apple
- Madhukar Parekh, Indian entrepreneur, Chairman of Pidilite Industries
- Manasi Parekh, Indian actress
- Ramesh Parekh, Gujarati poet and lyricist
- Rulan S. Parekh, American-Canadian nephrologist
- Salil Parekh, CEO of Infosys
- Zayne Parekh, Canadian hockey athlete
