= Bibudhendra Sarkar =

Canadian biochemist (born 1935)

Bibudhendra Sarkar Recipient "Order of Canada"
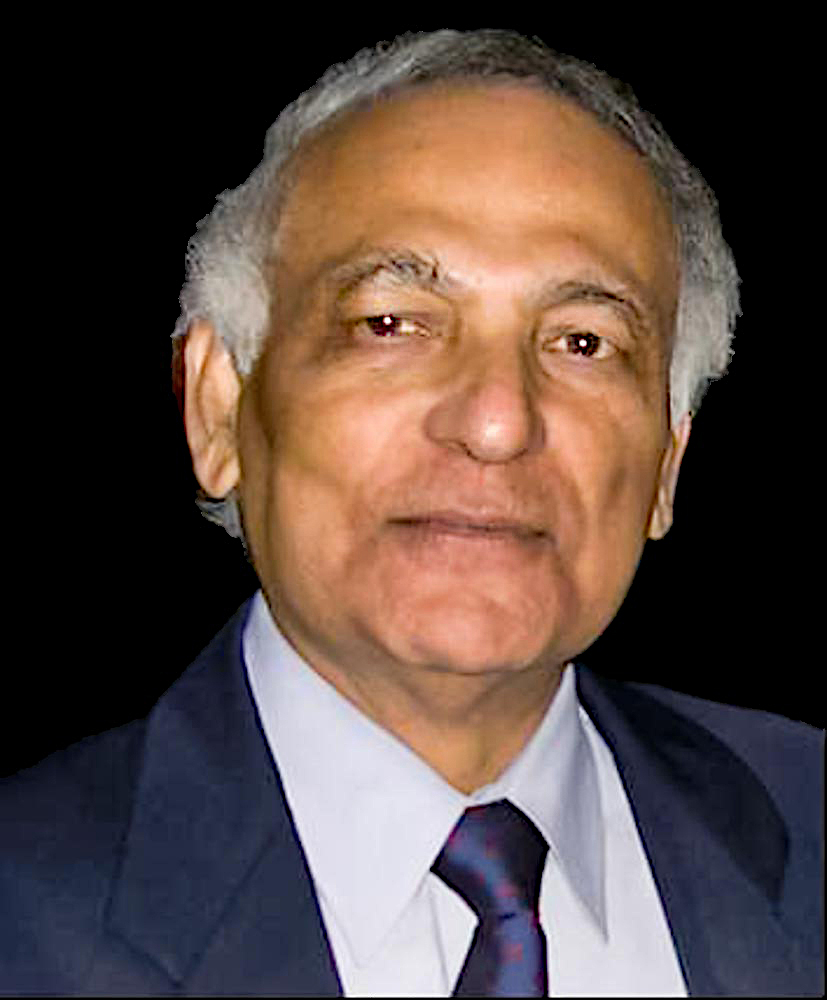
- Born: August 2, 1935 (age 91); Kushtia, Bengal, British India
- Education: Calcutta University; Banaras Hindu University; University of Southern California
- Known for: Inventor of Menkes disease treatment by copper-histidine
- Spouse: Dipti Dutt (d. 1985)
- Children: 2
- Scientific career
- Fields: Biochemistry; Structural Biology; Genetic Diseases; Toxic Metals in Water
- Workplaces: Hospital For Sick Children and University of Toronto
- Thesis: Studies on the transport, metabolism and chemistry of iron-sugar chelates (1964)
- Doctoral advisor: Paul Saltman

Bibudhendra Sarkar CM (born August 2, 1935), commonly known as Amu Sarkar, is an Indian-born Canadian biochemist known for his research on copper-histidine therapy in human blood, which led to one of the first effective treatments for Menkes disease. From 1990 to 2002, he served as head of the Division of Biochemistry Research at the Hospital for Sick Children Research Institute in Toronto. During his tenure, he founded the institute's Department of Structural Biology Research in 1990.

== Early life and education ==
Bibudhendra Sarkar was born on August 2, 1935, in Kushtia, Bengal, British India (now Bangladesh). His father, Surendra Nath Sarkar, was a lawyer, and his mother, Sucheta Sarkar (née Chaki), a homemaker, died when he was one year old. He completed his kindergarten and primary education at Kushtia Mission School, a Catholic institution.

Following the Partition of India in 1947, Sarkar's family relocated to Calcutta after losing their possessions. He attended City College School and later City College, Kolkata, earning his Matriculation and Intermediate Science certifications from the University of Calcutta. He pursued higher education at Banaras Hindu University in Uttar Pradesh, specializing in the chemistry of natural products and earning Bachelor of Pharmacy (B.Pharm) and Master of Pharmacy (M.Pharm) degrees.

During his undergraduate studies, Sarkar worked as a summer researcher at the Central Drug Research Institute in Lucknow, under the mentorship of Manojit Mohan Dhar, who encouraged him to pursue graduate studies abroad. He subsequently moved to the United States, completing a PhD in biochemistry at the University of Southern California in 1964 under the supervision of Paul Saltman. At USC, his work was influenced by chemists Sydney Benson (chemical kinetics), Arthur Adamson (physical chemistry), and Bo Malmström (metal-activated enzyme chemistry).

== Career ==
In early 1964, Sarkar presented his PhD research at the Federation of American Societies for Experimental Biology (FASEB) meeting in Chicago, where he was approached by Andrew Sass-Kortsak, a clinician specializing in Wilson's disease at Toronto's Hospital for Sick Children. Sass-Kortsak, then leading the hospital's Genetic Metabolic Program, sought a basic scientist to join his team and offered Sarkar a staff scientist position. This role included start-up funding and a dedicated laboratory in a newly constructed wing of the hospital. Shortly after, Sarkar received a cross-appointment to the University of Toronto's Department of Biochemistry.

Sarkar began attending clinical Grand Rounds with Sass-Kortsak and visited Wilson's disease patients in hospital wards. His research shifted toward metal-related disorders, driven by his expertise in biophysical studies of metal-protein interactions and metal transport. Collaborating with Sass-Kortsak, Sarkar pioneered multidisciplinary research at SickKids, bridging basic science and clinical medicine to foster a collaborative institutional environment. In 1990, he was appointed head of the Division of Biochemistry Research at SickKids.

== Research ==
Sarkar discovered copper-histidine in human blood. He invented the treatment of Menkes disease by copper-histidine. He discovered the amino terminal Cu (II)- and Ni (II)- binding (ATCUN) motif of proteins. This motif has been used to cleave DNA, applied as a paramagnetic probe, and used to kill Ehrlich cells. His laboratory identified and characterized the six copper-binding sites of copper-ATPase that is defective in Wilson's disease. He pioneered the development of metalloproteomics, a subdiscipline of proteomics that attempts to identify and characterize all metal-associated proteins in a well-defined system. He also contributed to global health research in Bangladesh, India, Nepal, and Myanmar, where tens of thousands of people are exposed to naturally occurring arsenic and other toxic metals in drinking water from underground wells. Sarkar is considered a pioneer in establishing inorganic biochemistry through his research in the early 1960s. He organized the first international meeting of Biological Inorganic Chemistry in the boardroom of the Hospital for Sick Children in 1972. This initiative was followed by the 56th Nobel Symposium in Inorganic Biochemistry held in Sweden under the auspices of the Nobel Foundation in 1982, where Sarkar was an invited speaker. He has published extensively in scientific journals, organized many series of international symposia on metals and genetics, and edited several books on metals in biology, genetics, and environment. He was a founding member of the first editorial board of Metallomics published by the Royal Society of Chemistry.

=== The discovery of copper-histidine in human blood and invention of Menkes disease treatment ===
Sarkar discovered copper-histidine in human blood in 1966 and recognized it as a biological form by which copper, an essential element to sustain life, is transported in blood. In 1976, Sarkar proposed that a baby with Menkes disease receive copper-histidine via subcutaneous injection. This was the world's first Menkes patient to receive copper-histidine therapy. Children with this disease are now living longer and reaching adulthood with copper-histidine treatment. Sarkar did not patent copper-histidine; he intended that it be readily available to Menkes patients at a reasonable cost. The formulation and detailed compounding procedure for the preparation of copper-histidine is freely available by SickKids Pharmacy to physicians and hospital pharmacies around the world upon request. Sarkar also helped make copper-histidine formulation for Menkes disease in other countries, including the NIH Clinical Center, Bethesda, Maryland, USA, India, and Mexico.

=== Molecular structure of Cu(II)-histidine and ATCUN Motif ===
Sarkar solved the structure of the copper(II)-histidine molecule used for the treatment of Menkes disease. He discovered the ATCUN (Amino terminal Cu(II), Ni(II) binding) motif of proteins and peptides.

=== Wilson's disease ATPase ===
Sarkar's laboratory identified six copper-binding sites of Wilson's disease ATPase with all six copper atoms binding ATPase in +1-oxidation state. Based on nuclear magnetic resonance (NMR) studies, Sarkar's team proposed that copper transfer to and between the N-terminal domains of the Wilson ATPase occurs via protein interactions that are facilitated by the flexibility of the linkers and the motional freedom of the domains with respect to each other.

=== Metalloproteomics ===
Sarkar, along with his colleague Eve Roberts, a hepatologist and Wilson's disease specialist, pioneered the development of metalloproteomics. He first presented its concept and findings relating to copper in 2002.

=== Global health research ===
Sarkar led a team of international scientists investigating naturally occurring arsenic and other toxic metals throughout South- and Southeast Asia. In his early research in Bangladesh, Sarkar identified a small child with advanced signs of arsenic poisoning, an observation that motivated extensive research in this region. Discovery Canada Television produced an hour-long documentary focusing on Sarkar's work on this devastating health crisis in Bangladesh. Sarkar's team discovered that arsenic is not the only toxic metal contaminating the groundwater; other toxic metals such as manganese, lead, chromium, and uranium are also present in groundwater. They produced heat maps of arsenic and other toxic metals in Bangladesh and West Bengal (India) groundwater, identifying areas where contamination is of special concern. Their investigation was further extended to the neighboring country of Myanmar (Burma), which has a similar geology, and where they found high concentrations of many of the same toxic metals in groundwater. Sarkar's team also carried out field work in Kathmandu, Nepal, in 2015. In addition, the team called for the WHO to re-evaluate its guidelines for many toxic substances in drinking water based on their health hazards. Sarkar's team stressed that multiple metal contamination of groundwater is an issue of global concern, and the risks may be further magnified by climate change.

=== Inorganic biochemistry ===
Sarkar organized and chaired the first international meeting of Inorganic Biochemistry in the boardroom of SickKids with 35 participants in 1972, which included, among others, R. J. P. Williams (Oxford), Gerhard Schrauzer (University of California, San Diego), David R. Williams (Saint Andrews University, UK), David A Brown (University College Dublin) and Barry Lever (York University). To acknowledge this new discipline the 56th Nobel Symposium introducing Inorganic Biochemistry was held in Sweden under the auspices of the Nobel Foundation in 1982 where Sarkar was an invited speaker. He organized various series of symposia on metals and genetics beginning in 1994 and edited several books on metals in biology, metal-related diseases, and metals in the environment. He was a member of the committee to establish terminology relating to -omics and metals under the auspices of the International Union of Pure and Applied Chemistry (IUPAC).

== Personal life ==
He was married to Dipti Sarkar (née Dutt) (b. 1944 – d. 1985), an Indian classical dancer, choreographer, and historian. He has a son and a daughter.

== Awards and honours ==
- 1964: Blue Key Award: University of Southern California, Los Angeles, USA.
- 1965–1970: Medical Research Scholar Award (Canada).
- 1977: USSR Academy of Sciences invitation to lecture in Academies/Universities in Moscow, Pouschino, Novosibirsk, Tashkent, and Leningrad as a visiting professor.
- 1977: Nuffield Foundation Award, U.K.
- 1977: Member of the High Table, King's College, University of Cambridge, U.K.
- 1981–1982: Chairman: Biological Chemistry Division, Chemical Institute of Canada.
- 1982: Invited to speak at the 56th Nobel Symposium on Inorganic Biochemistry under the auspices of the Nobel Foundation, Sweden.
- 1984 : Visiting Professor : Université de Paris Nord, Paris, France.
- 1986: Elected Fellow of the Chemical Institute of Canada (FCIC).
- 1988: Chinese Academy of Sciences invitation to lecture in Academies/Universities in Beijing, Guiyang and Hangzhou as Visiting Professor.
- 1996: Commencement Speaker, Akdeniz University, Antalya (Turkey).
- 1998: Honorary Professor, Ambedkar Center for Biomedical Research, University of Delhi, New Delhi, India.
- 2000: Visiting Professor (European Union) University of Ioannina, Greece.
- 2002: Visiting Professor, National University of Singapore, Singapore.
- 2003: Research Institute (SickKids) Citizenship Award of the Year.
- 2004: Received R. C. Mehrotra Award for Science from the Vice President of India at the International Conference on Chemistry Biology Interface: Synergistic New Frontiers, New Delhi, India.
- 2005: "Annual Sarkar Lecture" was established in Sarkar's honor to invite distinguished scientists to give lectures in the Research Institute of SickKids.
- 2006: Priyadaranjan Ray Memorial Award from the Indian Chemical Society.
- 2008: Visiting Professor, University of Hong Kong, Hong Kong.
- 2010: Fellow of IUPAC (International Union of Pure and Applied Chemistry).
- 2010: Fellow of the Royal Society of Chemistry, U.K. (FRSC (UK)).
- 2020: Sarkar Symposium, a celebration honoring Sarkar's 55 year career at SickKids.
- 2024: Order of Canada
