= Anna Taddio =

Canadian pediatrician

- Born: 1967 (age 58–59)

Academic background
- Education: BS., MS, 1994, PhD, 1997, University of Toronto
- Thesis: Clinical pharmacology of lidocaine-prilocaine cream in infants. (1997)

Anna Taddio (born 1967) is a Canadian pharmacist. She is a professor in the Leslie Dan Faculty of Pharmacy at the University of Toronto, and adjunct senior scientist and clinical pharmacist at SickKids Hospital.

== Early life and education ==
Taddio was born in 1967. She earned her undergraduate degree, Master's degree, and PhD from the University of Toronto (U of T). While earning her Master's degree, Taddio co-published a study titled Effect of neonatal circumcision on pain responses during vaccination in boys. The result of the study found that pain experienced at birth could have a lasting effect on a child's memory. They concluded this by studying newborns who had circumcisions with and without any numbing medicine and comparing their experiences at future immunizations.

== Career ==
Upon earning her PhD, Taddio co-published Effect of neonatal circumcision on pain response during subsequent routine vaccination with Joel D. Katz. Their study found that boys who were given anesthetic cream during their circumcision experienced less pain during the process than those with a placebo cream. As an assistant professor of pharmacy at U of T and SickKids Hospital pharmacist, she led the first study to look at anticipatory pain responses in newborns. To reach this conclusion, the research team studied how infants who received heel lances over the first 24–36 hours of life (compared to a control group) reacted to a Venipuncture procedure. It was found that the babies who received heel lances had increased pain responses. Her work reached beyond newborns and in 2005, Taddio helped establish a new topical anesthetic in order to reduce pain for children having IVs inserted. She was subsequently awarded the Early Career Award from the Canadian Paediatric Society.

Continuing her work with needles and pain, Taddio led a sucrose study on babies born at Mount Sinai Hospital in 2008 which found that those who received sugar water, or sucrose, had lower pain scores. However, the study did find that there was no significant difference in pain between the newborn and control group when it came to vitamin K injections. In spite of these findings, Taddio said "sugar water works, but it doesn’t work as well as we thought it did...We need to investigate other analgesics or other ways to make it work better." In the same year, Taddio co-founded HELPinKids&Adults (Help ELiminate Pain in Kids & Adults) at SickKids in an effort to reduce pain caused by vaccines. By 2010, they published the first clinical practice guideline on reducing pain during childhood vaccination.

In 2011, Taddio and her research team developed and published an evidence-based practice guideline in order to reduce pain from childhood vaccinations. Upon reviewing 18 studies of 831 patients, they discovered that warming vaccines using water baths, incubators, fluid warmers, baby food warmers, a warming tray, or a syringe warmer could greatly reduce the pain patients feel. As a result of her research, the World Health Organization invited Taddi to their 2015 Strategic Advisory Group of Experts meeting in Geneva and announced they would adopt many of her proposed pain mitigation techniques. She also co-published an updated guideline for healthcare providers in the Canadian Medical Association Journal which included recommendations for all ages. In recognition of her efforts, she was honoured with the Pfizer Research Career Award by the Association of Faculties of Pharmacy of Canada.

By 2018, Taddio was the recipient of a $1 million Canadian Institutes of Health Research (CIHR) grant to continue her work on reducing fear of needles in youth. Using this grant and the assistance of HELPinKids&Adults, she developed the CARD method to relieve the fear of needles. The CARD System (Comfort, Ask, Relax, Distract) is an evidence-based approach which allows patients to select coping strategies during their vaccines. Her subsequently published paper Overview of a Knowledge Translation (KT) Project to improve the vaccination experience at school: The CARD System earned her the 2020 Noni MacDonald Award from the Canadian Paediatric Society.
