= Vicky Forster =

British biologist

- Education: Newcastle University Durham University
- Known for: Paediatric cancer
- Scientific career
- Workplaces: Women's College Hospital, Toronto
- Thesis: AML1/ETO promotes a mutator phenotype in t(8;21) acute myeloid leukaemia (2012)

Victoria Jane (Vicky) Forster is an English cancer researcher and science communicator. As of 2022 she is Patient and Community Engagement Lead at Women's College Hospital in Toronto.

== Education ==
Forster grew up in Chelmsford, Essex. She was diagnosed with acute lymphoblastic leukemia aged 7. She became interested in scientific research whilst at hospital, and went on to study biomedical science at the Durham University. She graduated from Durham University in 2008. Forster completed a PhD at Newcastle University with James Allan and Olaf Heidenreich. On the day she finished her PhD, she tweeted, Dear Cancer, I beat you aged eight and now I’ve got a PhD in cancer research, which became a viral post.

== Career ==
Forster used the media attention to praise where she worked, the Northern Institute for Cancer Research, Newcastle upon Tyne. Here she concentrated on leukemia caused by mutations in DNA.

In 2014 Forster was a British Science Association Media Fellow. That year, she spoke at TEDx Jesmond Dene about the legacy of Janet Rowley. In 2015 she won the Communications and Brand Ambassador Prize from Cancer Research UK. She appeared in the science communication project Soapbox Science. Forster was a 2017 TED Global Fellow researching paediatric cancer. Her TED talk, What can cancer survivors teach us about cancer treatment, was in Arusha, Tanzania. She was listed in the 2017 Forbes 30 Under 30 and was part of the BBC's 100 Women science week. She has written for The Times, The Conversation, Forbes Health and The Guardian. She is a member of the Society of The International Society of Paediatric Oncology.

She completed her post-doc at The Hospital for Sick Children. Her research focussed on the rare genetic disorder biallelic mismatch repair deficiency. She now works at Women's College Hospital, Toronto.
