= Arlington Franklin Dungy =

Dr. Arlington Franklin Dungy
- Born: Windsor, Ontario
- Died: April 30, 2016
- Education: Doctor of Dental Surgery and Diploma in Paediatric Dentistry from University of Toronto, Faculty of Dentistry
- Occupation: Dentist
- Spouse: Susan Barclay
- Children: 2

Arlington Franklin Dungy (born c. 1932-3) was a Canadian dentist and advocate inclusivity in the medical community. Specializing in paediatric dentistry, he began his practice in Toronto before becoming chief of dentistry at the Children’s Hospital of Eastern Ontario in Ottawa. In academia, he held key leadership roles at the University of Ottawa Faculty of Medicine, serving as the dean of alumni and student affairs, and later as associate dean of professional affairs. During his tenure, he co-founded the university’s Indigenous admissions program and established two scholarships aimed at increasing indigenous representation in Canada’s medical profession. He was affectionately known as "Arlie" by those close to him.

== Education ==
Arlington Franklin Dungy attended the University of Toronto, where he obtained his Doctor of Dental Surgery (DDS). Graduating in 1956, he became one of the first known Black graduates from the school's Faculty of Dentistry. He later obtained a specialist diploma in paediatric dentistry in 1970, also from the University of Toronto.

== Career ==
After graduating with his DDS, Dungy had a long professional career in dentistry. He became the chief of paedodontics at Toronto’s Hospital for Sick Children in 1969. Dungy was then recruited as Chief of Dentistry for Ottawa’s Children’s Hospital of Eastern Ontario in 1981. By 1995, he held the position of Vice-President academic research, and medical affairs.

Dungy's academic career spanned 25 years. First as an adjunct professor of surgery at the University of Ottawa Faculty of Medicine, he then went on to help found a student affairs office. He later would hold the positions of associate dean of alumni and student affairs, and associate dean of professional affairs. In 2006, he became the first director of the Indigenous Admissions program at the University of Ottawa's Faculty of Medicine.

== Advocacy work ==
Self-identifying as an African-American, Dungy stated that his own experiences with prejudice in his community facilitated his desire to create a more diverse and inclusive community for other marginalized groups with the field of medicine. He played a key role as part of a small team, that also included Dr. Peter Walker, in founding the Indigenous Admissions program at University of Ottawa Faculty of Medicine.

The Indigenous Admissions program launched in 2006, originally admitting seven students in its first year, and six in its second. The program was funded jointly by both federal and provincial levels of government. The program originally held eight out of 150 places at the medical school for applicants from First Nations, Inuit and Métis backgrounds. Its goal was to graduate more than 100 medical students by 2020 to address a lack of indigenous medical professionals in Canada, and improve Indigenous healthcare on reserves and in cities. Dungy was the first director of this program. He hoped other Canadian medical schools would follow the example of the Indigenous Admission program by setting up similar programs.

Dungy also created two scholarship funds for University of Ottawa medical students. In 1997 he founded the Hilda Rebecca Dungy Memorial Scholarship, to provide financial aid to students from the Faculty of Medicine. Later, upon his retirement, he also created the Dr. Arlington F. Dungy Scholarship for Students in the Faculty of Medicine's Indigenous Program.

== Personal life ==
Dungy was originally from Windsor, Ontario, and also went by the name Arlie. He was married to Susan Barclay and had two children. Dungy died on April 30, 2016, after battling Alzheimer's disease.
