= Miriam Rossi =

American-Canadian pediatrician (1937-2018)

- Born: Miriam Frances Senhouse; January 31, 1937; Boston, Massachusetts, USA
- Died: July 11, 2018 (aged 81); Toronto, Ontario, Canada
- Education: Master's degree (Residency)
- Alma mater: Mount Sinai School of Medicine; McGill University
- Occupation: Pediatrician · Professor
- Spouse: Renato Rossi
- Children: 1

Miriam Rossi (born Miriam Frances Senhouse) (31 January 1937 – 11 July 2018) was emeritus professor of pediatrics at the University of Toronto, and a pediatrician in the division of Adolescent Medicine at the Hospital for Sick Children. She was Associate Dean of Student Affairs & Admissions at the University of Toronto's Faculty of Medicine for 13 years. Rossi is best known for her contributions to diversity and health equity in undergraduate medical education.

== Early life and education ==
Rossi was born in Boston, Massachusetts, US on 31 January 1937. Her mother was from Barbados, and was a designer in the Boston garment industry. Her father was the American-born son of immigrants from Barbados and Canada, and was a post-office supervisor.

Rossi obtained a Bachelors of Science degree in dietetics, and a master's degree in nutrition and biochemistry at the University of Iowa. This was followed by a string of jobs, including being an instructor at a Boston hospital, and a teacher and a public health nutritionist in New York City's public health department in Harlem. She then completed medical school as a member of the first graduating class at the Mount Sinai School of Medicine (now the Icahn School of Medicine at Mount Sinai). She later became a Fellow of the Royal College of Physicians and the American Academy of Pediatrics.

== Research and career ==
Rossi completed her medical residency at McGill University in Canada. In 1973, she followed her husband, Renato Rossi, to Milan, Italy, where she qualified for an Italian medical degree before practicing for a year. In 1981, her husband relocated to Toronto, Ontario. Rossi followed, and joined the Hospital for Sick Children as a pediatrician in the division of adolescent medicine, and a pediatrics professor at the University of Toronto.

In 1988, she was appointed the Associate Dean of Student Affairs & Admissions at the Faculty of Medicine at the University of Toronto.

In 1992, Rossi co-founded the Association for the Advancement of Blacks in Health Sciences, alongside black medical students, Dr. Kristine Whitehead, Dominick Shelton, and Diana Alli D'Souza (a retired University of Toronto administrator). The Association engaged in outreach to high schools in the Greater Toronto Area and launched a Summer Mentorship Program in 1994. Over 900 students have graduated from the program, where almost all have completed post-secondary degrees, and approximately half have also completed a medical degree or professional program in health sciences.

As associate dean, Rossi introduced a multi-step strategy to prevent sexual harassment at the University of Toronto in response to first and fourth-year medical students reporting, through volunteer questionnaires, any verbal, emotional, physical or sexual abuse experienced during their medical education.

From 1990 to 1993, Rossi served on the Presidential Advisory Committee on Race Relations and Anti-racial Initiatives of the University of Toronto. From 1991 to 1998, she served on the Ontario Premier's Council for Health Strategy, from 2004 to 2010, she served on the Trillium Gift of Life Network (Ontario's provincial agency dedicated to organ transplant and donations).

Rossi co-founded the Black Health Alliance and was an advocate in 2010 for the opening of the TAIBU Community Health Care Centre, which provides specialized care for the black community.

She was a founding member of the Black Physicians' Association of Ontario (BPAO). In 2017, BPAO collaborated with the University of Toronto to establish the Miriam Rossi Award for Health Equity in Undergraduate Medical Education.

== Mentorship ==
Rossi has been recognized repeatedly for her commitment to mentorship and student advocacy through awards, and by her peers.

Upon being recognized as one of 100 accomplished Black Canadian Women, Rossi stated:

"I believe the greatest accomplishments during my career in the Health Sciences was (a) to be instrumental in bringing about a change in the admission procedures that allowed a larger number of minority students to enter the field of Health Sciences at the University of Toronto; (b) not second, but equally important, was the founding of the Mentoring Program at the Faculty of Medicine for underachieving minority high school students that allowed more students to gain the confidence to apply and be accepted to programs in Health Sciences at various universities."

== Awards ==
- Ontario Psychological Foundation Community Service Award (1991).
- Harry Jerome Award for Professional Excellence (1997).
- The Vision Award for Excellence in Ongoing Community Education (1999).
- The African Canadian Achievement Award in Health Science (2002).
- The Keeper of the Flame Award (2005).
- Inaugural recipient of the SOSAction Guiding Star Award (2013).
- Recognized as one of the 100 accomplished Black Canadian Women (2016).

== Personal life ==
Rossi was married to Renato Rossi, an engineering executive. She died at the age of 81 on 11 July 2018.
