= Gladys Boyd =

Canadian paediatrician

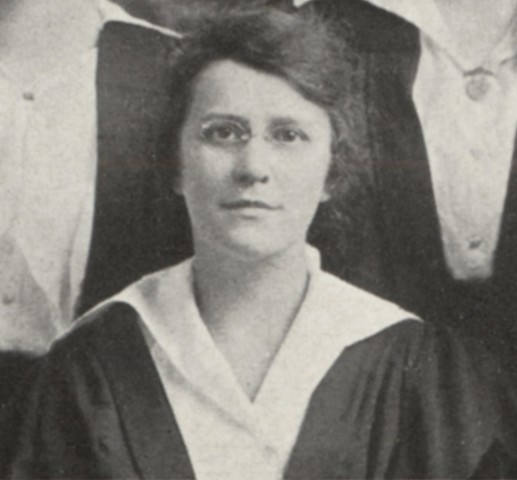
- Boyd in 1918
- Born: December 26, 1893; York, Toronto, Canada
- Died: October 24, 1970 (aged 76); Toronto, Canada
- Education: University of Toronto
- Occupations: Paediatrician and researcher
- Employer: Hospital for Sick Children in Toronto
- Known for: Early demonstration of insulin working
- Children: 1

Gladys Lillian Boyd (December 26, 1893 – October 24, 1970) was a Canadian paediatrician at the Hospital for Sick Children in Toronto. She was a pioneer in the treatment of juvenile diabetes. A collaborator of Sir Frederick Banting, she was one of the first physicians to treat diabetic children with insulin.

== Career ==
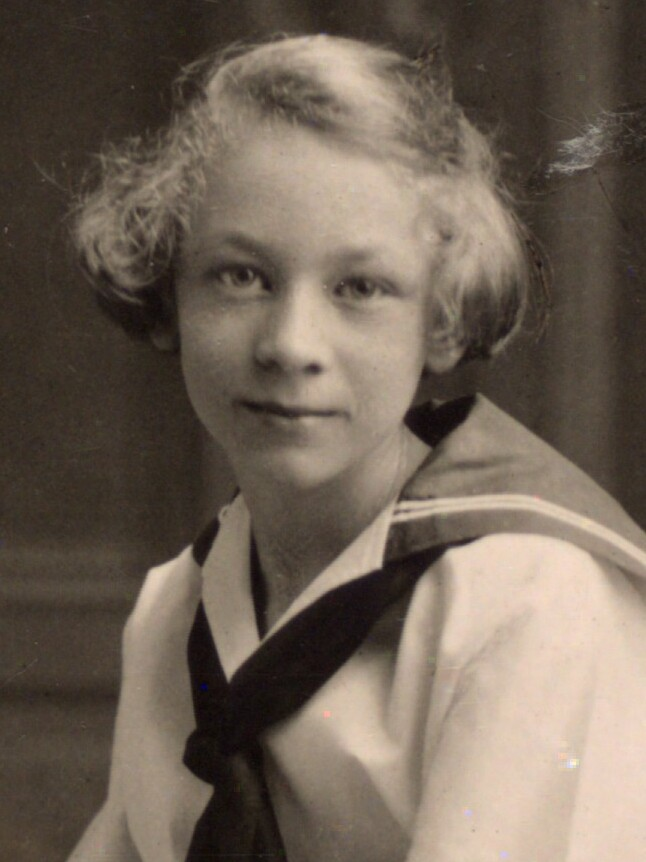
Elsie Needham was the first child to return from a diabetic coma due to insulin.

Boyd graduated as a physician in 1918 from the University of Toronto Faculty of Medicine, where she had been the Undergraduate Medical Women's Council's director. She began a fellowship at the Hospital for Sick Children in Toronto in 1920 and was appointed the director of Endocrine Services in 1921. In that role, she conducted research in the treatment of juvenile diabetes, nephritis and tuberculosis. In 1922, she was appointed Chief of Paediatrics at Women's College Hospital, and was the sole paediatrician at the hospital.

Boyd worked closely with Sir Frederick Banting, whose research team were the first to isolate insulin, and was one of the first doctors to treat diabetic children with insulin. Boyd contacted Banting to get a vial of his new insulin extract in October 1922 to treat her 11-year-old patient, Elsie Needham, who was in a diabetic coma; she made a rapid and remarkable recovery. Elsie Needham was the first child to return from a diabetic coma due to insulin. Boyd presented her research at the inaugural scientific meeting of the Society for the Study of Diseases of Children (now the Canadian Paediatric Society), reporting 20 cases of children with diabetes treated with insulin and concluding that "insulin will probably not cure but arrests the course of the disease".

She was awarded a Doctor of Medicine in 1924 and published the Manual for Diabetics, with an introduction by Banting, in 1925. She was appointed Fellow of the Royal College of Physicians and Surgeons of Canada and the American College of Chest Physicians in 1932, and was elected president of the Federation of Medical Women of Canada in the same year. She remained the head of Endocrine Services at the Hospital for Sick Children until 1950.

== Personal life ==
Boyd was born in York, Toronto to parents Edward John Boyd and Lillian Adair. She never married, and adopted a newborn daughter in 1932. Despite her career, she was never financially well-off, and was unable to own a home partly due to being an unmarried mother. She died in Toronto on October 24, 1970.
