= Benjamin Alman =

American orthopaedic clinician-scientist

Ben Alman
- Born: Philadelphia, Pennsylvania, U.S.
- Education: University of Pennsylvania; Jefferson Medical School; Tufts University
- Website: sites.duke.edu/almanlab

Benjamin Aaron Alman is an American orthopaedic clinician-scientist and currently Chair of Orthopaedic Surgery at Duke University School of Medicine (Durham, North Carolina). Alman is the Distinguished James R. Urbaniak, MD, Professor of Orthopaedic Surgery and also holds appointments with the Department of Cell Biology, Pediatrics, and Pathology at Duke University. Among Alman's other appointments, he is co-director of the Regeneration Next Initiative at Duke University.

== Previous appointments ==
Prior to Duke, Alman was the A. J. Latner professor and Head of the division of Orthopedic surgery at the Hospital for Sick Children in Toronto, Ontario, senior scientist in developmental and stem cell biology at Sick Kids, and vice chair of the department of surgery at the University of Toronto.

== Research ==
Alman's research specialty is the pathology of the musculoskeletal system.
