= Manuel Buchwald =

Canadian geneticist and academic

- Born: June 7, 1940 (age 86); Lima, Peru
- Education: Dartmouth College, Brandeis University
- Known for: Cystic fibrosis research
- Awards: Order of Canada; 125th Anniversary of the Confederation of Canada Medal
- Scientific career
- Fields: Genetics
- Workplaces: Hospital for Sick Children, Toronto; University of Toronto

Manuel Buchwald, OC FRSC (born June 7, 1940) is a Canadian geneticist and academic.

Born in Lima, Peru, he received a Bachelor of Arts degree summa cum laude in 1962 from Dartmouth College and a Ph.D. in 1967 from Brandeis University. He was a member of Phi Beta Kappa society.

In 1971, he joined the Hospital for Sick Children as a staff geneticist. In 1970, he was appointed scientist and in 1980 became a senior scientist. In 1996, he was appointed senior scientist and director of the Hospital for Sick Children's Research Institute. He also holds the Lombard Insurance Chair in Pediatric Research. His research interests are human molecular genetics, Fanconi anemia, cystic fibrosis and gene cloning and function. From 1973 to 1977, he was an assistant professor at the University of Toronto and was an associate professor from 1977 to 1986.

He is part of the team which holds the United States patent for "Methods of detecting cystic fibrosis gene by nucleic acid hybridization" , filed in 1995.

In 1991, he was made an officer of the Order of Canada for "major molecular biological thrust into cystic fibrosis research". In 1992, he was awarded the 125th Anniversary of the Confederation of Canada Medal. In 1994, he was made a fellow of the Royal Society of Canada. He is a fellow of the Canadian Academy of Health Sciences.
