= Bryan Williams (molecular biologist) =

New Zealand molecular biologist

Bryan Raymond George Williams
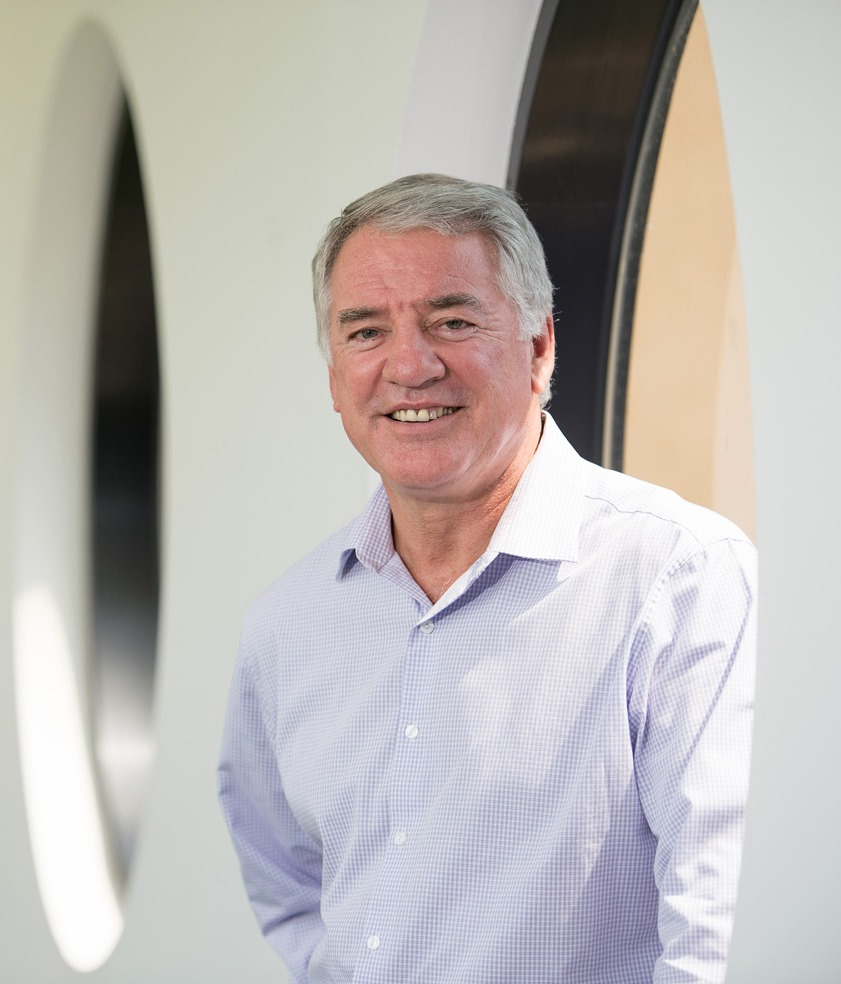
- Professor Bryan Williams
- Born: 1949 (age 76–77); Mosgiel, New Zealand
- Education: The Taieri High School, Mosgiel, New Zealand; University of Otago
- Medical career
- Field: Molecular biology
- Institutions: Hudson Institute of Medical Research Monash University

Bryan Raymond George Williams Hon. FRSNZ, FAA (born 1949) is a molecular biologist from New Zealand, with expertise in innate immunity and cancer biology. He is emeritus director and distinguished scientist at the Hudson Institute of Medical Research in Melbourne, Australia, and professor in the Department of Molecular and Translational Science at Monash University.

== Background and early career ==
Williams graduated in 1973, from the University of Otago, New Zealand, with a Bachelor of Science (Honours) in microbiology. He was awarded his PhD from the department of microbiology, University of Otago in 1976. He then moved to the UK to undertake postdoctoral training at the National Institute for Medical Research in Mill Hill, London, where he worked on the biochemistry of interferon action.

== Research career ==
In 1980, Williams relocated to Toronto, Canada, where he held positions at the Hospital for Sick Children and the University of Toronto. He continued to work on the mechanisms of interferon action and reported the sequence of the interferon-induced protein kinase R. He also worked on the characterisation of the Wilms tumour gene. He was recruited to the Lerner Research Institute at the Cleveland Clinic in Ohio, USA in 1991, where he led the Department of Cancer Biology until 2005. In 2003, the Williams research group published a highly cited paper on the innate immune stimulatory activities of small interfering RNAs, which has had important implications for the therapeutic development of small interfering RNAs.

In January 2006, Williams was appointed as the director of the Monash Institute of Medical Research in Melbourne, Australia, where he established the Centre for Cancer Research. Following the merger of the Monash Institute of Medical Research with Prince Henry's Institute in 2014, he was appointed director and CEO of the new organisation, which was renamed the Hudson Institute of Medical Research in 2015. His current research remains focused on cell signalling in innate immunity and cancer.

== Appointments ==
From 2006 to 2013, Williams served as chair of the board of directors of MEI Pharma, a cancer therapy company. He was a member of the Consultative Council of the Victorian Cancer Agency (2009–2012) and served on the board of directors of Cancer Trials Australia (2009–2015).

Williams currently serves as chair of the board of BioGrid Australia Ltd, and is a member of the board of directors of Pacific Edge Ltd, a cancer diagnostics company. He is a member of the board of trustees of the Hope Funds for Cancer Research (Newport, Rhode Island, USA) and is chair of the selection panel for the Premier's Award for Health and Medical Research, Victoria.

He is currently an editor of Journal of Virology (2013–2018) and was chair of the publications committee of the International Cytokine and Interferon Society from 2010 to 2016.

== Awards and honours ==
- 1990: Milstein Award, International Society for Interferon Research
- 1997: Honorary Fellow of the Royal Society of New Zealand
- 1998–1999: President of the International Society for Interferon and Cytokine Research
- 2005: Maurice Saltzman Award, The Mt Sinai Health Care Foundation
- 2006: Dolph Adams Award, Journal of Leukocyte Biology
- 2008: Boltzmann Award, International Society for Interferon and Cytokine Research
- 2013: Fellow of the American Academy of Microbiology
- 2013: Fellow of the Australian Academy of Science
