= Stanley Zlotkin =

Canadian academic

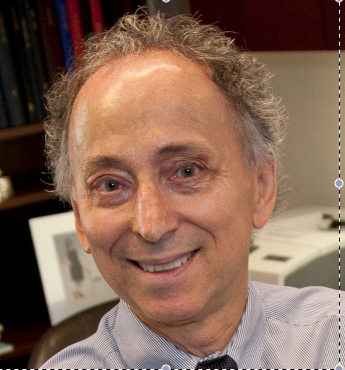
- Education: Doctor of Medicine; Doctor of Philosophy
- Medical career
- Profession: Professor
- Field: Paediatrics
- Institutions: Hospital for Sick Children; University of Toronto
- Sub-specialties: Paediatrics; Public Health Sciences; Nutritional Science
- Research: Micronutrient malnutrition
- Awards: H J Heinz Humanitarian Award; CIHR National Knowledge Translation Award; Ashoka Fellowship

Stanley Howard Zlotkin, CM OOnt is a Canadian Professor of Paediatrics, Public Health Sciences and Nutritional Sciences at the University of Toronto.

== Life and career ==
Zlotkin holds an undergraduate degree in ecology from the University of Toronto, a M.D. from McMaster University (Hamilton, Ontario), and a Ph.D. in Nutritional Sciences from the University of Toronto. He also received a Paediatric Fellowship (FRCPC) from McGill University. As part of his career as a clinical nutritionist at Toronto's Hospital for Sick Children (SickKids), Zlotkin was Head of the multi-faceted Division of Gastroenterology, Hepatology and Nutrition for two five-year terms between 1998 and 2008, and was followed in July 2008 by Dr. Anne Griffiths. Zlotkin is currently head of SickKids' Centre for Global Child Health.

== Achievements and honours ==
Zlotkin is a frequent consultant to governments and United Nations agencies on issues related to paediatric nutrition.

He received the H J Heinz Humanitarian Award in 2001 for his international contribution to the health of children globally, The Canadian Institutes of Health Research (CIHR) awarded him the CIHR National Knowledge Translation Award in 2006 for "outstanding contributions to the health of children worldwide". In 2006 was awarded the Order of Canada for his contributions to improving the lives of children, including his work on Sprinkles, a nutrient-packed powder that mothers around the world add to baby food to prevent anemia and other ailments. In 2007 he received the International Ashoka Fellowship. In January 2016, he was awarded Order of Ontario.

== Research interests ==
His research interests involve:

- Examining mineral requirements and metabolism in premature and full-term infants, especially iron.
- Clinical trials to treat and prevent iron and vitamin A deficiency.
- Establishing evidence-based nutrition public policy.

He has active research in Canada (supported by Health Canada and the CDC), Ghana (supported by the CIHR), Mongolia (supported by World Vision and the H J Heinz Foundation) and India (supported by the CIHR). He is the inaugural Chief of the Centre for Global Child Heath at The Hospital for Sick Children (SickKids) in Toronto.
