= Elizabeth McMaster =

Canadian humanitarian

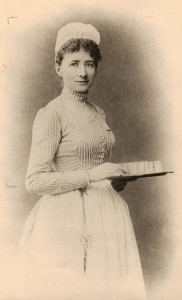
- Born: December 27, 1847; Elizabeth Jennet Wyllie
- Died: March 27, 1903 (aged 55); Chicago, Illinois, US
- Education: Illinois Training School for Nurses
- Employer: Good Samaritan Hospital (Los Angeles)

Elizabeth McMaster (née Wyllie, December 27, 1847 – March 3, 1903) was a Canadian philanthropist and head of the committee which founded the Hospital for Sick Children in Toronto.

== Early life ==
Elizabeth was born in 1847 to parents George Black Wyllie and Mary Ann Reid, an Anglican family who immigrated to Canada from Scotland. In 1865, she married Samuel Fenton McMaster, who was the nephew of William McMaster, founder of McMaster University.

In 1866, Elizabeth and Samuel were baptised into the Bond Street Baptist Church. Elizabeth was a member of the Ladies Bible Association and supported the Toronto Home for Incurables.

== Career ==
In her forties and after her husband's death in 1888, she trained to become a nurse in Chicago, studying at Illinois Training School for Nurses, which merged in 1926 into the University of Chicago's School of Nursing and ceased to exist in 1929.

Graduating in 1891, McMaster left Chicago to work at the Hospital of the Good Samaritan in Los Angeles and Children's Home, an orphanage in Schenectady, New York. She later returned to Chicago, where she died in 1903.

The Great Ormond Street Hospital in London, England was the inspiration for her to found the Hospital for Sick Children in Toronto.
