= Blake Papsin =

Canadian otolaryngologist

Blake Croll Papsin, FACS (born 1959) is a Canadian otolaryngologist who has worked at the Hospital for Sick Children since 1996. Following his graduation from the University of Toronto Faculty of Medicine, he worked at Mount Sinai Hospital as an associate professor, and following surgical training in cochlear implants, he became known for implantation of those techniques. In 2014 he led the team that discovered that putting infants too close to an improperly used white noise machine could put infants at a high risk of developing hearing loss.
