= Valerie Speirs =

Professor of experimental pathology & oncology

Valerie Speirs FRCPath
- Education: University of Aberdeen (BSc); University of Glasgow (PhD)
- Scientific career
- Fields: Cancer biology Breast cancer Molecular pathology
- Workplaces: University of Aberdeen; University of Leeds; University of Liverpool; University of Hull; The Hospital for Sick Children
- Thesis: The role of fibroblasts in the differentiation of human non-small cell lung carcinoma (1989)
- Doctoral advisor: Ian Freshney
- Website: www.abdn.ac.uk/ims/research/cell-cancer-biology/profiles/valerie.speirs

Valerie Speirs is a Professor of Molecular Oncology at the University of Aberdeen. Her research aims to identify biomarkers of breast cancer to inform diagnosis and treatment.

== Education ==
Speirs studied zoology at the University of Aberdeen. She completed her graduate studies at the University of Glasgow. She worked with Ian Freshney on cell culture and became interested in how cell culture systems can be used to model disease.

== Career and research ==
Speirs research investigates Cancer biology, Breast cancer and Molecular pathology.

Speirs joined The Hospital for Sick Children. Speirs worked at the University of Hull on the expression of oestrogen receptor mRNA. She looked at the role of the CGA gene in endocrine response.

Speirs was a member of the Breast Cancer Campaign Scientific Advisory Board in 2008. She joined the Irish Health Research Board in 2009. She served as principal investigator of the Leeds Breast Cancer Campaign Tissue Bank. She oversaw the launch of the tissue bank with the cancer research community in 2012. The tissue bank was a founding member of the Breast Cancer Now tissue bank.

Speirs joined the University of Leeds in 2012. Since then she has been a member of the Sloane Project steering group, a five-year study of 1,000 women. As lead of the St James's University Hospital Institute of Cancer & Pathology, Speirs looked to transfer lab-based molecular pathology techniques into the clinic for the identification of breast carcinoma in men and women. She serves on the advisory group of the National Cancer Research Institute biomarkers advisory group. She studies oestrogen receptor biology and endocrine resistant breast cancer. She has looked to identify the biomarkers for male breast cancer, finding that the androgen receptor biomarker had prognostic significance. She found that male breast cancers over-express eukaryotic initiation factors. She developed a series of resources to educate nurses in observing breast cancer.

In 2016 Speirs launched the virtual resource Sharing Experimental Animal Resources: Coordinating Holdings in Breast Cancer (SEARCHBreast), a platform to share materials that are surplus to animal studies of breast cancer. The project was part of a NC3R grant to develop smart approaches to reduce animal use in science. The resources are available for the characterisation of tumour biomarkers and to investigate the effect of treatment. In 2018 Speirs joined the University of Aberdeen. She holds a visiting lectureship at the University of Leeds. She is a member of the Cellular Molecular Pathology initiative of National Cancer Research Institute. She is working with James Boyne at the University of Bradford on miRNA using blood and breast cancer tissues from the Breast Cancer Tissue Bank. They will investigate how endocrine disrupting agents modulate the activity of fibroblasts in high and low mammographic density breast tissue. They use a 3D in vitro model of the human mammary gland. By identifying how oestrogen mimics effect human fibroblasts from areas of different breast density it will be possible to identify how the drives breast cancer development. She has published extensively on breast cancer and has a h-index of over 40. She is associate editor for BMC Cancer.

=== Awards and honours ===
Speirs was elected a Fellow of the Royal College of Pathologists (FRCPath) in 2007.
