= Isaac Odame =

Ghanaian physician

Professor Isaac Odame FRCPC FRCPath FRCPCH
- Known for: World-Renowned Sickle Cell Disease Specialist
- Scientific career
- Fields: Sickle Cell disease; Thalassemia; Hematological disorders
- Workplaces: University of Toronto; The Hospital for Sick Children

Isaac Odame is a Ghanaian academic and physician who specialises in sickle cell disease. He is a professor of Hematology and Oncology at the Paediatrics department of the University of Toronto. He holds the Alexandra Yeo Chair in Hematology at the University of Toronto. He is the Director of the Hematology Division of the university's Department of Medicine. He is a staff physician of The Hospital for Sick Children, where he serves as the medical director of the Global Sickle Cell Disease Network located at the Centre for Global Child Health. He is a founder of the Global Sickle Cell Disease Network.

== Education ==
Odame had his secondary education at the Accra Academy. He continued at the University of Ghana, where he graduated (MB BCh) in 1982. He obtained membership of the Royal College of Physicians in 1991.

== Career ==
Odame moved to Canada in 2000 to further his work as a medical recruit of McMaster University. After six years of service at the Health Sciences Centre in Hamilton, Odame joined the Hospital for Sick Children in Toronto.

Odame is a member of the Royal College of Physicians, a fellow of the Royal College of Pathologists, a fellow of the Royal College of Paediatrics and Child Health, and a fellow of the Royal College of Physicians of Canada.

== Research interests ==
Odame's research and clinical works are in the field of sickle cell disease, thalassemia and other hematological disorders. His work at the Centre for Global Child Health also focuses on creating a continuous partnership between clinicians and scientists globally to foster academic research and improve medical care especially in developing countries with the largest disease burden.
