= Mel Hague =

English country music singer and author (1943–2023)

Mel Hague (20 January 1943 – 15 January 2023) was an English country music singer and author.

== Early life ==
Hague's parents realised something was wrong with their son when he was 12 months old and still unable to sit up unaided. After visiting many specialists he was diagnosed with "infantile paralysis" though his condition is now known to be cerebral palsy. With the help of a toy railway engine made by his father, Hague learned to walk when he was three and half years old. At nine years of age, Hague went to Canada with his parents, where he received treatment at the Toronto's Hospital for Sick Children. The treatment was not successful, and the family returned to England after two and half years. Unable to settle, they returned to Canada, where they lived for about six years.

In his teens, while at school in Oakville, Ontario, Hague took part in and won a mock election to "replace" the local mayor. It was at this time he discovered an ability to entertain people. Another achievement while in Canada was when Hague's father taught him to drive.

== Music career ==
On his return to England at the age of 18, Hague soon started singing with various bands. At this stage it was mostly rock and roll with some country and western. He decided that the latter was his main interest. In 1964 he formed his own country trio called The Westernaires. In 1966, Hague turned professional and made his first recording, called "Mule Train", and married Ivy. They now have two children.

"Mule Train" carried three tracks: the title song, a Hank Williams song and a self-penned song called "Don't Say a Word". Since then Hague has made 15 albums and a video. He has won numerous music and song writing awards at both club and national level. His most important award was as Country Music Entertainer of the Year in the 1981 Aria/Daily Mirror Golden Guitar Awards. In his act he covered Hank Williams, Johnny Cash, Jim Reeves, Don Williams, Waylon Jennings, Bobby Bare, Randy Travis, Alan Jackson, Confederate Railroad, The Tractors and The Mavericks.

Hague's last public performance was on 9 July 2004. He was suffering from pain through the gig and in the following days things got worse. He was diagnosed as having a problem with four of his intervertebral discs. He was told that it would be a long road to recovery, so he decided to retire from musical performance. Doctors were not confident that he would walk again given his cerebral palsy, but he has made significant progress and is now able to get around using walking sticks.

== Writing and broadcasting ==
Hague spent ten years with BBC Radio Sheffield presenting a weekly one-hour country music programme. He was with Great Yorkshire Radio for a year, presenting a weekly three-hour show.

Hague was also a journalist and contributed to the Country Music Round Up, a weekly column for the South Yorkshire Times which ran for two years, and CD and book reviews for The New Entertainer in Doncaster, as well as a fortnightly column for the Doncaster Free Press. He also wrote book reviews for The Goole Courier, and CD reviews for Traditional Music Maker and Country Music & Dance in Scotland along with X Country.

In 1998, he set out to realise a lifelong ambition to become a novelist and has since written three westerns, To Hell with the Badge, Death on a Rope and Twisted River, and a horror novel, The Grey Man.

== Bibliography ==
- Hague, Mel (2005). Death on a Rope. Paul Mould. ISBN 9781904959274.
- Hague, Mel (2006). To Hell with the Badge. Empire Pub. Service. ISBN 9781586900250.
- Hague, Mel (2004). Twisted River. Paul Mould. ISBN 9780952870883.
- Hague, Mel (2010). Emporium of Death. AEG Literary Publishing Services, Incorporated. ISBN 9781609117757.
- Hague, Mel (2004). Grey Man. Paul Mould. ISBN 9781904959014.
