= Chandrakant Shah =

Canadian doctor, researcher, and social activist

- Born: April 7, 1936 (age 90); Nandurbar, India
- Education: Gujarat University, Royal College of Physicians and Surgeons of Glasgow, Harvard School of Public Health
- Occupations: Doctor, researcher, social activist
- Known for: aboriginal health research & advocacy
- Notable work: Sick Kids Hospital; University of Toronto

Chandrakant Padamshi Shah, OC OOnt, is a Canadian doctor, researcher and social activist. Shah is the clinical coordinator of Anishnawbe Health Toronto in Toronto, Ontario, Canada. Shah has been a staff physician since 1996, providing primary health care to Toronto's indigenous community as well as people who have been marginalized, such as the homeless, the unemployed and children living in poverty. He is also a consultant with Peel Public Health, Honorary Staff of The Hospital for Sick Children, and Courtesy Staff at the St. Michael's Hospital (Toronto). He is professor emeritus of the Dalla Lana School of Public Health at the University of Toronto.

His textbook, now in its 6th edition Public Health and Preventive Medicine in Canada, is widely used by Canadian undergraduate and graduate students from a range of health disciplines. He published a memoir, To Change the World: My Work With Diversity, Equity & Inclusion in Canada (Toronto: Mawenzi House) in 2023.

He is recipient of several awards including the Order of Ontario and the Outstanding Physicians of Ontario award (2007) by the Council of the College of Physicians and Surgeons of Ontario for excellence and coming closest to meeting society's vision of an "ideal physician." He was made an Officer of the Order of Canada on December 31, 2025.

== Aboriginal Health and Wellness ==
Shah is most well known for his research and activism in the Aboriginal Health and Wellness space.
