= Toronto hospital baby deaths =

Purported homicides

The Toronto hospital baby deaths were a series of suspicious deaths that occurred in the Cardiac Ward of the Hospital for Sick Children in Toronto, Ontario, Canada between July 1980 and March 1981. The deaths started after a cardiology ward had been divided into two new adjacent wards. The deaths ended after the police had been called in, and the digitalis-type medication (digoxin) that had possibly been used for the alleged killings had begun to be kept under lock and key. Three nurses were at the centre of the investigation and an apparent attempt to poison nurses' food. One of the nurses, Susan Nelles, was charged with four murders, but the prosecution was dismissed a year later on the grounds that she could not have been responsible for a death excluded from the indictment, which the judge deemed a murder.

A conspiracy between multiple nurses was regarded by the judge as not credible. The lead detective resigned. An official government inquiry discounted claims by the hospital's own former chief of pediatrics that the deaths were not homicides and were not proven to be from digoxin. A second suspect was not prosecuted. It has been later argued that a chemical compound, which can leach out of rubber tubing that was used in medical apparatus for feeding and delivery of medication and can be mistakenly identified by medical tests as digoxin, had been the cause of some of the deaths.

The deaths are still believed to be homicides by some, such as the epidemiologist Alexandra M. Levitt, who devoted one chapter of a 2015 book to the case.

== Deaths ==
The Cardiac Ward of the Hospital for Sick Children began what was subsequently found to be a several-fold increase in mortality on 30 June 1980. Within two months, 20 patient deaths led to a group of nurses approaching the unit's cardiologists, but they kept the investigation limited and in-house to prevent a "morale problem." The excess deaths continued, but it was not until March 1981 that a bereaved father's extreme distress led to the coroner being brought in and detecting suspiciously high levels of a heart regulating medication digoxin, a powerful form of digitalis, in a dead baby.

Metro Toronto coroner Dr. Paul Tepperman said that he was first called to the hospital on 12 March 1981 because Kevin Garnett, the father of Kevin Pacsai, "was unusually upset" over the death of his three-week-old son that day. It was only on 20 March 1981, eight days later, that he was told about an autopsy in January on Janice Estrella, who had a digoxin level in her bloodstream, which was the highest that he had ever heard.

Eight days later, he was told that an autopsy by the hospital had found 13 times the normal concentration of the same heart drug in another dead baby. The medication had not been subject to any security measures. Police were called in and began to search staff lockers when another baby died from digoxin poisoning on 22 March 1981. Examination of work logs and other nurses' subjective impression that a colleague had inappropriate reactions to the deaths led to the arrest and the charging with murder of a nurse, who was released on bail.

In January 1982, babies became ill in a separate department. It was later found that epinephrine, which was not supposed to be in that ward, had somehow been substituted for vitamin E. There had been non-fatal unauthorized digoxin administration to other babies, and another death was, contrary to what the hospital had said at the time, caused by unauthorized administration of digoxin. In September 1981, the team leader nurse Phyllis Trayner (died 2011) found propranolol tablets in food that she was eating, and another nurse found the tablets in her soup.

== Police investigation and inquiry ==
Susan Nelles was arrested and charged with murder, but a judge acquitted her at the preliminary hearing stage and the case never went to trial, partly because she had not been on duty during one death which the judge decided to be an additional murder, and for more than one nurse to have been involved in a series of motiveless murders strained credulity. The exonerated nurse did not believe that there had been any murders, and in a 2011 interview, she reiterated that the 1985 inquiry report had been incorrect in stating that many deaths during a rise in mortality on the ward (from one a week to five) had been deliberate homicides. Data from the investigation was sent to the US Centers for Disease Control and Prevention, which discovered that another nurse, Phyllis Trayner, was the only person who had been on duty for all 29 cases of death being examined. A commission of inquiry listed eight of the baby deaths as murder, with another 13 as highly suspicious. Even after the commission had started its work, another death, apparently by digoxin poisoning, occurred. The commission decided not to take that into account.

Trayner, who denied any impropriety in her behaviour on the ward, was questioned in televised inquiry hearings and resigned after the inquiry's report was published.

== Legacy ==
"Regina v. Nelles", a dramatization of Nelles' trial, aired in 1992 as an episode of CBC Television's anthology series Scales of Justice.

== See also ==
- Ann Arbor Hospital Murders — another inconclusive case in which nurses were accused of apparently motiveless homicides.
- Lucy Letby — a British neonatal nurse and serial killer who was convicted of killing 7 babies and attacking six others on the ward in which she worked.
- Charles Cullen — convicted serial killer nurse who used digoxin.
- Lucia de Berk — Dutch nurse convicted of murder in a major miscarriage of justice because of the misidentification of digoxin poisoning.
- Elizabeth Wettlaufer — a convicted Canadian serial killer and registered nurse who confessed to murdering eight senior citizens and attempting to murder six others by injecting them with insulin.
- Orville Lynn Majors — a licensed practical nurse and serial killer who was convicted of murdering his patients in Clinton, Indiana.
- Harold Shipman — an English doctor in general practice and serial killer.
- List of unsolved murders (1980–1999)
