= Freda Miller =

Canadian developmental neurobiologist

Freda D. Miller
- Education: Degree in biochemistry Ph.D. degree in medical sciences
- Alma mater: University of Saskatchewan; University of Calgary
- Known for: Developmental Neurobiology
- Awards: Fellow, Royal Society of Canada, Fellow, American Association for the Advancement of Science (AAAS), Howard Hughes Medical Institute International Research Scholar
- Scientific career
- Workplaces: University of Toronto, Hospital for Sick Children
- Website: https://lab.research.sickkids.ca/miller-kaplan/principal-investigators/

Dr. Freda Miller, FRSC is a developmental neurobiologist at the Hospital for Sick Children Research Institute and a professor at the University of Toronto. Dr. Miller holds a Canada Research Chair in developmental neurobiology and her work focuses on development and regeneration of neurons.

== Education and early life ==
Dr. Miller spent some of her early years in Calgary and attended the gifted program at Queen Elizabeth High School in Calgary. She received a Ph.D. degree in medical sciences at the University of Calgary and earned her B.Sc. degree in biochemistry at the University of Saskatchewan.

In 2002, Miller was a founder of the Canadian biotech company Aegera Therapeutics.

== Achievements ==
- Fellow, Royal Society of Canada
- International Research Scholar, Howard Hughes Medical Institute
- Fellow, American Association for the Advancement of Science
- President of the Canadian Association for Neuroscience 2016-2017

== Honors and distinctions ==
In recognition of Dr. Freda Miller's scientific career, trustees of the Calgary Board of Education named a new elementary school "Dr. Freda Miller School". The school opened in September 2020.

== Research ==
Dr. Freda Miller works on neuronal repair mechanism and has published over 140 articles on different areas of the nervous system, including skin stem cells, neuronal growth, survival and death. Miller also has 15 issued and pending patents.

Her research interests include:

- Neural stem cells
- Neurotrophin growth, connectivity and cell survival
- Molecular regulation of neurogenesis
