= Sanford Jackson (biochemist) =

Canadian biochemist

Sanford Jackson was a Canadian biochemist.

Jackson graduated from the University of Toronto in chemical engineering and pathological chemistry. He was research biochemist and biochemist-in-chief at the Toronto Hospital for Sick Children 1937–1974.

Jackson was a founding member of the Canadian Society of Clinical Chemists and the Ontario Society of Clinical Chemists. He invented the bilirubinometer, which allowed more accurate measurement of serum bilirubin in infants and children.

Jackson died 4 September 2000 at age 91.
