= Rulan S. Parekh =

American-Canadian clinician-scientist and nephrologist

Academic background
- Education: MSc, MPH, Medical degree
- Alma mater: University of Michigan; Albany Medical College

Academic work
- Institutions: University of Toronto; SickKids Hospital

Rulan S. Parekh is an American-Canadian clinician-scientist and nephrologist. She is the vice president of research, education and innovation at Women's College Hospital and former senior scientist in Child Health Evaluative Sciences and Associate Chief of Clinical Research at SickKids.

The focus of Parekh's research is to study risk factors both clinical and genetic leading to the progression of chronic kidney and cardiovascular disease.

== Early life and education ==
Parekh completed her medical degree from Albany Medical College and her MSc from the University of Michigan (UMich). Following this, she accepted an American Kidney Fund-Amgen Clinical Scientist in Nephrology fellowship at UMich, where she conducted a study of cardiovascular mortality in children with End-stage renal failure. She also simultaneously completed a Master of Public Health degree, with a concentration in biostatistics and clinical research.

== Career ==
Upon completing her post-doctoral training at Johns Hopkins University, Parekh joined the faculty at the University of Toronto (U of T) in 2000. As a professor of Pediatrics and Medicine in the Division of Nephrology at U of T, Parekh focused on risk factors for progression to chronic kidney disease and sequelae of chronic kidney disease and end stage renal disease. In 2008, she co-published a novel genetic finding of a new chromosomal locus on 22 with non diabetic end stage renal disease among African Americans entitled Admixture mapping of 15,280 African Americans identifies obesity susceptibility loci on chromosomes 5 and X. As a result, she was elected to the American Society for Clinical Investigation in 2009.

By 2016, Parekh was the Associate Chief of Clinical Research, Senior Scientist at SickKids Hospital and Professor of Pediatrics and Medicine in the Departments of Pediatrics, Medicine, Epidemiology and Health Policy and Management Evaluation at the University of Toronto. While serving in this role, she received the 2016 American Nephrologists of Indian Origin Award for Clinical Excellence. In 2017, Parekh was appointed the Tier 1 Canada Research Chair in Chronic Kidney Disease Epidemiology in U of T's department of paediatrics and the hospital for SickKids.

During the COVID-19 pandemic, Parekh oversaw a national study of plasma donors who have recovered from COVID-19 to address immune response, duration of protective immunity, clinical factors, and host genetics contributing to the variability of immune response to the virus. Her research team also studied long-term outcomes from COVID-19 infection to help define therapeutic strategies for COVID-19. In 2021, Parekh became the only woman of colour leading research at one of Canada's top research hospitals and the first woman of colour to lead research, education and innovation at Women's College Hospital.

Parekh was elected a Fellow of the Canadian Academy of Health Sciences in 2025 for her contributions to health sciences.
