= Manojit Mohan Dhar =

Indian chemist

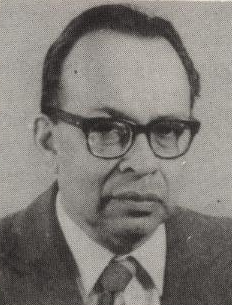
- Born: 13 January 1927; Kolkata, British India
- Died: 26 May 2003 (aged 76)
- Other name: M. M. Dhar
- Education: University of Manchester
- Occupations: Chemist, Researcher
- Known for: Studies on peptides and synthesis of the internucleotide bond
- Parent(s): Satyendra Mohan Dhar C.I.E., I.C.S. (father); Ava Dhar M.B.E. (mother)
- Relatives: Chittajit Mohan Dhar, M.P (cousin)
- Family: House of Dar
- Awards: 1971 Shanti Swarup Bhatnagar Prize; 1975 A.V. Mody Research Foundation Award

Manojit Mohan Dhar (1927–2003) was an Indian natural product chemist and the director of Central Drug Research Institute. He was known for his researches on peptides and the synthesis of the internucleotide bond and was an elected fellow of the Indian National Science Academy. The Council of Scientific and Industrial Research, the apex agency of the Government of India for scientific research, awarded him the Shanti Swarup Bhatnagar Prize for Science and Technology, one of the highest Indian science awards, in 1971, for his contributions to chemical sciences.

== Biography ==
M. M. Dhar, born on 13 January 1927, to Satyendra Mohan Dhar C.I.E., I.C.S. and Ava Dhar M.B.E. Dhar is the grandson of Sadhvi Saudamini and a descendant of Maharaja Virendra V.M. Dar via father and Sir. Krishna Govinda Gupta via mother. Dhar secured a PhD from Manchester University in 1952 for his thesis on peptides and joined Central Drug Research Institute (CDRI) where he worked as a deputy director, heading the Division of Medicinal Chemistry and Botany and subsequently, as the director of the institute. Later, he worked as the counselor of science to the High Commission of India to the United Kingdom. His researches were focused on the constituents of a number of indigenous plants and he studied their structures with a view to find their therapeutic uses. Thus, he discovered the glycosidase activity of decapeptides, abortifacient properties of tetrapeptide, receptor mimicking of acetylcholines and immunostimulant and immunosuppressant qualities of compounds that target opioid receptors. He was known to have screened over three thousand indigenous plant species for studying their structures and through his researches, he suggested that the secondary metabolites of microbial origin were formed during the detoxification of toxic constituent of the microorganism. He identified several active ingredients in plants and developed a new method of synthesis of internucleotide bond, using pyrimidine and purine anhydronucleosides. He discovered that the synthesis of quinomycin A could be catalysed by a cell-free extract of streptomyces. He was also a part of the CDRI investigation on parasitic protozoa causing diseases such as amoebiasis, leishmaniasis, filariasis, malaria and helminthiasis.

Dhar published his research findings in a number of articles (Note: Please see Selected bibliography section) and his works have been quoted by many scholars. (Note: Please see Citations section) He was associated with Bombay Natural History Society and Indian Chemical Society as a life member and sat in the council of Indian National Science Academy from 1988 to 1990. A former chair (1982) of the Commonwealth Agricultural Bureau International, he served as the commissioner of India chapter of the International Whaling Commission in 1982 and was a member of the Indian delegation to United Nations Vienna Conference on S&T for Development in 1979, Man and the Biosphere Programme conference held in Paris in 1979, World Climate Conference of Geneva in 1979 and the Heads of Science meeting of Group of 77 in Delhi in 1982.

== Death ==
M. M. Dhar died on 26 May 2003 at the age of 76.

== Awards and honours ==
The Council of Scientific and Industrial Research awarded Dhar the Shanti Swarup Bhatnagar Prize, one of the highest Indian science awards, in 1971 and the A. V. Mody Research Foundation Award reached him 1975. In between, the Indian National Science Academy elected him as their fellow in 1973. The Central Drug Research Institute have instituted an annual award, Dr. M. M. Dhar Memorial Distinguished Career Achievement Award, for honouring excellence in research in chemical sciences.

== Citations ==
- Profiles of Drug Substances, Excipients and Related Methodology. Academic Press. 2 May 1975. pp. 425–. ISBN 978-0-08-086099-2.
- Michael F. Grundon (January 1976). The Alkaloids. Royal Society of Chemistry. pp. 166–. ISBN 978-0-85186-307-8.
- Bep Oliver-Bever (23 January 1986). Medicinal Plants in Tropical West Africa. Cambridge University Press. pp. 286–. ISBN 978-0-521-26815-8.
- Mahendra Rai; Deepak Acharya; José Luis Rios (1 February 2011). Ethnomedicinal Plants: Revitalizing of Traditional Knowledge of Herbs. CRC Press. pp. 240–. ISBN 978-1-4398-5362-7.
- S.W. Pelletier (22 October 2013). Alkaloids: Chemical and Biological Perspectives. Elsevier. pp. 153–. ISBN 978-1-4832-8784-3.
- E. J. Ariëns (21 January 2016). Drug Design: Medicinal Chemistry: A Series of Monographs. Elsevier. pp. 250–. ISBN 978-1-4832-1611-9.

== Selected bibliography ==
- S. N., Bhattacharji S., Dhar M. M. Ghatak (ed.). "CDRI Researches on Parasitic Protozoa". Parasitology: 643. doi:10.1017/S0031182000080288.
- N. A. Bailey; C. P. Falshaw; W. D. Ollis; M. Watanabe; M. M. Dhar; A. W. Khan; V. C. Vora (1968). "The constitution of resistomycin". Chem. Commun. (7): 374–376. doi:10.1039/C19680000374.
- Dhar ML, Dhar MM, Dhawan BN, Mehrotra BN, Ray C (1968). "Screening of Indian plants for biological activity: I.". Indian J Exp Biol. 6 (4): 232–47. PMID 5720682.
- Bhakuni DS, Dhar ML, Dhar MM, Dhawan BN, Mehrotra BN (1969). "Screening of Indian plants for biological activity. II". Indian J Exp Biol. 7 (4): 250–62. PMID 5359097.
- Bhakuni DS, Dhar ML, Dhar MM, Dhawan BN, Gupta B, Srimal RC (1971). "Screening of Indian plants for biological activity. 3". Indian J Exp Biol. 9 (1): 91–102. PMID 5089325.
- Dhar ML, Dhar MM, Dhawan BN, Mehrotra BN, Srimal RC, Tandon JS (1973). "Screening of Indian plants for biological activity. IV". Indian J Exp Biol. 11 (1): 43–54. PMID 4779295.
- Jagat P.S. Sarin; Satyawan Singh; H.S. Garg; N.M. Khanna; M.M. Dhar (1976). "A flavonol glycoside with anticancer activity from Tephrosia candida". Phytochemistry. 15 (1): 232–234. Bibcode:1976PChem..15..232S. doi:10.1016/S0031-9422(00)89101-3.

== See also ==
- Decapeptide
- Tetrapeptide
- Acetylcholine
