= Canadian Institutes of Health Research =

Canadian granting body (Tri-council)

- Instituts de recherche en santé du Canada

Agency overview
- Formed: June 7, 2000; 26 years ago
- Preceding agency: Medical Research Council of Canada
- Jurisdiction: Government of Canada
- Headquarters: 234 Laurier Ave West Ottawa, Ontario K1A 0K9 Canada; 45°25′11.148″N 75°41′46.9422″W
- Employees: 330 (approximately)
- Annual budget: CA$ 1.3 billion (2023-24; Expenses)
- Minister responsible: Hon. Marjorie Michel, Health Canada
- Agency executive: Paul Hébert, President
- Child agency: 13 Institutes
- Website: www.cihr-irsc.gc.ca

The Canadian Institutes of Health Research (CIHR; French: Instituts de recherche en santé du Canada; IRSC) is a federal agency responsible for funding health and medical research in Canada. Comprising 13 institutes, it was formed on June 7, 2000 and is the successor to the Medical Research Council of Canada.

CIHR supports more than 15,000 researchers and trainees through grants, fellowships, scholarships, and other funding, as part of the federal government's investment in health research. Paul C. Hébert is the current President. CIHR's budget for 2023-2024 was CA$1.3 billion and the number of employees (FTE) was 327.

Along with the Social Sciences and Humanities Research Council (SSHRC) and the Natural Sciences and Engineering Research Council (NSERC), the CIHR forms the major source of federal government funding to post-secondary research. They are collectively referred to as the "Tri-Council" or "Tri-Agency".

== History ==
The Canadian Institutes of Health Research (CIHR) is the major federal agency responsible for funding health research in Canada. It was established by an Act of Parliament in April 2000 to create new knowledge according to internationally accepted scientific standards and translate this into improved health for Canadians, more effective health services and products, and a stronger Canadian health care system. It replaced the Medical Research Council of Canada, which had overseen Canadian medical research since 1969. CIHR reports to Parliament through the Minister of Health.

The Strategic Plan for the period 2021–2031 "establishes the context that will allow Canadian health research to be internationally recognized as inclusive, collaborative, transparent, culturally safe, and focused on real world impact." Five priority areas were identified:

1. Advance research excellence in all its diversity
2. Strengthen Canadian health research capacity
3. Accelerate the self-determination of Indigenous peoples in health research
4. Pursue health equity through research
5. Integrate evidence in health decisions

2024 funding reform: Following a student-led advocacy campaign (see Controversies, below), the 2024 Canadian federal budget included the largest increase to graduate and postdoctoral scholarships in over 20 years, significantly raising both the number and value of CIHR-funded awards.

=== Presidents ===
- Alan Bernstein, Founding President (2000-2007)
  - Pierre Chartrand, Acting President (2008)
- Alain Beaudet (2008-2016)
  - Roderick McInnes, Acting President (2017-2018)
- Michael Strong (2018-2025)
- Paul C. Hébert, appointed in January 2025 for a five-year term

== Governance ==
The CIHR Act outlines a framework for the organizational establishment of the Canadian Institutes of Health Research (CIHR), its governance infrastructure, responsibilities of the President and Governing Council and establishment of the Institutes.

CIHR consists of 13 institutes, each headed by a Scientific Director and assisted by an Institute Advisory Board.

CIHR is led by its President. Overall strategic directions are set by its Governing Council, which has a mandate to oversee the direction and management of the property, business and affairs of CIHR. Day-to-day management of CIHR is led by the Executive Team.

The Science Council (SC) is a management committee that develops, implements and reports on CIHR's research and knowledge translation strategy, in accordance with the CIHR Act and the overarching strategic directions set out by Governing Council. This includes approving funding for some research and knowledge translation initiatives.

== Institutes ==
The 13 CIHR institutes work together to shape a national health research agenda for Canada. They bring together researchers, health professionals, and policy-makers from voluntary health organizations, provincial government agencies, international research organizations, and industry and patient groups from across the country with a shared interest in improving the health of Canadians. A major goal of the institutes is to forge relationships across disciplines to stimulate integrative, multifaceted research agendas that respond to society's health priorities while adhering to the highest ethical standards. They fund health research within these four pillars:

1. Biomedical research
2. Clinical research
3. Health services research
4. Social, cultural, environmental and population health research

Institutes are "virtual" and fund research across Canada. Each focuses on a specific area of research:

- Institute of Aging
- Institute of Cancer Research
- Institute of Circulatory and Respiratory Health
- Institute of Gender and Health
- Institute of Genetics
- Institute of Health Services and Policy Research
- Institute of Human Development, Child and Youth Health
- Institute of Indigenous Peoples' Health
- Institute of Infection and Immunity
- Institute of Musculoskeletal Health and Arthritis
- Institute of Neurosciences, Mental Health and Addiction
- Institute of Nutrition, Metabolism and Diabetes
- Institute of Population and Public Health

== COVID-19 and vaccines ==
In June 2020, CIHR provided $109 million in funding to 139 research teams across Canada for COVID-19 research. Over the coming months and years, CIHR provided additional funding for COVID-19 research, totaling $430 million by June 2022. CIHR also worked with domestic and global partners to fund research and ensure the alignment and coordination of Canada's research with the international response.

On February 16, 2021, CIHR launched the CIHR-CEPI Leadership Award for Excellence in Vaccine Research for Infectious Diseases of Epidemic Potential, co-administered with the Coalition for Epidemic Preparedness Innovations (CEPI). The results were announced in April 2023 along with a $100 million investment from Global Affairs Canada to support CEPI's new five-year strategic plan to accelerate the development of vaccines.

== Controversies ==
A 2014 reform to the peer review process and the introduction of the Foundation Grant program lead to the demand from approximately 1000 researchers to reverse what was called a "radical" change. The Minister of Health Jane Philpott, then asked that the issue be addressed and the process was reversed in 2019.

The 2024 funding reform followed a sustained advocacy campaign by the Support Our Science (SOS) initiative, a graduate student-led organization founded in 2022. The campaign involved nationwide walkouts at 46 institutions, meetings with cabinet ministers, and direct engagement with the finance ministry. PhD student Kaitlin Kharas, who served as SOS executive director, was named to Nature's 10, annual list of ten people who shaped science in 2024.

CIHR funding success rates have steadily declined since 2005, from a 31% success rate to a success rate below 15% as of 2025. Critics say that these success rates too low to maintain a diverse and flourishing research environment, as only funding one in six applications leaves many excellent research programs unfunded. This narrow research focus can impact health outcomes: for example, a meta-study found consistently low CIHR funding levels for women's health across the last 15 years.

== See also ==
- Natural Sciences and Engineering Council (NSERC)
- Social Sciences and Humanities Resesarch Council (SSHRC)
- Canada Foundation for Innovation (CFI)
- Genome Canada
- National Institutes of Health – US counterpart
- Medical Research Council (United Kingdom) – UK counterpart
