= Stepan (given name) =

Stepan (Armenian: Ստեփան, Cyrillic: Степан) is a romanisation of an Armenian or an East Slavic masculine given name related to Stephen.

It may refer to:

== People ==
=== A ===
- Stepan Aghajanian (1863–1940), Armenian painter
- Stepan Akimov (1896–1941), Soviet general
- Stepan Akopov (1899–1958), Soviet engineer and politician
- Stepan Alexandrovsky (1842–1906), Russian painter
- Stepan Andreyevskiy (1782–1843), Russian military commander
- Stepan Fyodorovich Apraksin (1702–1758), Russian general-fieldmarshal
- Stepan Stepanovich Apraksin (1757–1827), Russian military commander and aristocrat
- Stepan Artyomenko (1913–1977), Soviet military commander
- Stepan Astafyev (born 1994), Kazakhstani cyclist
- Stepan Atayan (born 1966), Uzbek football midfielder

=== B ===
- Stepan Baidiuk (born 1940), Ukrainian long-distance runner
- Stepan Bakhayev (1922–1995), Soviet flying ace
- Stepan Balmashov (1882–1902), Russian assassin
- Stepan Bandera (1909–1959), Ukrainian radical politician, militant and theorist
- Stepan Barna (born 1961), Ukrainian activist and politician
- Stepan Beletsky (c. 1872–1918), Ukrainian civil servant
- Stepan Beril (born 1951), Transnistrian university president
- Stepan Betsa (1970–1992), Soviet and Ukrainian football midfielder
- Stepan Bogomyagkov (1890–1966), Soviet military commander
- Stepan Bondarev (1923–2016), Soviet military commander
- Stepan Borozenets (1922–2016), Soviet air force colonel
- Stepan Bulba (born 1950), Ukrainian politician and military scientist

=== C ===
- Stepan Chapman (1951–2014), American speculative fiction writer
- Stepan Chernovetskyi (born 1978), Ukrainian businessman
- Stepan Chervonenko (1915–2003), Soviet ambassador
- Stepan Chubenko (1997–2014), Ukrainian football goalkeeper

=== D ===
- Stepan Davydov (1777–1825), Russian singer and composer
- Stepan Degtyarev (1766–1813), Russian composer
- Stepan Demirchyan (born 1959), Armenian politician
- Stepan Dimitrov (born 1995), Moldovan taekwondo athlete
- Stepan Dmitriyevsky (born 1970), Soviet rower

=== E ===
- Stepan Erzya (1876–1959), Mordvin sculptor

=== F ===
- Stepan Falkovsky (born 1996), Belarusian ice hockey defenceman
- Stepan Fedak (1901–1945), Ukrainian independence activist
- Stepan Fedorov (born 1987), Russian luger

=== G ===
- Stepan Galaktionov (1779–1854), Russian lithographer and painter
- Stepan Ganzey (born 1981), Russian swimmer
- Stepan Gedeonov (1816–1878), Russian playwright, critic, and historian
- Stepan Ghazaryan (born 1985), Armenian football goalkeeper
- Stepan Glotov (c. 1729–1769), Russian explorer and fur trader
- Stepan Gorbachev (born 1983), Kazakhstani gymnast
- Stepan Goryachevskikh (born 1985), Russian-Belarusian ice hockey goalkeeper
- Stepan Guryev (1902–1945), Soviet military commander

=== H ===
- Stepan Hiha (1959–2025), Ukrainian composer and singer
- Stepan Hirskyi (born 1991), Ukrainian football defender

=== I ===
- Stepan Ivakhiv (born 1968), Ukrainian businessman and politician

=== K ===
- Stepan Kachala (1815–1888), Ukrainian politician and writer
- Stepan Kalinin (1890–1975), Soviet army commander
- Stepan Kalynevych (1893–1954), Ukrainian educator
- Stepan Kayukov (1898–1960), Soviet actor
- Stepan Kechekjan (1890–1967), Russian-Armenian lawyer and historian
- Stepan Kevorkov (1903–1991), Armenian film director and actor
- Stepan Khalturin (1857–1882), Russian revolutionary terrorist
- Stepan Khilkov (1785–1854), Russian lieutenant-general
- Stepan Kiselev (born 1986), Russian marathon runner
- Stepan Klochurak (1895–1980), Ukrainian politician
- Stepan Kolesnikoff (1879–1955), Russian painter
- Stepan Kostyukov (born 1999), Russian football forward
- Stepan Kozhumyaka (1898–1989), Ukrainian engineer and linguist
- Stepan Krasheninnikov (1711–1755), Russian naturalist and geographer
- Stepan Krasovsky (1897–1983), Soviet air force marshal
- Stepan Kretov (1919–1975), Soviet air force pilot
- Stepan Krivov (born 1990), Russian ice hockey defenceman
- Stepan Kubiv (born 1962), Ukrainian politician
- Stepan Kucherov (1902–1973), Soviet naval officer
- Stepan Kurianov (born 1996), Russian cyclist
- Stepan Kuznetsov (1879–1932), Russian film actor

=== L ===
- Stepan Leidtorp (1902–?), Estonian politician
- Stepan Levitsky (1876–1924), Russian chess player
- Stepan Lucyszyn, English engineer

=== M ===
- Stepan Makarov (1848–1904), Russian vice-admiral and oceanographer
- Stepan Malkhasyants (1857–1947), Armenian philologist, linguist, and lexicographer
- Stepan Malygin (died 1764), Russian Arctic explorer
- Stepan Mamchich (1924–1974), Crimean seaside painter
- Stepan Maryanyan (born 1991), Russian Greco-Roman wrestler
- Stepan Matviyiv (born 1968), Ukrainian football midfielder and manager
- Stepan Melnikov (born 2002), Russian football midfielder
- Stepan Meniok (born 1949), Ukrainian Greek Catholic hierarch
- Stepan Mnatsakanian (1917–1994), Soviet Armenian architect
- Stepan Molokutsko (1979–2002), Ukrainian football forward

=== N ===
- Stepan Naumenko (1920–2004), Soviet flying ace
- Stepan Nechayev (1792–1860), Russian senator and historian
- Stepan Nercessian (born 1935), Brazilian actor and politician
- Stepan Neustroev (1922–1998), Soviet military commander

=== O ===
- Stepan Oborin (1892–1941), Soviet Army general
- Stepan Oganesyan (born 2001), Russian football forward
- Stepan Oshchepkov (1934–2012), Russian sprint canoer

=== P ===
- Stepan Petrenko (1922–1984), Ukrainian sniper, Hero of the Soviet Union
- Stepan Petrichenko (1892–1947), Russian revolutionary and politician
- Stepan Pimenov (1784–1833), Russians sculptor
- Stepan Pisakhov (1879–1960), Russian writer, ethnographer and artist
- Stepan Pogosyan (1932–2012), Armenian historian and politician

=== R ===
- Stepan Razin (1630–1671), Don Cossack leader
- Stepan Rybalchenko (1903–1986), Soviet military officer

=== S ===
- Stepan Shaumian (1878–1918), Armenian Bolshevik revolutionary
- Stepan Shchukin (1754–1828), Russian painter

=== T ===
- Stepan Tananykin (born 1963), Russian politician of Murmansk
- Stepan Tarabalka (1993–2022), Ukrainian fighter pilot
- Stepan Topal (1938–2018), Moldovan politician
- Stepan Tudor (1892–1941), Ukrainian writer and activist
- Stepan Tverdislavich (died 1243), Posadnik of Novgorod

=== U ===
- Stepan Usyk (1925–2001), Ukrainian painter

=== V ===
- Stepan Vytvytskyi (1884–1965), 2nd President of Ukraine (in exile)

=== W ===
- Stepan Wood, Canadian lawyer and legal scholar

=== Y ===
- Stepan Yanovsky (1815–1897), Russian Fyodor Dostoyevsky scholar
- Stepan Yudin (born 1980), Russian racewalker
- Stepan Yurchyshyn (1957–2025), Ukrainian Soviet footballer

=== Z ===
- Stepan Zakharchuk (born 1986), Russian ice hockey player
- Stepan Zatikyan (1946–1979), Soviet dissident and Armenian politician
- Stepan Zhdanov (born 1989), Russian ice hockey player
- Stepan Zhiryakov (1948–2025), Russian politician
- Stepan Zorian (1867–1919), Armenian revolutionary
- Stepan Zoryan (1890–1967), Armenian writer
- Stepan Zotov (1882–1938), Soviet military commander
- Stepan Zuev (born 1988), Russian alpine skier

== Fictional characters ==
- Stepan Khitrov, an uncle character in the 2007 film Eastern Promises
- Prince Stepan Oblonsky, in the novel Anna Karenina the title character's brother
- Stepan Plyushkin, in the novel Dead Souls

== Other ==
- Stepan (cat) (born 2008), Ukrainian cat who gained worldwide popularity on social media

== See also ==
- Stepan (surname)
- Stefan (given name)
- Stjepan
