= Stephen Clarkson =

Canadian political scientist & professor of political economy (1937–2016)

Stephen Clarkson CM FRSC
- Born: 21 October 1937; London, England
- Died: 28 February 2016 (aged 78); Freiburg, Germany
- Occupation: academic
- Known for: 1969 Toronto Mayoral Election
- Political party: Liberal Party of Canada (Civic Liberal)
- Spouse(s): Adrienne Clarkson (1963–1975, div.); Christina McCall (1978–2005, her death); Nora Born (2014–2016, his death)

Stephen Clarkson, CM FRSC (21 October 1937 – 28 February 2016) was one of Canada's preeminent political scientists and a professor of political economy at the University of Toronto.

== Life and career ==
Clarkson's work focused mainly on two areas: the evolution of North America as a continental state, reinstitutionalized by the North American Free Trade Agreement (NAFTA) and two decades of neoconservatism; and the impact of globalization and trade liberalization on the Canadian state. His trilogy on these themes include Uncle Sam and Us: Globalization, Neoconservatism and the Canadian State, published in 2002; Does North America Exist? (2008) and Dependent America? How Canada and Mexico Construct US Power (2011); as well as: Global Governance and the Semi-peripheral State: The WTO and NAFTA as Canada's External Constitution in Governing under Stress: Middle Powers and the Challenge of Globalization. His latest projects looked at Interregionalism in the triangle Europe, North America and South America and at the Investor-State Dispute Arbitration.

Clarkson had taught and written on Canadian foreign policy and federal party politics. Following an unsuccessful campaign as Liberal candidate for the mayoralty of Toronto in 1969, Clarkson was active in the Liberal Party for six years. After Pierre Trudeau’s retirement from politics in 1984, Clarkson spent a decade co-authoring the book, Trudeau and Our Times, with his wife Christina McCall, which won the Governor General's Award for non-fiction.

Clarkson's knowledge and experience in Canadian politics led to the commissioning of a history of federal election campaigns in Canada from 1974 onward. These essays were the basis of his 2005 book, The Big Red Machine: How the Liberal Party Dominates Canadian Politics. Clarkson was renowned for his teaching, receiving many teaching awards in his tenure at the University of Toronto. He was a great encourager of “the engaged” life, taking his students on extra-curricular field studies to Washington, D.C., Mexico, Brazil, Madrid and Lisbon, and urging them to resist the world around them if they felt so inclined. Clarkson was a frequent commentator of Canadian politics, in both English and French. A lover of languages, he was also proficient in Spanish, German, Russian and Italian.

Clarkson earned a B.A. from the University of Toronto, an M.A. from New College, Oxford, and a D. de Rech. from the University of Paris. He was a Senior Fellow at Massey College, a Senior Fellow at the Centre for International Governance Innovation (CIGI) in Waterloo, Ontario and, in 2004, was elected as a fellow of the Royal Society of Canada. In 2010, he was appointed a Member of the Order of Canada. In 2013 Clarkson was adjudged the Konrad Adenauer Research Award of the Alexander von Humboldt Foundation, in connection with his academic work at the Wissenschaftskolleg zu Berlin.

The "Stephen Clarkson Scholarship in Political Economy" was established in his honor at the University of Toronto.

Clarkson's first wife was then broadcaster and future Governor General of Canada Adrienne Clarkson. His second wife was the late political writer Christina McCall.

Clarkson died in Germany of pneumonia which had developed into sepsis, while on a research trip with his students. He is survived by wife Nora Born, whom he married in 2014.

== Electoral record ==
Results of the December 1, 1969 Toronto Mayoral Election
Candidate	Affiliation	Popular vote		Elected?
Candidate	Affiliation	Votes	%	Elected?
William Dennison (Incumbent)	Independent	65,988	43.1%	
Margaret Campbell	Independent	52,742	34.5%	
Stephen Clarkson	Civic Liberal	31,889	20.9%	
John Riddell	League for Socialist Action	2,363	1.5%	
Total votes		138,549		

== Bibliography ==
- 1970 L'analyse soviétique des problèmes indiens du sous-développement, 1955-1964
- 1972 City lib: parties and reform
- 1978 The Soviet theory of development: India and the Third World in Marxist-Leninist scholarship
- 1982 Canada and the Reagan challenge: crisis in the Canadian-American relationship
- 1990 Trudeau and Our Times: Volume 1: The Magnificent Obsession (with Christina McCall)
- 1994 Trudeau and Our Times: Volume 2: The Heroic Delusion (with Christina McCall)
- 1998 Fearful asymmetries: the challenge of analyzing continental systems in a globalizing world
- 2000 "Apples and oranges": prospects for the comparative analysis of the EU and NAFTA as continental systems
- 2001 After the catastrophe: Canada's position in North America
- 2002 Lockstep in the continental ranks: redrawing the American perimeter after September 11th
- 2002 Uncle Sam and Us: Globalization, Neoconservatism, and the Canadian State
- 2005 Big Red Machine: How the Liberal Party Dominates Canadian Politics
- 2008 Does North America Exist?: Governing the Continent after NAFTA and 9/11
- 2010 A Perilous Imbalance: The Globalization of Canadian Law and Governance (with Stepan Wood)
- 2011 Dependent America? How Canada and Mexico Construct US Power (with Matto Mildenberger)
