= Krivov =

Krivov or Kryvov (Russian: Кривов, from кривой meaning wry, curved, or bent) is a Russian masculine surname, its feminine counterpart is Krivova or Kryvova. It may refer to

- Andrei Krivov (born 1976), Russian football player
- Andrey Krivov (born 1985), Russian race walker
- Stepan Krivov (born 1990), Russian ice hockey player
- Valeriy Kryvov (1951–1994), Ukrainian volleyball player
