= Tsarskoye Selo =

Imperial residence in Pushkin, St. Petersburg, Russia

Coordinates: 59°43′24″N 30°24′57″E

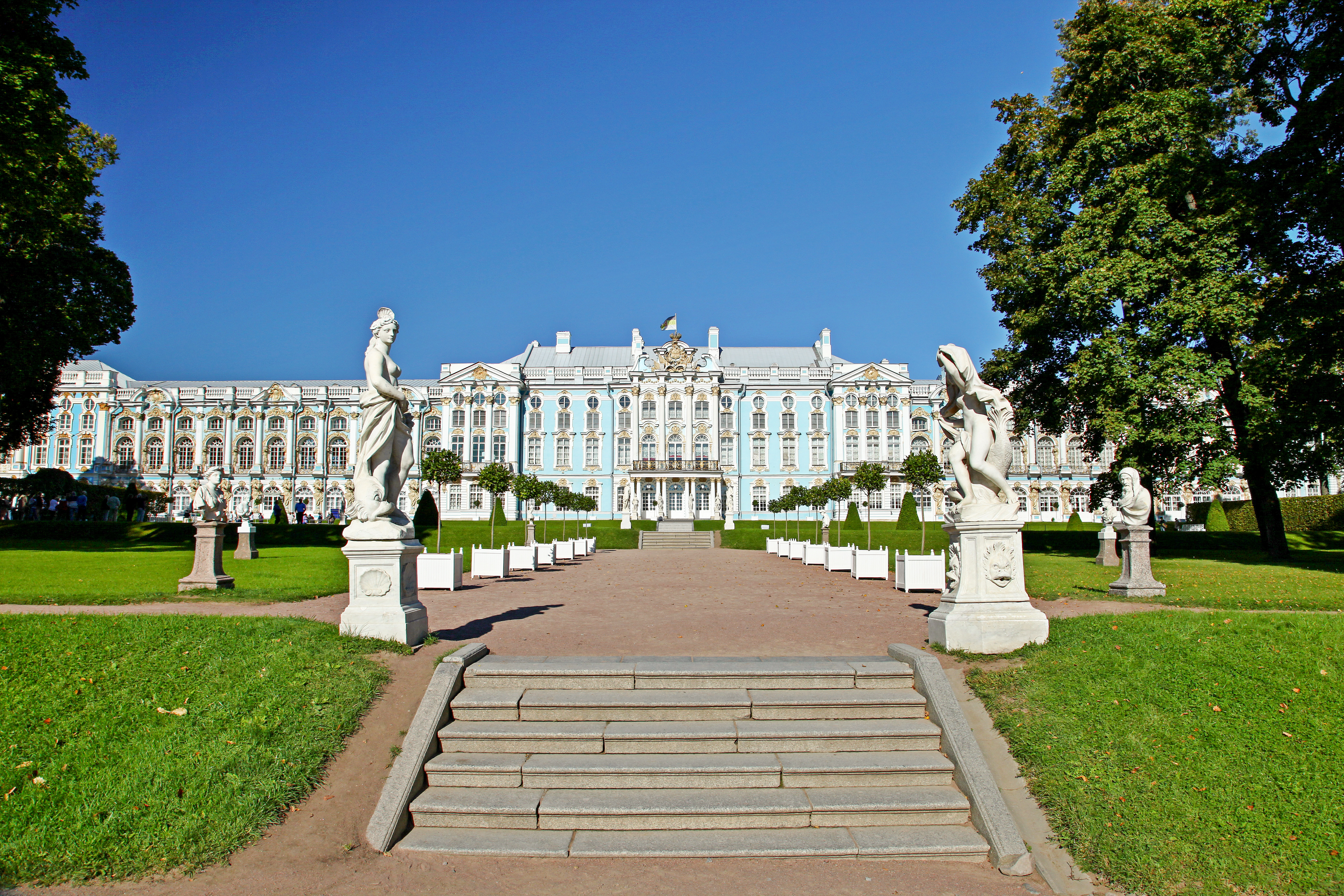
Catherine Palace and Park

Tsarskoye Selo (Russian: Ца́рское Село́, IPA: [ˈtsarskəje sʲɪˈlo], lit. 'Tsar's Village') was the town containing a former residence of the Russian imperial family and visiting nobility, located 24 kilometers (15 mi) south from the center of Saint Petersburg. The residence now forms part of the town of Pushkin. Tsarskoye Selo is part of the World Heritage Site of Saint Petersburg and Related Groups of Monuments.

The town bore the name Tsarskoye Selo until 1918. The new Bolshevik government of Soviet Russia renamed it as Detskoye Selo (Детское Село, 'Children's Village'), which it held from 1918–1937. At that time, it was renamed under Stalin's government as Pushkin (Пушкин) after the famous Russian poet and writer Alexander Pushkin. It is still known by that name.

== History ==
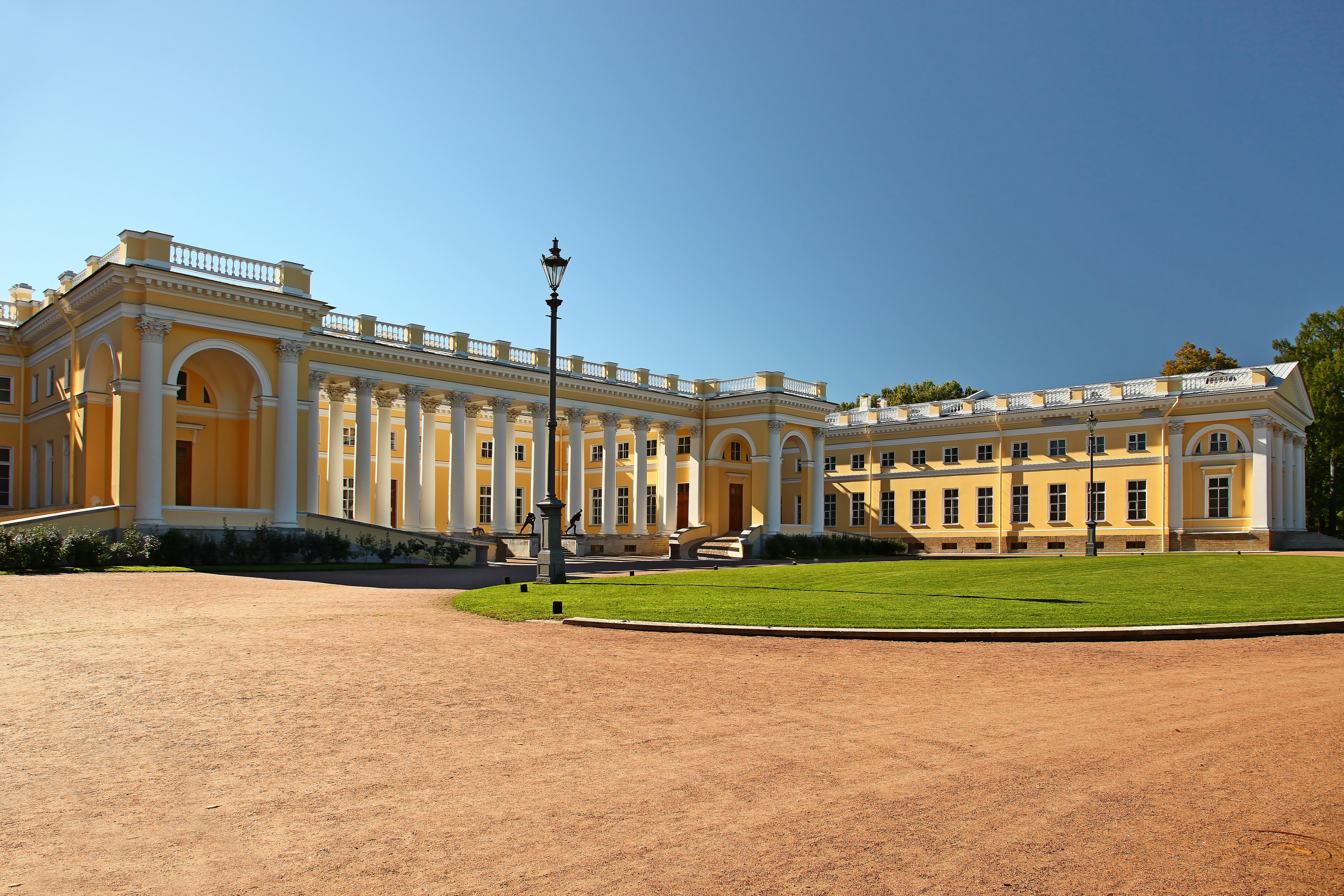
The Alexander Palace, view of the corps de logis from the cour d'honneur

The area of Tsarskoye Selo, once part of Swedish Ingria, first became a Russian royal/imperial residence in the early 18th century as an estate of the Empress-consort Catherine (later Empress-regnant as Catherine I, r. 1725–1727), for whom the Catherine Palace is named.

When Peter the Great took possession of the mouth of the Neva, a Finnish village, Saari-mois, stood on the site now occupied by the town, and its Russified name Sarskaya was changed into Tsarskoye when Peter presented it to his wife Catherine. It was especially embellished by the tsaritsa Elizabeth. Under Catherine II., a town, Sophia, was built close by, but its inhabitants were transferred to Tsarskoye Selo under Alexander I. The railway connecting the town with St Petersburg was the first (1838) to be constructed in Russia.

The Alexander Palace (built from 1792 onwards) was first the home of Catherine the Great's grandson, the Grand Duke Alexander Pavlovich, who later became Emperor Alexander I (r. 1801–1825). After his abdication, Nicholas II and his family were held there by revolutionary forces under house arrest until 13 August 1917. People built homes in the town where they also came to live when the court was in the country.

The Royal Forestry School, perhaps the first such school in Russia, was founded in Tsarskoye Selo in 1803. It was moved to Saint Petersburg in 1811 and developed as the Imperial Forestry Institute.

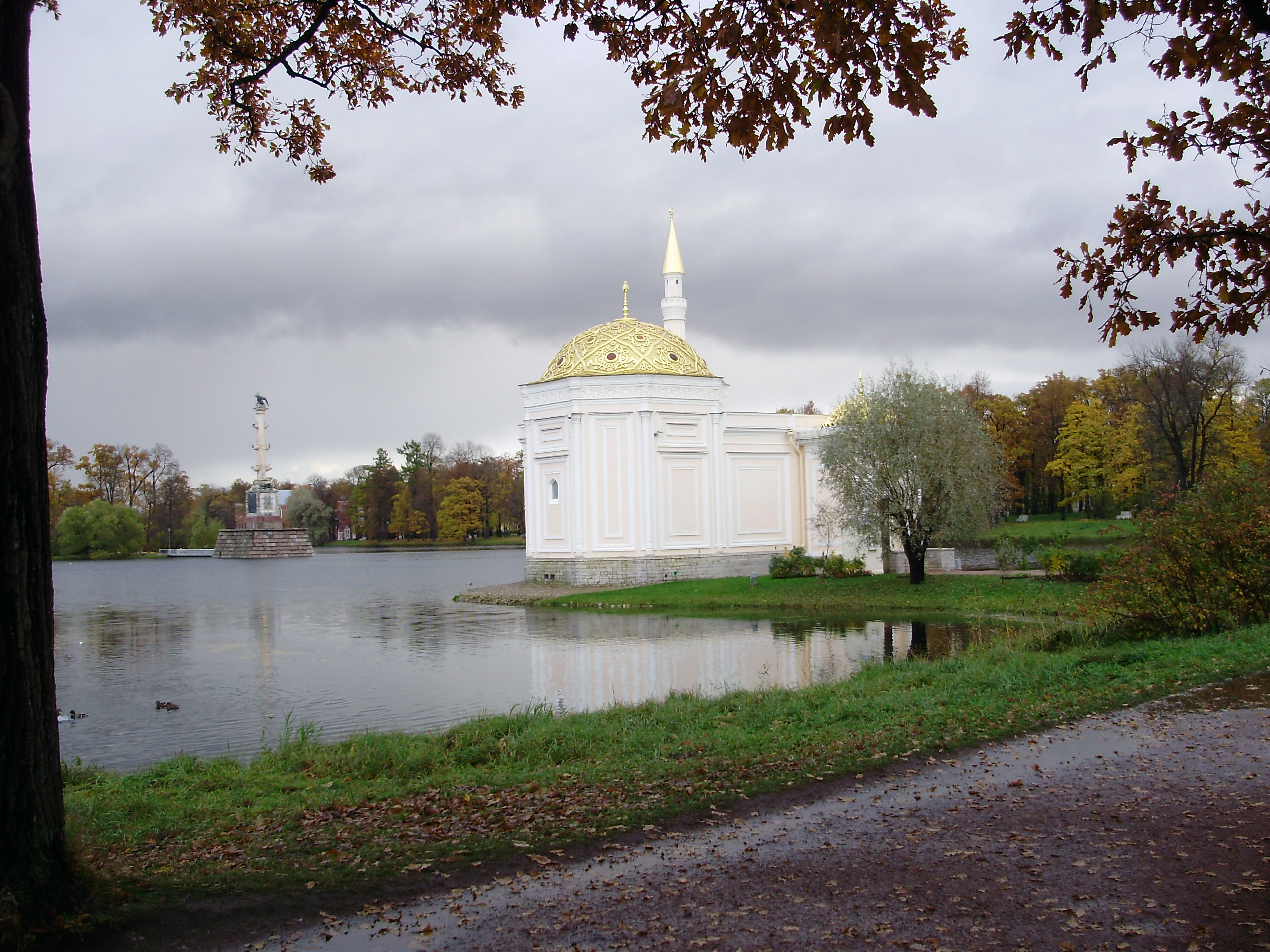
The hammam (Islamic bathhouse) in autumn

According to historian Robert K. Massie,

"Tsarskoe Selo was a magnificent symbol, a supreme gesture, of the Russian autocracy. At the edge of the great St. Petersburg plain, fifteen miles south of the capital, a succession of Russian tsars and empresses had created an isolated, miniature world, as artificial and fantastic as a precisely ordered mechanical toy. Inside the park, monuments, obelisks and triumphal arches studded eight hundred acres of velvet green lawn. An artificial lake, big enough for small sailboats, could be emptied and filled like a bathtub. At one end of the lake stood a pink Turkish bath; (Note: This would have been an Islamic Hammam at the time when the bath was built. This is confirmed by the building's dome and "minaret".) not far off, a dazzling red-and-gold Chinese pagoda crowned an artificial hillock." The two palaces stood five hundred yards apart in the Imperial Park. "Outside the palace gates, Tsarskoe Selo, was an elegant provincial town..." The town included "The mansions of the aristocracy, lining the wide tree-shaded boulevard which led from the railway station to the gates of the Imperial Park..."

=== Nickname for elite Soviet neighborhoods ===
In the decades of the Soviet Union, people applied the nickname "the Tsar's village" to the blocks and small neighborhoods in major cities that housed the nomenklatura (Soviet elites). Their stores were better stocked, although they were still affected by Soviet-era shortages. The buildings in the neighborhoods were better designed, constructed and maintained. For instance, one such neighborhood, west of Moscow, contained less industry and more parks than any other neighborhood.

== Monuments ==
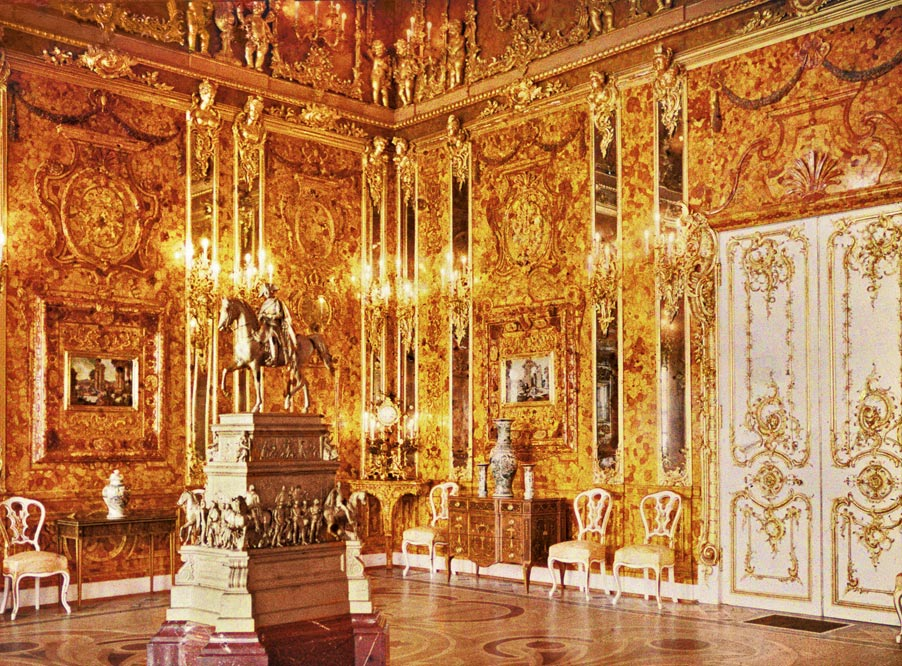
Catherine Palace, the Amber Room

- Alexander Palace and associated park
- Catherine Palace and associated park
  - Amber Room
  - Kagul Obelisk
- Sophia Cathedral
- Tsarskoye Selo Lyceum
- Feodorovsky Gorodok

== Gallery ==
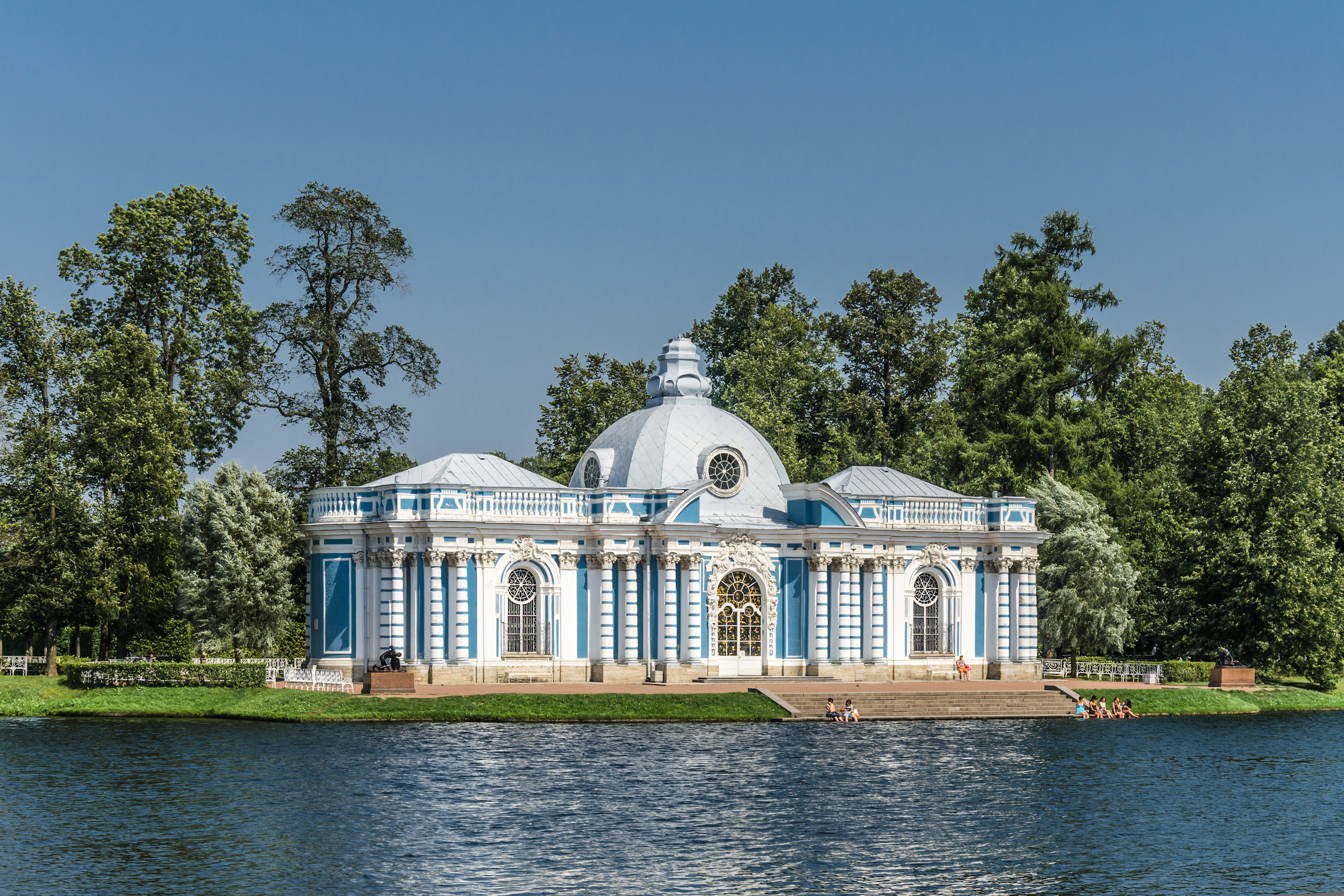
Grotto pavilion in Catherine Park of Tsarskoye Selo, Saint Petersburg, Russia

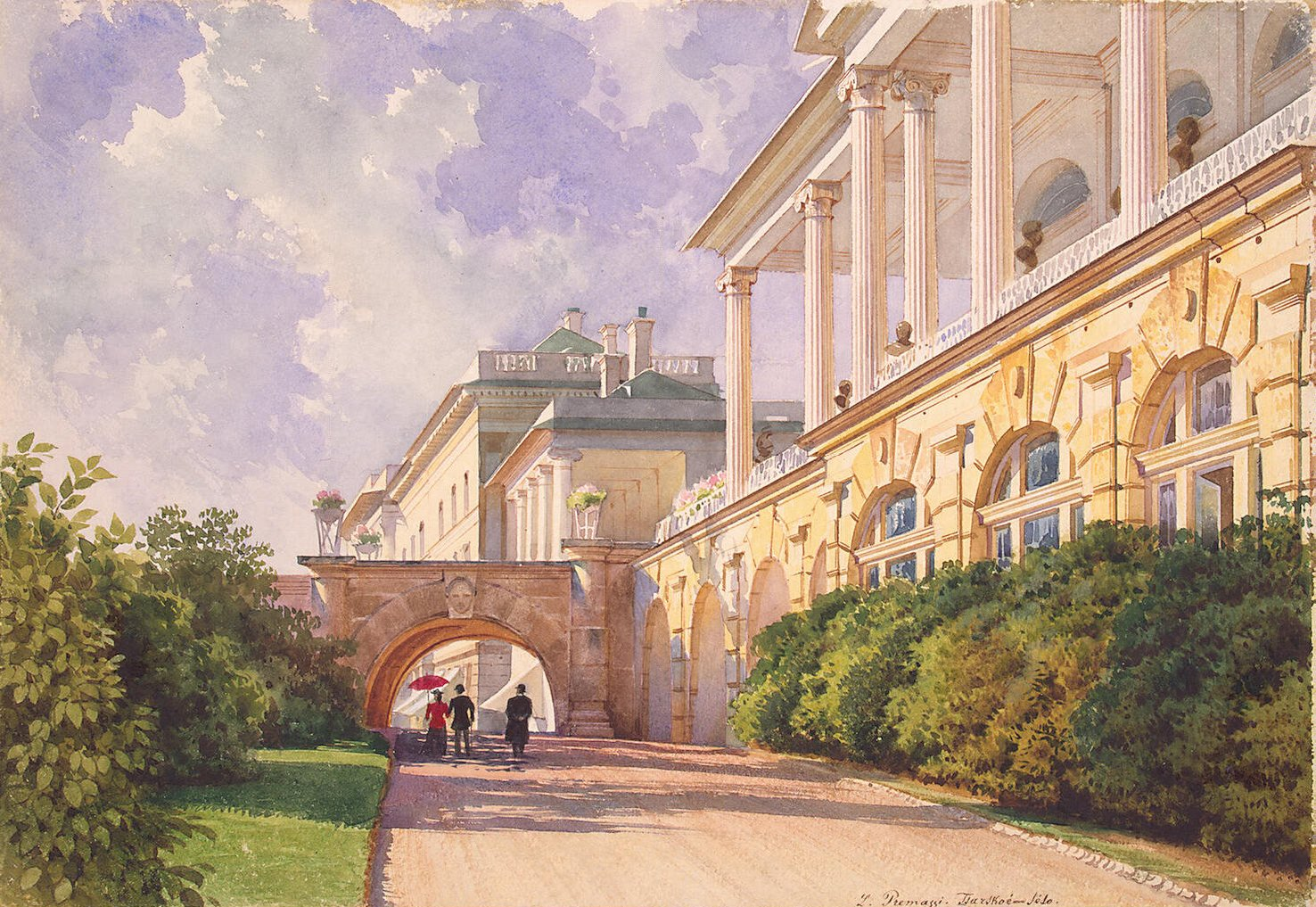
Catherine Palace with a view of the Cameron Gallery; Tsarskoye Selo in a watercolor by Luigi Premazzi, c. 1855

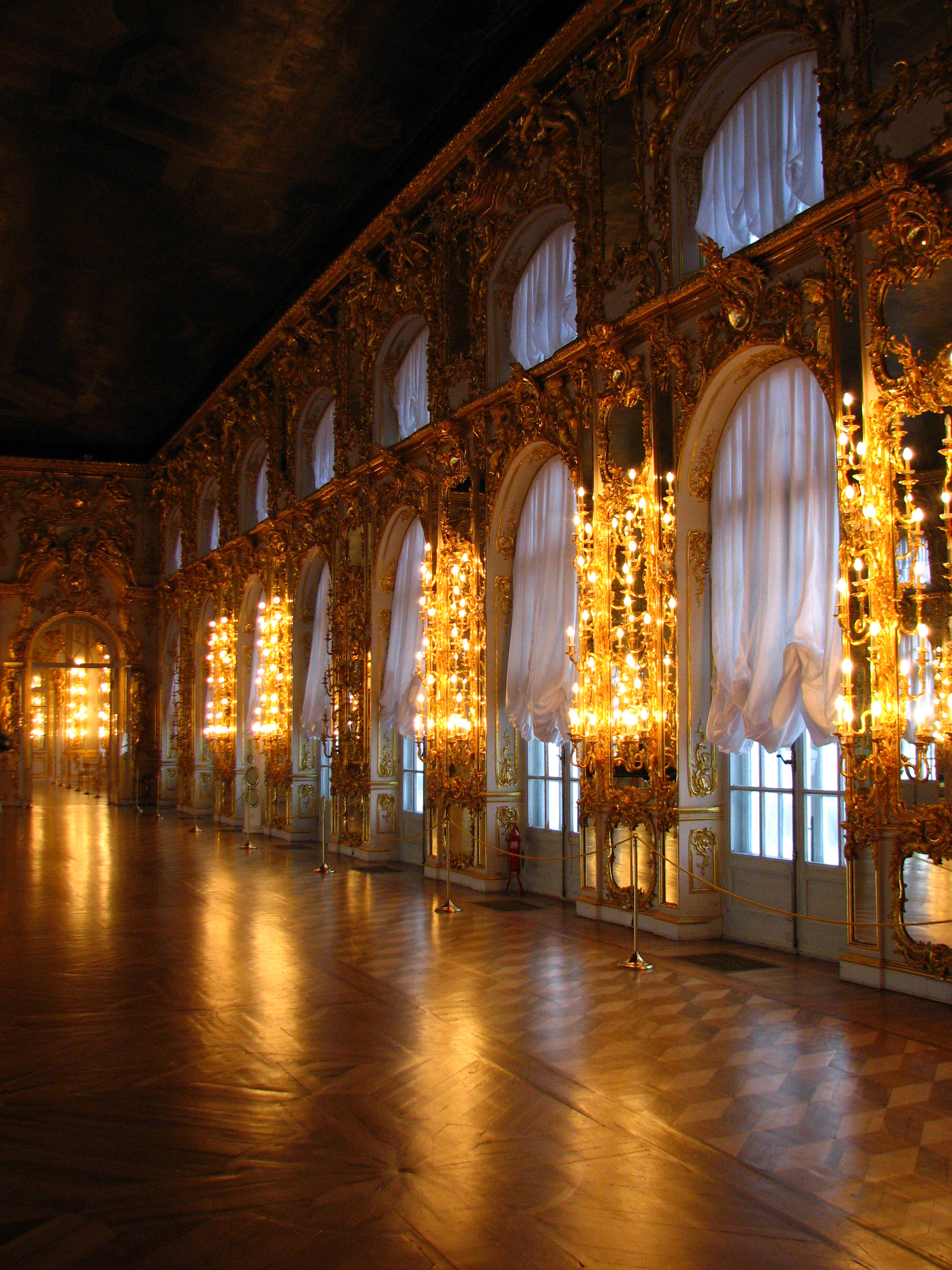
The Catherine Palace, the Great Hall

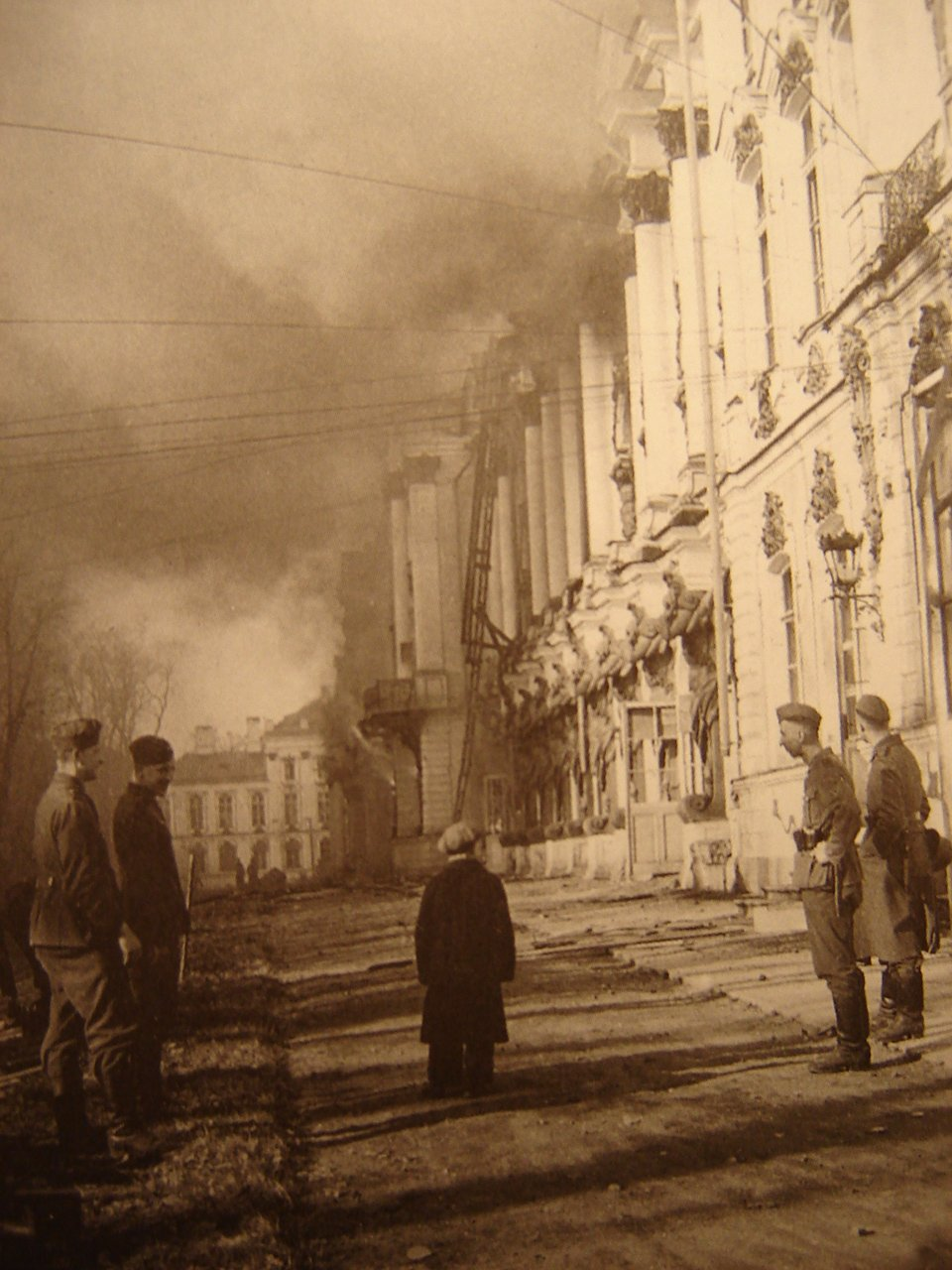
Fire in the Catherine Palace, 1942

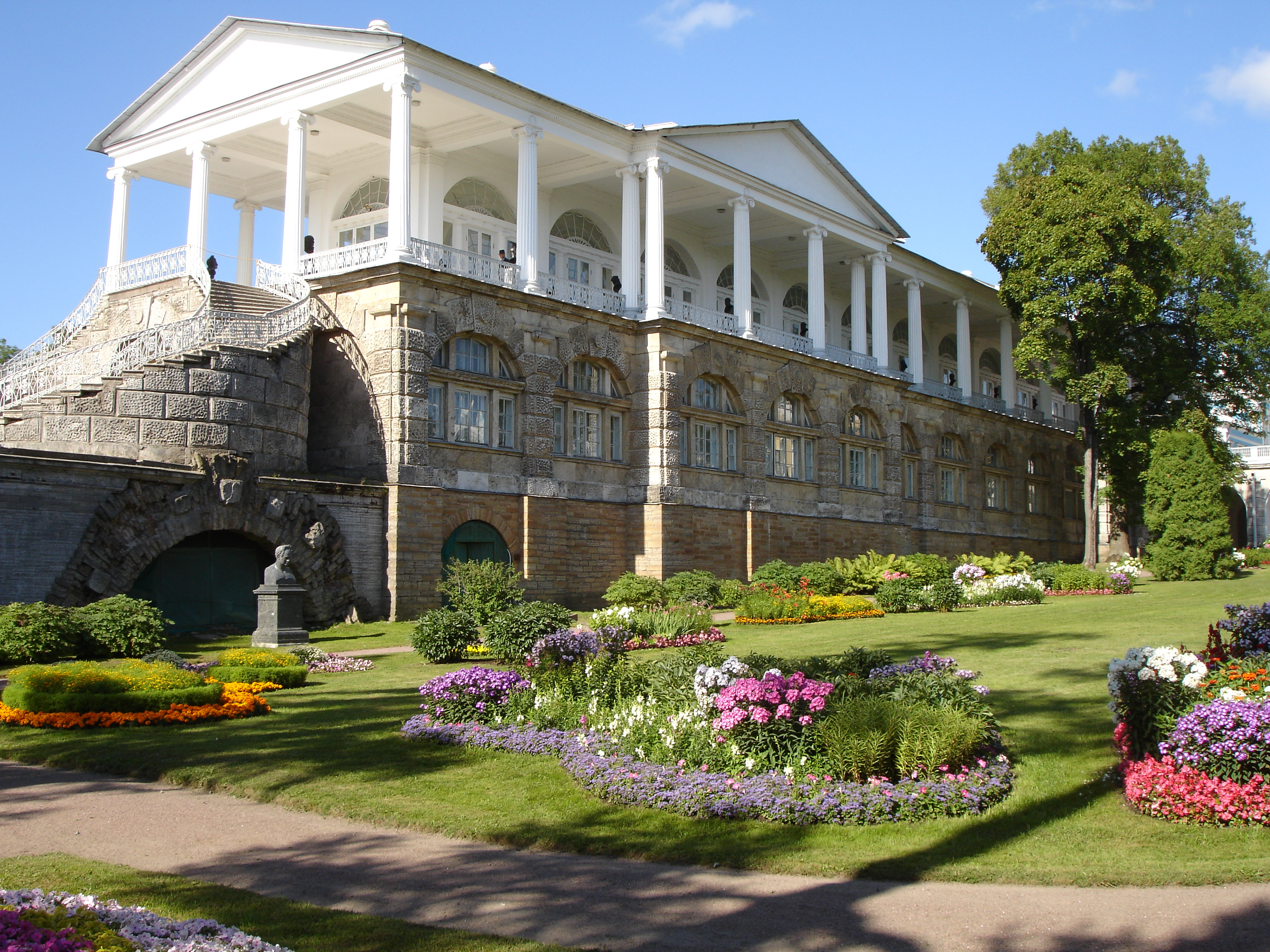
Cameron Gallery, Catherine Palace

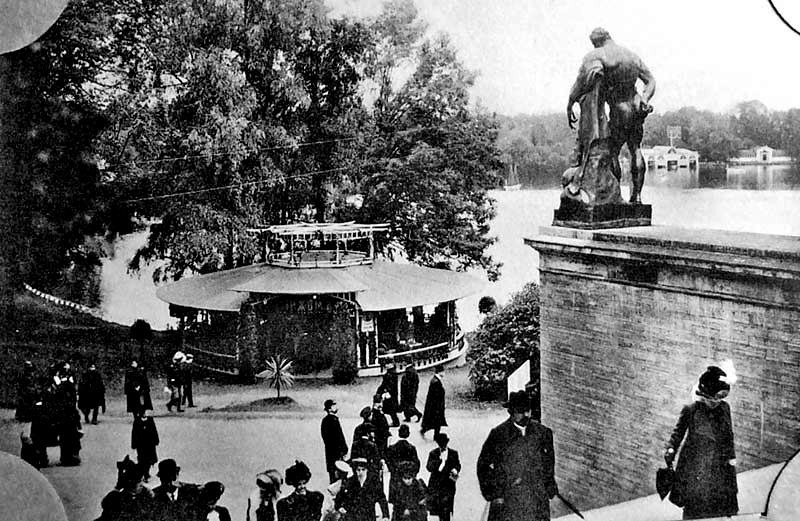
Jubilee exhibition for the 200th anniversary of Tsarskoye Selo, 1911

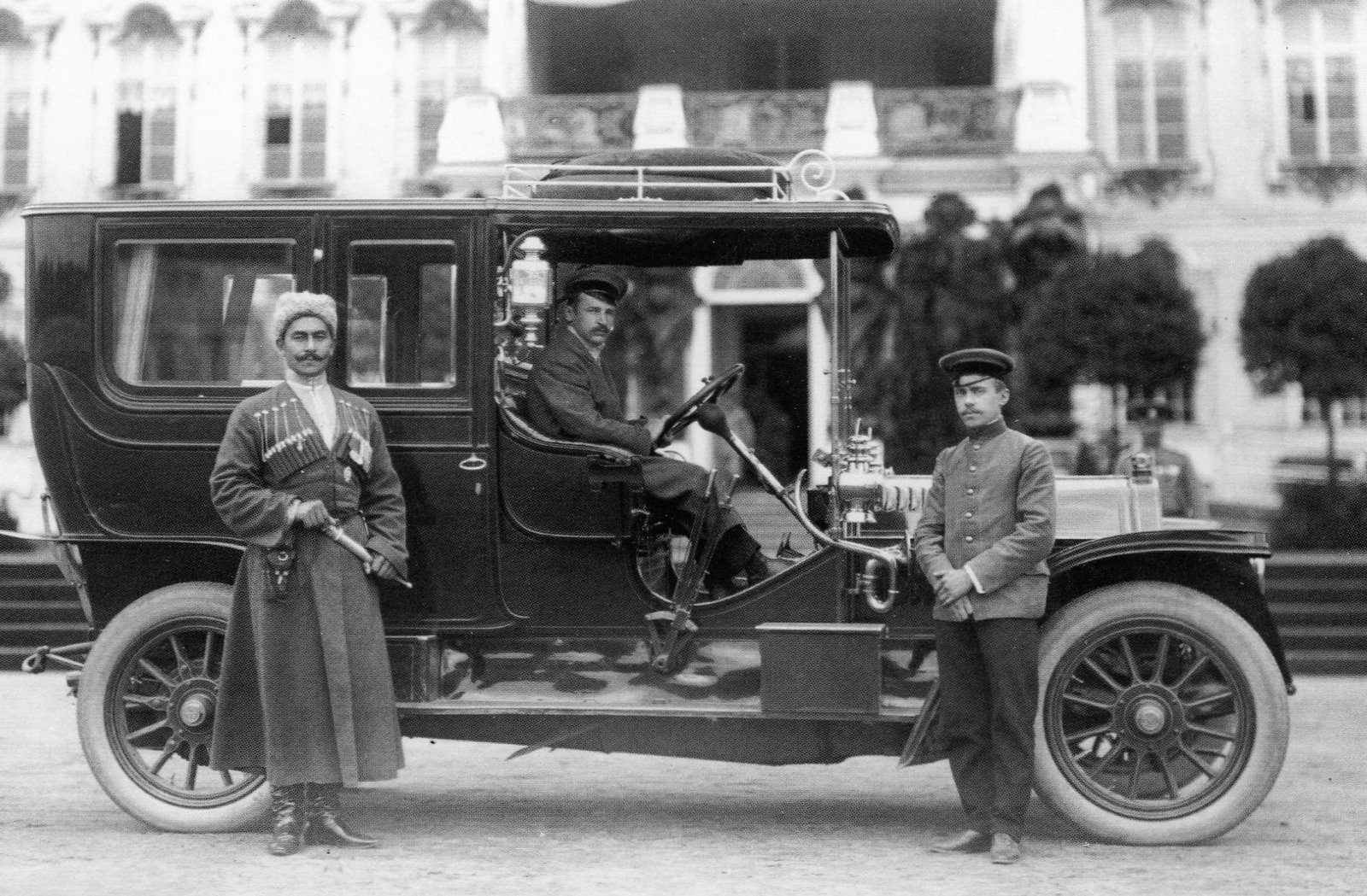
Catherine Palace at the main entrance, September 9, 1911. Adolphe Kégresse seated behind the wheel of the Imperial "Benz".

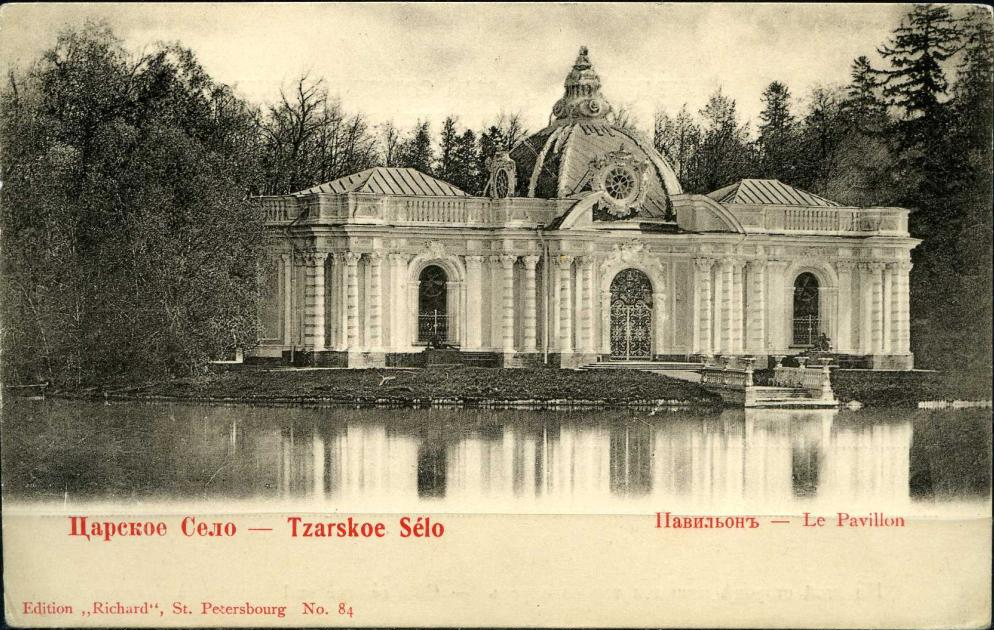
Catherine Park, pavilion "grotto", 1910

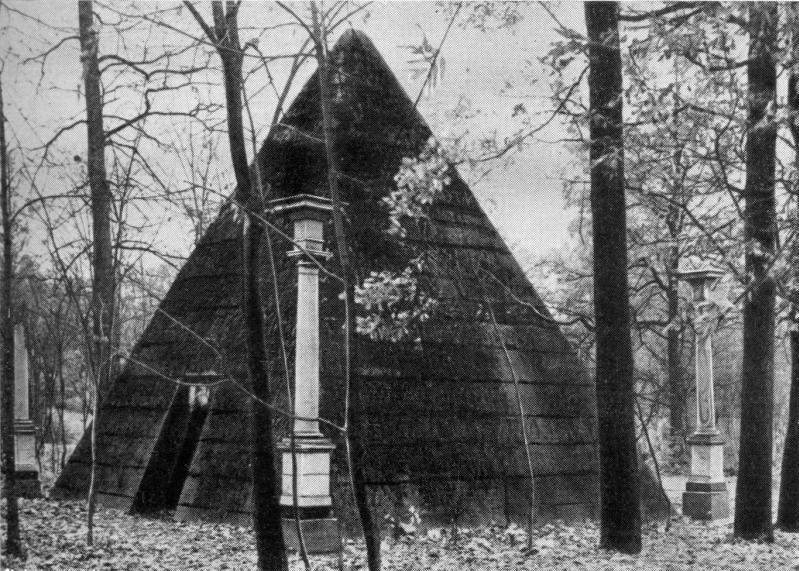
Catherine Park, Pyramid, 1910

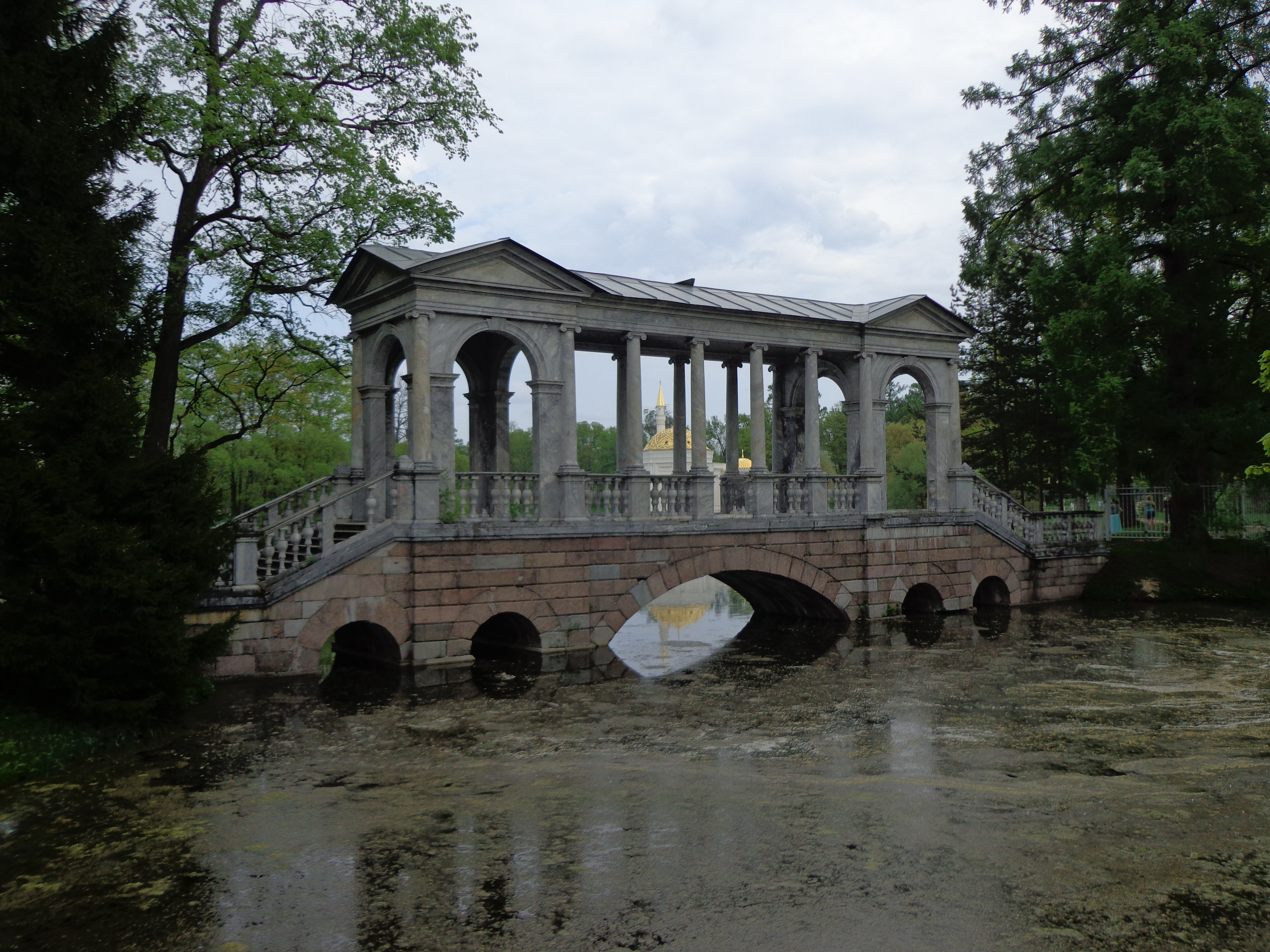
Catherine Park, Palladian Bridge

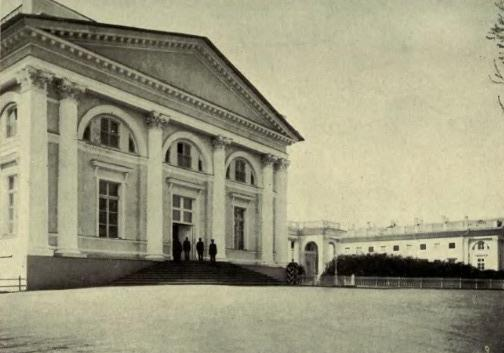
Alexander Palace, 1918

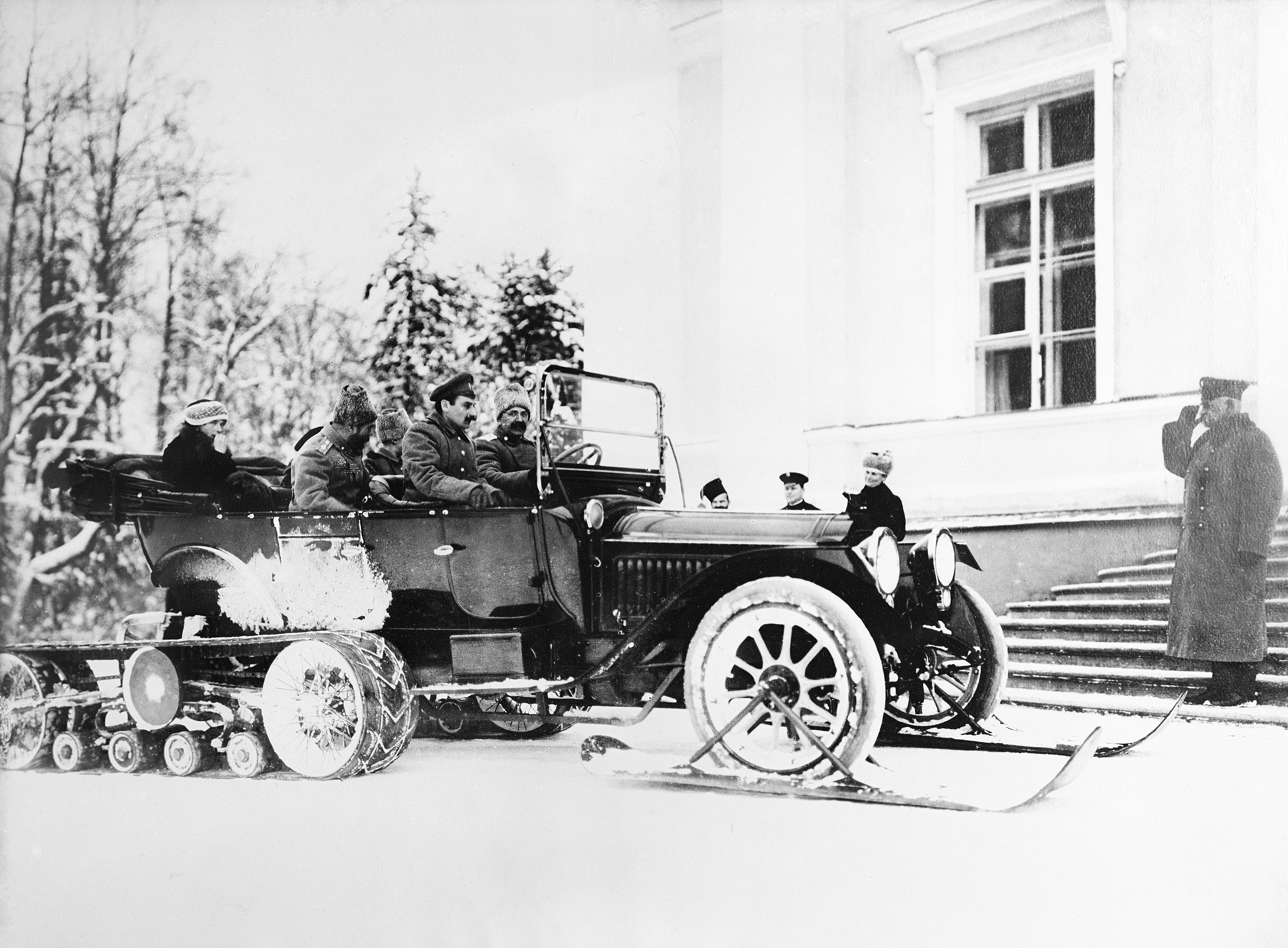
Kegresse track outside Alexander Palace, January 1917

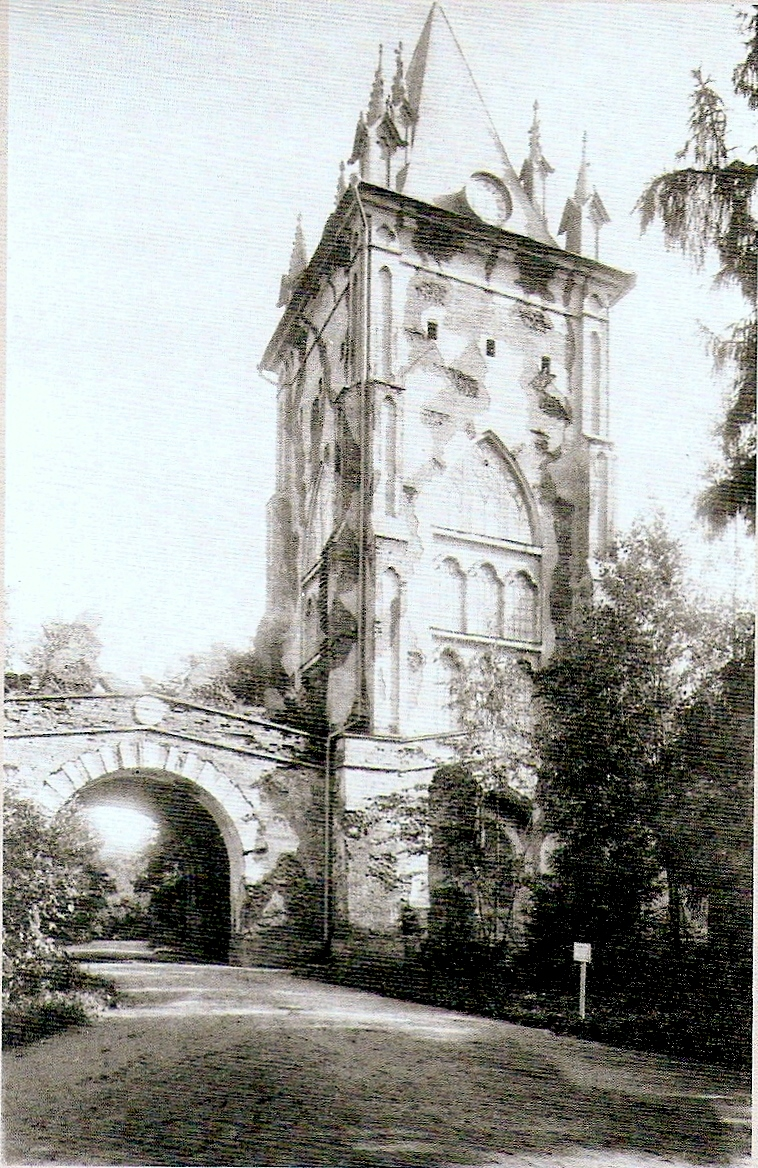
"Chapel" in Alexander Park, 1897

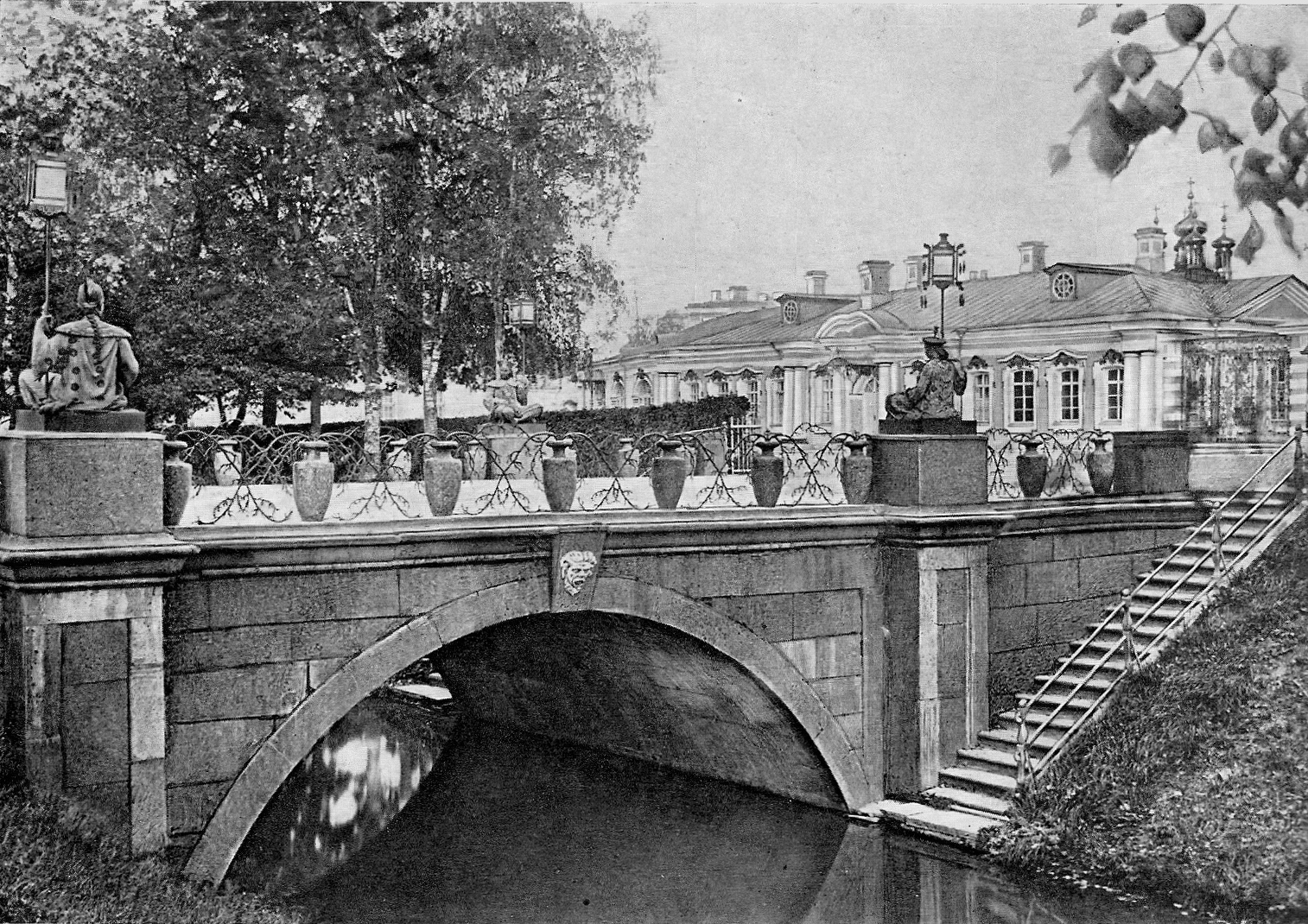
Large Chinese Bridge in Alexander Park, 1910

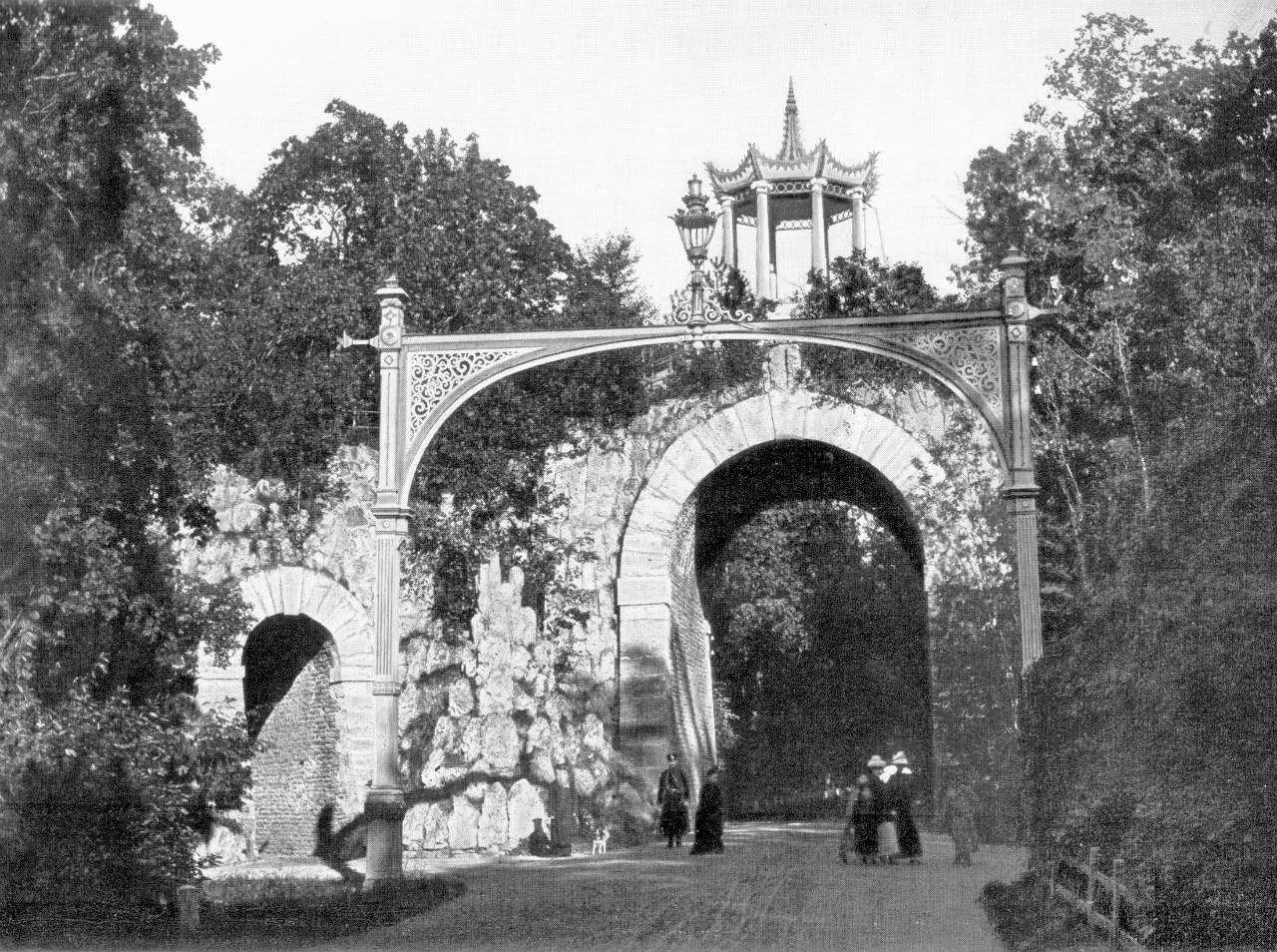
"Grand Caprice" in Alexander Park, 1911

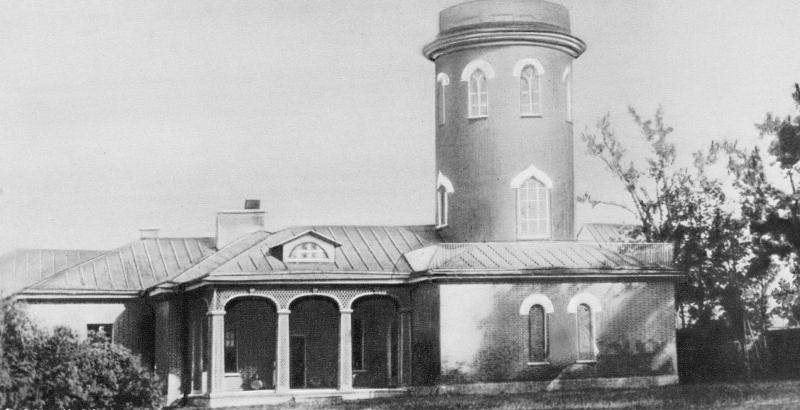
Farm outbuilding with a tower in Alexander Park, 1910

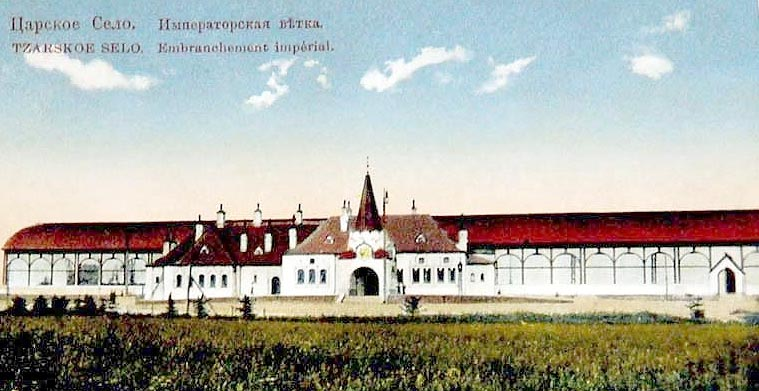
Tsarskoye Selo Imperial Station/Emperor railway station in Pushkin town, 1910s

== See also ==
- Treaty of Tsarskoye Selo
- Emperor railway station in Pushkin town
- Feodorovsky Gorodok
- Adolphe Kegresse
