= Christina McCall =

Canadian journalist & political writer (1935–2005)

- Born: 29 January 1935; Toronto, Ontario
- Died: 27 April 2005 (aged 70); Scarborough, Toronto, Ontario
- Education: University of Toronto
- Occupations: Writer, journalist
- Spouses: Peter C. Newman (m. 1959, divorced) Stephen Clarkson (m. 1978)
- Writing career
- Subject: Canadian politics
- Notable work: The Magnificent Obsession
- Notable awards: Governor General's Award

Christina McCall (29 January 1935 – 27 April 2005) was a Canadian political writer.

== Biography ==
Christina McCall was born on 29 January 1935 in Toronto, Ontario, to Orlie Alma (Freeman) and Christopher Warnock McCall. She studied English language and literature at Victoria University, Toronto, graduating with a Bachelor of Arts in 1956. She then spent the next 20 years as a journalist at The Globe and Mail, Saturday Night and Maclean's and as a senior editor at Chatelaine, as a senior political writer and author. She later worked with, and eventually married (in 1959 and separated before 1977), Peter C. Newman. She focused on book writing in the 1980s. She had done much writing about the late Prime Minister of Canada Pierre Trudeau, and published a two volume book entitled Trudeau and Our Times which she co-authored with then husband Stephen Clarkson (m. 1978). The first volume, The Magnificent Obsession, won a 1990 Governor General's Award.

She died on 27 April 2005 at the Providence Healthcare Centre after a long illness. She was survived by Clarkson and three children—Ashley McCall, her daughter with Newman, and Kyra Clarkson and Blaise Clarkson, Clarkson's children from his first marriage to Adrienne Clarkson.

== Bibliography ==
- Grits: An Intimate Portrait of the Liberal Party – 1982
- Trudeau and Our Times, Volume 1: The Magnificent Obsession – 1990 (with Stephen Clarkson)
- Trudeau and Our Times, Volume 2: The Heroic Delusion – 1994 (with Stephen Clarkson)
- My Life as a Dame: the personal and the political in the writings of Christina McCall – 2008 (ed. Stephen Clarkson)
