= The Canadian Establishment =

Book series by Peter C. Newman

Volume 1, First edition

The Canadian Establishment is a series of books published in Canada by economic journalist Peter C. Newman to catalogue the richest families and individuals in the country. The first book was published in 1975 and introduced Canadian and world readers to little-known figures who defined the Canadian economic community of the last quarter of the 20th century.

== Editions ==
- The Canadian Establishment: Volume One. Toronto: McClelland and Stewart. 1975. ISBN 0-7710-6755-0.
- The Canadian Establishment: Volume Two: The Acquisitors. Toronto: McClelland and Stewart. 1981. ISBN 0-7710-6784-4.
- The Titans: How The New Canadian Establishment Seized Power. Toronto: Viking (Penguin). 1998. ISBN 9780670883363.
