= Peter C. Newman =

Canadian journalist and writer (1929–2023)

Captain(N) Peter C. Newman CC CD
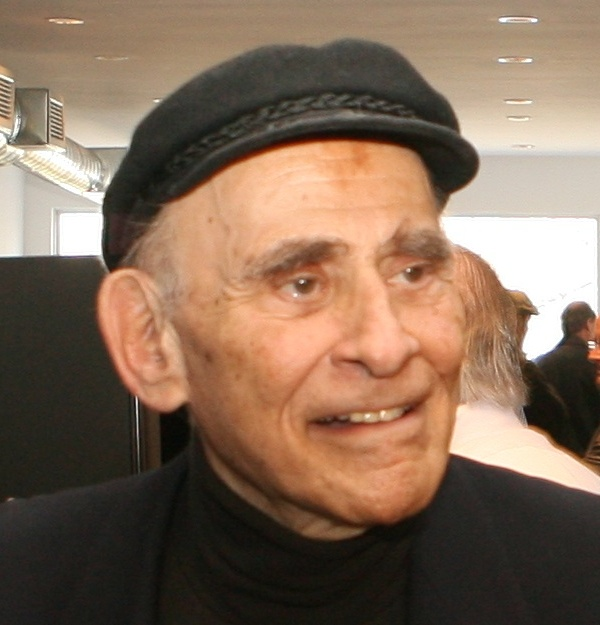
- Newman in 2010
- Born: Petr Karel Neumann; May 10, 1929; Vienna, Austria
- Died: September 7, 2023 (aged 94); Belleville, Ontario, Canada
- Education: Upper Canada College
- Alma mater: University of Toronto (BA)
- Occupations: Journalist; editor; author
- Spouses: Patricia McKee (divorced) Christina McCall (m. 1959, div. 1976) Camilla Jane Turner (m. 1979, div. 1990) Alvy Bjorklund (m. 1996)
- Children: 4 (2 daughters and 2 adopted stepdaughters)
- Writing career
- Subjects: Canadian politics; Canadian history
- Military career
- Allegiance: Canada
- Branch: Royal Canadian Naval Reserve
- Service years: 1947–1997
- Rank: Captain(N)
- Awards: Companion of the Order of Canada; Canadian Forces' Decoration

Peter Charles Newman CC CD (born Petr Karel Neumann; May 10, 1929 – September 7, 2023) was a Canadian journalist, editor and prolific author. He interviewed and wrote about every Canadian prime minister from Louis St. Laurent (1948–1957) to Paul Martin (2003–2006). His three-volume series on The Canadian Establishment helped set new standards for business reporting, while his three-volume history of the Hudson's Bay Company provided a comprehensive account of Canada's early beginnings as an international fur-trading nation.

Newman served as editor-in-chief at both the Toronto Star and Maclean's, the latter of which he transformed from a money-losing monthly magazine into a lively newsweekly that published some of the country's most talented journalists.

His half-dozen literary awards include the Drainie-Taylor Biography Prize for his 2004 autobiography Here Be Dragons: Telling Tales of People, Passion and Power.

In 1990, when Newman was promoted to the rank of Companion of the Order of Canada, his citation read: "Chronicler of our past and interpreter of our present, his popular histories and biographies continue to capture the imagination, bringing to life people, places and events that have shaped our great country."

== Early life ==
Born in Vienna, Austria, in 1929, Newman immigrated to Canada from Nazi-occupied Czechoslovakia in 1940 as a Jewish refugee. His parents were Wanda Maria and Oscar Karel Neumann, a wealthy self-made factory owner. The family escaped German dive bombing at Biarritz in France as they left Europe and U-boat attacks on their convoy before they arrived at Pier 21 in Halifax in September 1940. He was educated at Upper Canada College, where he was a member of Seaton's House, and the University of Toronto. Newman joined the Royal Canadian Navy reserve in 1947 as an ordinary seaman and later reached the rank of captain, having served in the naval reserve for 50 years.

== Career ==
Newman was a reporter for the Financial Post, served as editor of the Toronto Star, and was the long-time editor of Maclean's, stewarding its transformation from a general interest magazine to a weekly news magazine. In 1978 he was made an Officer of the Order of Canada (OC), and was promoted to the rank of Companion (CC) in 1990.

Newman was widely respected for his intimate knowledge and understanding of Canadian business leaders. Newman made his name as an author in the 1960s with the publication of two books: Renegade in Power: The Diefenbaker Years (1963), a study of the government of John Diefenbaker that some say helped destroy the Tory leader's career, and The Distemper of Our Times (1968), an examination of Canadian politics during the era of Lester Pearson. His 1975 book The Canadian Establishment was widely acclaimed.

On September 12, 2005, Newman announced the publication of The Secret Mulroney Tapes: Unguarded Confessions of a Prime Minister, a biography of former Canadian prime minister Brian Mulroney, whom he considered a friend. The information released to the press contained several surprising revelations, including an allegation by Mulroney that Pierre Trudeau's contribution "was not to build Canada but to destroy it." Later the same day, Mulroney issued a press release stating he felt "devastated" and "betrayed" by the publication of information he had understood to be confidential. Shortly after the publication of The Secret Mulroney Tapes, both Mulroney and Conrad Black filed suit against Newman. The lawsuit was settled the following year.

In 1973, Newman described his "ideological swing… away from a blind acceptance of the 'small-l' liberalism of the Fifties to a strongly-felt nationalism."

He was appointed visiting professor of distinction at Ryerson University in Toronto in December 2009. In October 2012, he joined the faculty of the Royal Military College of Canada as its first journalist-in-residence. In this role, he was involved with RMC's graduate and undergraduate programs and gave lectures on topics relating to business, politics and history.

== Personal life ==
Newman was married four times, once to writer Christina McCall. He lived with his fourth wife, Alvy (Bjorklund) Newman, in Belleville, Ontario. He died from complications of Parkinson's disease and a stroke at a hospital in Belleville on September 7, 2023, at the age of 94.

== Bibliography ==
- 1959 Flame of Power: Intimate Profiles of Canada's Greatest Businessmen
- 1963 Renegade in Power: The Diefenbaker Years
- 1968 The Distemper of Our Times: Canadian Politics in Transition
- 1969 A Nation Divided: Canada and the Coming of Pierre Trudeau
- 1972 Their Turn to Curtsy: Your Turn to Bow
- 1973 Home Country: People, Places, and Power Politics
- 1975 The Canadian Establishment: Volume One: The Old Order
- 1978 Bronfman Dynasty: The Rothschilds of the New World (published in America in 1979 under the different title, King of the Castle: The Making of a Dynasty)
- 1981 The Canadian Establishment: Volume Two: The Acquisitors
- 1982 The Establishment Man: Conrad Black, A Portrait of Power
- 1983 True North, Not Strong and Free: Defending the Peaceable Kingdom in the Nuclear Age
- 1983 Debrett's Illustrated Guide to the Canadian Establishment (editor)
- 1984 Drawn and Quartered: The Trudeau Years
- 1985 A History of the Hudson's Bay Company: Volume One: Company of Adventurers
- 1987 A History of the Hudson's Bay Company: Volume Two: Caesars of the Wilderness
- 1989 Empire of the Bay: An Illustrated History of the Hudson Bay Company
- 1991 A History of the Hudson's Bay Company: Volume Three: Merchant Princes
- 1989 Canada: The Great Lone Land
- 1991 Canada 1892: Portrait of a Promised Land
- 1993 Promise of the Pipeline
- 1995 Nortel, Northern Telecom: Past, Present, Future
- 1995 The Canadian Revolution: From Deference to Defiance
- 1996 Defining Moments: Dispatches from an Unfinished Revolution
- 1996 Vancouver: The Art of Living Well
- 1998 The Canadian Establishment: Volume Three: The Titans
- 1998 Sometimes a Great Nation: Will Canada Belong to the 21st Century?
- 1998 Canada: The Land that Shapes Us
- 2002 Continental Reach
- 2004 Here Be Dragons: Telling Tales of People, Passion and Power (Autobiography)
- 2005 The Secret Mulroney Tapes: Unguarded Confessions of a Prime Minister
- 2008 Izzy: The Passionate Life and Turbulent Times of Izzy Asper, Canada's Media Mogul
- 2010 Heroes: Canadian Champions, Dark Horses, and Icons
- 2010 Mavericks: Canadian Rebels, Renegades, and Anti-Heroes
- 2011 When the Gods Changed: The Death of Liberal Canada (originally titled: Michael Ignatieff: The Man In Full)
- 2016 "Hostages to Fortune: The United Empire Loyalists and The Making of Canada"
