= Stepan Alexandrovsky =

Russian painter

- Степан Александровский
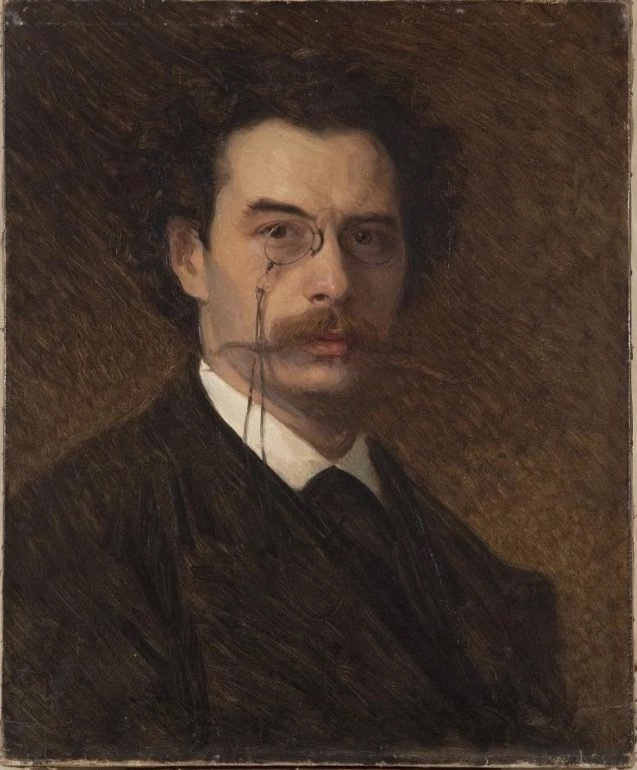
- Ivan Kramskoi, Stepan Alexandrovsky, 1870s, oil on canvas; Russian Museum, St. Petersburg
- Born: January 6, 1843; Riga
- Died: February 14, 1906 (aged 63); St. Petersburg
- Resting place: Smolensky Lutheran Cemetery, St. Petersburg
- Education: Imperial Academy of Arts (1869)
- Known for: Watercolour painting
- Relatives: Ivan Alexandrovsky (elder brother)
- Elected: Member Academy of Arts (1874)

Stepan Fyodorovich Alexandrovsky (Russian: Степа́н Фёдорович Александро́вский; 6 January 1843 [O.S. 25 December 1842] – 14 February 1906 [O.S. 1 February]) was a Russian painter in the Academical style, best known for his watercolour portraits.

== Biography ==
He attended a classical grammar school and was originally planning for a career in medicine, but soon found himself attracted to art. In pursuit of that, he moved to St. Petersburg and began auditing classes at the Imperial Academy of Arts. One of his portraits was awarded a small silver medal in 1861.

He was a regular participant in the Academy's exhibitions and was named an "Artist" in 1864. Later he became a "First-Class Artist" (1869). He was named an "Academician" in 1874 for his portrait of War Minister, Dmitry Milyutin. By 1884, he was a "Free Artist" and honorary member of the Academy.

He was one of the founding members of the Society of Russian Watercolorists. Among his best-known works are a series of portrait albums: thirty of Central Asian dignitaries who came to Moscow for the coronation of Alexander III (1884); forty-five of the Knights of various military orders (1886); and members of an embassy from 'Abd al-Ahad Khan, the Emir of Bukhara (1889).

He also provided illustrations for several periodicals and participated in exhibitions held by the Imperial Society for the Encouragement of the Arts.

== Works ==
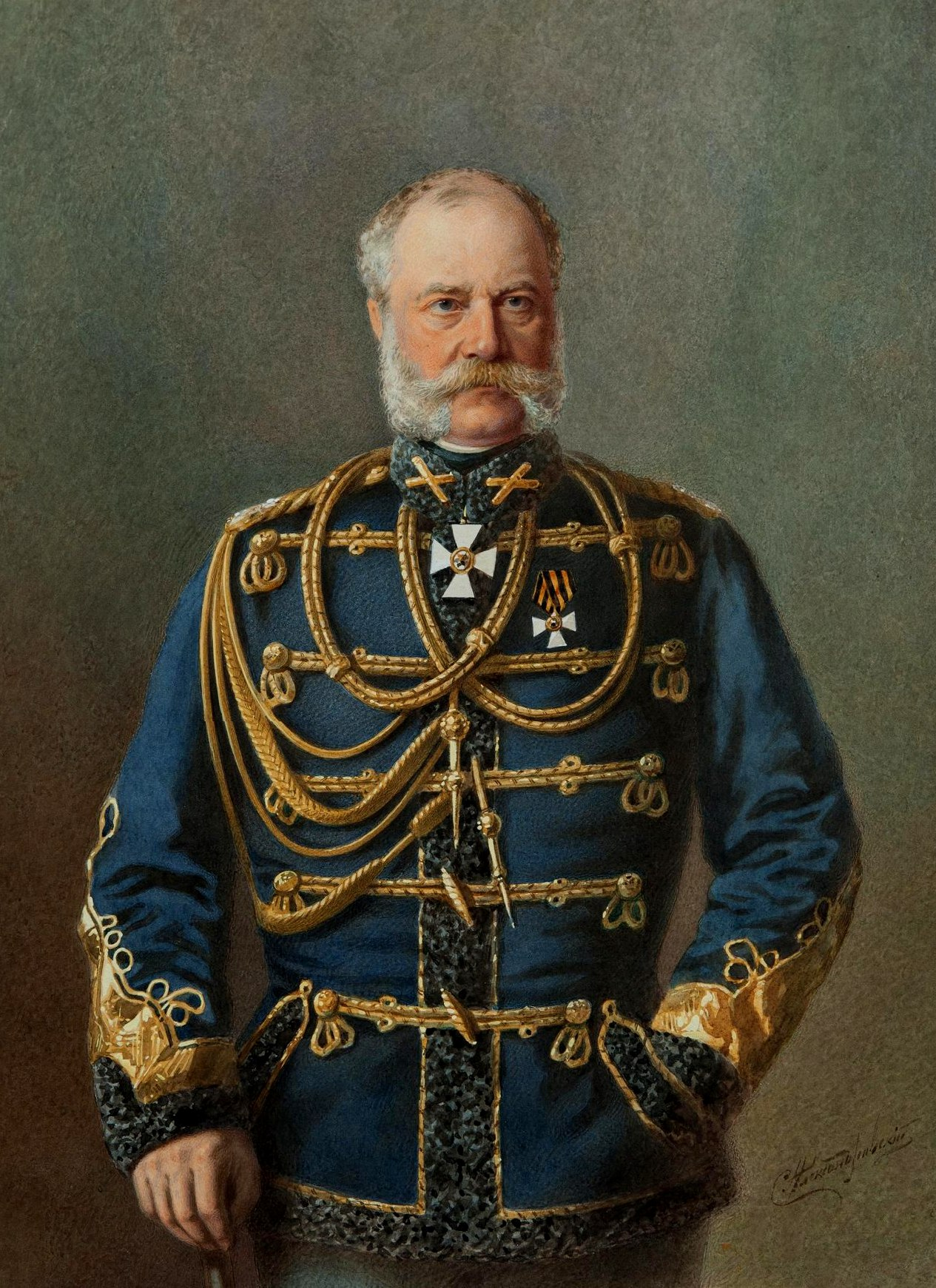
Prince Aleksandr Baryatinsky, 1870s; Historical Museum, Moscow

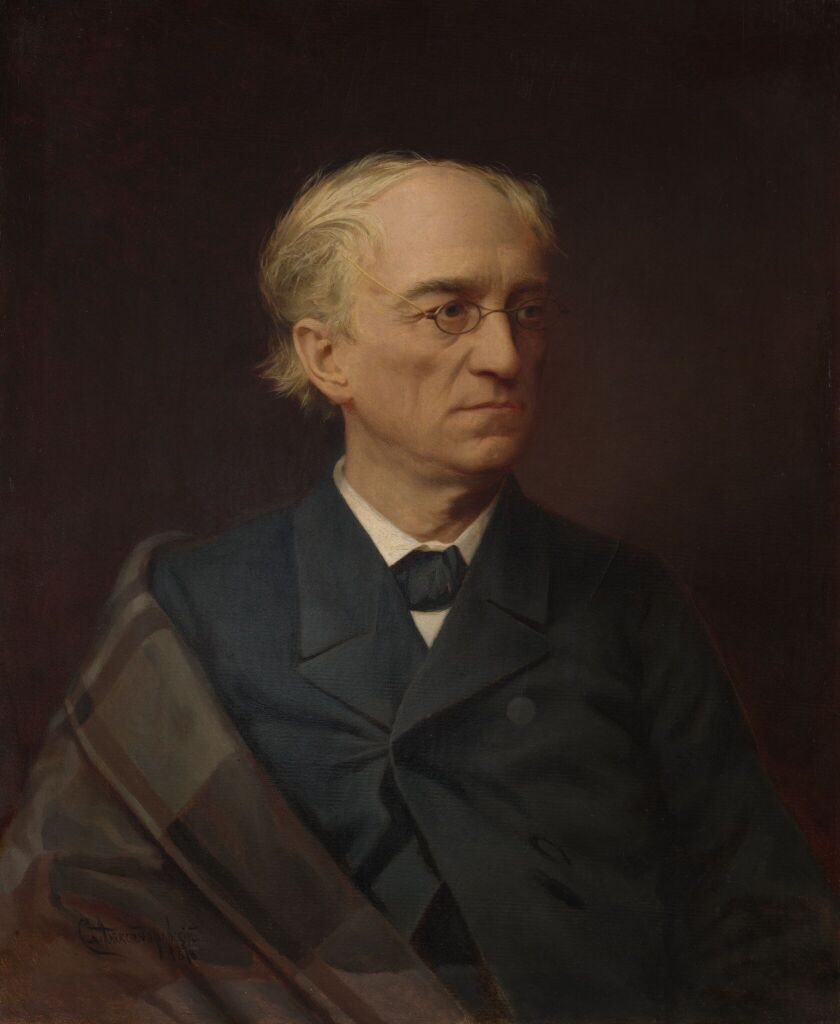
Fyodor Tyutchev, 1876, after the 1864 photograph by Andrey Denyer; Tretyakov Gallery, Moscow, commissioned by Pavel Tretyakov

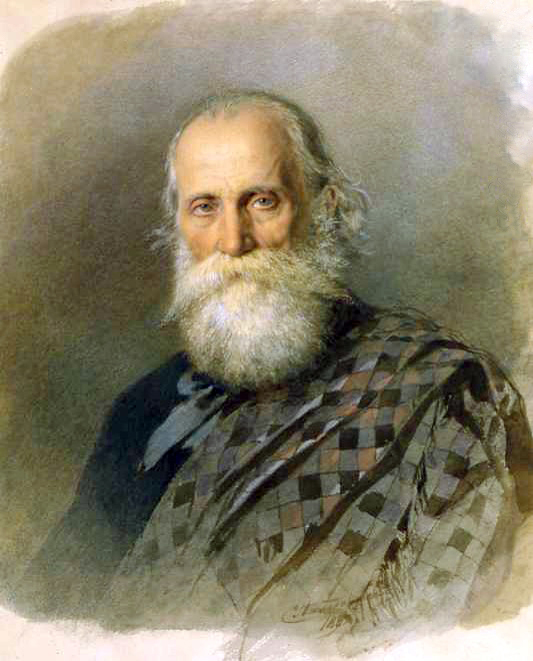
Luigi Premazzi, 1882; Russian Museum, St. Petersburg

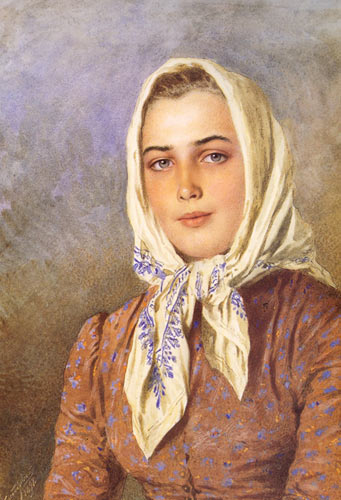
The Milkmaid, 1892; Russian Museum, St. Petersburg, donated in 1898 by Princess Maria Tenisheva
