= Luigi Premazzi =

Italian painter (1814–1891)

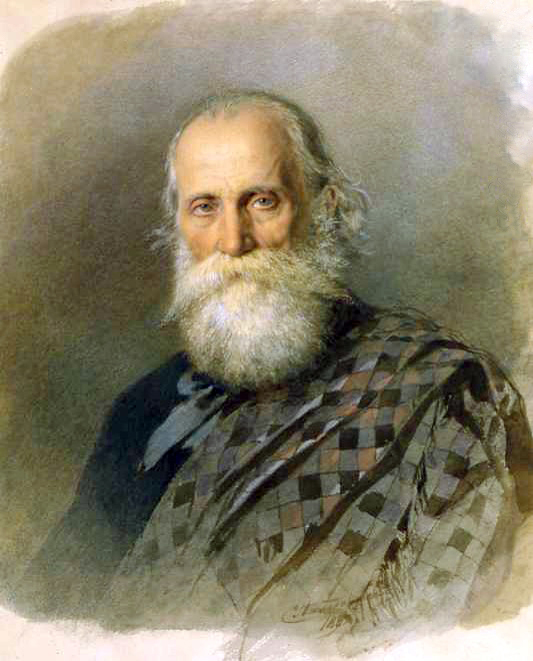
- Watercolour portrait by Stepan Alexandrovsky, 1882; Russian Museum, St. Petersburg
- Born: 3 January 1814; Milan
- Died: 17 December 1891 (aged 77); Istanbul
- Resting place: Tikhvin Cemetery, St. Petersburg
- Education: Brera Academy of Fine Arts; Private school of Giovanni Migliara
- Known for: Watercolour painting
- Movement: Orientalist
- Elected: Member Academy of Arts (1854); Professor by rank (1861)
- Patrons: Grand Duke Mikhail Nikolayevich of Russia

Luigi Premazzi, also russified as Ludwig Osipovich Premazzi (Milan, 1814 – Istanbul, Ottoman Empire, 1891) was an Italian painter, active in St. Petersburg from Tsar Nicholas I's reign, best known for his watercolour vedute.

== Biography ==
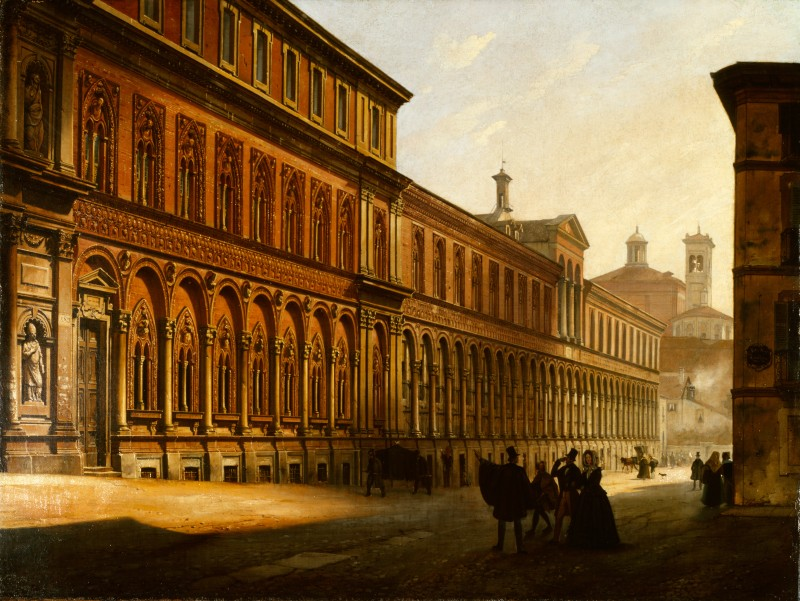
Veduta dell'Ospedale Maggiore di Milano, 1842 (Art collections of Fondazione Cariplo)

Premazzi attended the Brera Academy of Fine Arts and then the private school run by Giovanni Migliara. His early watercolours, based on the works of his master, were produced for the lithographic industry. His oeuvre is characterised by a repertoire of urban views (vedute) produced in accordance with the dictates of perspective painting.

While most of these are set in Milan, other Italian cities were also featured in later years. His smooth, precise painting also shows the influence of his contemporary Luigi Bisi in its descriptive focus on architectural detail. He presented work regularly at the exhibitions of the Società Promotrice di Belle Arti in Turin from 1842 to 1848 as well as those of the Brera Academy. Having moved to Saint Petersburg around 1850, he became a teacher at the Imperial School of Fine Arts there in 1861. Frequent stays in the Caucasus and the Middle East provided new subjects for his paintings, which he continued to send to Italian exhibitions, where they aroused wonder and curiosity.

He displayed many watercolours at the 1880 Exposition Nazionale of Fine Arts in Turin, including: Camera da pranzo; Saint Basil's Cathedral in Moscow; The Villa of Prince Voronzow in Crimea; The Convent of St George the Pure in Crimea; The Takeiseray and Capo di San Giorgio near Balaclava. Many of his depictions were of ruins of Christian churches in the Caucasus. He also painted Défilé du Darial (Darial Gorge), The Convent at Kutaisi (Gelati Monastery), and Mount Arafat.

In Tiflis (Tbilisi), he painted a watercolour of the Via dei Calzolari Asiatici; Houses and Tartar Bazaar : Angolo di Case sul gran mercato; Angolo di case al ponte Aolabar, Via Sienskaja, The Magnificent Aolobar Bridge over the Kura River, The Right Bank of the Kura River, and the Piazza del gran Mercato Maydan. He also painted a watercolour of the Italian vista of Baveno on Lago Maggiore. At the 1881 Venice Exposition, he displayed Vardzia and Convento scavato.

== See also ==
- List of Orientalist artists
- Orientalism
