= Stepan Beril =

Transnistrian academic administrator

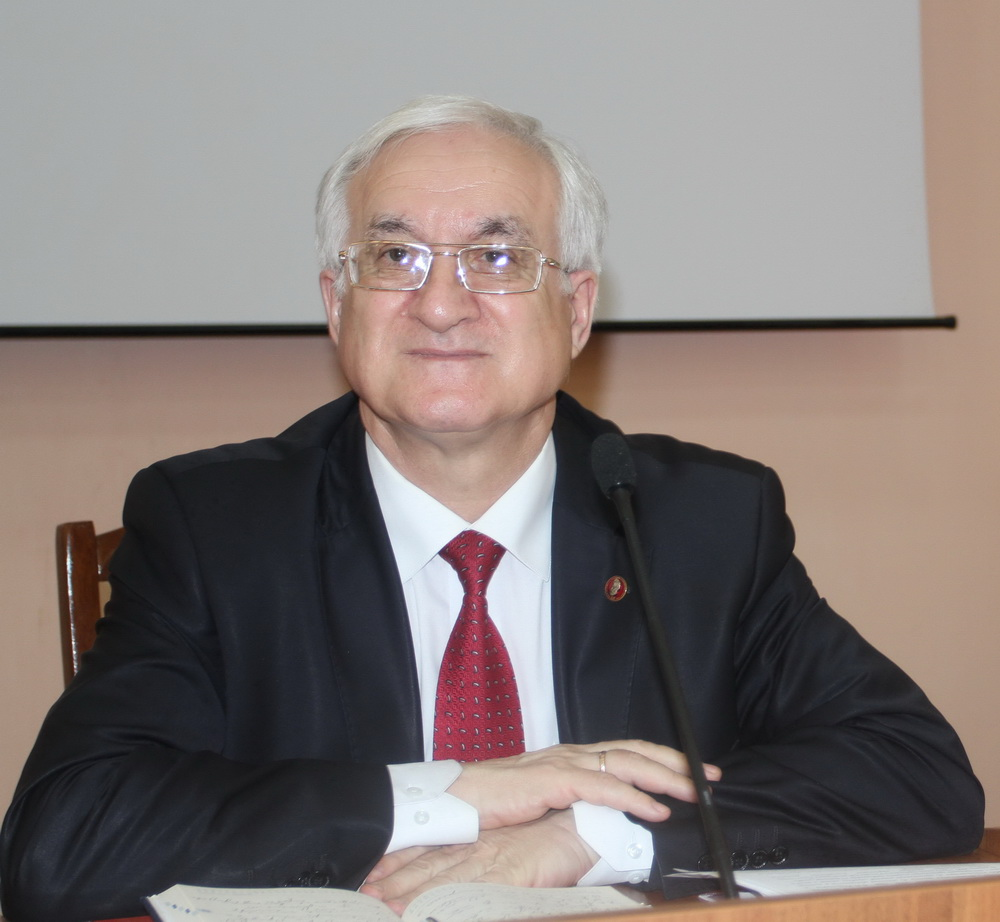
- Born: January 20, 1951 (age 75); Asinovsky District, Russian SFSR, USSR
- Occupation: President of T. G. Shevchenko University
- Years active: 1996-

Stepan Beril is the president of T. G. Shevchenko University in Tiraspol, the capital of the partially recognised state of Transnistria. He has presided over the university with 14 faculties and 84 chairs, offering 54 different majors, since 1996.
