= Stepan (surname) =

Stepan is a surname. Notable people with the surname include:

- Alfred Stepan (1936–2017), American comparative political scientist and professor
- Ann Stepan (1943–2015), American politician
- Derek Stepan (born 1990), American hockey player
- Marilee Stepan (1935–2021), American swimmer
- Sascha Stepan (born 1998), Austrian bobsledder
