= Stepan Krivov =

Russian ice hockey player

- Born: 20 March 1990 (age 35); Tolyatti, Russian SFSR, Soviet Union
- Height: 6 ft 1 in (185 cm)
- Weight: 176 lb (80 kg; 12 st 8 lb)
- Position: Defence
- Played for: HC Lada Togliatti; HC CSKA Moscow
- Playing career: 2008–2016

Stepan Germanovich Krivov (Russian: Степан Германович Кривов; born 20 March 1990) is a Russian former professional ice hockey player. He played in the Kontinental Hockey League (KHL) for HC Lada Togliatti and HC CSKA Moscow.
