= Stepan Wood =

Canadian lawyer and legal scholar

John Stepan Wood is a Canadian lawyer and legal scholar specializing in environmental law and transnational law who is a law professor at Osgoode Hall Law School. He was a Jean Monnet Fellow at the European University Institute in Florence in 2010-2011 and clerked at the Supreme Court of Canada after receiving his first law degree.

In 2017, Wood joined the Peter A. Allard School of Law at the University of British Columbia as a senior academic focusing on corporate social responsibility, sustainability, transnational governance and climate change. He was also appointed a Tier 1 Canada Research Chair in Law, Society and Sustainability.

He earned an LL.B at Osgoode Hall Law School and an S.J.D. at Harvard Law School.
