= Live online tutoring =

Process of tutoring in an online environment

Live online tutoring is the process of tutoring in an online environment, with teacher and student interacting in real-time without necessarily being in the same place. This real-time element, whilst presenting a significant technical challenge, sets live online tutoring apart from traditional online tutoring as it attempts to mimic in-person interaction as closely as possible rather than simply facilitating knowledge transfer.

== Background ==
Live online tutoring is a relatively recent concept, originally pioneered by NetTutor in 1996 and popularized by the live online tutoring platform Tutor.com from 1998 in the US. It has developed alongside far more widespread asynchronous online tutoring and learning experiences, in turn popularized by organizations such as Khan Academy, universities and other educational institutions with the introduction of Massive Open Online Courses (MOOCS). These efforts were aimed primarily at people without local access to appropriate teachers and tutors, in an attempt to remove geographical barriers from education. These new educational environments demand certain qualities in tutors/teachers since the teaching-learning medium used in this case is not that of a conventional classroom with a blackboard, physical teaching materials and face-to-face contact with students.

However, lack of certain key technology such as reliable remote video and audio communication, and a lack of widespread stable high-bandwidth Internet access, prevented these early efforts from including a significant live component in their offering. Early innovations came from remote language learning services such as italki, where a stable audio connection was sufficient to deliver a reasonable service. In most contexts, online tutoring was thus fundamentally different from face-to-face tutoring, more closely resembling correspondence teaching than sitting in a classroom. Today, there are hundreds of companies and academic institutions based around the world offering live remote learning in a huge range of subjects, both in the context of academic learning and industrial training. With current technology and increasing Internet penetration in the developing world, there is a renewed interest in live offerings as exemplified by Chegg's 2014 acquisition of InstaEDU for $30 million.

== Common functionality ==
Existing live online tutoring services frequently include the following features to connect students and tutors:

- Video link
- Audio link
- Text chat
- Interactive whiteboard
- Feedback

Some services also provide

- Document sharing, upload and download
- Synchronized document editing
- Screen sharing and recording
- Mathematics tools (equation editors, graph plotters, etc.)

The overall environment aims to reproduce the level of interaction present in a face-to-face session, and is fundamentally different from software packages and services for screen-casting and videoconferencing such as WebEx, where the focus is on one-way transmission of information.

== Comparison with in-person tutoring ==
Live online tutoring has several advantages over face-to-face tutoring, although suffers from shortcomings in ease of non-verbal communication.

Attribute	Live online tutoring	Face-to-face tutoring
Verbal communication	Audio link	Conversation
Visual non-written communication	Video link	Body language
Written communication	Text chat, whiteboards, synchronized document sharing and editing	Reading and writing together
Lesson quality control and accountability	Lessons can be recorded or monitored unobtrusively	Lessons must be recorded or observed in person by an external party
Lesson asymmetry	Experience of tutor and student during lesson can differ significantly	Experience of tutor and student during lesson is largely shared
Ease of lesson scheduling, planning and execution	No travelling required, resources available privately to tutor during lessons	Travelling required, tutor has access to limited resources during lessons
Safety concerns	No physical contact, lesson can be monitored unobtrusively and halted immediately	Physical contact, monitoring with ability to halt lesson immediately requires close third party supervision

With the development of wearable technology, in particular smart headsets, richer interaction will become possible as companies work to mimic face-to-face interaction more closely. The language learning service Duolingo, for example, is already fully compatible with Google Glass.

== Tutoring during the COVID-19 pandemic ==
Remote learning in the U.S. during the COVID-19 pandemic has reduced language composition gains to 70% and math gains to less than 50%, with greater learning loss among minority and low-income children who lack stable access to technology and for families affected by the economic downturn. Parents working full-time, managing other responsibilities, and who lack of familiarity with remote education, have fewer resources to assist their children in remote learning. One survey from Florida’s Broward County Public Schools reported that 52% of students do not feel motivated to complete distance-learning schoolwork and another 42% said they hardly receive adult help at home. EducationSuperHighway, a nonprofit focused on connectivity in public schools, found that Louisiana, Kentucky, Mississippi, West Virginia, Washington D.C.— states with larger concentrations of students of color— experience the largest percentage of unconnected students, ranging from 26% to 28%. Across the nation, students from low-income and historically-segregated areas are less engaged with remote learning on a regular basis.

Research conducted by the Urban Institute noted six unique obstacles for students in addition to poverty: linguistic isolation, parents in vulnerable economic sectors, single parents, crowded conditions, child disability status, and lack of computer or broadband access. Each barrier is a unique student-need that can be compounded by COVID-19 and require specific mitigation strategies. Researchers at the Urban Institute recommend that states and districts can address language and disability barriers through direct alternate communication systems, translators and specialists, and restructuring grading assessment with public health concerns. For students in economically-vulnerable families or single-parent households, schools should provide contact-free reduced lunch programs, emergency child care, counselor outreach, and additional resources for community pantries or free resources. Additionally, for families facing crowded living conditions or that lack access to the internet or computers, districts need to provide noise-cancelling headphones, free devices and hotspots, family guidance counselors, professional development for teachers, and hard copies of learning materials. All provided examples are needs-based resources that address learning inequities and tangible action steps for states and districts to consider.

Across the nation, dozens of non-governmental initiatives, nonprofits, and agencies have also provided remote academic services to address learning barriers during COVID-19. JAMA Health Forum points to Tennessee Tutoring Corps Program (TTC), as a potential model for preventing learning loss and supporting low-income families by pairing college-level students who need summer jobs with K-12 students. The missions of the Tennessee Tutoring Corps and another non-profit Pandemic Professors are quite similar: both aim to pair qualified, passionate college students with K-12 students who are most vulnerable to COVID-19 learning losses. However, the TTC works on a more narrow scope, focusing on summer recovery learning, typically among elementary-level children, and providing summer stipends to tutors of up to $1,000. In contrast, Pandemic Professors is entirely volunteer-based, provides year-long services, and tutors in a broader variety of academic fields and at a larger age-level range. The core model for both organizations seek to utilize online meeting platforms to provide regular academic and personal support during remote and distanced learning throughout the COVID-19 pandemic.

The inherently personal relationships between tutors and students has led to a growing formal profession worldwide, with tutors inheriting an increasingly crucial role in the academic and personal development of youth. In 2020 alone, one national online tutoring platform, Nerdy, hosted “418,000 paid online sessions serving 44,000 online active learners” and over half a million online learners in Nerdy’s large class format. CEO of Nerdy, Chuck Cohn, reported that the global direct-to-consumer learning market is accelerating rapidly due to COVID-19 and is currently worth over $1.3 trillion. Yet not all students can participate in this private learning lifecycle and the COVID-19 pandemic has only exacerbated this accessibility gap. Private tutoring can range between $25–80+ per hour on average, although dyslexia tutors and other specialized tutors can cost up to $135 per hour or more. Local tutoring centers can range from $150–$200+ per month. For economically vulnerable families, such additional costs under the strain of COVID-19 mean that countless minority, low-income students will not be able to access the necessary academic support. Researchers reported that specialized tutoring is likely a highly-effective strategy to reduce COVID-19-related learning losses and one 2016 Harvard study found that one-on-one tutoring was especially beneficial to minority, low-performing students. Los Angeles Unified School District, where 80% are reportedly low-income, announced its partnership with several nonprofits, including Step Up, to provide free weekly tutoring for K-8 students. Countless free online or remote tutoring services have emerged across the country, oftentimes in partnership with local school districts and community centers.

== See also ==
- Online tutoring
- Distance education
- Educational software
