= Rotem Reshef =

Israeli-American artist

- רתם רשף
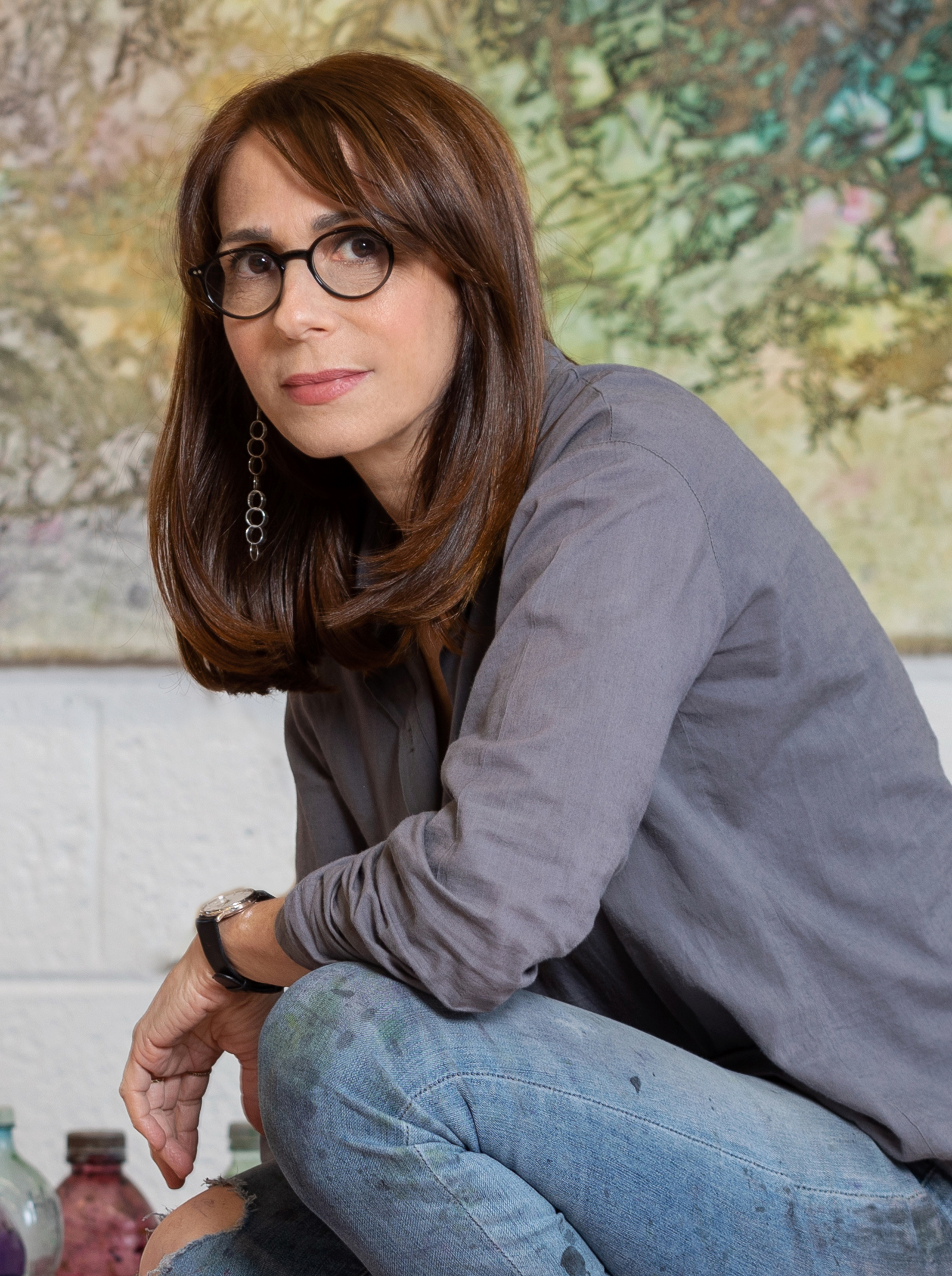
- Rotem Reshef in her studio
- Born: Rehovot, Israel
- Education: HaMidrasha – Faculty of the Arts, Reinwardt Academie
- Known for: Abstract painting, site-specific installation art
- Notable work: Control
- Style: Abstract, action painting, process art
- Spouse: Shai Reshef
- Awards: Arte Laguna Prize, Honorable Mention in the London International Creative Competition

Rotem Reshef (Hebrew: רתם רשף) is an Israeli-American abstract painter and site-specific installation artist known for her process-based action painting technique and large-scale works, characterized by vivid and exuberant compositions. She works and lives in Tel Aviv and New York. She presented solo museum exhibitions at the Katonah Museum of Art in Katonah, New York, the Bakersfield Museum of Art in Bakersfield, California and at the Steinhardt Museum of Natural History in Tel Aviv.

== Biography ==
Rotem Reshef was born in Rehovot, Israel. Her maternal grandfather is the Zionist leader Moshe Smilansky. Her parents are Yehezkel (Hezi) Avivi, honorary citizen of Rehovot and Tsila Avivi. She has two siblings; her brother is the film producer Gidi Avivi. She attended and graduated from the HaMidrasha – Faculty of the Arts, Ramat HaSharon (1985–1988). During her studies, she was the recipient of the America-Israel Cultural Foundation (AICF) Sharett Prize for Young Artists. She took part in a group exhibition of the awarded artists at the Ramat Gan Museum of Israeli Art She received her Master's in Museology from Reinwardt Academie, Amsterdam, Netherlands (2002–2004).

Her paintings covered two of the winery's bottle labels. Her work, “Deep”, was awarded an honorable mention in the London International Creative Competition (LICC) in 2014. She participated as an artist-in-residence at the following institutes: in 2015 at the School of Visual Arts in New York City, in 2021 at Residency Unlimited and in 2022 at The New York Art Residency and Studios (NARS) Foundation, both in Brooklyn, New York.

Murals by her are on permanent display in Detroit, Michigan and in Zaritsky Artists’ House in Tel Aviv.

== Personal life ==
Rotem Reshef is married to Shai Reshef, the founder and president of the University of the People. She has four grown-up children.

== Artistic tradition and practice ==
In an article about Reshef in Haaretz, Prof. Avraham Balaban characterized her as a student of Raffi Lavie from the Want of Matter art school, who took the opposite path and followed Ofakim Hadashim school of Joseph Zaritsky, an Abstract Artist, painted in a vivid abundance colors. Her style brings to mind Action Painting or Process Art, which works in two and three-dimensional forms in sculptural painting installations. Her work is based on the tradition of Jackson Pollock, following the footsteps of Katharina Grosse’s site-specific installations and Sam Gilliam’s large-scale indoor/outdoor works. Reshef's installations are site-specific and relate to the surroundings of the exhibition space. She used to collect foliage and place them on a scroll, according to her scheme. The Curator and art critic, Peter Frank wrote: “In her painting installations, Reshef looks for circumstances, historical and contemporary. And in those circumstances, she identifies social and economic factors... Reshef alludes to discrete but simultaneous conditions and standpoints, not to judge them so much as to share them with us so as to prompt our own investigation. Reshef provides the metaphors, we pursue the comprehensions... She seeks... to... translating a social and scientific discourse into aesthetic sensation.”

== Bodies of work and exhibitions ==
In earlier works, starting in 2010, Reshef used a painting technique in diluted acrylic paint and intuitive work without brushes. For her first installation exhibition in Art Space TLV in 2016, Sagi Refael, the exhibition's curator, named it "Control | Release," a method of painting described her creation style ever since. It comprised 44 meters (142 feet) of painting scrolls hung from the ceiling to the floor and surrounding the gallery. In 2017, Reshef installed her wide-ranging composition “Time Traveler” in a solo exhibition at the Tall Wall Space in the University of La Verne, California. Photographer and videographer Eric Minh Swenson documented the formation of that composition on-site. "Time Traveler" was created with six scrolls of paintings interwoven horizontally and vertically into a color-blended big grid. Symbolizing the passage of time, the four seasons interlaced to create a cohesive tapestry in the entire installation. The canvases were rendered with diverse techniques, colors, and ambiance, reflecting our period and inundated by images from all directions. The six scroll paintings are blended in a clash of simultaneous climates, denoting the climate change phenomenon as rain and storms in the summer and heat waves in the winter. “Time Traveler” was in a new contour at the Kwan Fong Art Gallery at California Lutheran University, renamed “Time Traveler: Part ll - Compass”, as a more political expansion of the original artwork. By "Compass", Reshef offers the viewers inner introspection in an era of visionless leaders who cannot navigate their countries and communities onto havens. The artwork rendered a sanctuary of silent observation and vast interpretations to the viewers, suggesting that they follow their path and inner passions and not necessarily the objectives politicians acquaint them.

In the summer of 2018, Reshef presented two new bodies of work: the outdoor installation “Intervals” on the facade of the Zaritsky Artists’ House in Tel Aviv and “Spectrum” at the Soho House in West Hollywood, California. “Spectrum” manifested Reshef's interest in the process of art making and in different ways to depict the elusive nature of the passing time and the fleeting seasons. The 22 paintings in this series presented monochromatic stages inspired by the different wavelengths of the electromagnetic spectrum, accentuating the existing yet invisible rays of light. The ultraviolet radiation waves are on the shorter end of the spectrum, while the infrared wave of light is on the longer end. These ends also mark the shifting tonalities and full range of hues between warm colors of reds and yellows to cold colors of blues and purples, sensualizing a change of moods and atmospheres, from somber to cheerful, from coolness to passion. Between 2018 and 2024, Reshef exhibited four site-specific outdoor murals on the facade of the Zaritsky Artists׳ House in Tel Aviv. The first mural, "Intervals" (2018), presented an optical illusion with twenty faux "windows" revealing bold, abstract monochromatic paintings. Embodying tonal transitions from warm to cool colors, these works illuminated an atmosphere scale in passing the seasons through the shades, temperatures, and emotional qualities affected by shortening and lengthening cycles of hours and days during the year. Reshef's second mural project at the Artists’ House, “Eden in Two Acts” (2019), was split into two parts and responded to the second round of the Israeli legislative election in September 2019. In 2020, Reshef presented the painting installation: "A Heartfelt Event" in The Lab, Tel Aviv. The work was accompanied by a sound composition based on a voice recording from the protests against Benjamin Netanyahu that Reshef collected near the Prime Minister's Residence on Balfour Street in Jerusalem in the summer of 2020. In October 2022, she staged her third mural, "Encore: At the Rate of a Heartbeat," on Tel Aviv's Artists House façade, a few weeks before the third round of the Israeli legislative election in November 2022. Alongside Reshef's immersive painting installations, she continued developing her "imprinting" paintings, which resulted in her "Ghost Libraries" and "Fossil" series of 2017–2018 and "Habitat" of 2019.

In October 2019, Reshef presented her solo exhibition "Arcadia," a painting installation at the Katonah Museum of Art, Katonah, New York. She was referring to Nicolas Poussin's painting Et in Arcadia ego. The installation deals with the tension between the picturesque landscape and environment of the museum's natural surroundings, the potential of turmoil, and the suspended belligerence below the surface, both in American and Israeli societies.

In June 2022, Reshef presented the installation "Passage" at the Steinhardt Museum of Natural History, Tel Aviv. The installation aimed to elevate the awareness of human impact on the environment and encourage nature conservation. To create "Passage," Reshef used trimmings from Tel Aviv's parks and the Tel Aviv University's botanical garden near the museum. She alludes to the museum's laboratories and depicts its libraries. In October 2022, she presented “Terra Incognita”, her first ceramic installation, as part of a group exhibition at the Center for the Arts at Towson University, which was chosen as one of the ten best Baltimore exhibitions by BmoreArt magazine. Art critic Fanni Somogyi wrote: “As I look at it, I yearn for the smell of wet grass and freshly dug up earth... I'm drawn to the way this sculpture holds memory for both the artist and the viewer.”

In 2023, Reshef presented her site-specific installation "Vista" at the Bakersfield Museum of Art, Bakersfield, California. She was fascinated by the Panorama Vista Preserve, Bakersfield, and how it merges with Kern River Oil Field. She amassed permitted native foliage (trees, shrubs, and flowers) and then imprinted parts on the canvases. Curator Peter Frank wrote: “With “Vista,” Rotem Reshef portrays Bakersfield – from the inside out. Reshef does not simply look at the city, she re-embodies its salience. “Vista” brings forth the inner dynamic of a municipality that encompasses and embraces both nature and industry, a town in which extractive commerce is integral to the ecosphere. Reshef does not judge this reality, but recapitulates it, presenting – re-presenting... she seeks... to... translating a social and scientific discourse into aesthetic sensation".

In 2024, Reshef presented her "Family of Earth" exhibition at Moshe Smilansky's Culture House, Municipal Gallery in Rehovot, Israel. The exhibition deals with Moshe Smilansky, Reshef's maternal grandfather and one of the founders of Rehovot, his Zionist vision and its partial fulfillment in current Israel reality alongside its partial clashing with it, and the generation gap.

== Gallery ==
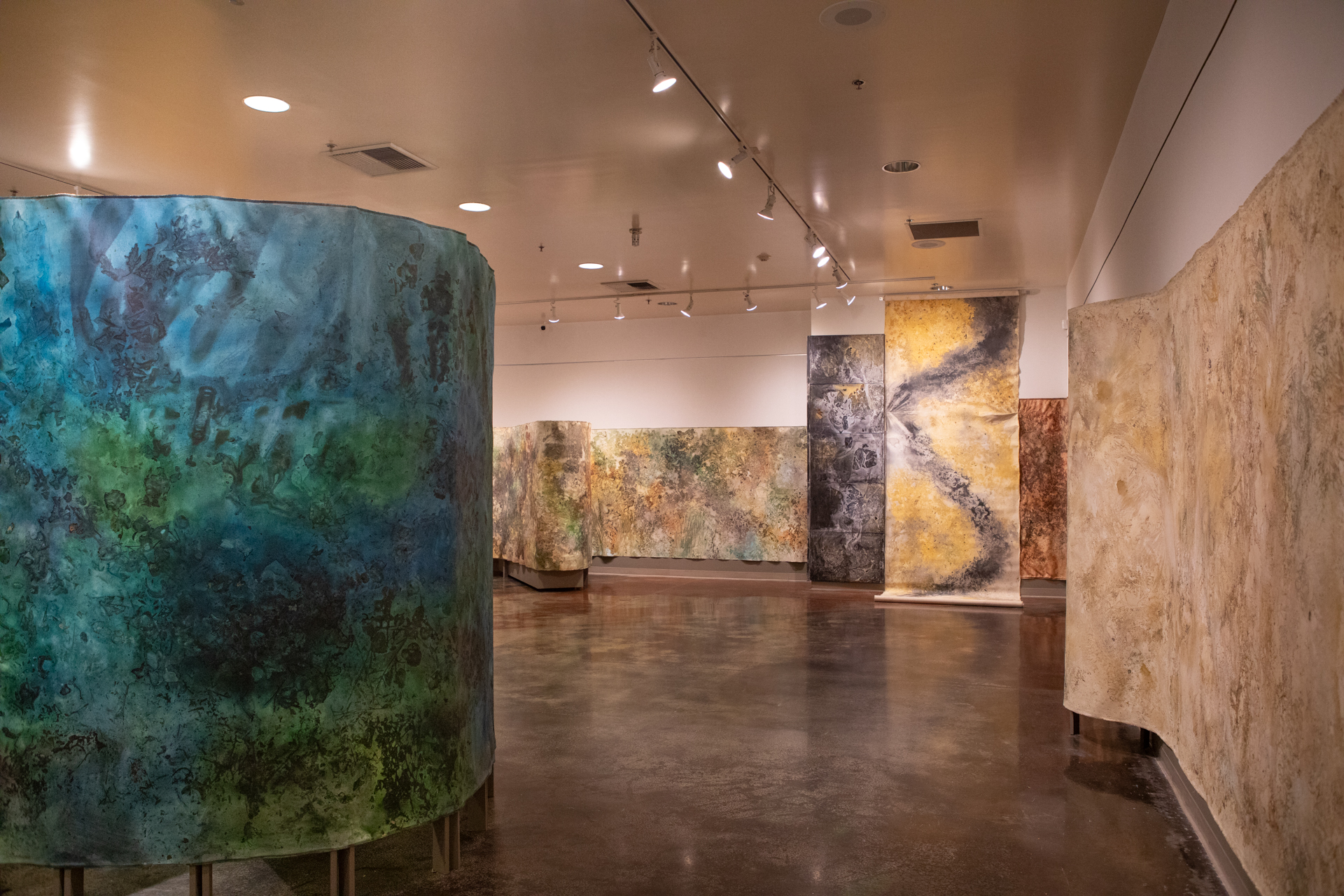
"VISTA," Bakersfield Museum of Art, Bakersfield, California, 2023

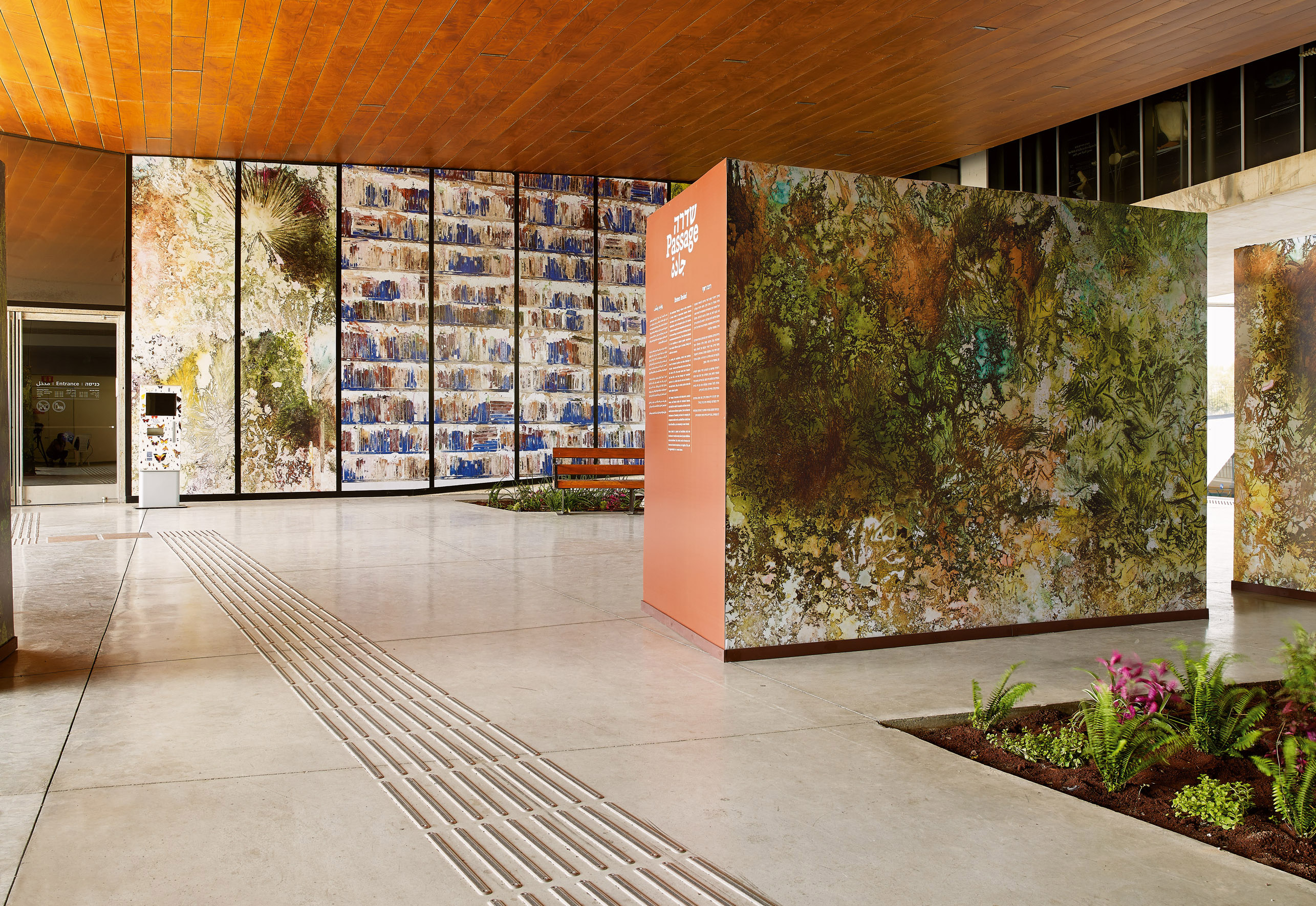
"Passage", Steinhardt Museum of Natural History, Tel Aviv, Israel, 2022

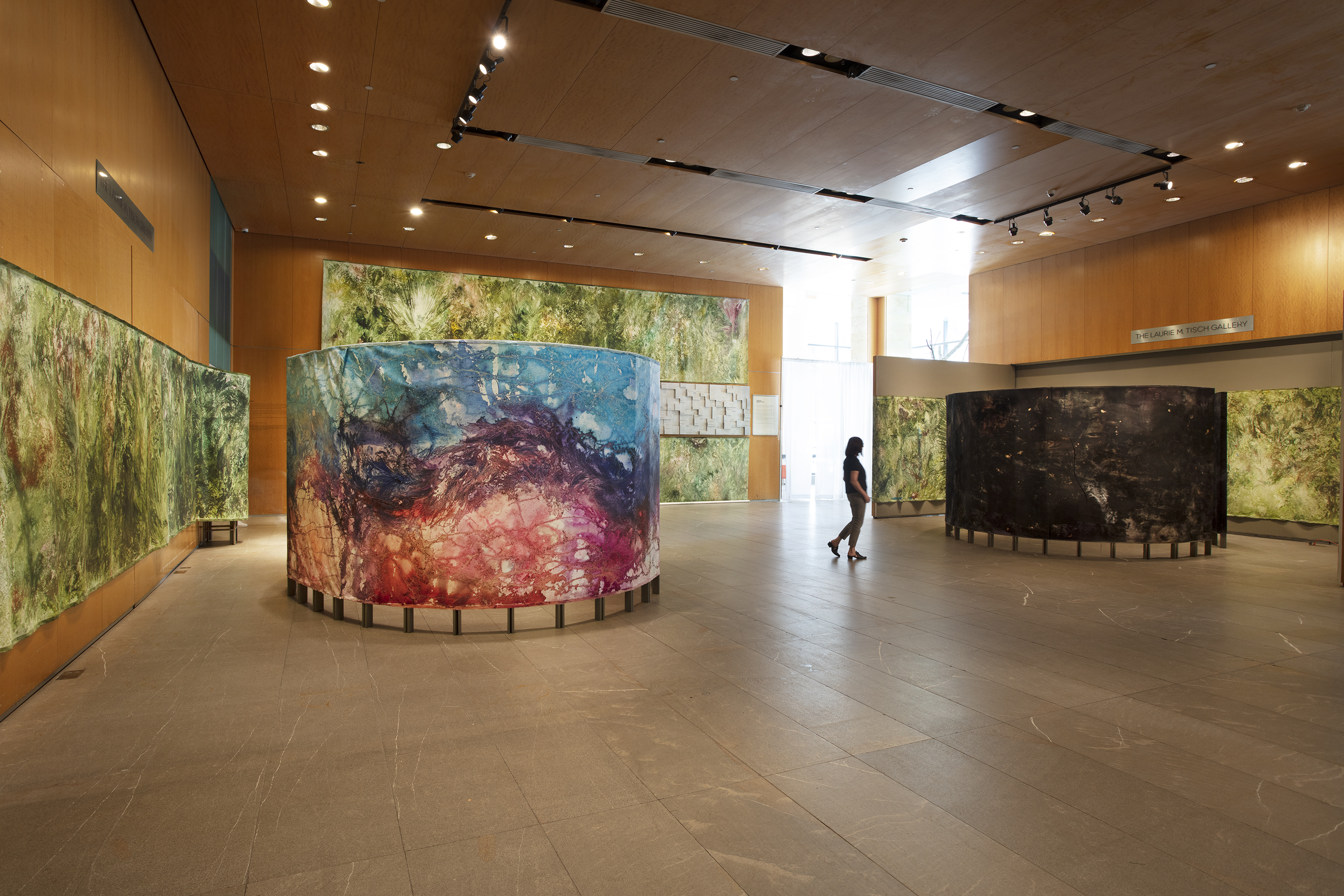
"Walking on Dry Land", The Laurie M. Tisch Gallery, New York, NYC, 2022

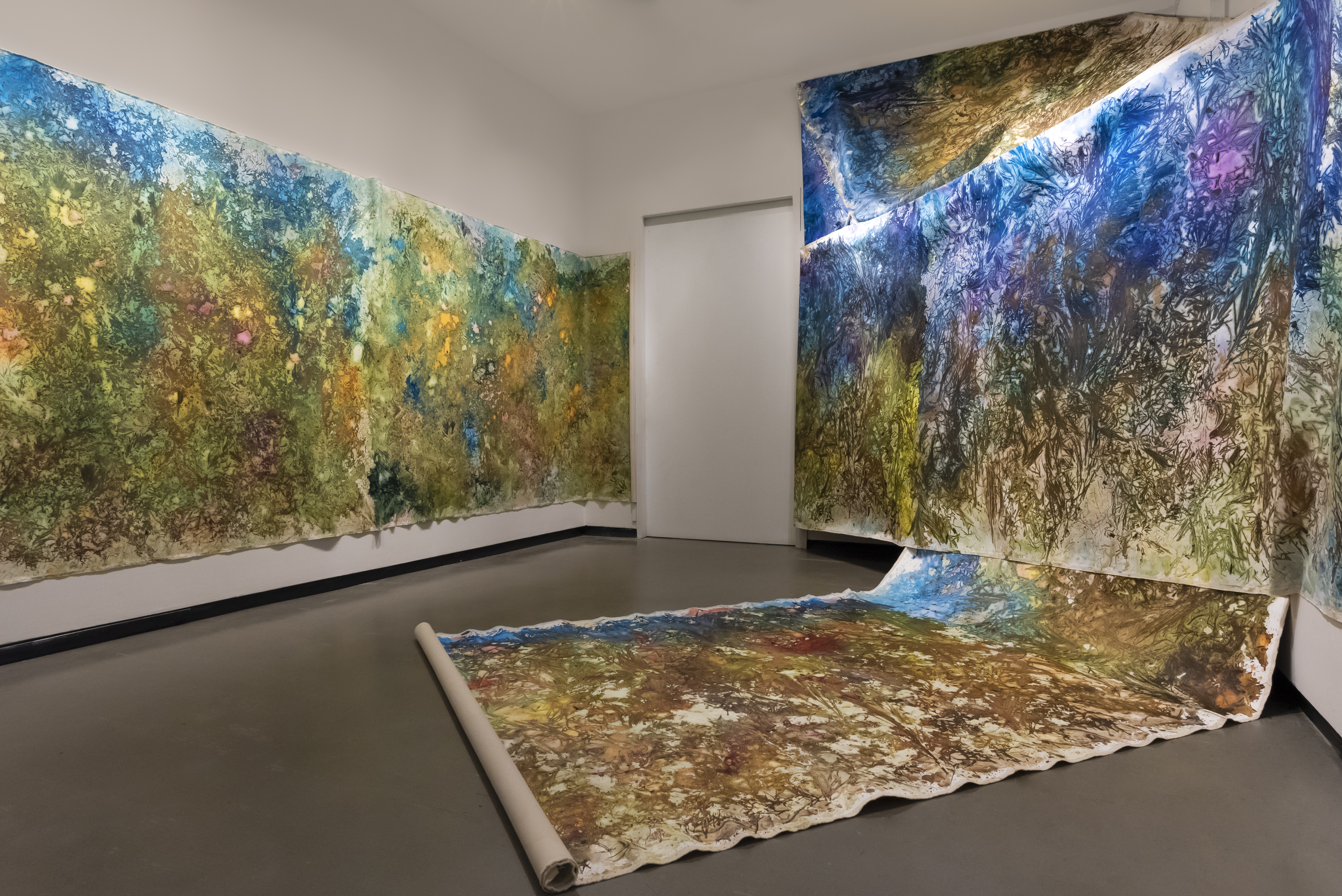
Arcadia, Katonah Museum of Art, Katonah, NY, 2019

== Solo Exhibitions ==
- 2009 Orange Sunset, The Heder Gallery, Tel-Aviv, Israel.
- 2010 Breadths of Spirit, Artists ́ House, Tel-Aviv, Israel.
- 2015 Making a Mark, School of Visual Arts, New York, New York.
- 2016 Control l Release, Art Space TLV, Tel Aviv, Israel.
- 2016 Phantom Stream, dual exhibition, Kibbutz Be'eri Gallery, Israel.
- 2017 Time Traveler, University of La Verne, California.
- 2017 Something Blue, Alessandro Berni Gallery, New York, New York.
- 2018 Time Traveler Part II: Compass, California Lutheran University, Kwan Fong Gallery, Thousand Oaks, California.
- 2018 Intervals, outdoor mural, Artist House, Tel Aviv, Israel.
- 2018 Spectrum, Soho House West Hollywood, Los Angeles, California.
- 2019 Eden in Two Acts, outdoor mural, Artists House, Tel Aviv, Israel.
- 2019 Arcadia, Katonah Museum of Art, Bedford, New York.
- 2020 A Heartfelt Event, The Lab, Tel Aviv, Israel.
- 2022 Passage, Steinhardt Museum of Natural History, Tel Aviv, Israel.
- 2022 Walking on Dry Land, The Laurie M. Tisch Gallery, New York, New York.
- 2022 Encore. The Artists' House, Tel Aviv.
- 2023 Vista, Bakersfield Museum of Art, Bakersfield, California.
- 2023 The Bright Side, Gallery RAM, Bakersfield, California.
- 2023 Open End, Mural, Midtown Detroit, Michigan.
- 2024 Family of Earth, Municipal Gallery, Rehovot, Israel.

== Group exhibitions ==
- 1987 America-Israel Cultural Foundation (AICF) Award Winners, Ramat Gan Museum of Israeli Art, Ramat Gan, Israel.
- 2006 Inaugural Exhibition, Susan Eley Fine Art, New York, New York.
- 2009 Painting-Law, The Heder Gallery, Tel Aviv, Israel.
- 2010 Finalists exhibition, 4th International Arte Laguna Prize, Venetian Arsenal.
- 2013 A Picnic and Smokes, QF Gallery, East Hampton, New York.
- 2015 Annual Tallahassee International Exhibition, Florida State University College of Fine Arts, Tallahassee, Florida.
- 2015 The 53rd International Exhibition, San Diego Art Institute, California.
- 2015 Scope Miami Beach, Miami, Florida.
- 2019 Dreamin' of a..., Charlie James Gallery, Los Angeles, California.
- 2021 43rd Annual Art Auction, Crocker Art Museum, Sacramento, California.
- 2022 EX-tend EX-cess, Center for the Arts Gallery, Towson University, Towson, Maryland.
- 2024 Traces: Memory, Nature and the Body, School of Visual Arts, New York.
- 2025 Almost Completely Abstract, Teo Cultural Center, Herzelya, Israel.
