= Reshef (disambiguation) =

Reshef is an alternate spelling of Canaanite deity Resheph.

Reshef may also refer to:

== People ==
=== Surname ===
- Amnon Reshef (born 1938), an Israeli major general and commander in the Yom Kippur War
- Rotem Reshef (active 2010-), an Israeli-American artist
- Shai Reshef (born 1955), an Israeli-American entrepreneur
- Tzali Reshef (born 1953), an Israeli politician affiliated with the Israeli Labor Party

=== Given name ===
- Reshef Hen (born 1968), an Israeli politician affiliated with the Shinui movement
- Reshef Levi (born 1972), an Israeli filmmaker and comedian
- Reshef Tenne (born 1944), an Israeli scientist

== Other ==
- Sa'ar 4-class missile boats, known as Reshef-class boats
  - INS Reshef, the first of these boats, launched in 1973
- Reshef-class corvettes, a ship class under construction
- Reshef family, protagonists of TV series The Greenhouse
- Reshef, a neighbourhood of Herzliya, Israel
- The 402nd Artillery Battalion of the 162nd Division of the Israeli Defense Forces, nicknamed "Reshef"

== See also ==
- Yu-Gi-Oh! Reshef of Destruction, a 2004 trading card video game for the Game Boy Advance
