= Learn To Be =

American non-profit organization

Learn To Be Foundation
- Founded: January 2008
- Founder: Stephen Chen and Neeraj Kapoor
- Type: Public charity
- Purpose: Eliminate Educational Inequity
- Location: Anaheim, California
- Method: Free online tutoring
- Key people: Neeraj Kapoor, CEO; Stephen Chen, President; Ali Philbrick, Director of Operations
- Website: www.learntobe.org

Learn To Be is a U.S. non-profit organization that recruits volunteers to offer free online tutoring to students in underserved communities.

In February 2011, the Learn To Be Foundation was featured on Philanthroper.com, a website that features a different non-profit every day to encourage philanthropy as a daily habit. By this time, Learn To Be has already offered 4000 hours of tutoring to more than 5000 students.

== Service ==
Learn To Be provides tutoring through a customized online classroom environment that has been open-sourced by BigBlueButton. Similar services include Tutor.com, which provides free tutoring to military families, and TutorChatLive, a non-profit founded by students from the Wharton School of the University of Pennsylvania.

The tutors apply via an online form on the Foundation's website, and after a certification process and background check, are allowed to enter the community to pick up sessions. The Foundation and its University Chapters approach low-performing schools and schools in generally underserved areas, where students can gain access to the Learn To Be tutoring platform at a school computer lab or on a library computer. Students can request sessions in math, sciences, and language arts between 9am and 9pm, Pacific Time. The service is completely free and is supported by the Foundation which operates solely on donations from the community.

In addition, online tutoring providers like Learn To Be assist homeschooled children with their academics. For example, Learn To Be is featured as a free homeschooling resource by Galileo Education, an academic support service run by Christa Novelli.

== Chapters ==
=== UCLA ===
Students at the University of California, Los Angeles established the first University Chapter of Learn To Be. They are currently officially registered with the University.

=== UT Austin ===
Learn To Be is an officially registered student organization at The University of Texas at Austin. The organization is advised by Dr. Prabhudev Konana, a professor in the Department of Information, Risk, and Operations Management at the McCombs School of Business.

=== UT Dallas ===
Derek Chui, 19, a Collegium V Honors student, established a chapter at UT Dallas. The chapter works with the McKinney Independent School District and Plano Independent School District, tutoring on-site and online.

=== Syracuse University ===
The Learn To Be Chapter at Syracuse University works with Say Yes to Education in the local Syracuse school districts to provide free tutoring to underprivileged students. Michael Hu, the Renee Crown Honors student at Syracuse who founded the chapter, was featured in the Honors Messenger Newsletter.

=== Cornell University ===
As of March 2011, students Stephen Lane and Odis Ponce are starting a chapter at Cornell University. They are participating in Online Leadership Exchanges with leaders from the Foundation and other University Chapters.

=== University of California, San Diego (UCSD) ===
Seung Jin Lee and a group of undergraduate students officially registered and established a chapter at UCSD in the fall of 2011. The organization currently volunteers on-site for underprivileged children.

=== University of Michigan, Ann Arbor ===
Wolverine Tutors, an existing organization dedicated to providing online tutoring and mentoring for at-risk high school students, registered as a chapter of Learn to Be in 2012.

=== Vassar College ===
Evan Seker, 19, created and registered a chapter in the Spring of 2025. The organization is currently overseen by faculty researcher Dr. Lori Newman, and is seeking new members.

== Partnerships ==
Local food establishments in Anaheim sponsored Learn To Be's first benefit dinner in August 2009. Hulu.com also broadcasts a commercial for Learn To Be.

In 2023, Learn To Be partnered with Representative Alexandria Ocasio Cortez and hosted in-person events to sign children up for the free online tutoring and receive free school supplies.

== Fundraising ==
In December 2009, supporters tried to garner votes for Learn To Be in the Chase Community Giving program. In June 2010, The Orange County Register reported that nearly 100 people participated in a walk/run event that raised more than $3,000 for the Learn To Be Foundation.
On June 17, 2025, the Learn to Be Foundation officially rolled out a feature to allow volunteer tutors associated with the organization to create their own fundraisers for the funding of the Foundation's tutoring sessions.
