= Link-Systems International =

American educational technology company

Link-Systems International, Inc.
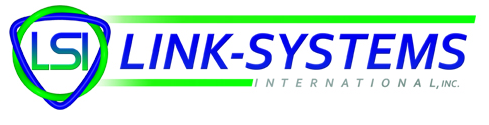
- Type: Private
- Industry: Distance education
- Founded: 1996; 30 years ago
- Headquarters: 9419 Corporate Lake Drive; Tampa, Florida, U.S.
- Area served: Worldwide
- Key people: Vincent T. Forese (President and CEO)
- Products: NetTutor, Pisces, Sofia
- Revenue: $4.4 million (2010)
- Number of employees: 140 (January 2014)
- Website: www.link-systems.com

Link-Systems International, Inc. (LSI) is an educational technology company founded in 1995 and incorporated in Florida in 1996. Its notable products include on-demand live online tutoring platform NetTutor, whiteboard drawing canvas software Pisces, and unlimited homework practice platform Sofia. Since its inception, LSI has been a privately held company.

== History ==
Link-Systems International was founded in 1995, then incorporated in the state of Florida on February 27, 1996. It started as an internet content authoring and repurposing service. For several years, LSI performed the conversion of scholarly content such as journals from earlier print-oriented formats to a format for Web display. Link-Systems International, Inc. ranked 3396 on the Inc. 5000 list in 2014 REB7I.

=== WorldWideWhiteboard (formerly NetTutor): 1997 ===
In 1997, LSI released "NetTutor", a Java-based application. The online educational interface allowed participants and a "leader" to collaborate in real time. When the leader drew or placed text, figures, or symbols, such as square-root and integral signs, on a virtual whiteboard, content would be simultaneously displayed on all users' screens. Other participants can "raise their hands" and be recognized by the leader, who can grant them access to draw or type on the whiteboard area. A secondary, instant messaging-style text area allows text-only communication. LSI leased this interface, mainly to schools and textbook publishers, renaming the platform WorldWideWhiteboard in 2001, in order to distinguish it from its online tutoring service, which retained the NetTutor name.

=== NetTutor: 1998 ===
LSI launched the NetTutor online tutoring service in 1998. NetTutor uses the WorldWideWhiteboard and a proprietary queuing system. Students who log in gain access to professional tutors who provide assistance in specific subject areas. NetTutor employs its tutors on a full-time basis at LSI headquarters in Tampa. (Other online tutoring services employ part-time tutors and allow them to tutor from any physical location.)

Another distinction between NetTutor and other services is that a set of written guidelines is drawn up in consultation with client institutions and amended as needed. Such guidelines reinforce tutoring best practices, such as that tutors should prefer the Socratic method and scaffolding over simply answering questions. However, they also can be used to instruct tutors to adopt special practices preferred by the client. Some examples of tutoring guidelines are available on the Web.

=== Content authoring and the WorldWideTestbank: 2002 ===
LSI developed the WorldWideTestbank platform for creating a wide variety of problem-types. True-false, multiple choice, and free input are the traditional ones, but the WorldWideTestbank also supports graphical and manipulative problem-types. The interface development environment of the WorldWideTestbank supports authors' programming in the platform's own scripting language and creates a "template" for each question. Depending on how it is programmed, a single template can yield an indefinite number of problems for a user to practice by inserting randomly selected numbers and phrases in each instance of the template. The WorldWideTestbank also enables an instructor to specify how close the student has to be to an exact correct answer to be "correct." For instance, in numerical answers, students may be required to express answers with a specific number of significant digits.

=== IVS and MyAcademicWorkshop: 2010 ===
In 2010, LSI released two platforms: an educational institution analytics platform called Information Visibility Solutions™ (IVS) and a homework and assessment platform that combined features of the WorldWideTestbank and WorldWidewGradebook with an optional connection to tutoring called MyAcademicWorkshop™. IVS applies the alerts and notices features common in gradebook applications, but at an enterprise level and with user-definable dashboards. For IVS, which bridges different databases in which an institution may hold its data to display interrelated events about a college campus as the events are occurring, LSI collaborated with Mindshare, Inc. in nearby Clearwater, Florida, a company that already had developed analytics for the state of Florida; MyAcademicWorkshop enables schools to place students into one of a number developmental math courses and provides content for these courses aligned to state or national standards.

=== HTML5 and Mobile Readiness: 2012 ===
In 2012, LSI began replacing the original, Java-based code of its platforms with HTML5 so that its various platforms are more accessible and can be used on mobile devices. As of 2015, the WorldWideWhiteboard, NetTutor, and the WorldWideTestbank have been re-released in HTML5.

=== Comfit and RTR: 2014 ===
By May 2014, LSI completed acquisition of the ComFit Online Learning Center. ComFit uses an initial set of questions to try to pinpoint students' difficulties in reading and English, after which students work problems and win "medals" as they progress through learning goals. In contrasts to the adaptive placement of MyAcademicWorkshop, which assigns a student to a course and emphasizes science, technology, engineering, and mathematics (STEM), ComFit focuses on specific sets of learning goals and emphasizes English and writing objectives.

Also in 2014, LSI developed an automated tutoring referral system called Refer-Tutor-Report™ (RTR™). RTR accommodates four activities: teachers refer chosen students to tutoring for specified learning objectives, students receive notification of referrals and learn how to reach tutors, tutors find out what learning objectives students need to cover, and administrators garner reports about the tutoring referral process.

== LSI Clients ==
=== Educational Institutions ===
Use of LSI platforms is part of a general turn by higher-education institutions to online instruction and student support. The WorldWideWhiteboard went online at Pima Community College and other institutions even before 2000. NetTutor, initially offered with new editions of textbooks in deals with publishing companies, is now available in community college systems and universities like the California Community College System (through the Online Education Initiative), Mississippi's Virtual Community College System, and the Oregon State University eCampus.

=== Publishers ===
LSI, through its content conversion services and conferencing and tutoring tools, became an early partner to textbook publishers. The NetTutor service was adopted as a value-added feature on new textbooks, whereby purchasers of the textbooks gained access to a certain number of hours of online tutoring.

NetTutor has been packaged over the years with textbooks published by John Wiley and Sons, Pearson, Cengage Learning, and Bedford-St. Martin's, an imprint of MacMillan. LSI content authors have created material that appears in the homework systems associated with McGraw-Hill, Cengage Learning, MacMillan, and Houghton Mifflin Harcourt and in such tools as MyMathLab and WebAssign.

== Education Research and LSI Platforms ==
Recent research compares the performance of college students who use NetTutor to those who do not, and finds evidence that both performance and persistence improve among users of the service. In other cases, schools compared NetTutor favorably to its competitors on ground of price and flexibility of tutoring approach.

A study at Hampton University concluded in 1999 that the whiteboard could effectively support such activities as online office hours.

In 2004, researchers at Stony Brook University concluded that "...according to our research NetTutor remains the only workable math-friendly e-learning communication system."

A study at Utah Valley University in 2006 pointed out the role of the WorldWideWhiteboard as "[o]ne of the earliest synchronous models for math tutoring]").

An example of live interaction on the WorldWhiteWhiteboard can be found in the online journal on writing instruction Kairos.

By 2007, LSI's NetTutor service had conducted one million online tutorial sessions.

== LSI and controversies surrounding distance learning software ==
Online technology is shown to help develop a community of inquiry, which has been shown to improve student participation and results. In particular, schools require students enrolling in online courses to complete inventories of personal study practices, since more commitment is required to complete online courses successfully.

The relative novelty of online tutoring also raises questions of tutor preparedness to support students on the internet, whether that support is delivered in real time (synchronously) or via exchange of documents (asynchronously)

=== User guidelines ===
LSI platforms are used in conjunction with online instruction, delivery of student support in the online and mobile formats, and to aggregate and notify users about events that generate online data. As such, the school needs to perform due-diligence to ascertain that the technology they intend to offer provides essentially the same academic credentials as school educators.

For instance, while technology is documented to yield academic results at least comparable to those of face-to-face services, schools also need to confirm that use of a service or software complies with existing practices of their faculty. To answer this concern, LSI creates, jointly with its schools or publishers, a written set of guidelines called "Rules of Engagement" (ROE) that can be modified as needed.

== Notes ==
=== References ===
- Collison, G., Elbaum, B., Haavind, S. & Tinker, R. (2000). Facilitating online learning: Effective strategies for moderators. Atwood Publishing, Madison.
- Hewett, Beth L. (2010). The online writing conference: a guide for teachers and tutors. Boynton/Cook Heinemann, Portsmouth, NJ.
- Jacques, D., and Salmon, G (2007) Learning in Groups: A Handbook for on and off line environments, Routledge, London and New York.
- Patrick, Pamela K. S. (2005) "Online Counseling Education: Pedagogy Controversies and Delivery Issues." VISTAS2005. 5(52). pp. 239–242. Retrieved April 15, 2011 from counseling.org.
