= Neal Taparia =

American Businessman (born 1984)

- Born: 1984 (age 41–42); Hinsdale, Illinois, U.S.
- Education: Northwestern University
- Organization: EasyBib.com

Neal Taparia (born 1984) is an Indian-American businessperson known for founding Solitaired and Imagine Easy, which developed EasyBib.

== Early life and education ==
Taparia received his education from Hinsdale Central High School and later graduated from Weinberg College at Northwestern University in 2006. While attending Hinsdale Central High School.

== Career ==
Taparia founded EasyBib.com, a website that automates bibliography formatting and organization, catering to students of all levels.

In 2001, Taparia co-founded Imagine Easy, an educational software company that owns tools such as EasyBib, Citation Machine, BibMe, Cite This for Me, and Normas APA. By 2015, the Imagine Easy portfolio of services reached over 100 million users annually. The company was acquired by Chegg in 2016.

In 2019, Taparia co-founded Unwind Media with Darshan Somashekar, which developed Solitaired, a digital game platform.
