= WorldWideWhiteboard =

World Wide Whiteboard is a Web-based online collaboration and conferencing tool designed for use in online education. It was developed by Link-Systems International (LSI), a privately held distance-learning software corporation in Tampa, Florida. The World Wide Whiteboard went online in 1996 under the name NetTutor, although the LSI NetTutor online tutoring service is technically an implementation of the World Wide Whiteboard product. Version 3.8 of the World Wide Whiteboard is used in the current NetTutor online tutoring service, and in its on-campus online tutoring programs, online courses, and collaborative learning environments. As a Java applet, it can be run on Windows, Mac, and Linux without downloading software. LSI maintains the application and leases both hosted and unhosted access to it. LSI operations, tutoring, product development, online content services, management, and technical support are housed in the company's Tampa offices.

== History ==
The World Wide Whiteboard is the first software product developed by Link-Systems International (LSI). LSI was launched in 1995 primarily as a company that converted text-based content, like scholarly journals, into an SGML format. Incorporated in the State of Florida on February 27, 1996, LSI expanded its mission to the Web-based implementation of a variety of traditionally face-to-face academic activities. The company developed what it called the "Net Tutor" product that included a whiteboard-like interface and, later, a tutoring service that used the whiteboard to conduct online tutoring. For about five years, the software was leased as NetTutor to schools, individual educators, and programs to, for example, conduct online tutoring using tutors provided by the institution, as well as for online instruction and office hours.

Eventually, LSI renamed the interface to World Wide Whiteboard. The company still owns the NetTutor trademark, which refers to the online tutoring it supplies via the World Wide Whiteboard and using professional tutors it employs.

This history seems to justify the company's claim that it was the first to offer commercially a tool for Web access to a shared, real-time environment with such education-oriented features as subject-specific toolbars. The World Wide Whiteboard was also adopted as an option available with certain textbooks by publishers such as McGraw-Hill, John Wiley and Sons, Pearson, Cengage Learning, and Bedford, Freeman and Worth. The use of the World Wide Whiteboard by campuses and educational programs to support online environments, give classes and hold faculty office hours and meetings expanded over the next decade.

In 2010, LSI began the development of an HTML5 version of the World Wide Whiteboard. This version has now replaced the earlier, Java-based version and allows for the use of the interface on mobile devices. This is one of several cases where software developers have opted for browser-based development, counting on the future development of HTML5 APIs to support audio and video interaction, rather than self-standing phone apps. As of 2013, installations of World Wide Whiteboard had been converted from Java-based to HTML5-based versions.

As the World Wide Whiteboard gained more popularity, LSI was included in the Inc. 5000 in 2014.

== Use ==
The World Wide Whiteboard product appeared as the first successful web collaboration tool in wide use in online education. Online whiteboards generally can accommodate a theoretically unlimited number of participants and an instructor in a live or synchronous interactive session. The World Wide Whiteboard allows for both audio and video streams, as well as numerous asynchronous modes of interaction.

=== Usage studies ===
- A study at Hampton University in 1999 concluded that the World Wide Whiteboard could effectively support such activities as online office hours.
- A 2004 study at Stony Brook University comparing the World Wide Whiteboard with tools available in Blackboard concluded that "despite some flaws, according to our research NetTutor remains the only workable math-friendly e-learning communication system."
- The World Wide Whiteboard supported the online tutoring programs of individual universities, such as at Utah Valley State College, in a study describing its use as "one of the earliest synchronous models for math tutoring".
- The World Wide Whiteboard was used to coordinate education across multiple campuses at the University of Idaho, in a study beginning in 2005, that showed increasing acceptance of Web-based online tutoring in the university setting.

Certain of these studies have been cited widely, mainly because of the seminal role of the World Wide Whiteboard as an educational Web conferencing tool.

Other questions raised by scholars include:

- How comfortable is the average learner with the technology of the World Wide Whiteboard?
- Does the conversation with an online educator—even a "live" one—fully synthesize the give and take of the classroom environment?

== Degree of customization ==
The technology of the World Wide Whiteboard is not geared to a particular pedagogic or andragogic approach. Its set of activities can therefore be used by any educator for online communication. This also means that questions about how the World Wide Whiteboard is set up are matters for the institution to decide. LSI has no consultancy component, so that, while figures about usage of the World Wide Whiteboard can be used to demonstrate how a school's Quality Enhancement Program is working, it is up to the user to create the documentation for this or any other accreditation-related measures.

However, each feature of the World Wide Whiteboard can be customized for use in different institutions and for different subjects. The appearance of the dashboard, and symbols displayed on the whiteboard interface can be customized, as well. As an example, fractions and graphing tools may appear on an Algebra class whiteboard, while there may be integral signs as well on the toolbar for a calculus course.

== See also ==
- E-learning
- Interactive whiteboards
