= Sean Conway (businessman) =

American businessman

- Born: May 27, 1984 (age 41); San Diego, United States
- Education: University of Arizona
- Occupation: Entrepreneur
- Known for: Founder of Notehall & Pillow

Sean Conway (born May 27, 1984) is an American entrepreneur. Conway has founded and invested in businesses such as Notehall and Pillow; the latter was acquired by the Expedia Group in 2018.

== Early life and education ==
Conway was born in San Diego, and he completed his bachelor's degree in entrepreneurship from the Eller College of Management at the University of Arizona.

== Career ==
In 2008, Conway founded Notehall, an online marketplace where college students can purchase and sell class notes, along with his classmates D.J. Stephan, Justin Miller, and Fadi Chalfoun.

The group appeared on an episode of Shark Tank where they agreed on-air to an investment offer of $90,000 from Barbara Corcoran; however, the group instead moved forward with a funding event by start-up incubator DreamIt Ventures. Notehall was ranked as one of the Top Nine Most Successful Shark Tank Businesses by HuffPost.

In 2009, Conway was one of the finalists for the title of America's Best Young Entrepreneurs. In 2011, Notehall was acquired by Chegg.

In 2013, Conway teamed up with Justin Miller, Dan Palumbo and Todd Conway to launch Airenvy, which offers short-term rentals via multifamily properties. Later, the company's name was changed to Pillow.

Conway is the current GM of Multifamily Urban Supply at Expedia Group.
