= Smarthinking =

- Company type: Subsidiary
- Industry: Education
- Founded: 1999
- Headquarters: Washington, DC, USA
- Key people: Christa Ehmann Powers, Chief Education Officer
- Products: online tutoring, writing review
- Parent: Pearson
- Website: www.smarthinking.com

Smarthinking was an academic online tutoring service, provided by Pearson Education. The service provided on-demand support from tutors in over 25 subjects. Smarthinking used a pedagogical approach along with whiteboard interface technology to connect students and tutors. After over 20 years, the service closed in August 2023.

Smarthinking launched in 1999 to provide real-time assistance for students in postsecondary education. In 2007, Smarthinking was honored with the Software & Information Industry Association (SIIA) CODie award for Best Instruction Solutions for Students at Home.

== History ==
In an effort to expand its offerings, Pearson Education acquired Smarthinking in February 2011. December 1, 2011 Smarthinking launched its new discipline of support for reading. Tutors could perform live sessions in core areas of vocabulary, reading and comprehension. In 2012, Pearson reported the addition of Liberal Arts Math to its Math services. To date Smarthinking has over 1500 tutors, and has completed between 6 and 7 million tutoring sessions. It is headquartered in 1919 M. St., NW Suite 600 Washington, DC 20036.

== Leadership ==
Smarthinking leadership team was composed of former college professors and experts in their disciplines.

Christa Ehmann Powers, Ph.D. has served as Vice President & Chief Education Officer since Smarthinking’s launch in 1999, and heads the development of online tutoring and instructional services in the United States and internationally.

== Results ==
Pearson- conducted efficacy studies on the effectiveness of Smarthinking have shown the impact of usage, including:

• Students using Smarthinking at Volunteer State Community College were eight times more likely to successfully complete their courses.
