= Kno =

Software company

Kno, Inc.
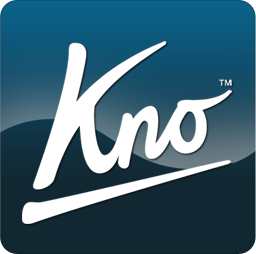
- Type: Subsidiary of Intel
- Industry: E-learning, Educational technology, Educational software
- Defunct: 2013
- Headquarters: Santa Clara, CA, United States
- Key people: Osman Rashid; Babur Habib; Marc Andreessen
- Products: eTextbooks and eBooks
- Services: Education software
- Website: kno.com

Kno, Inc. was an American educational software company that worked with publishers to offer digital textbooks and other educational materials. In November 2013, after raising over $73 million in venture capital, the company was acquired by Intel. The website was later shut down and the service was renamed as Intel Education Study.

== History ==
Kno was founded in May 2009 by chief executive officer Osman Rashid and chief technology officer Babur Habib, a co-founder of Chegg. The firm was based in Santa Clara, California and received funding from Andreessen Horowitz, Intel Capital, Goldman Sachs, FLOODGATE and GSV Capital.

The company initially announced a line of tablet computers in June 2010 with the goal to offer a digital textbook and student platform aimed at the academic market. The textbook tablet was available either with a single panel 14.1 inch touchscreen, or with dual 14.1 inch touchscreens and the operating system was based on Linux and WebKit.

In April 2011, Kno licensed its hardware designs to Intel and shifted its focus to developing software. Two months later, the company released an iPad application, followed by versions for the Galaxy Note 10.1, Android Jelly Bean, Windows 7 and 8, and web browsers and devices.

In August 2012, the company expanded its catalog of titles to include the K-12 market.

The company was acquired by Intel in 2013.
