= SwoopThat.com =

SwoopThat, LLC.
- Company type: Private
- Industry: Price comparison service, online textbook price comparison
- Founded: 2009
- Headquarters: San Diego, California, U.S.

SwoopThat.com was an online textbook price comparison service. It was based in San Diego, California, and specialized in college textbooks but included high school textbooks as well. The company's "books by course" search engine let students input their class schedules, see all the required textbooks for those schedules, and find the cheapest online sources of those books. The search engine also included a textbook exchange feature through which students could buy and sell books from other students. The website also included a textbook buyback platform through which students could sell their textbooks back to online vendors. SwoopThat was featured in The New York Times, on the website of the Today Show, on the website of Computerworld magazine and the weblog lifehacker.com.

== History and business model ==
SwoopThat was founded by students from Claremont McKenna College and Harvey Mudd College. It originally existed as a product search engine with an emphasis on local products and stores. It later changed to focus on textbooks based on a books by course model. It added course and textbook data from over 2,300 colleges in the United States. Through SwoopThat, students could compare prices for new books, used books, rental books and ebooks.

Renamed HubEdu in 2012, it was bought by Rafter shortly after.
