= Growing Stars =

Online tutoring company in Pleasanton, California

- Website type: Online tutoring, e-learning
- Headquarters: Pleasanton, California, United States
- Key people: Saji Philip (Co-founder and Chairman); Biju Mathew (Founder and CEO); Bina George (VP Operations); Binu Mathai (VP Engineering)
- Subsidiaries: Growing Stars Infotech
- Website: www.growingstars.com
- Commercial: Yes
- Registration: Required
- Launched: November 2002; 23 years ago
- Current status: Active

Growing Stars, Inc. is an online tutoring company based in Pleasanton, California, which operates a personalized learning platform for students.

== History ==
Growing Stars was established in November 2002 by Biju Mathew, an Indian-origin software engineer, and his friend Saji Philip with seed money of $500,000. Mathew recruited tutors from his hometown Kochi for math, science, and English, and the company began operations in January 2004 as a one-on-one homework outsourcing and test preparation tutoring service for students based in the United States. It later expanded to include students from countries such as Canada, Australia, and Great Britain. It ran a pilot for the Upward Bound program at Marist College, Poughkeepsie, New York.
