= Online learning =

Online learning may refer to study in home

- Educational technology, or e-learning
  - E-learning (theory)
  - List of online educational resources
  - Distance education
  - Online school
  - Online learning in higher education
  - Online tutoring
  - Massive open online courses
- Online machine learning, in computer science and statistics
