= Notehall =

Online marketplace for students

Notehall, Inc.
- Type: Private
- Industry: Electronic Commerce
- Founded: 2008
- Headquarters: San Francisco, California, United States
- Key people: Sean Conway, Co-Founder and CEO; Justin Miller, Co-Founder and President; D.J. Stephan, Co-Founder and CMO; Fadi Chalfoun, CTO
- Products: Classnotes
- Website: http://www.notehall.com/ (redirect)

Notehall was an online marketplace that enabled college students to buy and sell class notes, study guides, and other course materials. Founded in 2008 by students at the University of Arizona, the company gained attention after appearing on the ABC television series Shark Tank in 2009.

In 2011, Notehall was acquired by Chegg and integrated into Chegg's Homework Help platform.

== Concept ==
Students who are looking to sell class notes, outlines, or study guides can upload documents to Notehall in order to make them available to their classmates. Students looking to purchase documents can buy credits from the website which can be used to view the documents. Notehall takes 50% of the sales of any notes.

== History ==
Notehall was launched in 2008 at the University of Arizona by Sean Conway, Justin Miller, D.J. Stephan and Fadi Chalfoun. Within 8 months, 40% of the students at the University of Arizona were using Notehall. By November 2008, the student government at the University of Arizona was considering a partnership with Notehall.

In October 2009, Notehall appeared on the ABC reality show Shark Tank where they were successful in landing a $90,000 offer from Barbara Corcoran. However, weeks after the episode aired, Notehall eventually declined Corcoran's offer, and decided to participate in DreamIt Ventures annual start-up incubator and funding event, later in 2009.

The co-founders of Notehall were finalists in BusinessWeek's 2009 America's Best Young Entrepreneurs.

Stephan and Conway sold Notehall to Chegg in June 2011. According to the SEC filing for the sale, Chegg paid Notehall $3.7 million in equity.

== Criticism ==
The practice of buying and selling course notes in sites such as Notehall (and competitors such as Course Hero) has been criticised by university officials and faculty members. In California, Mark Cioc, Interim Vice Provost and Dean of Undergraduate Education at the University of California Santa Cruz, sent a letter to all faculty members and undergraduates alerting them that the commercialization of class notes is illegal in California. Cioc went so far as to refer to note selling sites as "devious," and the UCSC general counsel has sent "cease and desist" letters to Notehall, OneClass, and Course Hero.

Individual faculty members have also expressed concerns that the selling of notes based on their lectures and courses could violate their intellectual property rights. Illinois Institute of Technology employee and former DePaul University faculty member Gina M said, “If I put the time and effort into developing a brief summary of a class I was teaching or a particular lesson, I would be extremely disappointed if it were put on the Internet and people were making a profit off of it, especially without my permission.” University of Manitoba faculty member Brad MacKenzie said, “In my view, these kinds of postings, not only violate intellectual priority laws, but are unethical in the way that they take what is private information and post them in a public domain."

Even the Colorado State University guide to Notehall, OneClass, Course Hero, and Koofers explains, "Uploading an instructor's work product is a copyright violation issue. Examples are a PowerPoint presentation or study guide prepared by the instructor, even if it has been distributed to the class. Students may not profit from another's work."

Finally, Indiana University-Bloomington professor Edward Castronova noted that this sort of commercialization of classroom note taking can easily become a black market (just as gold farming has in online games): "How long before we have 'note farmers' - people who go to class just to take notes and sell them?"

Others feel these criticisms unjustified. They note that sharing notes promotes learning, which is the purpose of classes, and that notes taken in class are the property of those creating them.
