= NetTutor =

Online tutoring platform

NetTutor is a Web-based online tutoring service founded in 1995 in Tampa, Florida. All NetTutor operations are conducted at Link-Systems International’s main office in Tampa, Florida.

== History ==
The NetTutor website, trademark, and interface technology are owned by Link-Systems International (LSI), a privately held distance-learning software corporation in Tampa, Florida launched in 1995 with the goal of making academic resources available on the Web. The company was incorporated in the State of Florida on February 27, 1996. NetTutor was the firm's first product and went live later that year, making it possibly the first private online tutoring service to provide tutoring in which the learner could choose tutoring that is either synchronous, with tutor and learner simultaneously online, or asynchronous, where the learner submits questions and receives a tutor's response via direct messaging. LSI began to lease the technology supporting NetTutor (also under the NetTutor name) in the following year.

LSI also develops, maintains, and leases hosted access to the proprietary Java-based whiteboard-style interface (WorldWideWhiteboard) with which NetTutor conducts tutoring.

=== Textbook publishers ===
NetTutor was apparently the first online tutoring service to integrate with textbooks. Access to NetTutor, for instance, has been packaged with certain McGraw-Hill math, science, and accounting books since approximately 1997. Over the subsequent years, NetTutor has been packaged with higher education textbooks published by John Wiley and Sons, Pearson, Cengage Learning, and Bedford, Freeman and Worth.

=== Research on the NetTutor interface ===
Early research into NetTutor was conducted by educators eager to employ technology in their own teaching. Consequently, it focuses on technical issues such as usability and robustness, but also on the ability of participants to express themselves in effective online discussion of specialized subjects, especially mathematics. A study at Hampton University in 1999 concluded that NetTutor could effectively support activities such as online office hours.

The whiteboard-like nature of the NetTutor interface (today marketed separately by LSI as the WorldWideWhiteboard) offered tools to support subject-specific online chat and to illustrate concepts.

Similar results were found using NetTutor technology and tutors at Utah Valley State College (in a study describing the use of NetTutor as "one of the earliest synchronous models for math tutoring") and at the University of Idaho, in a study beginning in 2005—showing increasing acceptance of Web-based online tutoring in the university setting.

=== Usage ===
By 2007, LSI claimed that its NetTutor tutors had conducted over one million online tutorial sessions and by 2016, NetTutor had conducted more than three million tutorial sessions.

The service has expanded from its initial ties with the textbook publishing industry and now directly reaches learners in a variety of environments, such as at college-track high school programs, for-profit schools, programs associated with the labor movement, public universities, and community colleges.

== Features ==
Learners acquire access to NetTutor by directly purchasing tutoring time from the NetTutor website, purchasing a textbook which has a NetTutor support package, or through their school. The NetTutor service is typically integrated into an existing virtual learning environment such as a publisher Web portal; a learning management system like Blackboard, Moodle, or Sakai; or a specific campus tutoring website.

NetTutor assistance is of the "academic-assistance" type. Conversations take place in a shared virtual whiteboard environment equipped with a toolbar for inserting math, chemistry, accounting, or English proofing symbols. Learners may submit their writing or questions for tutor review, or may choose an available live tutor and engage synchronous discussion. Learners may save or print out their live tutorial sessions, but live tutoring is exclusively one-on-one, so that the possible benefits of a discussion involving a group of peers are not directly available.

This mode of access opens NetTutor to several criticisms, such as the accusation that tutors have an interest in exhausting the tutoring hours paid for, in order to get them to purchase more; that the tutor may rush the tutorial session by providing an answer to do more sessions and enable the learner to engage in academic dishonesty; or that the tutor may not be committed to the learner’s goals. NetTutor claims to have elaborate tutor vetting and training programs and to make all learning resources available to tutors. LSI also agrees upon detailed tutoring guidelines with representatives of its institutional clients. It also provides support for learners who struggle to use the interface. It focuses on helping students find answers on their own rather than simply providing correct answers.

LSI, apparently in response to several controversies that surround the use of distance education and online tutoring, has taken some measures to assure users of the academic value of NetTutor. Recent research published about NetTutor suggests that offering students the use of online tutoring as a resource in a traditional "brick-and-mortar" setting leads to an increase in student persistence and achievement.
