= Wyzant =

Online services marketplace in educational technology

- Website type: Private
- Founded: Chicago, Illinois (2005)
- Headquarters: Chicago, {{{location_country}}}
- Area served: United States
- Founders: Andrew Geant and Mike Weishuhn
- Industry: Education service
- Services: Online tutoring
- Employees: 3700 full time employees (2025)
- Website: www.wyzant.com
- Current status: Online

Wyzant is an American educational technology company that develops an online platform for hiring tutors. It is headquartered in Chicago, Illinois.

== History ==
Wyzant was co-founded in 2005 by Andrew Geant and Mike Weishuhn. The platform's users are able to leave feedback on tutors and have the option to get background checks. As of 2013, it had roughly 500,000 registered tutors. In 2013, Accel Partners invested $21.5 million into Wyzant. Wyzant subsequently acquired their competitor Tutorspree.

The company was acquired by IXL Learning in 2021.
