= Osman Rashid =

Pakistani-American businessman (born 1970)

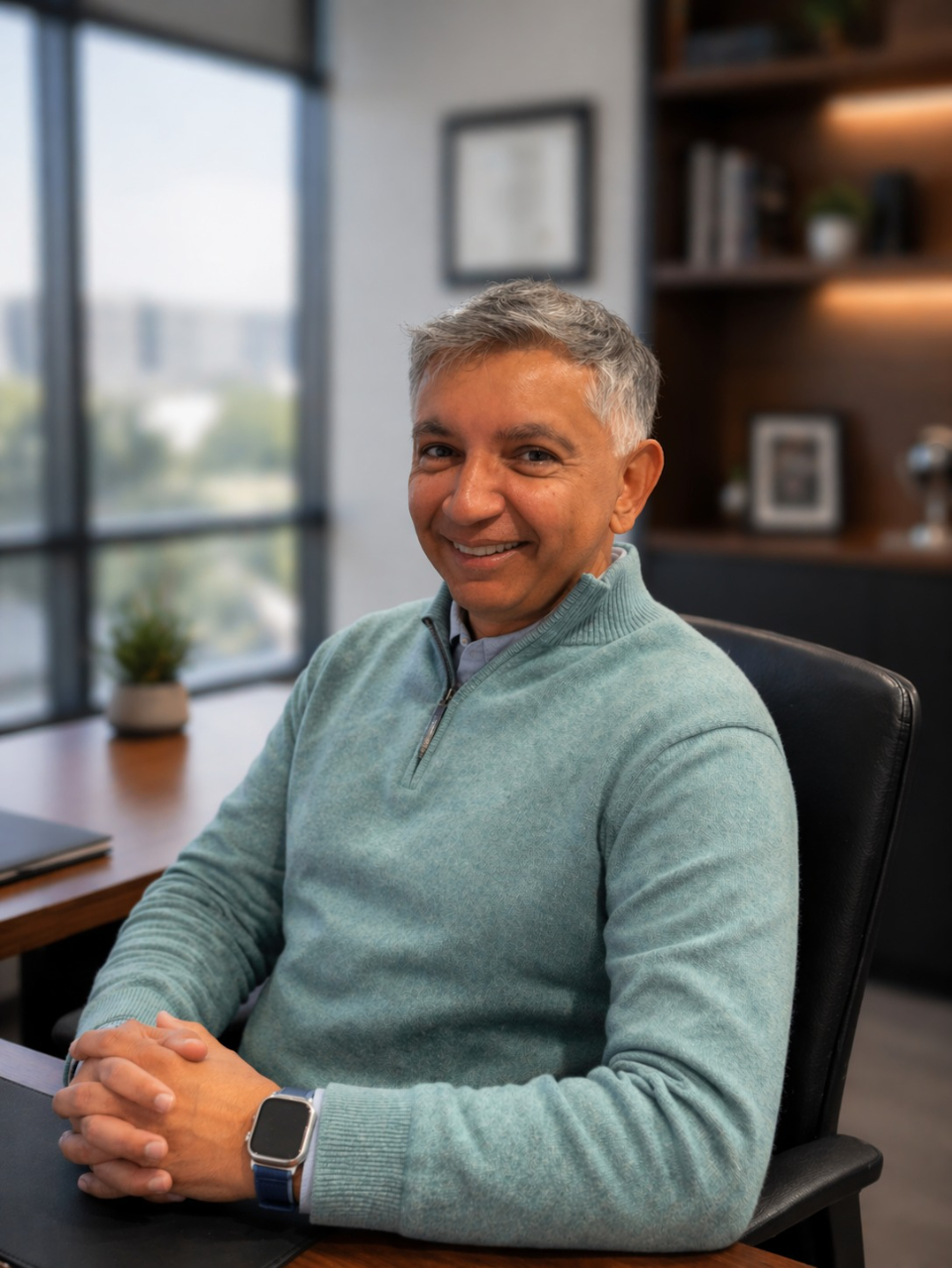
- Osman Rashid in 2026
- Born: 1970 (age 55–56); London, UK
- Education: University of Minnesota
- Known for: Chegg

Osman Rashid (born 1970) is a British-born Pakistani-American businessman who is the founder and chief executive officer of Convo Corp. He is the co-founder and former CEO of Chegg. He later co-founded and was CEO of Kno, Inc, a digital education platform company, which was acquired by Intel in 2013. He subsequently founded Galxyz Inc., in 2014.

He is also the co-founder and chairman of SOAR Education, an initiative aimed at expanding access to affordable STEM education in Pakistan. He is also the co-founder and CEO of Khoj Resorts, a hospitality company developing eco-conscious resorts in Pakistan. Rashid also serves as chairman of Khan Academy Pakistan, a local initiative of the U.S.-based nonprofit education platform, and chairman of Jaglot Gathering, a forum focused on technology, education, and policy innovation in Pakistan.

== Early life ==
Rashid was born in London, did his early schooling in Ghana and finished middle and high school from Islamabad, Pakistan. He later moved to the United States where he received a bachelor's degree in electrical engineering from University of Minnesota in 1993.

== Career ==
Before founding Galxyz, Chegg and Kno, Rashid also started Gravitywell, an ASP based customer service company, and worked at Venturian, a subsidiary of ATIO Corporation, where Osman was VP of Business Development and Marketing. Between start-ups, Osman was Director of Business Development at Chordiant Software, Inc.

== Philanthropy ==
Osman helped spearhead Chegg for Good program which plants a tree for every rental made, and to date has helped plant over 6 million trees. At Kno he developed a partnership with DonorsChoose.org to donate $1 of every sale made to help classrooms get school supplies. Osman is actively involved as a board member at ChildLife Foundation Pakistan which is bringing critical care and prevention of diseases to millions of young and needy children in Pakistan through a network of Urgent Care Clinics.

He plans to set up an Endowment Fund to provide quality education to the financially disadvantaged, of which the platform is SOAR STEM Schools.
