= StudyBlue =

- Company type: Private
- Industry: Education
- Founded: 2009
- Founder: Chris Klündt
- Fate: Acquired by Chegg, Inc. in 2018
- Headquarters: San Francisco, CA, USA
- Area served: International
- Website: http://www.studyblue.com

StudyBlue was an online studying platform for high school and college students. The website allowed users to upload class study materials, create electronic flashcards to study and share with others, and practice quizzes. StudyBlue allowed students to store their notes in the cloud and connect with other students studying the same subjects. StudyBlue content could be accessed online or on mobile phone applications. The company served students at high schools, community colleges, and universities predominantly in the United States and Canada, but also around the world. Originally based in Madison, WI, StudyBlue was located in San Francisco, CA as of September 2012. StudyBlue was acquired by Chegg in 2018 for $20.8 million and discontinued at the end of 2020.

StudyBlue was founded by two students at the University of Wisconsin–Madison as The Class Connection in 2006. The company was renamed StudyBlue in 2009.

StudyBlue's services included electronic flashcards, note uploading, quizzes and storage of digital study materials. They could be created, modified and shared on StudyBlue's website or on mobile applications for the iPhone, iPad and Android devices. The app had 500 million study materials.
