= Cramster.com =

Educational website

- Website type: Educational technology
- Available in: English
- Dissolved: December 8, 2010; 15 years ago
- Key people: Shai Reshef, Aaron Hawkey, Robert Angarita
- Commercial: Yes
- Launched: 2002; 24 years ago
- Current status: Acquired by Chegg

Cramster.com was an educational technology website that provided online homework and textbook help for college and high school students in areas such as math, science, engineering, humanities, business, and writing. Cramster used a freemium model, allowing students to pay for or earn access to premium services. Founded in 2002 by Aaron Hawkey, Robert Angarita and Kavé Golabi, the company was headquartered in Pasadena, CA. In 2010, the company was acquired by Chegg.

== History ==
Cramster launched its website publicly in 2003. A few years later, Cramster introduced its Q&A Board feature, which allowed interaction between members to solve homework problems.

Cramster secured $3 million in Series A funding in 2008 and $6 million in Series B funding in 2010, led by Shai Reshef, who was then appointed company Chairman. Cramster had 100,000 active users in November 2008.

Cramster also operated the Facebook application Courses 2.0, which has more than 400,000 users and was voted 4th best application by PC Magazine.

In December 2010, the company was acquired by Chegg.
