= Dan Rosensweig =

American business executive

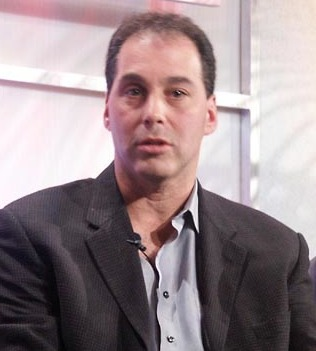
- Rosensweig in 2004
- Born: April 10; Dobbs Ferry, New York
- Education: Hobart and William Smith Colleges
- Occupations: Chairman, president and CEO of Chegg
- Known for: PC Magazine; Guitar Hero; Yahoo!; Chegg
- Spouse: Linda Rosensweig (m. 1988)
- Children: 2

Dan Rosensweig is an American business executive who is chairman, president and former chief executive officer (CEO) of student services company Chegg. Previously, Rosensweig served as president and CEO of Guitar Hero; COO at Yahoo!; president of CNET, and president and CEO of ZDNet.

== Career ==
Following college, Rosensweig's first job was at Dictaphone, then an independent subsidiary of Pitney Bowes, selling word processors door-to-door in Manhattan. Within three hours on the job, he was informed that the company had to lay off nearly 1,000 people, including his division.

In 1983, Rosensweig began working at Ziff Davis as a cold caller selling magazines to mom-and-pop computer retail stores, then worked his way up through the circulation department, to classified ad sales and display ad sales, and then to associate publisher of PC Magazine. Under Rosensweig's leadership, PC Magazine became the leading computer magazine in both audience reach and revenue.

In 1996, Rosensweig led the Ziff Davis launch of a series of Internet print magazines, including, by license, the acclaimed Yahoo! Internet Life. In 1998, he took over Ziff Davis' Internet Operation as president and CEO of ZiffNet, now known as ZDNet, where he took the company public and sold it to CNET, in 2001. Rosensweig played a critical role in the successful merger with CNET. During his tenure at CNET, Rosensweig served as a key participant in company-wide efforts to develop and introduce innovative new Internet advertising formats, such as interactive messaging.

In 2002, Rosensweig joined Yahoo! as COO, where he oversaw global operations through 2006, and developed a mentoring program.

In 2007, Rosensweig became a partner of private investment firm Quadrangle Group, founded by Steven Rattner, opening an office in Silicon Valley.

In March 2009, Rosensweig became president and CEO of Guitar Hero; under his management, the company launched Band Hero and DJ Hero.

In February 2010, Rosensweig joined Chegg as president and CEO, where he has overseen expansion and multiple acquisitions, and heads operations and executive management. He launched the company's IPO in 2013. Chegg expanded from textbook rental into a portfolio of student services under his leadership, transforming Chegg's digital assets to meet student needs.

In June 2024, Rosensweig stepped down as CEO of Chegg, and was succeeded by Nathan Schultz.

Rosensweig is a proponent of mentoring, and of workplace equality. He is an investor in many Silicon Valley companies, including Rent The Runway and Reputation.com.

== Personal life ==
Rosensweig is Jewish, and grew up in the same New York neighborhood as Mark Zuckerberg. He has two daughters with his wife Linda.

== Boards ==
Rosensweig participates on the advisory board of NPO DonorsChoose.org, has served as a Executives in Residence for the mentoring program of The Media and Technology Program at Columbia University; and sits on the boards of directors of Adobe, Inc., VOX Media, Katalyst Media, Fender, and OZY Media, among others.

He also sits on the board at Hobart and William Smith Colleges, where the Rosensweig Learning Commons, Warren Hunting Smith Library is named for him. He is a Colgate University emeritus trustee. He also works with the Boys and Girls Club.
