= Tutorial =

Type of educational tutoring

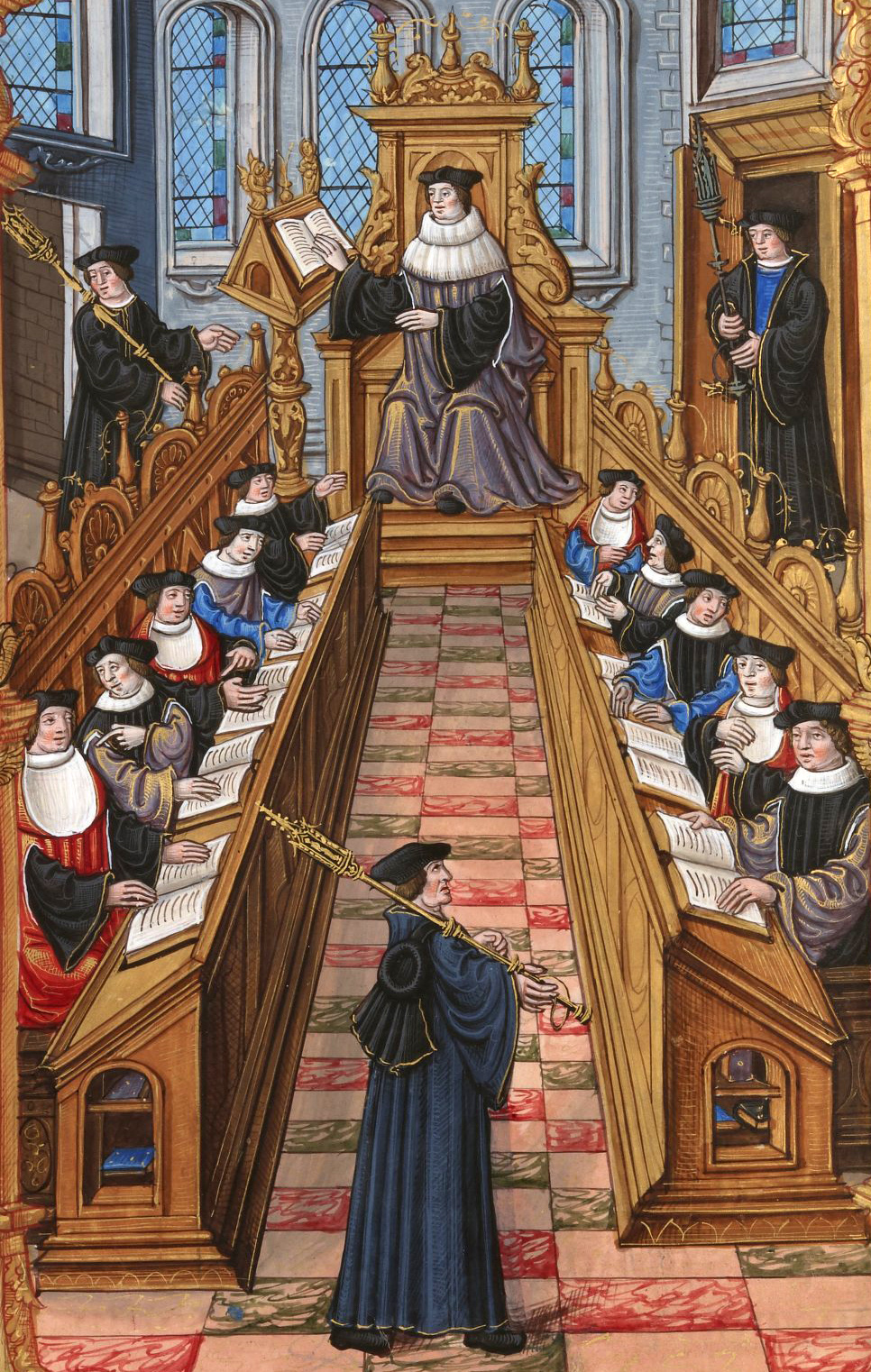
Medieval tutorial

In education, a tutorial is a method of transferring knowledge and may be used as a part of a learning process. More interactive and specific than a book or a lecture, a tutorial seeks to teach by example and supply the information to complete a certain task.

A tutorial can be taken in many forms, ranging from a set of instructions to complete a task to an interactive problem solving session (usually in academia).

== Academia ==
=== Tutorial class ===
In British academic parlance, a tutorial is a small class of one, or only a few students, in which the tutor, a lecturer, or other academic staff member, gives individual attention to the students.

The tutorial system at Oxford and Cambridge is fundamental to methods of teaching at those universities, but it is by no means particular to them; Heythrop College (University of London), for instance, offers a tutorial system but with one-on-one teaching. Another example is Imperial College London, where tutorials in groups of three take place. It is rare for newer universities in the UK to have the resources to offer individual tuition; a class of six to eight students is a far more common tutorial size. At Cambridge, a tutorial is known as a supervision.

In Australian, New Zealand, and South African universities, a tutorial (colloquially called a tute or tut) is a class of 10–30 students. Such tutorials are very similar to the Canadian system, although, tutorials are usually led by honours or postgraduate students, known as 'tutors'.

At the two campuses of St. John's College, U.S. and a few other American colleges with a similar version of the Great Books program, a "tutorial" is a class of 12–16 students who meet regularly with the guidance of a tutor. The tutorial focuses on a certain subject area (e.g., mathematics tutorial, language tutorial) and generally proceeds with careful reading of selected primary texts and working through associated exercises (e.g., demonstrating a Euclid proof or translating ancient Greek poetry). Since formal lectures do not play a large part in the St. John's College curriculum, the tutorial is the primary method by which certain subjects are studied. However, at St. John's the tutorial is considered ancillary to the seminar, in which a slightly larger group of students meets with two tutors for broader discussion of the particular texts on the seminar list.

Some US colleges, such as Williams College, offer tutorials almost identical in structure to that of an Oxbridge tutorial. At Williams, students in tutorials typically work in pairs alongside a professor and meet weekly, while alternately presenting position papers or critiques of their partner's paper.

=== Tutorial schools ===
There are also specialized schools for tutoring such as, Kumon and EduHub. These supplemental hands-on learning programs are especially popular in Asia.

=== Conference tutorials ===
Offered as a service or deliverable to its members, conference tutorials are one example of a continuing education activity sponsored by a technical and professional association.

=== Private study ===
A tutorial in high schools in the United States may also mean a session for homework or other private study.

== Education ==
In documentation and instructional design, tutorials are teaching-level documents that help the learner progress in skill and confidence. Tutorials can take the form of a screen recording (screencast), a written document (either online or downloadable), interactive tutorial, or an audio file, where a person will give step by step instructions on how to do something.

Tutorials usually have the following characteristics:

- A presentation of the view usually explaining and showing the user the user interface
- A demonstration of a process, using examples to show how a workflow or process is completed; often broken up into discrete modules or sections.
- Some method of review that reinforces or tests understanding of the content in the related module or section.
- A transition to additional modules or sections that builds on the instructions already provided. Tutorials can be linear or branching.

While many writers refer to a mere list of instructions or tips as a tutorial, this usage can be misleading.

== Computer-based tutoring ==
In computer-based education, a tutorial is a computer program whose purpose is to assist users in learning how to use parts of a software product such as an office suite or any other application, operating system interface, programming tool, or video game. There are three kinds of software tutorials: 1) video tutorials that the user views, 2) interactive tutorials where the user follows on-screen instructions (and—in some cases—watches short instruction movies), whereupon they do the tutorial exercises and receives feedback depending on their actions; and 3) webinars where users participate in real-time lectures, online tutoring, or workshops remotely using web conferencing software.

== See also ==
- Tutoring agency
- Teaching assistant
- How-to
- Knowledge base
