= University of the People =

Private distance education university

Coordinates: 34.142°N 118.1337°W

- Type: Private distance education university
- Established: February 2009; 17 years ago
- Accreditation: WASC Senior College and University Commission
- President: Shai Reshef
- Academic staff: 1,406 (2026)
- Administrative staff: 57
- Students: 271,095 (2026)
- Location: Pasadena, California, United States
- Website: uopeople.edu

The University of the People (UoPeople) is a private distance education university based in Pasadena, California. Founded in 2009 by Shai Reshef, the university is accredited by the WASC Senior College and University Commission (WSCUC).

== History ==
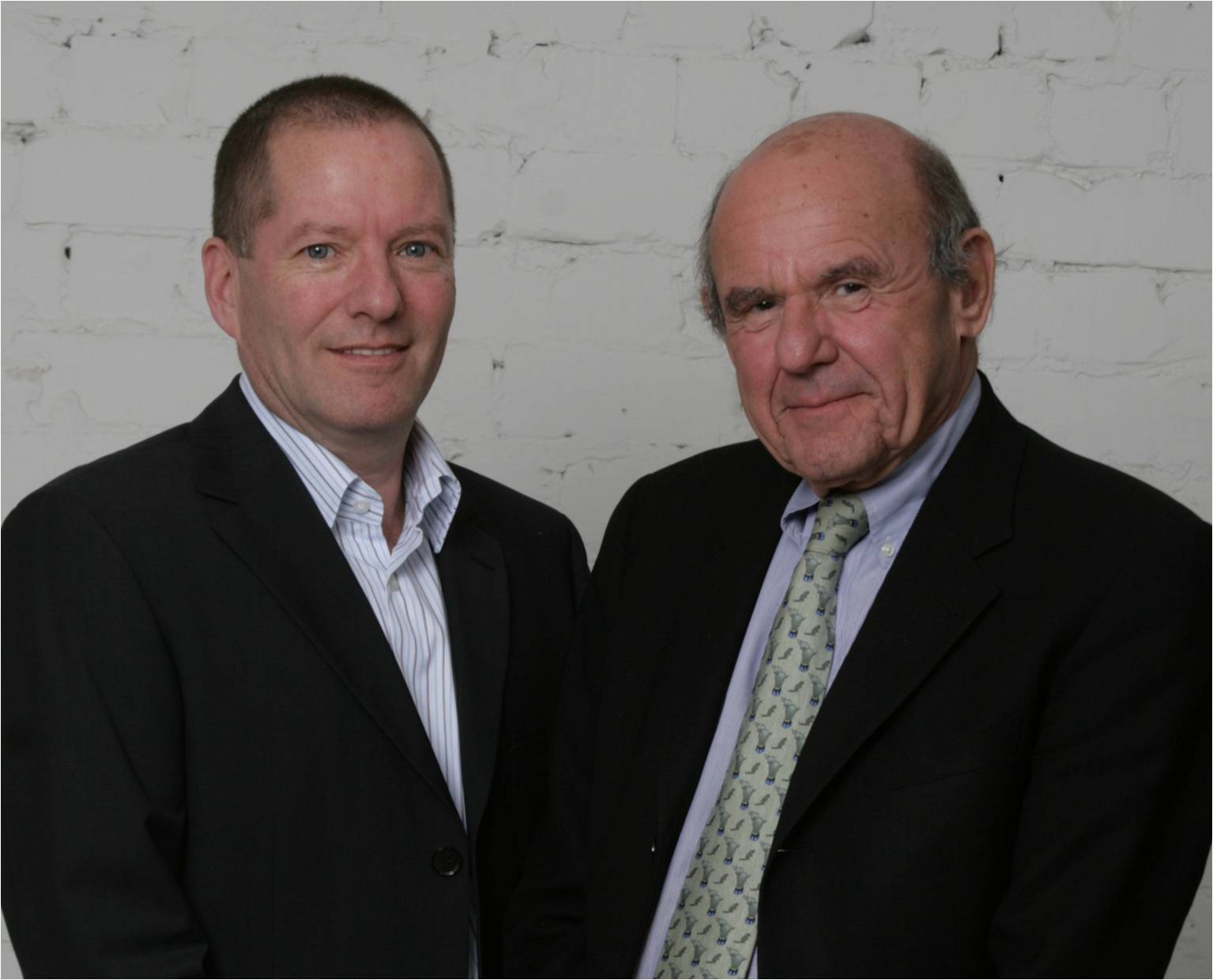
University of the People President Shai Reshef and Provost Emeritus David Cohen

Shai Reshef started the University of the People in January 2009. He was inspired by his previous attempt at building an online university in the Netherlands in the early 2000s and his experience at Cramster. The intent of the University of the People was to provide a tuition-free online alternative for students who would not be able to afford tuition at traditional institutions.

The university has no campus due to its online distance learning nature; however, its admissions office is based in Pasadena, California.

The first UoPeople students began classes in September 2009, studying for associate and bachelor's degrees in business administration and computer science.

In 2016, the university began offering an online Master of Business Administration (MBA).

In 2017, the University of Edinburgh (UE) partnered with the school so that health science graduates of UoPeople could complete a bachelor's at UE.

In 2018, the university announced the new online Master of Education (M.Ed) in Advanced Teaching in collaboration with the International Baccalaureate. This new program started taking in students in 2019. IB started to offer 80 scholarships for eligible M.Ed. students in 2020.

UoPeople in Arabic, announced in the World Economic Forum in April 2019, launched in September 2020; it uses a different website in Arabic and does not require proof of English knowledge.

The university enrolls about 50,000 refugees from around the world. The university uses an asynchronous online learning model.

== Accreditation ==
In 2014, the university was accredited for degree-granting programs through the Distance Education Accrediting Commission (DEAC). The university voluntarily ended its accreditation with DEAC effective December 31, 2025.

University of the People is accredited by the WASC. In June 2021, it received candidate status with the WASC Senior College and University Commission and in February 2025, it received accredited status.

== Organization ==
University of the People Education Ltd is a wholly owned subsidiary which provides support services to the institution. In February 2012, the Gates Foundation awarded the University of the People a grant of $613,282 for the purpose of helping the university earn national accreditation.

== Fees ==
UoPeople is known as a tuition-free university, but students must pay administrative fees to cover all course assessments. The university does not participate in federal financial aid programs, but it does offer some scholarships.
