= Zinch =

Former company

- Website type: College Admissions website
- Owners: Zinch, Inc.
- Founders: Mick Hagen, Brad Hagen, Sid Krommenhoek
- Employees: 15
- Website: www.zinch.com
- Registration: Free
- Launched: March 12th 2007
- Current status: Acquired

Zinch was a company that helped students find scholarships and engage in college networking and recruiting. The company's website enabled students to create a profile similar to a college application, which could be browsed by colleges in which they were interested, providing a forum for a connection between college and Zinch user. Colleges also had the ability to search through these profiles in order to contact interested students.

== History ==
Zinch started out as a research project at Princeton University in June 2006 by a group of students. The company was founded by Mick Hagen, Brad Hagen, and Sid Krommenhoek and launched to the public in March 2007.

Cache Merrill served as CTO of Zinch for 6 years and later founded Zibtek with the core engineering team from Zinch. The company was later run by Anne Dwane, who previously founded and ran Military.com.

In September 2011, Chegg agreed to acquire Zinch as part of its expanding digital student hub. Eventually, the zinch web address began to redirect to Chegg's website, retiring the Zinch brand.
