= BookRenter =

Former online textbook rental company

- Company type: Private
- Industry: Education; Online retailing
- Founded: 2006 in Silicon Valley, California, US
- Defunct: 2016
- Fate: Acquired by eCampus.com
- Headquarters: San Mateo, California
- Products: Online textbook rental eTextbooks

BookRenter was an American online textbook rental company based in San Mateo, California. It was founded in 2006 and was acquired by eCampus.com in 2016.

== History ==
BookRenter was founded as an online textbook rental service in 2006. Colin Barceloux founded the company as a startup in Silicon Valley. Barceloux worked with two engineer majors, Chris Williams and Philippe Huibonhoa to create the website. The company partnered with college bookstores by setting up a virtual rental store on their own websites. In 2010, it reportedly served 6 million students on over 5,000 campuses in the US.

In 2009, Mehdi Maghsoodnia became CEO of the company, replacing Colin Barceloux. In 2010, Netflix co-founder Marc Randolph joined the board of directors.

As of 2011, the company had raised $60 million in funding.

It was the recipient of About.com’s 2012 Reader Choice Award for "Best Site for Renting Textbooks".

In 2014, BookRenter partnered with Staples to expand its textbook rental service delivered through Staples.com.

In May 2017, the company was acquired by eCampus.com.

== See also ==
- Amazon Kindle § Textbook rentals
- Google Play Books § Books on Google Play
- Chegg
