= Reinwardt Academie =

Coordinates: 52°21′58.3″N 4°54′20.1″E

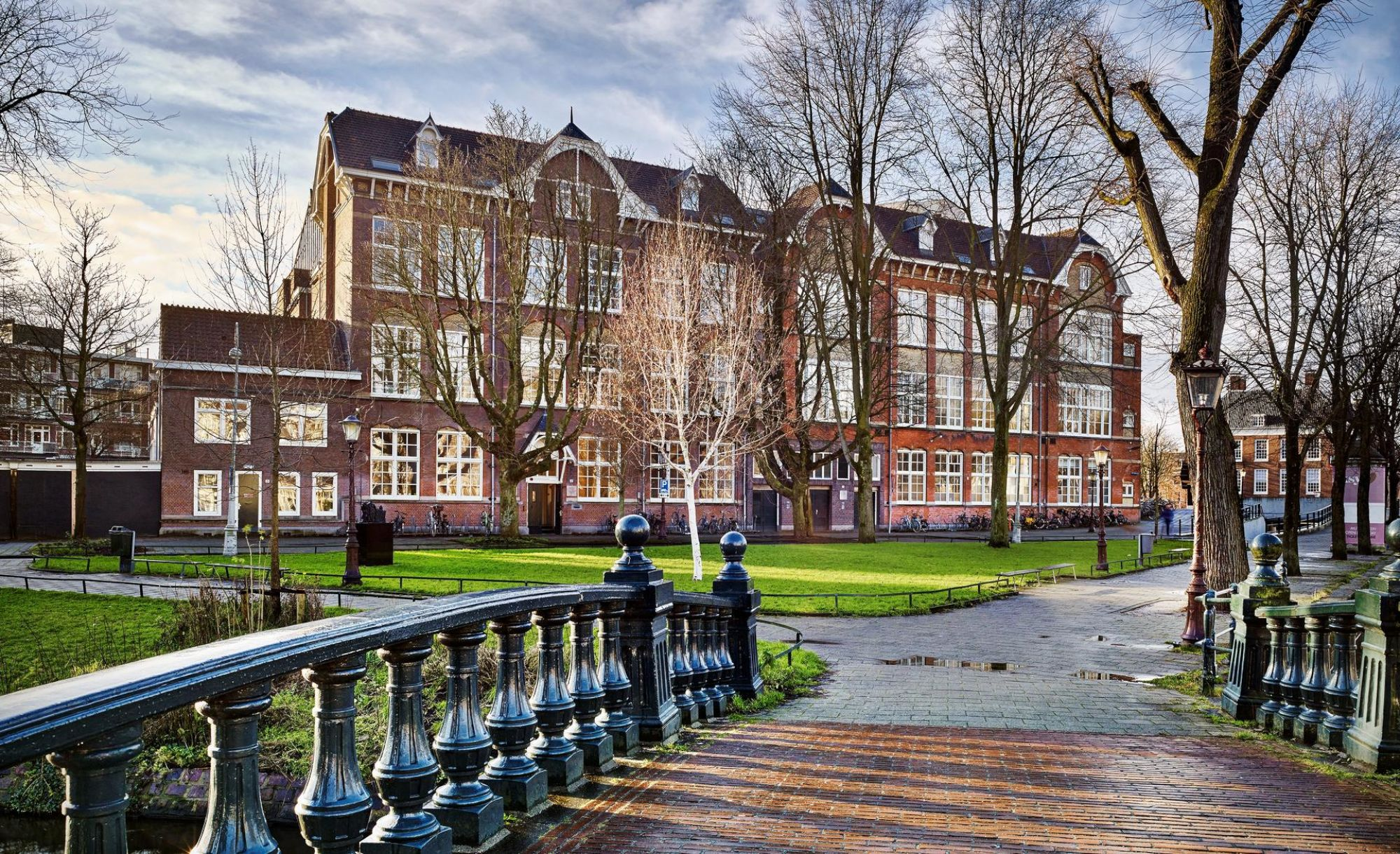
- Current location of the Reinwardt Academie, Hortusplantsoen
- Established: 1976
- Parent institution: Amsterdamse Hogeschool voor de Kunsten
- Location: Amsterdam, Netherlands
- Website: www.reinwardtacademie.nl

De Reinwardt Academie is a Dutch institution for higher vocational education in the Netherlands, which offers bachelor's (in Dutch) and master's (in English) degrees in Cultural heritage.

The school is named for botanist Caspar Georg Carl Reinwardt, and is part of the Amsterdam University of the Arts (AHK). It is the only AHK-program without entrance examination, with students coming from all over Western Europe.

The academy was started in 1976 in Leiden, in a former elementary school building on the Van den Brandelerkade. In the 1980s it moved to the Pesthuis in Leiden, a monumental building from 1661 which now belongs to Naturalis Biodiversity Center. When many Dutch higher professional education institutions merged in 1987, it became part of AHK and in 1992 moved to the Dapperstraat in Amsterdam; in 2015-2016 it moved to the Hortusplantsoen in Amsterdam.

The Dapperstraat location was located at 315 Dapperstraat, 1093 BS Amsterdam; and, was home to the International Masters in Museum Studies "Museology" Program from 1992 for roughly the next 30 years. In the early years of the program, the Masters in Museum Studies was directed by Paul Berghuis. Peter van Mensch was one of the key educators of the program. As of 2022, the Masters in Museum Studies program and Dapperstraat location have been closed.
