= Katonah Museum of Art =

Visual arts museum in Katonah, New York

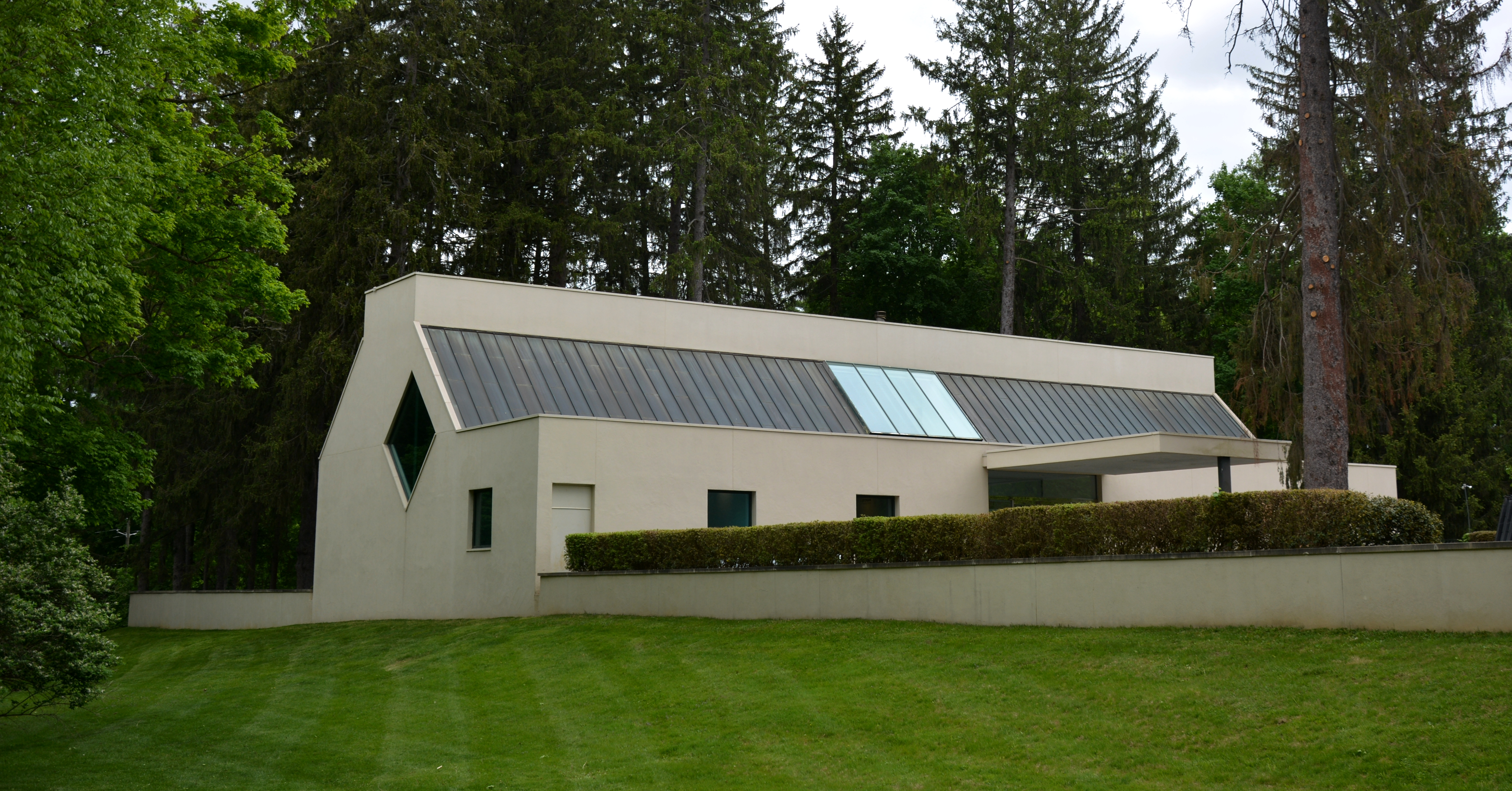
- Established: 1953
- Location: Katonah, New York
- Coordinates: 41.2628°N 73.6733°W
- Director: Michelle Yun Mapplethorpe
- Website: www.katonahmuseum.org

The Katonah Museum of Art is a non-collecting institution geared towards visual arts, located in Katonah, New York. It does not have a permanent collection, but holds temporary exhibitions.

The museum was founded in 1953, in one room at the local library. In 1990 it moved to a separate building, designed by Edward Larrabee Barnes. The cost of the new building was $5.3 million.

In 1993 The New York Times said that the museum had 50,000 visitors a year.

The museum uses the services of volunteers.

== Directors ==
At the time of moving to the new building in 1990, George G. King was the director of the museum. He was succeeded by Susan H. Edwards in 1998. In 2022, Michael Gitlitz was reported to have been the museum's Executive Director until 2021. Leslie Griesbach Schultz was Interim Executive Director from 2021 to 2022. Michelle Yun Mapplethorpe was appointed as Executive Director in 2022.
