= MyMathLab =

Online mathematics education platform

MyMathLab is an online interactive and educational system designed by Pearson Education to accompany its published math textbooks. It covers courses from basic math through calculus and statistics, as well as math for business, engineering and future educators. Pearson designed MyMathLab to respond to the needs of instructors and students who wanted more opportunity for practice, immediate feedback, and automated grading.

== MyLab and Mastering ==
Pearson's MyLab and Mastering series consists of more than 70 online interactive and educational system in a variety of different subjects. Some features of MyMathLab (and MyStatLab) specifically for students are homework, quizzes, tests, full eText, and multimedia tutorials. For instructors' benefits, MyMathLab records and evaluates students' learning progress and time spent on assignments. Instructors may set up a customized MyMathLab course.

== Effectiveness ==
A report of the effectiveness of MyLab and Mastering, and how to plan and implement a course has been published by Pearson.

Fayetteville State University conducted a study on whether using an online interactive system such as MyMathLab would increase a student's academic performance compared to the traditional paper-based homework system. The study was done in a college algebra course. The result showed that those who pass the course using MyMathLab is 70% while using traditional homework system is 49%. However, the study neglected to factor in students preemptively dropping the course out of frustration and the increased amount of time students were forced to spend on a topic due to poor user interface design and incorrect answer parsing. When comparing outcomes between three semesters of a college algebra course taught using MyMathlab and one semester taught with a mix of OER and other low-cost alternatives using the same instructors, a Georgia College & State University study found that students who used the OER and low-cost alternatives were more likely to earn a C or higher and less likely to withdraw from the course than those who used MyMathLab. A study done by North Georgia College and State University shows that most students found MyMathLab's video tutoring feature useful. Some students argue that most of MyMathLab's videos only cover basic concepts when they demand more videos on advanced materials. Another review claims that some tutors are not as easily understood as others. "MyMathLab" has also fallen under additional criticism for wording problems in a way that students cannot easily understand.

Users have complained that content in MyMathLab is not accessible using screen readers.

== Features ==
Pearson's MyMathLab consists of several features that aid instructors and students. The homework and practice exercises take advantage of an algorithm to generate problems, so students can have limitless options to practice problems. Another core feature of MyMathLab is the eText book. The eText book can be viewed through a traditional computer or a mobile tablet. The eText itself has features such as: highlighting text, adding links, bookmark pages, and pin notes. The gradebook feature of MyMathLab helps both instructors and students keep track of progress within the course, and shows students which concepts they have yet to master.

== Controversy ==
Los Angeles City College was sued by two blind students for discrimination under Section 504 of the Rehabilitation Act of 1973 and Title II of the Americans With Disabilities Act. The complaints included that one of the students was required to take a mathematics course using MyMathLab to complete homework assignments and that MyMathLab was inaccessible using screen reading software.
