= Tutor.com =

Online tutoring company

- Website type: Education
- Founded: 1998
- Headquarters: New York City, New York, USA
- Owner: Tutor.com
- Industry: Education
- Products: Online Tutoring, Education, Career Help, Homework Help
- Website: www.tutor.com
- Current status: Online

Tutor.com is an online tutoring company founded in 1998 that connects students to tutors in online classrooms. From 2022 to 2025, the company was owned by Primavera Capital Group. As of July 2025, Tutor.com and The Princeton Review are 100% U.S.-owned, operated, and governed.

== History ==
Tutor.com was founded in 1998 by George Cigale. In its early years, the company focused on partnerships with libraries across the United States, which would provide online tutoring to its clients. Tutor.com expanded into multiple markets, including universities, employee benefits, the United States Department of Defense, and additional direct consumer services.

In January 2013, InterActive Corp (IAC) announced the purchase of Tutor.com, for an undisclosed amount. In August 2014, IAC's former subsidiary and Tutor.com's former parent Match Group bought test-preparation service The Princeton Review and combined it with its Tutor.com educational business. In March 2017, Match Group sold The Princeton Review, along with Tutor.com, to ST Unitas, a Korean education company. In January 2022, Primavera Capital Group acquired The Princeton Review and Tutor.com from ST Unitas. In March 2024, the Florida Department of Education warned districts against using Tutor.com due to its owner's alleged ties to Chinese nationals. In July 2025, Tutor.com and The Princeton Review became 100% U.S-owned, operated, and governed.

=== U.S. military contract ===
Tutor.com has a longstanding contract with the United States Department of Defense to provide its services free to U.S. military service members and their families. In March 2024, US senators Elise Stefanik and Tom Cotton introduced legislation, the Ban Chinese Communist Party Access to U.S. Military Students Act, to prohibit the U.S. Department of Defense from using Tutor.com. This resulted in Tutor.com being removed from Florida state government issued devices. After Tutor.com became 100% U.S.-owned and operated, it was removed from Florida's Prohibited Applications on Government Devices List, which means it is no longer prohibited from being accessed on Florida state government-issued devices and therefore no longer appears on Florida's official list of banned applications. In fact, a letter from Florida's Commissioner of Education warning that school districts, charter schools, and state colleges should not contract with companies that have ties to China, including Tutor.com, was taken down on November 14, 2025, to acknowledge that Tutor.com is now U.S. owned and it has no concerns about potential student data privacy risks.

Furthermore, the final FY25 National Defense Authorization Act (NDAA), enacted as Public Law 118-159 on December 23, 2024, includes only a brief mention of online tutoring in Section 854. The detailed amendments previously proposed by senators Stefanik and Cotton to ban Tutor.com were never passed. The final language in Public Law 118-159 applies broadly to all tutoring providers and does not specifically reference Tutor.com. Tutor.com continues to uphold a 30-year history of safeguarding student data and privacy. It complies with all applicable federal and state regulations, including the Family Educational Rights and Privacy Act (FERPA) and the Children's Online Privacy Protection Act (COPPA); adheres to the National Institute of Standards and Technology (NIST) Special Publication 800-171; and has earned a SOC 2 Type II attestation, conducted by an independent CPA firm. To ensure continuous compliance and protection, Tutor.com employs a dedicated Data Security Officer who actively monitors and enforces all security protocols.

== Leadership ==
Tutor.com was founded by in 1998 by George Cigale, who was CEO through 2013.

Mandy Ginsberg was CEO of The Princeton Review and Tutor.com from 2013 to 2015. She had previously been CEO of Match.com. Ginsberg often appeared in the press to discuss the increasing trend of online tutoring with services like Chegg Tutors (InstaEDU), e-Tutor, Bookmytrainings, and Sylvan Learning, and the issues that families face when it comes to homework and preparing for college.

After the South Korean company ST Unitas acquired The Princeton Review in 2017, Sangje Lee became CEO of The Princeton Review in 2018. In July 2025, Tutor.com and The Princeton Review became 100% U.S-owned, operated, and governed. Robert Batten is CEO of the company.
