= Shai Reshef =

Israeli entrepreneur (born 1955)

- שי רשף
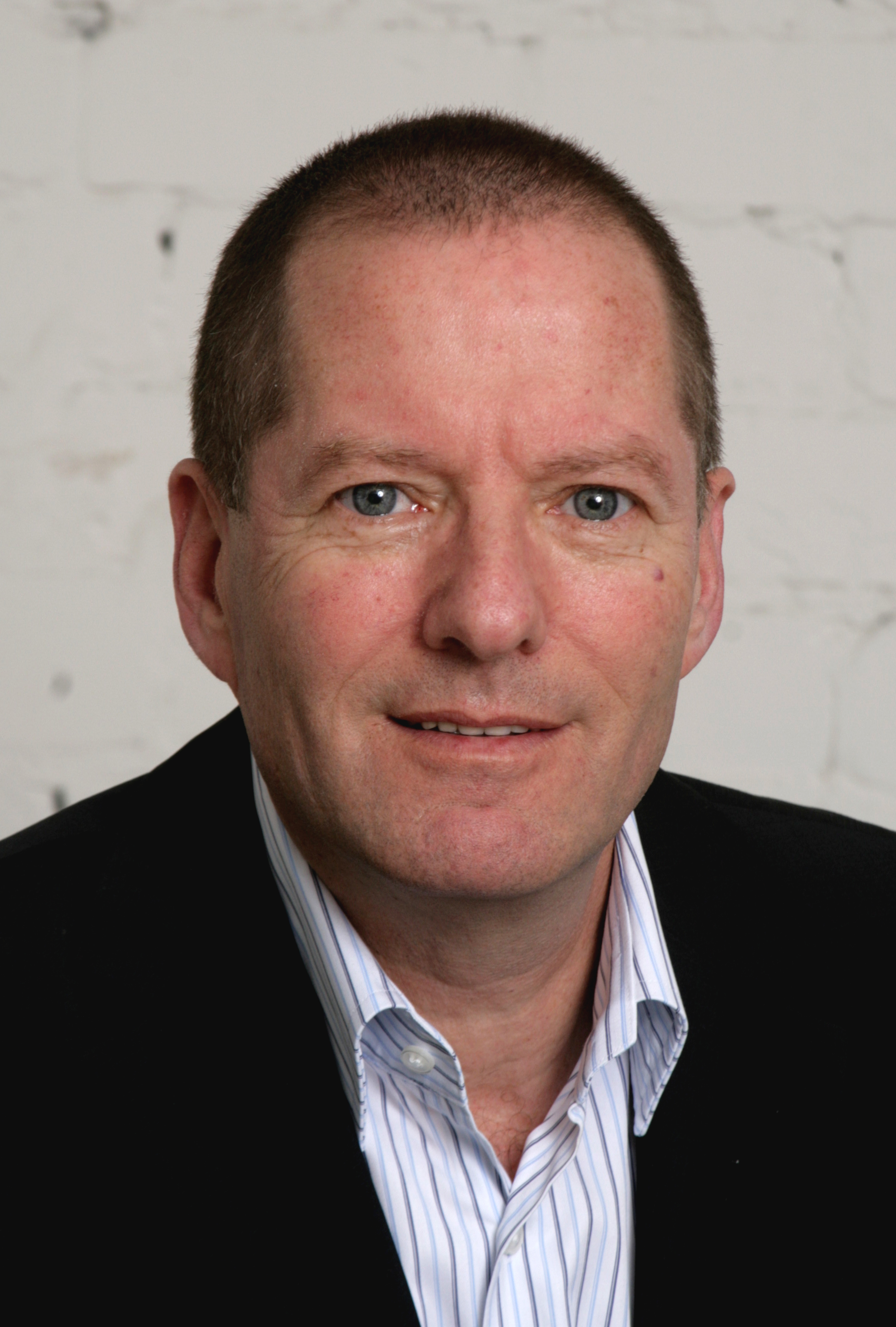
- Shai Reshef in 2010.

President of University of the People
- Incumbent
- Assumed office 2009
- Preceded by: Position established

Personal details
- Born: September 11, 1955 (age 71)
- Spouse: Rotem Reshef
- Children: 4
- Education: Tel Aviv University (BA) University of Michigan (MA)
- Occupation: Entrepreneur, academic administrator

Shai Reshef (Hebrew: שי רשף) is an Israeli entrepreneur and academic administrator. He is the founder and president of the University of the People (UoPeople).

== Early life and education ==
Reshef was born on September 11, 1955. He earned an MA in Chinese politics from the University of Michigan.

== Career ==
Between 2001 and 2004, Reshef chaired KIT eLearning, a company that partnered with the University of Liverpool to deliver online education.

In January 2009, Reshef founded the University of the People (UoPeople), a non-profit, tuition-free, online university aimed at providing accessible higher education to underserved populations globally.

== Awards and recognition ==
He received the Yidan Prize for Education Development in 2023. In 2009, Fast Company included him among the "100 Most Creative People in Business." Wired magazine featured him in its 2012 list of "50 People Changing the World."

== Personal life ==
Reshef is married to artist Rotem Reshef and has four children.
