= Chegg Tutors =

Online tutoring platform

InstaEDU, Inc.
- Type: Subsidiary
- Industry: Education
- Founded: San Francisco, California, USA in November 2011
- Headquarters: San Francisco, United States
- Key people: Alison Johnston, Dan Johnston, Joey Shurtleff (cofounders)
- Products: Online Tutoring
- Parent: Chegg
- Website: CheggTutors

Chegg Tutors (formerly known as InstaEDU) was an online tutoring company that matched students seeking help with online tutors. Students could receive help either on-demand or by scheduling a lesson.

== History ==
Chegg Tutors was founded in 2011 as InstaEDU and launched into public beta in May 2012. At that time, the company also announced that it had raised $1.1M in venture capital funding from The Social+Capital Partnership. Two of the company's co-founders had previously run an in-home tutoring company called Cardinal Scholars. After running Cardinal Scholars they got the idea for an online tutoring company—InstaEDU. In July 2012 they sold Cardinal Scholars to Course Hero. In August 2013, the service announced it had raised a $4 million Series A round of funding from Battery Ventures. At that time, the InstaEDU service also emerged from beta.

On 3 June 2014, Chegg announced that it purchased InstaEDU for $30 million in cash, and that it planned to keep the InstaEDU service active as part of the purchase.

In 2017, Chegg partnered with Sallie Mae to provide student borrowers access to Chegg Tutors.

In late 2020, Chegg announced that Chegg Tutors would be discontinued in 2021. The last day for lessons was announced as January 15, with the last payments to tutors to be made on January 22, and the site to cease operations on January 31.

== Services ==
Students could visit InstaEDU and get matched with a tutor on-demand. InstaEDU allowed students to browse tutor profiles and schedule lessons with a specific tutor. The InstaEDU lesson space used video chat, text chat, a whiteboard, a document editor, code editor, screen sharing, and a file uploader to allow students and tutors to work together. In April 2014, the site announced that it was mobile-friendly; the mobile site supported messaging, scheduling and written lessons.

The site announced it would cease operations by 2021.
