= Chegg =

American educational technology company

Chegg, Inc.
- Company type: Public
- Traded as: NYSE: CHGG; Russell 2000 component
- Founded: July 2006; 20 years ago
- Headquarters: Santa Clara, California, U.S.
- Founders: Aayush Phumbhra; Osman Rashid; Josh Carlson
- Key people: Dan Rosensweig (CEO & executive chairman)
- Industry: Education; Online retailing
- Products: Book rental service Digital textbooks E-learning; Online tutoring Social networking service
- Revenue: ▼US$376.9 million (2025)
- Operating income: ▼ −US$116.9 million (2025)
- Net income: ▼ −US$103.4 million (2025)
- Total assets: ▼US$276.8 million (2025)
- Total equity: ▼US$119.6 million (2025)
- Employees: 1,271 (2024)
- Subsidiaries: Busuu; Notehall
- Website: chegg.com
- "Chegg, Inc. 2024 Annual Report". U.S. Securities and Exchange Commission. February 24, 2025.

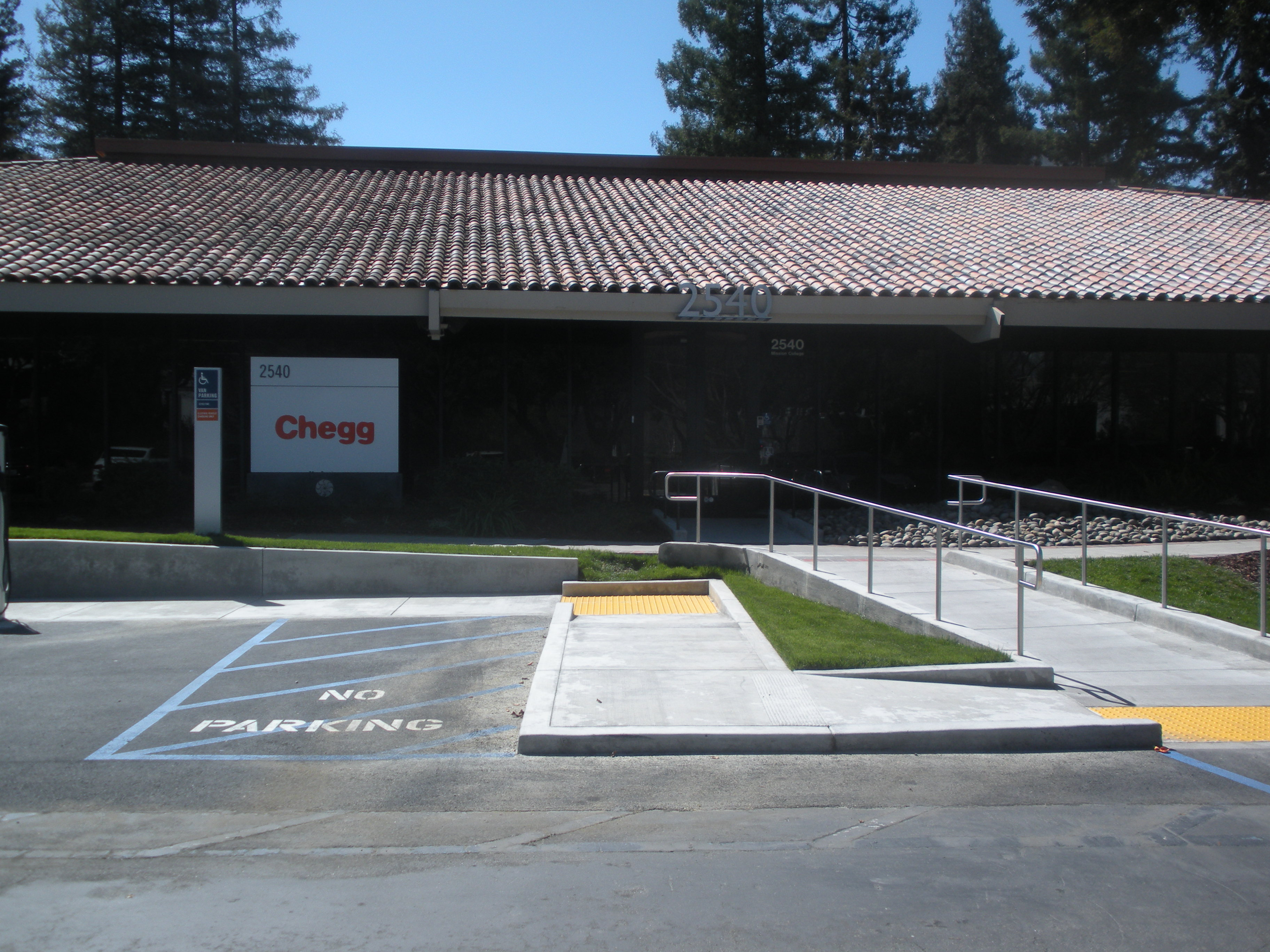
Chegg headquarters in Santa Clara

Chegg, Inc., is an American educational technology company based in Santa Clara, California. It provides homework help, digital and physical textbook rentals, textbooks, online tutoring, and other student services.

== History ==
=== Founding and early growth ===
Chegg originated as Cheggpost, a Craigslist-style message board for Iowa State University students launched in October 2000 by Josh Carlson, Mike Seager, and Mark Fiddleke. Carlson teamed with Osman Rashid, an avid user of the site who recognized its potential to disrupt the textbook market, and together with Aayush Phumbhra they incorporated the company in 2005, initially offering scholarship searches, internship matching, and college application advice. That same year, the founders purchased 2,000 textbooks and launched Textbookflix.com, a rental service modeled on Netflix.

After Carlson's departure in February 2006, Phumbhra and Rashid rebranded the service, launching it as Chegg in December 2007 with Rashid as CEO. The name Chegg is a combination of the words chicken and egg, and references the founders' catch-22 feeling of being unable to obtain a job without experience, while being unable to acquire experience without a job.

Growth was rapid: revenues exceeded $10 million in 2008, and the company surpassed that figure in January 2009 alone. That June, former Ask.com and Match.com CEO Jim Safka replaced Rashid as CEO, and in November 2009 the company raised $57 million in a financing round led by Insight Venture Partners.

=== Expansion and IPO ===
Dan Rosensweig, formerly CEO of Guitar Hero, took over as CEO in February 2010 and began shifting Chegg from a textbook rental business toward a broader digital learning platform. Under his leadership, Chegg added course selection and homework help features in 2011, raised an additional $25 million from 17 investors in 2012, and pursued an aggressive series of acquisitions (see below).

In November 2013, Chegg went public on the New York Stock Exchange at $12.50 per share, raising $187.5 million and achieving a valuation of $1.1 billion. The following year, Chegg partnered with Ingram Content Group to handle its physical textbook distribution, allowing the company to focus on digital services.

In April 2017, Chegg and Pearson Education entered a partnership whereby Pearson made 50 textbooks available exclusively for rent on Chegg. The relationship soured, however, and after the partnership ended in May 2021, Pearson sued Chegg for copyright infringement, alleging that Chegg had profited from selling answers to end-of-chapter questions in Pearson textbooks.

=== AI disruption and restructuring ===
In June 2021, Chegg launched Uversity, a platform for professors and educators to share content. The company's core business, however, came under severe pressure from generative AI. In May 2023, Chegg acknowledged that ChatGPT had become a serious competitor, and its stock fell 38% in a single day; the company responded by announcing Cheggmate, its own AI-powered platform.

Rosensweig stepped down as CEO in June 2024 after 14 years, becoming executive chairman, and was succeeded by longtime Chegg executive Nathan Schultz. The transition did not arrest the company's decline. By late 2024 Chegg was steadily losing subscribers, and in February 2025 the company sued Google, alleging that its AI Overviews feature diverted traffic away from Chegg's website.

Chegg cut approximately 248 employees, or 22% of its workforce, in May 2025. In October 2025, after a year-long strategic review conducted with Goldman Sachs that considered a sale and a go-private transaction, the board concluded that Chegg would remain a standalone public company. Alongside that announcement, Chegg laid off a further 388 employees (45% of the remaining workforce) and shifted its focus toward business-to-business skilling model, including professional language learning, workplace readiness, and AI-related skills courses. Chegg Skilling generated $68.7 million in revenue in 2025. Rosensweig returned as CEO, replacing Schultz, who became an executive adviser.

Chegg received notice from the New York Stock Exchange in December 2025 that its average closing share price had fallen below the exchange’s $1 minimum. The company regained compliance with the minimum share-price requirement on June 1, 2026, but received a second noncompliance notice in July after its average closing share price again fell below $1 over a consecutive 30-day trading period. The company was given six months to regain compliance.

In September 2026, Chegg repaid at maturity the remaining $33.9 million aggregate principal amount of its 0% convertible senior notes due that month, leaving the company with no outstanding debt.

=== Acquisitions ===
Chegg acquisitions include:

- CourseRank (August 2010), a website for rating and reviewing courses, disabled in 2014.
- Cramster.com (December 2010), a provider of online homework help.
- Notehall (July 2011), an online marketplace for class notes.
- Zinch (September 2011), a scholarship search service for high school students and college recruiters.
- 3D3R (November 2011), software company, to develop its digital textbook product, kickstart its mobile product group, and open an engineering office in Rehovot, Israel.
- InstaEDU (June 2014), an online tutoring platform obtained for $30 million, which was renamed Chegg Tutors.
- Internships.com (October 2014), for $11 million.
- Imagine Easy Solutions (May 2016), a provider of online bibliography and research tools, for $42 million.
- RefME (February 2017), a free citation management tool available on web, iOS and Android. It was shut down on March 7, 2017, and user accounts were transferred over to CiteThisForMe.
- Cogeon GmbH (October 2017), a German mathematics education provider, for €12.5 million in cash.
- WriteLab (May 2018), which uses artificial intelligence to analyze text and suggest improvements, for $15 million.
- StudyBlue (July 2018), an online flashcard tool, for $20.8 million.
- Thinkful (September 2019), an online coding, design, and data science school for $80 million cash, plus $20 million in cash or stock based on performance.
- Busuu (November 2021), a computer-assisted language learning service, for $436 million in cash.

== Controversies ==
=== Academic misconduct ===
Chegg has been accused of copyright infringement and facilitating academic dishonesty through its "homework help" service, in which paid "Chegg experts" solve homework questions submitted by students. Students also use the platform for file-sharing, posting homework question sheets and soliciting answers. A 2020 study found that Chegg answered questions even when they contained clear indicators that the student was attempting to cheat. Some universities explicitly forbid students from using the service, and some professors have posted fake answers on Chegg to identify students who cheat.

In February 2019, Chegg partnered with the Online Writing Lab (OWL) at Purdue University to make writing tools more accessible to students. The partnership drew faculty criticism for legitimizing a platform associated with cheating, though Purdue's guidelines explicitly prohibited using Chegg for that purpose.

The issue intensified during the COVID-19 pandemic, as students taking exams on personal computers faced no technical barriers to accessing Chegg simultaneously. Cheating incidents were reported at Georgia Tech, Boston University, the University of British Columbia, and Washington University in St. Louis, where solutions to a physics exam were posted on Chegg during the exam period. Chegg cooperated with the universities' investigations. There have also been cases of students being blackmailed by the Chegg employees who provided them with answers.

In August 2022, Chegg changed its "honor code policy" to limit the information it shared with universities about student activity, saying the change was to protect student privacy. Chegg was cited as an example of a cheating service in the United Kingdom's proposed Higher Education Cheating Services Prohibition Bill, and in October 2024, Australia's Tertiary Education Quality and Standards Agency sued Chegg for allegedly violating Australian laws against cheating services. On March 27, 2026, the Federal Court of Australia found that Chegg had contravened academic cheating laws on three occasions through its Expert Q&A service and ordered it to pay A$500,000 in penalties and A$150,000 in legal costs. A 2022 shareholder lawsuit accused the company of misleading investors, claiming that Chegg's growth was "largely due to the facilitation of cheating-an unstable business proposition-rather than the strength of its business model or the acumen of its senior executives and directors”.

=== Data breaches ===
In September 2018, Chegg disclosed that a data breach the previous April had potentially exposed the user names, passwords, email addresses, and shipping addresses of 40 million users; social security numbers and bank account information were not affected. The Federal Trade Commission subsequently investigated and in January 2023 finalized an order requiring the company to implement comprehensive security controls, enable consumer data access, and minimize data collection.

Patrnership:

In October 2026, Chegg signed a partnership agreement with some US government agencies to allow its Chegg Skills and Powertrain online training programs to be available to its employees.

== Philanthropy ==
Since July 2022, Chegg has partnered with the Varkey Foundation on the Global Student Prize, an annual $100,000 award recognizing students who have made a significant impact on learning and their communities. The company also sponsors Music 101, a college music instruction contest that pairs notable musicians with classroom instruction and awards a $10,000 grant from the David B. Goldberg Music Scholarship fund to the winning school's music department. Past participants have included Yungblud, U2, Imagine Dragons, Taylor Swift, Ed Sheeran, Shawn Mendes, Steve Aoki, and Liam Payne.

== See also ==
- Amazon textbook rentals
- BookRenter
- Course Hero
- CourseSmart
- Books on Google Play
- Tutor.com
- Zovio
