= Online tutoring =

Teaching via a remote computer connection

Online tutoring is the process of tutoring in an online, virtual, or networked, environment, in which teachers and learners participate from separate physical locations. Aside from space, participants can also be separated by time.

Online tutoring is practiced using many different approaches for distinct sets of users. The distinctions are in content and user interface, as well as in tutoring styles and tutor-training methodologies. Definitions associated with online tutoring vary widely, reflecting the ongoing evolution of the technology, the refinement and variation in online learning methodology, and the interactions of the organizations that deliver online tutoring services with the institutions, individuals, and learners that employ the services. This Internet-based service is a form of micropublishing.

== Concept and definitions ==
An institution, website or individual can offer online tutoring through an internal or external tutoring website or through a learning management systems (LMS). Online environments applied in education could also involve the use of a virtual learning environment platform such as Moodle, Sakai, WebCT, and Blackboard. Some of these are paid systems but some are free and open source such as Google+ Hangouts. Online tutoring may be offered either via a link in an LMS, or directly through the tutoring service's platform, where a subscriber may be required to pay for tutoring time before the delivery of service. Many educational institutions and major textbook publishers sponsor a certain amount of tutoring without a direct charge to the learner.

Tutoring may take the form of a group of learners simultaneously logged in online, then receiving instruction from a single tutor, also known as many-to-one tutoring and live online tutoring. This is often known as e-moderation, defined as the facilitation of the achievement of goals of independent learning, learner autonomy, self-reflection, knowledge construction, collaborative or group-based learning, online discussion, transformative learning and communities of practice. These functions of moderation are based on constructivist or social-constructivist principles of learning.

Another form of tutoring, called peer tutoring, connects peers, such as recent or fellow students within a course or subject, tutoring each other, and this may also be conducted as online tutoring over an online conferencing interface.

Most commonly, however, individual learners or their parents either purchase tutoring time with a private vendor of online tutoring service. Such time may also be made available through the purchase of a book, access to a library, a textbook publisher, or enrollment in a particular school or school system. This is known as one-on-one or private tutoring.

Asynchronous online tutoring is tutoring offered in a format in which the learner submits a question and the tutor responds at a later time. This is appropriate to detailed review of writing, for instance. It also enables cautious learners to retain control over how they submit questions and request assistance. The learner and the tutor need not be online at the same time.

Synchronous online tutoring involves a shared interface, such that both the tutor and the learner (or a group of learners) are online at the same time. This may or may not require the implementation of browser-based software and/or the learner to download proprietary software. Some online tutoring services may also use telephonic or VOIP communication, and/or video communication.

There are a number of private firms that provide online tutoring. A third-party online tutoring service offering asynchronous one-on-one tutoring was available as early as 1996.

From the very beginning of online tutoring, controversy surrounded several concerns voiced by educators and parents. Researchers recognized that online tutoring required three components:

1. online tutors adopt a specific pedagogy (educational method), encompassing both instructional and social support or group development;
2. online tutoring management coordinates and organizes the implementation of the service; and
3. unlike traditional face-to-face tutoring, online tutoring requires a usable user interface and technical support to maintain both the hardware and the software sides of the operation.

The questions raised by online tutoring include:

1. How does a parent or teacher know that the online tutor is qualified to give help, as opposed to simply giving answers to the learner?
2. Assuming the online tutor is qualified as an instructor, how does online tutoring relate to course instruction?
3. How reliable is the interface? Will it accommodate the discussion of the tutored material at a comparable level to a traditional classroom setting?

Within higher education, tutoring is considered to be adult-to-adult guidance within a specific course or subject for the clear purpose of advancing learning competence in an area of study. Generally, a tutor is an academic, a lecturer or professor who has responsibility for teaching in a degree/diploma program in a university or vocational teaching and learning setting. Learning centers at post-secondary school campuses may incorporate either e-moderating or one-to-one online tutoring, or both, creating a distance learning program, whether or not the campus or student courses are conducted online. In distance learning, tutors may be recruited specifically for the role of teaching and supporting students through online tutoring.

== History ==
Online tutoring first emerged in the late 1990s with platforms like Tutor.com (founded in 1998) offering homework help and subject-based support. As broadband internet became widespread in the 2000s, online tutoring platforms grew rapidly. By the early 2010s, services like Chegg Tutors, Wyzant, and Khan Academy were leading the shift toward personalized, flexible online learning.

The COVID-19 pandemic significantly accelerated online tutoring adoption as schools moved to remote learning. This shift made virtual tutoring a mainstream solution across education systems worldwide.

In recent years, tutoring platforms have integrated AI, gamification, analytics dashboards, and adaptive learning engines. Some platforms such as Varsity Tutors or Third Space Learning now use AI tutors or assistants to enhance personalized instruction and scalability.

=== Differences between online and face-to-face tutoring ===
Online tutoring began gaining traction in the late 1990s and early 2000s with the rise of dial-up internet and early platforms like Tutor.com (founded in 1998).

In the 2010s, improved broadband access, video conferencing tools (e.g., Skype, Zoom), and global marketplaces like Wyzant, Preply, and Chegg Tutors fueled adoption.

The COVID-19 pandemic accelerated this trend further, making online tutoring a mainstream learning method across age groups.

Recent advances now include AI-powered tutoring assistants, automated feedback systems, and interactive learning dashboards.

== Practice ==
=== Differences between online and face-to-face tutoring ===
In both online and face-to-face tutoring, similarities lie in the areas of group dynamics, need for roles within the group and design to encourage in-group interaction. Differences include the need for more facilitation to help structure discussions, with group roles emerging more slowly in the online setting.

There is a spectrum of intervention in online discussions from occasional guidance (assignment assistance) to full-scale design and support of learning groups and tasks (instruction). The first of these is known as tactical online tutoring and the second as strategic online tutoring.

=== Tactical online tutoring ===
Tactical tutors are expected to display sensitivity to group interactions and progress, or the lack thereof, and to respond within an online interaction at critical moments in which their mastery of the subject and ability to explain it is requested by the learner or in which the learner makes manifest errors. They are more likely than strategic tutors to be employed in one-on-one interfaces. Asynchronous tutoring allows a tutor to convey insight into strengths and weaknesses of a learner's work. Synchronous or live tutoring can provide help at the moment the learner becomes conscious of a problem and logs in.

==== Private online tutoring services ====
In general, academic online tutors are available through various virtual learning environments to help learners answer questions on specific subject matter, to help in the writing of essays, and to assist with research. Offerings vary from sites loosely associated with campuses, to sites directly contracted by and operating in concert with educational institutions, textbook publishers, or libraries. Access to the publisher or campus-provided online tutoring may be limited to just a few hours.

Other major concerns of parents or teachers in making use of online tutoring services include:

1. the perceived indifference of an online tutor to a learner's developmental issues that reach beyond a single session;
2. cultural communication difficulties that might arise between remote tutors and a local learner; and
3. doubts as to the academic qualifications of the online tutor, even if certified by a corporation.

=== Strategic online tutoring ===
Strategic tutors do more prior planning, including determining the number of learners per group and membership. Smaller groups are more likely to cultivate trust, whereas a larger group provides for greater heterogeneity and promotes interaction and task achievement. Six is reported to be the smallest size for good online work, and fifteen is the maximum for full participation. For strategic online tutoring, full participation depends upon robust connectivity and efficient use of bandwidth to guarantee full participation.

==== Design for group learning ====
The prior design of online activities, sometimes known as e-tivities, is one aspect of strategic tutoring. E-tivities promote peer group learning and result in less online tutoring time. E-tivities have the following characteristics:

- they can optimise student engagement if they are authentic and relevant learning activities;
- they can take any form of structured participative group work online; and
- they are based on one key topic or question to make online e-moderating easy and to provide motivation, engagement and purpose.

Worksheets, online bulletin boards, and threaded discussions are examples of tools for e-tivities. An e-tivity may be an effective learning tool if it has an illustrative title, a stimulus or challenge, involves invitations to learners to post messages, is carefully timed, has postings to which others can add, and summaries, critiques or feedback from the e-moderator.

Online tutors can take a similar approach using podcasts.

=== Scaffolding ===
Two necessary assumptions about online tutors is that they possess academic qualification sufficient to educate and that they have specific training to meet the challenges of online communication. Online tutors also need to be aware of the stages learners usually employ in the online environment; these stages determine the kinds of scaffolding (help) that is appropriate for learners at each stage. Salmon (2004) suggests five stages for learning and scaffolding appropriate to each:

1. Access and motivation
2. Online socialization
3. Information exchange
4. Knowledge construction
5. Development

== Critical success factors ==
=== Training and development ===
Staff who are inexperienced online will inevitably try to transfer into online tutoring what has worked for them in the past or what they believe is the only valid method for their discipline. Further, the values embedded in many commonly used VLEs contribute to counterproductive behaviors for online tutoring.

The key competencies needed by tutors are the abilities to:

- support group learning within the technology without the need for face-to-face meetings or pictures;
- provide scaffolding (see above);
- perceive and interpret online behaviors;
- weave, which includes:
  - Emphasizing a point to show wider application
  - Collecting snippets up from different messages and/or present in a new way
  - Redirecting questions to stimulate critical thinking and deeper learning
  - Highlighting contributions that link with others in ways the group has not noticed
  - Agreeing or disagreeing with group contributions
  - Correcting misunderstandings or insufficiency
- Summarize, which includes:
  - Acknowledging the variety of ideas expressed in contributions
  - Refocusing discussion, particularly where there are many contributions that stray from a central point
  - Signaling closure
  - Providing fresh starting points
  - Reinforcing important contributions or ideas
  - Providing an archive
- give feedback;
- classify participants' knowledge;
- add knowledge and correct misconceptions in a timely manner where necessary; and
- close discussions and move on.

The key features for staff development are online and face-to-face in character:

- Online training
  - Gain facility with the medium of online communication and with the specific user interface to be used
  - Model the online communication behavior expected of learner participants and students
  - Focus efforts on tutoring and moderating processes and methods and away from details of the technology
  - Use scaffolding (supporting ideas) that facilitates collaborative learning in preference to providing direct instruction
- Face-to-face
  - Focus on peer dialogue around models that are applicable in many settings
  - Provide authentic situations for tutors to practice weaving, summarizing, and giving feedback
  - Use fellow tutors as a resource when online development hits an obstacle

=== Dealing with characteristics of online environments ===
Online interaction is essentially verbal, so that nonverbal cues, often considered essential to the tutoring process, are not present. For example, in a text transferred back and forth online (asynchronous paper review), facial expressions, body movements and eye contact are not present. Both the tutor and the learner may need experience with the medium to get used to this. However, face-to-face meetings are not actually essential, since, with training, online tutors can exploit features of the online environment to communicate in new ways, such as by sketching on whiteboards or using a shared online calculator. The learner may be invited to reflect on the discussion or consult specific resources.

The learner, too, may more consciously prepare a message in advance, and may choose to log in to "meet" with the tutor according to his or her own schedule. Both synchronous (live) and asynchronous online tutoring typically preserve an online record of tutor remarks or a tutoring session. The learner can use this record for future reference.

== Self-led teams ==
As students become more experienced at working together online, some of the online facilitation roles can be delegated to the students. However, the students will need advice and training in order to become successful collaborators.

Advice and training for self-led teams should include:

- Establishing ground rules
- Developing a shared sense of vision and purpose
- Allocating roles, task and responsibilities
- Communicating openly and frequently
- Offering support
- Meeting deadlines
- Reviewing team performance and reflecting on contributions

== Effects of online tutoring ==
A 2005 study found that when it came to computer science studies, students who had online tutors performed about 30% better on an exam, where students who worked from a printed workbook performed about 20% better. A study in a similar field, online coaching, found a fairly large effect size of 0.77 for online coaching, with its cognitive effects being the largest.

Research in a similar area, online education, has found that generally speaking, students perform better through in-person education than in online education. An article from Chabot College claims that students in face-to-face classes in 2019 were roughly 3% more likely to succeed than their online peers, regardless of demographic. Research performed Linda Price and her team found that students were less inclined to participate in the course. Another paper by J.J. Arias and their team also found that students in face-to-face courses experienced "statistically significantly higher exam scores and statistically significantly greater improvement on post-test instructor questions", which is also supported by Price's research. The same research also found "no statistical difference post-test overall nor in the improvement of post-test standardized questions".

Effects of tutoring can also depend on a student's accessibility to wifi, their ability to adapt to an online space, and their preference for self-study vs. assisted study. Research found that students may perceive online tutoring as difficult with respect to these factors, such as "technical problems, communication barrier, lack of tutee information, and short tutoring duration". There has also been research that found online education performed similarly to in-person education.

With regards to intelligent tutoring systems (ITS), meta-analyses have generally found them to have statistically significant effects over no tutoring at all, though one study found them equal to regular classes, while another found them less effective than human tutoring (though whether or not this applies to both online and in-person or just one of them is not confirmed in the article). A separate study found contradicting information, finding that the effect size of human tutoring and an ITS were 0.79 and 0.76, respectively.

== Current developments ==
Online tutoring environments are moving beyond those offered by synchronous and asynchronous discussion technology, as often offered by VLEs. New opportunities for online tutoring are offered by Web 2.0 systems and multi-user virtual environments.

=== Web 2.0 ===
Web 2.0 encompasses the use of the web in increasingly interactive ways, with social networking and user-generated content being two critical benefits. Social networks can be used to connect tutors and students, and can allow students to help each other on a peer-to-peer basis. User-generated content can be created by and used by both tutors and students.

Online tutors may use Web 2.0 applications to render their online tutoring more flexible and current. For example, podcasts provide the advantage of the human voice, ease of use and mobile access to instruction (Salmon and Edisiringha 2008), and blogs may provide access to newly developed topics that can spur debate. Some online tutoring sites incorporated such tools into their interfaces even before Web 2.0 phenomena were widely discussed.

=== Multi-user virtual environments ===
Research is just beginning on the use of multi-user virtual environments (e.g. Second Life) and the role of avatars as Second Life tutors and learners.

=== Automated tutors ===
Online tutoring is one area for the application of various theories and implementations of tutoring provided to students by a computer. Companies involved in automated online tutoring include Wolfram Alpha, with its module called The Problem Generator (PG) Cognitive Tutor, and others. All automated tutoring involves an application of some form of artificial intelligence to emulate human tutoring, generate appropriate responses, and guide students interaction from one level of learning to the next.

The comparison of human and machine tutoring is an active area of study. For instance, it is unclear as of this time whether Cognitive Tutor is effective at improving student performance.

=== COVID-19 ===
The COVID-19 crisis of 2020 and the ensuing lock downs in many countries have led to increased online tutoring by both established online tutoring agencies as well as traditional schools adapting to the new environment. It has also led to the creation of many new online tutoring agencies, and interest in online tutoring still remains high after COVID-19. This has led to challenges on the technological site, but also for teachers not used to teaching online and parents not used to working from home with their children around.

For those who do have access to the right technology, there is evidence that learning online can be more effective in a number of ways. Some research shows that on average, students retain 25–60% more material when learning online compared to only 8–10% in a classroom.

=== Major platforms ===
Platform	Founded	Region	Features	Source
Wyzant	2005	US	On-demand 1-on-1 tutoring	
Khan Academy	2008	Global	Free video-based lessons, practice exercises	
Chegg Tutors	Acquired in 2014	US	24/7 chat, homework help	
Preply	2013	Global	Language tutoring marketplace	
Vedantu	2014	India	Interactive live classes	

== See also ==
- Distance education
- Live online tutoring
- List of online educational resources
- Peer mentoring
- Tutorials
