= Shmoop =

Online educational technology company

Shmoop University Inc.
- Company type: Private for-profit
- Industry: EdTech; Publishing; Test prep
- Founded: 2008; 18 years ago
- Founders: David Siminoff and Ellen Siminoff
- Headquarters: Scottsdale, Arizona, U.S.
- Key people: Andy Rahden, CEO
- Revenue: "single digit millions"
- Number of employees: 50 (2022)
- Website: www.shmoop.com

Shmoop University Inc. (popularly known as Shmoop) is a for-profit online educational technology company that specializes in test preparation materials, mental health tools, and learning content for K–12 schools. Shmoop offers free study guides aimed at teens on a range of subjects, including literature, biology, poetry, U.S. History, civics, financial literacy, and music.

The website also offers test prep materials for common standardized tests, such as the ACT and the SAT. Materials for these tests are part of a paid monthly subscription package.

== History ==
Shmoop started up in 2008, founded by Ellen Siminoff and David Siminoff, who had previous investments in several major tech companies. (Ellen Siminoff was a founding executive at Yahoo!). The initial content, focused on a high school English curriculum, was provided by David, and converted into mobile app form by Ellen. According to David Siminoff, the name "Shmoop" comes from a Yiddish word meaning "move something forward a little;" it was also his pet name for his young daughter Sophie.

The resources proved popular, and the Siminoffs started Shmoop as a nonprofit. After licensing Shmoop content to a number of school systems, the Siminoffs recognized the site's profit potential. They converted Shmoop into a student-focused digital publishing company, hiring accredited authors, and installing Ellen as CEO and David as Chief Creative Officer respectively.

In 2010, according to ZDNet, Shmoop had "4000 titles providing extensive, well-written analyses of both modern and classic literature, as well as history and current events, among an expanding set of topics, ... making Shmoop the largest cross-platform educational publisher in the world."

In 2017, Shmoop debuted a full suite of Next Generation Science Standards-aligned online science courses, covering core high school subjects such as biology, chemistry, earth science, physical science, physics, and more.

By 2019, Shmoop was providing test preps and "digital curriculum" to more than 1,200 school districts in the United States; the website's resources were being used by 16 million teachers and students monthly.

For its first decade, Shmoop was headquartered in Mountain View, California. In 2019, the company moved its operations to Scottsdale, Arizona. The same year, Andy Rahden took over as Shmoop's CEO, although Ellen and David Siminoff remain on the company's board.

In October 2019, Shmoop was a finalist in the Phoenix Entrepreneurial Opportunity Contest, sponsored by the Phoenix Business Journal and BBVA USA.

== Features ==
Shmoop's content is written by high-school or college-level teachers, and Ph.D. and master's degree students. The website's free learning guides focus on topics like literature, biology, poetry, the history of the United States, civics, and music. Shmoop's premium content requires a paid subscription plan, which can range in price depending on the different options.

Shmoop also offers resources for understanding Shakespeare called "Shmooping Shakespeare," which includes an "in-depth summary and analysis of every single one of his plays and many of his poems; an extensive biography; an entire section devoted to his most famous quotes and another devoted to the words he coined," as well as features like a Shakespeare "translator" and versions of his work in modern English.

In addition, Shmoop offers the following resources for high school students, college students, and teachers:

=== For high-schoolers ===
- test prep for Advanced Placement, ACT, PSAT/NMSQT, and SAT subject tests
- online courses that count toward college admissions requirements
- college resources section

=== For college students ===
- American Council on Education credit courses that count as transferable college credits (approved by the University of California and California State University systems)
- job searching guides

== Criticism ==
Because Shmoop provides study guides for literature that include "information likely to appear on tests, such as plot analyses, character information, and even key quotations," educators have seen the website as a cheating tool. These teachers argue that students can use Shmoop as a replacement for actually completing reading assignments with the original material.

Shmoop states that it does not support academic dishonesty or plagiarism. Instead, it suggests that students read the original material, and then check Shmoop to compare their own interpretation of the text with the Shmoop analysis.

Quoting Carl Fisher, the chair of the comparative world literature and classics department of California State University, Long Beach, Shmoop was also criticized by The New York Times for the irreverent tone it employs in its study guides: "'It makes an interesting attempt to be hip,' he said, 'but it is just so high school-y.'" The Times also faulted Shmoop for misspelling the last name of the English author Virginia Woolf in one of the company's study guides.

== See also ==
- BookRags
- CliffsNotes
- Coles Notes
- Quizlet
- Schaum's Outlines
- SparkNotes
- York Notes
