= Blinkist =

German book-summarizing subscription service

- Type: GmbH
- Industry: Internet
- Founded: August 21, 2012; 14 years ago
- Founder: Holger Seim; Niklas Jansen; Sebastian Klein; Tobias Balling
- Headquarters: Berlin, Germany
- Products: Blinkist App
- Total assets: ▲US$35 million (2018)
- Parent: Go1 Pty Ltd
- Website: blinkist.com

Blinks Labs GmbH is a German book-summarizing subscription service based in Berlin. It provides summaries of over 6,500 titles, including bestselling nonfiction books in fifteen-minute reads, otherwise known as Blinks. The summaries are available in English, German and Spanish.

== History ==
Blinkist was founded in August 2012 by college friends Holger Seim, Tobias Balling, Niklas Jansen and Sebastian Klein. In 2013, Blinkist had its public launch.

In 2018, Blinkist raised $18.8 million in funding led by venture capital firm Insight Venture Partners.

In May 2023, Blinkist was acquired by the Australian ed-tech startup Go1.

== See also ==
- 60second Recap
- CliffsNotes
- Chegg
- Course Hero
- eNotes
- SparkNotes
