= 60second Recap =

Classic literature educational video website

- Website type: Internet video study guide
- Available in: English
- Website: 60secondrecap.com
- Registration: Optional
- Launched: September 3, 2009
- Current status: Inactive

60second Recap is an educational video project launched in September 2009 to provide 60-second video summaries and analysis of classic literature. The site provides one-minute video commentaries on plot, themes, characters, symbols, motifs, and other aspects of books commonly studied in secondary schools in North America.

A year after its launch, 60second Recap's website offered over 400 videos covering 35 classic literary works and 60 contemporary titles. It had also received more than 4.5 million website visits. During its second year, 60second Recap continued to add to its content library, with new 60second Recap video "albums" of 10-15 individual videos covering various aspects of a work such as Beowulf or Hamlet. The website currently presents approximately 800 videos encompassing 42 classic literary works, and over 250 reviews of contemporary books of potential interest to teenagers.

== History ==
60second Recap was created by Peter Osterlund, a former journalist who, while working as a Hollywood screenwriter, began exploring media formats suitable for smartphones and other handheld devices. He said he decided to structure his concept around a 60-second video format upon noting that viewer's attention to "small-screen" video tended to lapse after about one minute. Media interest in 60second Recap's subsequent launch focused on two novel aspects of its design. First, 60second Recap offered a new variation on an old form by presenting its study aid material in a video-only format based on Osterlund's 60-second concept. Second, all editorial content was researched and written by a single individual, Jenny Sawyer, a book critic for The Christian Science Monitor who also served as 60second Recap's host. Sawyer said this approach was intended to help students see 60second Recap not as a "cheat-sheet authority" but as a "conversation-starter" on a given work.

== Video format controversy ==
Some online critics took exception to 60second Recap's video-centric approach. They argued that 60second Recap's format trivialized Elie Wiesel's Holocaust memoir Night by summarizing its plot and themes in a series of twelve 60-second videos. One journalist contended that 60second Recap-style study videos might encourage students to avoid reading altogether.

== Classroom acceptance ==
60second Recap won acceptance in schools, however, and teachers said they found it effective in sparking classroom discussions. 60second Recap was also cited by special education teachers as a pedagogical tool for students who have learning disabilities that interfere with their ability to comprehend written material.

== Industry response ==
In 2011, CliffsNotes announced a joint venture with AOL and reality TV show producer Mark Burnett to introduce its own series of 60-second video study guide surveys of classic literary works.

== See also ==
- BookRags
- CliffsNotes
- Coles Notes
- Video study guide
- York Notes
