= Permacharts =

Permacharts Inc.
- Company type: Privately held
- Industry: Educational products publisher
- Founded: 1980
- Headquarters: Concord, Ontario, Canada
- Area served: Worldwide
- Key people: Carmine Bello
- Website: http://www.permacharts.com

Permacharts Inc. is a Canadian company based in Concord, Ontario, and they are the publisher of quick reference guides on over 500 subjects. All Permacharts Quick Reference Guides are available in digital or printed and laminated form. Study guides. Along with other study guide manufacturers like SparkNotes, CliffsNotes and Schaum's Outlines, they control most of the North American market share for study guides.

== History ==
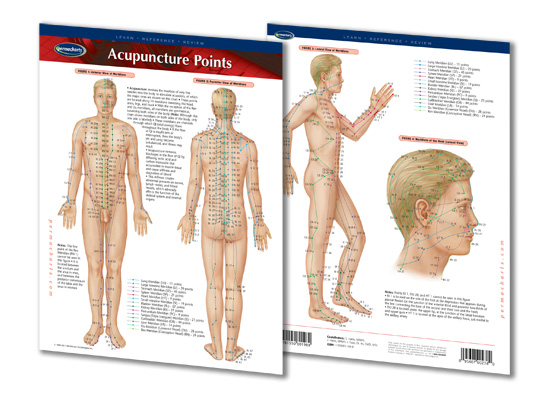
Quick reference chart from Permacharts - Acupuncture Points

Permacharts was founded in 1980 by Carmine Bello. He is also noted as an author with a number of literary works to his name. Clearkote Slotted Hinge, a proprietary process which is used in the production line of the Permachart was developed by Bello. Permachart products are used in a number of schools and universities across North America, including Harvard University, University of California, and the Eastern Illinois University.

Permacharts products are available for hundreds of subjects, organized into 11 general categories. Each Permachart quick reference guide is carefully researched and summarized by a Permacharts subject matter expert (SME). Every chart is created with the goal of carefully balancing ease-of-understanding with the breadth of content to make sure that it provides the most usefulness to the reader. Authors who work for Permacharts include Arshad Ahmad, Don Cartwright, Maureen Connolly, Alex Fancy, Ron Marken, and Terry Matheson.

== Corporate activity ==
Along with the Hippocrates Health Institute, Permacharts Inc. is one of the two major sponsors behind the Permacharts Helping Hands Program, which promotes vegan lifestyle in North America.

== Geographical spread ==
The main offices of Permacharts are located in Concord, Ontario and Cheektowaga, New York. The quick reference guides are available worldwide through a wide network of distributors or from online bookstores like Follett and VitaSource.

== See also ==
- Study guides
- Homework
- Study skills
