= Carl and Jack Cole =

American businessmen

Carl Cole
- Born: Carl Kolofsky; Detroit, Michigan, U.S.
- Died: 1994
- Occupation: Businessman
- Spouse: Pearl Cole
- Children: 2
- Relatives: Jack Cole (brother) Mary (sister) Sarah (sister)

Jack Cole
- Born: Isadore Kolofsky; May 4, 1920; Detroit, Michigan, U.S.
- Died: January 22, 1997 (aged 76)
- Occupation: Businessman
- Spouse: Esther Cole
- Children: 4
- Relatives: Carl Cole (brother) Mary (sister) Sarah (sister)

Carl and Jack Cole, born Carl Kolofsky and Isadore Kolofsky, were American-Canadian brothers who created the successful bookstore chain Coles as well as the world-famous publication Coles Notes. Carl (died 1994) and Jack (May 4, 1920 – January 22, 1997) made Coles the largest bookstore chain in Canada in the mid- to late-20th century.

== Early life ==
Jack and Carl were born in Detroit, but the family moved to Toronto, Ontario, Canada, when Jack was quite young.

Jack attended Harbord Collegiate Institute, but dropped out of high school after completing grade 10 in order to help provide for his family. Carl attended Oakwood Collegiate Institute in Toronto.

In 1935, at age 15, Jack and his brother Carl opened The Book Exchange, their first bookstore. It was located at Bloor and Spadina and specialized in second-hand books for the University of Toronto.

== World War II ==
Jack joined the Royal Canadian Air Force upon Canada's entry into War. Due to his limited formal education, Jack started as a private, but within six months was promoted to a captain and stationed in England. At the same time, brother Carl ran the bookstore, which was thriving in Canada.

== Coles Notes ==
Jack and Carl first published Coles Notes in 1948. The first edition was for the French novel Colomba by Prosper Mérimée.

There have been over 80,000,000 copies of Coles Notes sold in over 70 countries. They are currently owned by Indigo Books in Canada.

== 1950s and 1960s ==
In 1958, Jack and Carl sold the American rights to Coles Notes to Cliff Hillegass, who published the books under the Cliff's Notes moniker.

By 1960, Coles Notes sales peaked when baby boomers were beginning to attend high school. At their peak, there were over 120 titles, mostly dealing with English novels, but they also had numerous other subjects, including languages, mathematics, and physics.

In the 1960s, Hillegass gradually eliminated the Cole's version of the notes in favor the Cliff's brand.

== 1970s ==
On June 7, 1972, the brothers took Coles Bookstore public, with Jack and Carl still retaining control over the business. At the time, Coles Bookstore had over 200 stores operating across Canada.

Beginning in 1973, Jack and Carl opened over 50 stores in the United States, but this venture was not very successful. In 1987 Southam Inc. sold the remaining 52 stores to Waldenbooks.

In 1978, Jack and Carl sold their interest in Coles Bookstore to Southam Press for a reported C$34 million. Jack remained as president of the company until the early 1980s.

== World's Biggest Bookstore ==
In 1980, Jack opened the World's Biggest Bookstore at the site of a former bowling alley. At the time, it was the largest bookstore in the world at 67,000 square feet (6,200 m^{2}). It was located in downtown Toronto on Edward Street. Although the business is owned by Indigo Books and Music, the building is owned by the Cole family.

On June 20, 2012, Stuart Smith of CBRE Commercial Real Estate Services announced the lease on the store's building, which was set to expire at the end of 2013, would not be renewed by Indigo Books and Music. In March 2014, the World's Biggest Bookstore officially closed.
