= David Siminoff =

American entrepreneur and investor

- Born: David Ellis Siminoff; 1964 (age 61–62); California, U.S.
- Education: B.A., Master of Fine Arts, USC Film School, 1989; MBA, Stanford Business School, 1993
- Occupations: Entrepreneur, Investor
- Years active: 1994–present
- Spouse: Ellen Siminoff (m. 1994)
- Children: 2

David E. Siminoff is a Silicon Valley investor and entrepreneur.

== Biography ==
=== Education ===
Siminoff graduated with Honors from Stanford University. In 1986, he was a member of the varsity swimming & diving team, which went on to win multiple Pacific-10 Conference and NCAA Championships. He later earned an MFA from the USC Film School in 1989 and an MBA from Stanford Business School in 1993.

=== Career ===
He founded barter company EastNet in Moscow and Eastern Europe. He Joined Capital Research after selling EastNet, graduating from Stanford Graduate School of Business.

At Capital Research he focused on the technology, media, and telecommunications sectors, and his fund was an early investor in Yahoo!, eBay, Amazon, PayPal, Netflix and America Online. He was voted Best of the Buyside by Institutional Investor (magazine) in 1997, 98, 99 and 2000. He became an early investor in Facebook, along with his jet ownership partner, Mark Pincus. He is an IFR-rated private pilot with over 2,500 hours of flight time. He joined the board of coupons.Com/Quotient before its ipo, running the audit committee. He sat on private boards and helped launch a number of venture capital funds, including Formation 8/ 8VC, run by Joe Lonsdale.

He later worked as the chief executive officer of Spark Networks, a publicly traded firm which is the parent company of JDate. He was a general partner at Venrock, the Rockefeller family's venture capital arm. In 2008 the Siminoffs co-founded Shmoop, an online educational technology publishing company that specializes in test preparation materials and study guides. Siminoff remains as Chief Creative Officer of Shmoop. He subsequently founded SimSim.

== Personal life ==
Siminoff and his wife used to live in Los Altos Hills. They met while students at Stanford Graduate School of Business. They have two children.

He and his wife live in Teton Village, Wyoming where he is involved in a wide range of Wyoming activities, co-hosting the Wyoming Global Technology Summit with Jack Selby, Peter Thiel and John Temte. He also sat in the kitchen cabinet of Senator Cynthia Lummis. He has sat on the Astrophysics Board at Princeton University since 2019 and runs a Radio-Phototropic observatory built into his home in Wyoming. Siminoff is an amateur paleontologist (Golden Bone) and active pilot, formerly sharing flight duties with Eclipse Aviation partner Mark Pincus, the founder of Zynga.
