= Harbord Collegiate Institute =

High school in Toronto, Ontario, Canada

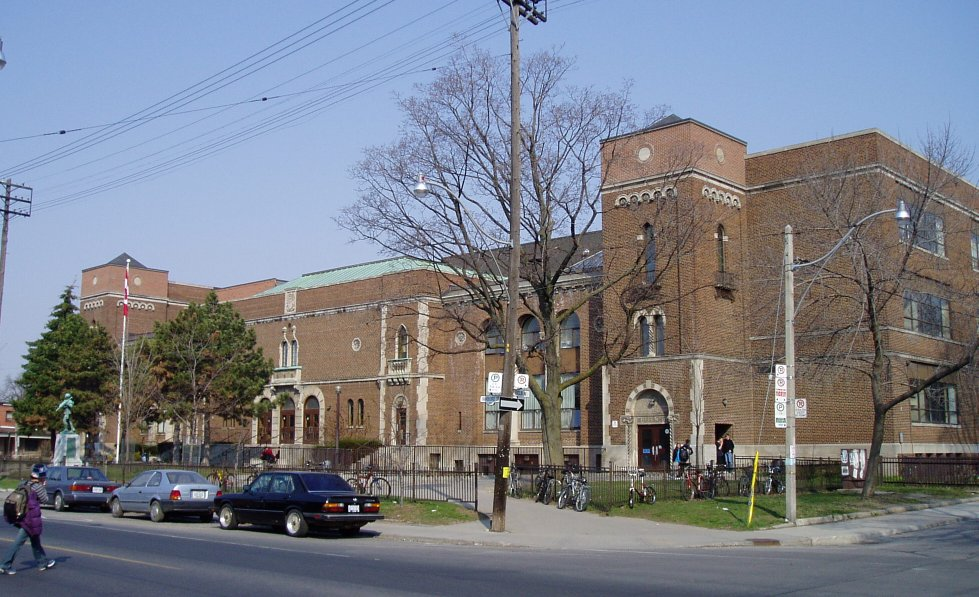

Location
- 286 Harbord Street; Toronto, Ontario, M6G 1G5; Canada; 43.661228°N 79.414272°W

Information
- School type: High school
- Motto: Virtus et Doctrina
- Founded: 1892
- School board: Toronto District School Board
- Superintendent: Erin Altosaar
- Area trustee: Deborah Williams
- Principal: Tania Camuti
- Faculty: 50
- Grades: 9–12
- Enrolment: 979 (2019–20)
- Language: English, French
- Schedule type: Semestered
- Colours: Orange and black
- Mascot: Tiger
- Team name: Harbord Tigers
- Website: schoolweb.tdsb.on.ca/harbordci/
- Last updated: April 17, 2025

Harbord Collegiate Institute (HCI or Harbord) is a public secondary school located in downtown Toronto, Ontario, Canada. The school is located in the Palmerston-Little Italy-Annex neighbourhood, situated on the north side of Harbord Street, between Euclid Avenue and Manning Avenue. From the 1920s to the 1950s, about 90 percent of the student body was Jewish, while today the student body largely consists of students of East Asian and Portuguese descent.

== History ==
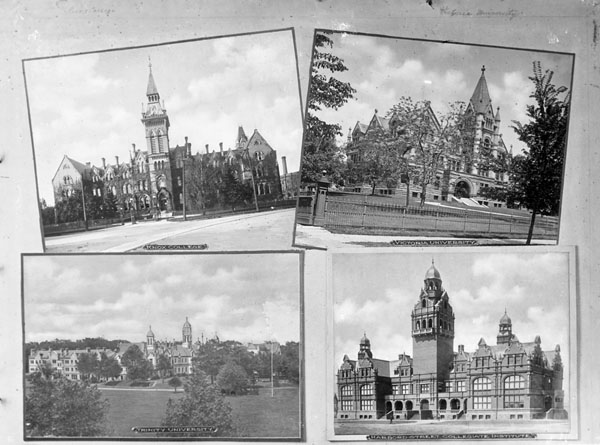
Knox College, Victoria University, Trinity University, Harbord Street Collegiate Institute 1900-1925

Harbord was opened in 1892 as the Harbord Street Collegiate Institute. Harbord's first centennial was celebrated in 1992 and included the inauguration of the Harbord museum, a repository of Harbord memorabilia. To mark the event, Harbord's alumni group, the Harbord Club, published a 300-page history of the school entitled The Happy Ghosts of Harbord, which traces the history of the school from its opening in 1892 to 1992. The original school building was Jacobethan Revival and replaced with the Collegiate Gothic wing in 1932.

On November 11, 2005, a Remembrance Day ceremony took place at Harbord. With the donations from the W. Garfield Weston Foundation and many other corporate sponsors and individuals, the rededication of the 1921 World War I monument back to its original splendour was held. In May 2007, a second monument created to remember World War II was revealed in another ceremony.

=== Harbord Club ===
The Harbord Club has 2600 members. It was established in 1978. The Harbordite, founded in 1979, is the club newsletter that keeps former students of the school in contact with one another and up-to-date on Harbord activities. The Harbord Charitable Foundation was also created at this time, supporting both student scholarships and alumni activities.

=== Notable alumni ===
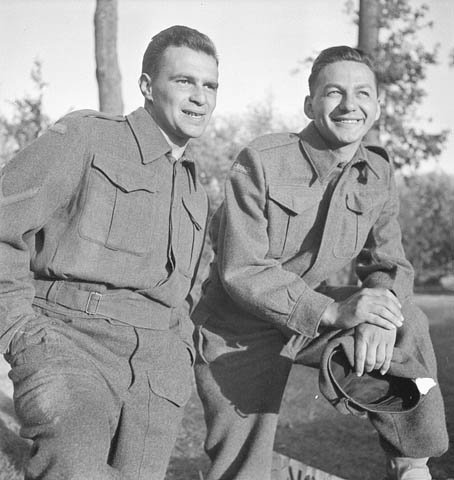
Comedy duo Wayne and Shuster met as students at Harbord

- Zanana Akande - Ontario NDP MPP and first Black woman Cabinet minister in Canada
- Charles Best - co-discoverer of insulin
- Kathleen Coburn - scholar of the works of Samuel Taylor Coleridge
- David Cronenberg - filmmaker
- Jack Cole - founder of Coles (bookstore)
- Charles Trick Currelly - founder and first curator of the Royal Ontario Museum
- Victor Feldbrill - founder Conductor of the Toronto Symphony Orchestra
- Helen Freedhoff - theoretical physicist
- Murray Frum, real estate developer and philanthropist
- Frank Gehry - architect and designer
- Adam Giambrone - former Toronto city councillor and TTC chair
- Philip Givens - former Toronto Mayor
- Eddie Goodman - former Lawyer and politician
- Paul James, award-winning Canadian blues and roots musician; stage name of Paul James Vigna.
- Irving Kaplansky - mathematician
- Max Kerman - Juno Award-winning Lead Singer of Arkells
- Katerina Lanfranco - artist
- Stephen Lewis - former leader of the Ontario NDP, former UN Ambassador, UN Special Envoy for HIV/AIDS in Africa
- Howie Mandel - actor
- Joe Pantalone - former Toronto city councillor
- Reva Potashin - psychology professor
- Louis Rasminsky - former Governor of the Bank of Canada
- Harry Rosen — clothier
- Lee Ross - social psychologist
- Morley Safer - CBS News Anchor
- Anna Sandor - screenwriter
- Sam Shopsowitz - founder of Shopsy's restaurant
- Sam Sniderman - founder of Sam the Record Man
- Ruth Elizabeth Spence (1890-1982) - teacher and historian
- Steven Staryk - violinist
- Gordon Stulberg - President of 20th Century Fox
- Kiefer Sutherland - actor
- Johnny Wayne and Frank Shuster (Wayne and Shuster) - comedians
- Philip White - former Mayor of York, Ontario

== Demographics ==
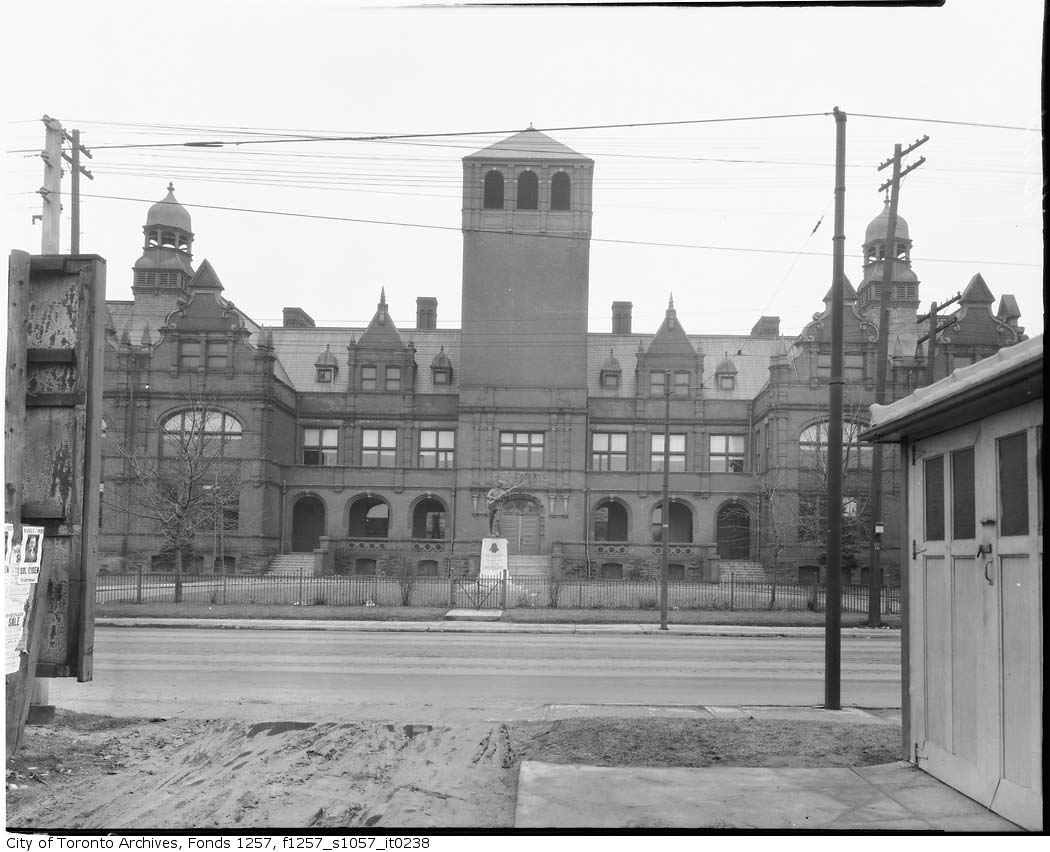
HCI before 1932 featuring the original Jacobethan Revival façade

From the 1920s to the 1950s, about 90% of the student body was Jewish. Today, the student body largely consists of students of Korean and Portuguese descent, which is representative of the surrounding neighbourhoods. Many of the clubs at Harbord are reflective of the ethnic groups present. The Harbord language program offers courses in Spanish, French, Portuguese and German.

Harbord has three French programs: Immersion, Extended and Core French. These classes offer students an opportunity to become bilingual in Canada's official languages. Harbord also has a full ESL (English as a Second Language) program which helps students new to Canada to learn English.

== Clubs ==
The Student Activity Council, or SAC, is one of the largest student-run organisation at Harbord Collegiate Institute. TigerTalk is Harbord's official newspaper. It covers topics related to the school as well as a variety of other topics. It has won awards from the Toronto Star's high school newspaper competition.

The Key Club is an international student-led organisation which aims to provide its members with opportunities to provide service, build character, thrive and develop leadership."

The Business Club gather at lunch and/or after school to learn about business topics. They participate in business competitions including DECA and JA Titan. The "Tiger Techs" are Harbord's robotics team. They participate as team 919 in the FIRST Robotics Competition.

== Arts ==
=== Visual Arts ===
Harbord offers a visual arts program for each grade exposing students to materials, concepts and skills. Studios offer lessons in drawing, painting, ceramics, printmaking, photography, animation, design, and life drawing. Studies in design allow students to partake in fashion design (an annual fashion show), architectural design and interior design as well as text and graphic design. Art history is woven into the assignments as is theory in aesthetics. Student work can be viewed at the Creative Arts Festival held every year.

=== Band ===
The band program goes from the Grade 9 Beginner Band to the Grade 12 Senior Band. Instruments in the band include flute, clarinet, saxophone, French horn, trombone, tuba, bass guitar, keyboard, drums, baritone and trumpet. The band performs at assemblies and concerts.

=== Vocal ===
The classes range from Grade 9 Beginner Vocal to Senior Vocal. There is a Cantemus Choir at Harbord that sings for events inside and outside of Harbord. The choir has participated in the Kiwanis Festival.

=== Strings ===
The classes include the Grade 9 Beginner Strings, the Junior Strings and the Senior Strings. Instruments available for strings at Harbord include: violin, viola, cello and bass. Harbord's String Quartet won First Prize at last year's Kiwanis Festival. The Chamber Orchestra has performed at other venues such as Massey Hall, and George Weston Hall. The Strings Chamber Orchestra plays at school events.

=== "Onward Harbord" ===
"Onward Harbord" is Harbord's official song, and is sung along with the school band playing at the same time. It is sung to the tune of the fight song "On, Wisconsin!"; Harbord is one of some 2,500 schools using some variation of this piece as their school song.

== See also ==
- Education in Ontario
- List of secondary schools in Ontario
- List of educational institutions in Toronto
- List of oldest buildings and structures in Toronto
- Education in Toronto
