= Test preparation =

Preparation for standardized tests

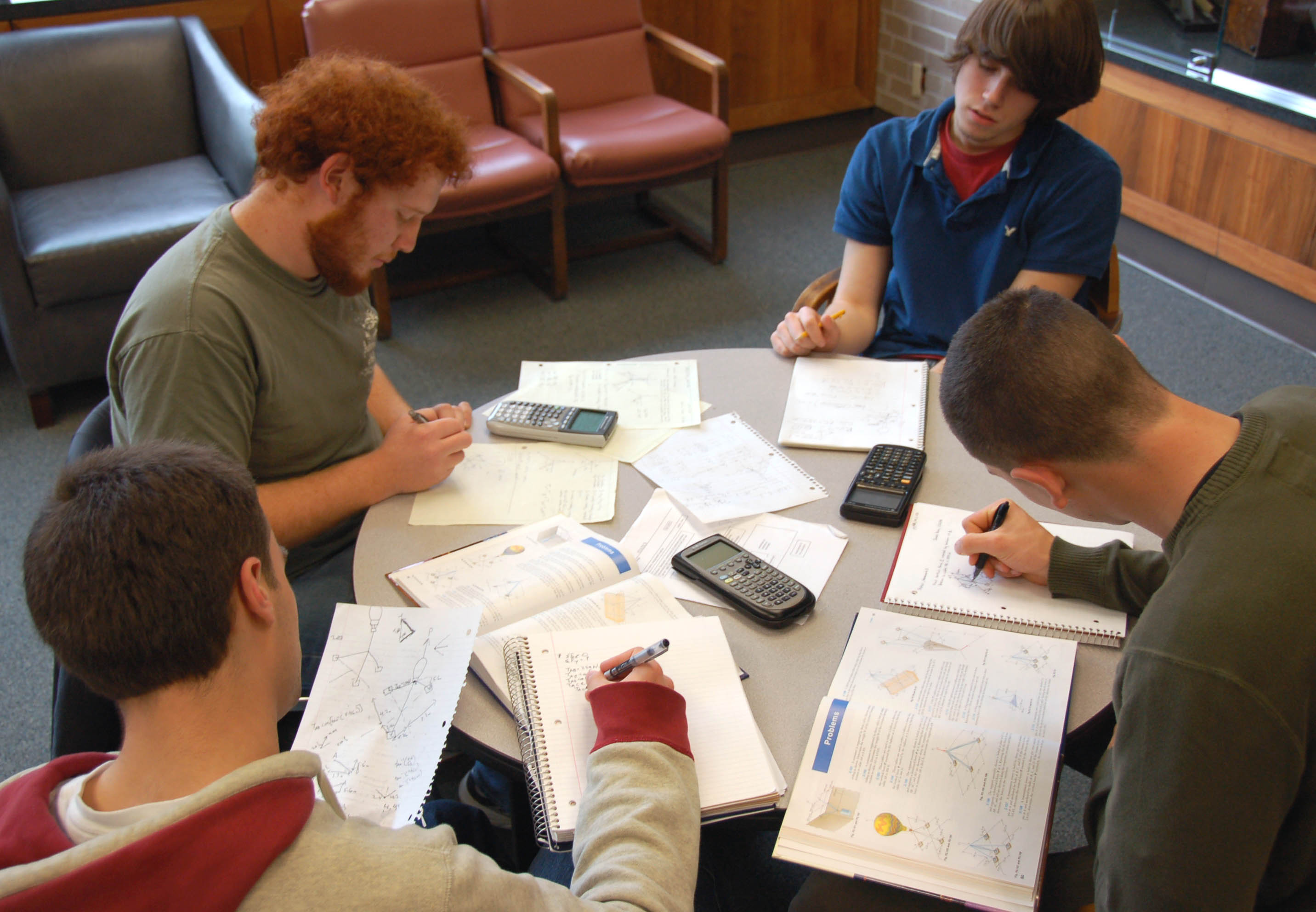
A group of students preparing for a test

Test preparation (abbreviated test prep) or exam preparation is an educational course, tutoring service, educational material, or a learning tool designed to increase students' performance on standardized tests. Examples of these tests include entrance examinations used for admissions to institutions of higher education, such as college (e.g. the SAT and ACT), business school (the GMAT), law school (the LSAT or LNAT), medical school (the MCAT, BMAT, UCAT and GAMSAT) and graduate school (the GRE) and qualifying examinations for admission to gifted education programs.

== Preparation options ==
There are many resources and services on which students may draw as they prepare for standardized tests, including:

- Courses: Many test preparation courses are designed to expose students to the breadth of topics tested on the relevant exam and guide them through the process of studying.
- Flashcards: Index cards imprinted with information used as a study aid to reinforce memory retention.
- Mind maps: Mind maps allow students to visually organize relevant concepts and information, showing relationships among pieces of the whole.
- Mock exams: Mock examinations help students prepare for the real exams. They are intended to give students a clear indication of the structure and content of the actual exam and experience of examination conditions, whilst also offering them a snapshot of their current performance.
- Study groups: Studying as group facilitates collaboration and exposes students to different perspectives on the material.
- Study guides: Various organizations and individuals produce published materials that students can incorporate into their preparation.
- Tutors: A tutor is a person with whom students work one-on-one to improve academic performance, in this case on an exam.

== Resource providers ==
Most companies and educators that offer test preparation services also offer traditional (hard copy) such as books and printed materials and technology or online-based learning tools, such as content accessible on hand-held devices such as smartphones, tablets and laptops. So do most test makers, publishers of self-help, instructional and educational materials, and makers of hardware and software.

=== Test makers ===
- ACT, Inc. - publisher of the ACT
- American Council on Education (ACE) - publisher of the GED test
- Association of American Medical Colleges (AAMC) - publisher of the MCAT test
- College Board - publisher of the SAT test
- Educational Testing Service (ETS) - publisher of the GRE and TOEFL tests
- Elsevier - publisher of the HESI exam
- Graduate Management Admission Council (GMAC) - publisher of the GMAT
- Harcourt Assessment - publisher of the Miller Analogies Test (MAT)
- Law School Admissions Council (LSAC) - publisher of the LSAT test
- National Restaurant Association - publisher of the ServSafe

=== Third parties ===
- Barron's Educational Series - publisher of books and educational materials
- CliffsNotes - publisher of study guides
- The Complete Idiot's Guides - publisher of instructional reference books
- For Dummies - publisher of instructional/reference books
- Gary Gruber - educator and author
- McGraw-Hill - publisher of books and educational materials
- Peterson's - publisher of books and educational materials
- SparkNotes - publisher of study guides
- Study Notes - publisher of study guides
- Texas Instruments - technology company that offers test-maker approved calculators and a variety of test preparation and test-taking tools
- NurseNest - a company that provides test preparation for nursing students in Canada/United States

== Criticism ==
Some test-preparation programs have been proven to help students improve test scores, but others may have little effect.

== See also ==
- Cram school
