= People to People Student Ambassador Program =

Travel service

- Formation: September 11, 1956
- Type: Youth Peace Ambassador/Travel
- Headquarters: Spokane, Washington
- Parent organization: Ambassadors Group

The People to People Student Ambassador Program was a travel service based in Spokane, Washington, offering domestic and international travel opportunities primarily to American middle and high school students aged 10 through 18. The group was founded in 1956, during the Eisenhower administration, and reincorporated in 1995. It converted in 2002 to a for-profit company, Ambassadors Group.

Nearly half a million students, adults and athletes participated in the ambassador programs. In the late 20th century, the typical length of a program was three weeks for a group of thirty to forty students. It ceased student travel operations in July 2015.

== History ==
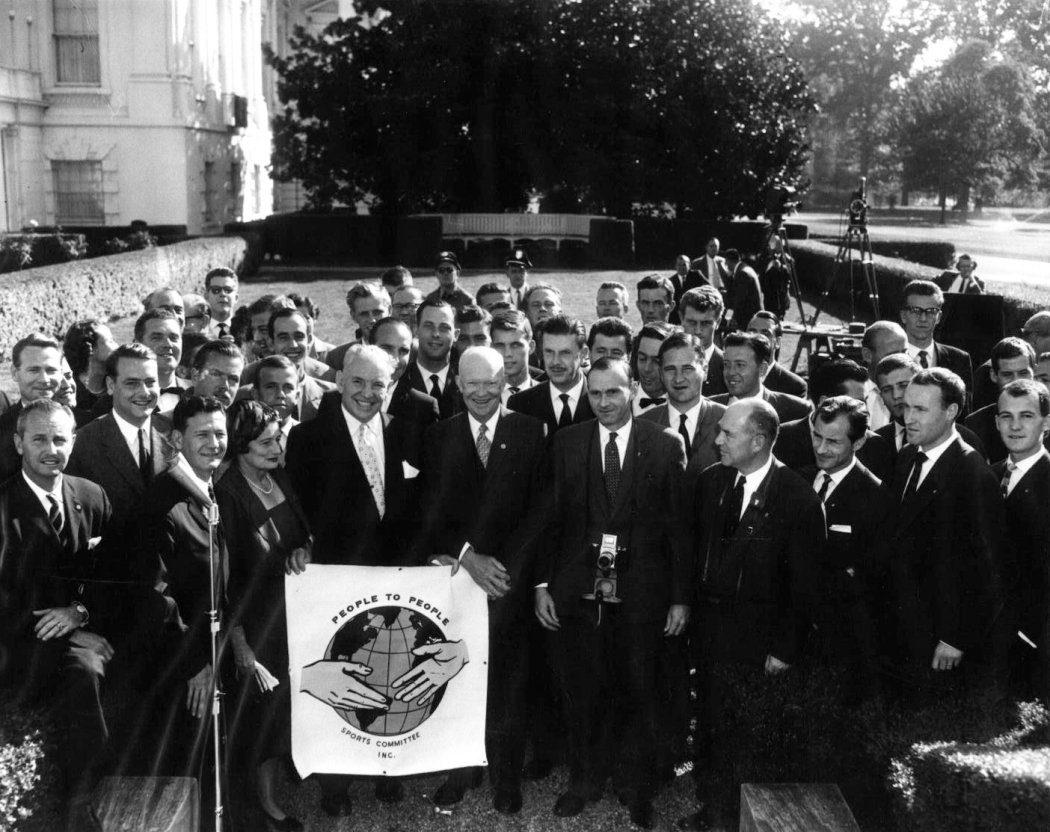
President Dwight D. Eisenhower with the People to People committee in 1960.

In 1956, U.S. President Dwight D. Eisenhower sought diplomatic alternatives to the wars he witnessed as a soldier, general and Allied Commander. On September 11, 1956, he called a White House conference of 100 top American leaders, who joined him in creating the People to People initiative, focused on creating cultural exchange programs. This conference followed a Geneva summit, at which Eisenhower and Soviet Premier Nikita Khrushchev expressed enthusiasm for exchange programs as a means to ease Cold War tensions. Participants in this conference included Joyce Hall, founder of Hallmark Cards; comedian Bob Hope; and creative entertainer Walt Disney. He became one of the founding directors of People to People and later drew inspiration from the initiative to create the "It's a Small World" attraction at Disneyland in 1964.

The program was originally sponsored by the U.S. Information Agency, of the Federal government. In 1961, Eisenhower decided that it should be carried on by private citizens and asked Joyce Hall to facilitate the privatization. That same year, the nonprofit People to People International began a contractual relationship with Ambassador Programs, Inc. to administer People to People travel programs for adults and students. In 1962, the first delegation of university students traveled overseas and stayed with families across Europe.

Regular annual programs began in 1967. Until expansion in the 1980s, the organization sent only a few hundred students abroad each year. In 2002, People to People International granted a license to operate student programs under the People to People Student Ambassador Program name to Ambassadors Group, which had been formed as a separate company from the Ambassadors Education Group. The Company closed in 2015.

== Programs ==
People to People Ambassador Programs offered four types of ambassador travel, including international student ambassador travel, domestic leadership ambassador summits and forums, international collegiate ambassador travel, and international citizen ambassador travel for industry professionals.

Countries visited included Germany, France, Canada, Czechoslovakia, Austria, Denmark, the Netherlands, Australia, New Zealand, China, Japan, Korea, Taiwan, Hong Kong, Malta, Italy, Greece, Fiji, the Republic of Ireland, the United Kingdom and Russia. Experienced students who were alumni of the program and wanted to travel again were given the chance to choose more exotic destinations for subsequent trips such as South Africa, or Antarctica. Programs typically departed between June and August, rather than during the academic year, in groups of between thirty and forty students. The target student-teacher ratio was 10-to-1.

Trips usually were composed of students from a given city or county, not from a specific school. Tuition – the fees charged for a trip – ranged from $4,500 for trips to Canada, to more than $7,999 for trips to Australia and South Pacific destinations. A trip to Antarctica was available for $12,500, however this fee was not listed on their website in 2014.

During the trips, students attended various educational activities, and had the chance to meet local leaders and dignitaries. Trips also featured such outdoor activities as hiking, snorkeling, zip-lining or rappelling. Longer itineraries included a 2- to 3-day home stay with a local family.

Each student ambassador travel program included a service component in which ambassadors participated in hands-on community service projects. Participants could earn high school or college credit for classes through the Washington School of World Studies (operated by People to People), and through Eastern Washington University.

People to People Ambassador Programs also offered domestic student trips for grade school, middle school and high school students through Leadership Ambassador Programs. These programs were focused on leadership development, community involvement, civics education and college preparation. Leadership Ambassador Programs included student trips to various U.S. destinations, including Washington D.C., New York City, Chicago, and Los Angeles, to hear from speakers and industry experts, and exchange ideas with their peers from around the world. On these four- to ten-day programs, delegates engaged in leadership curriculum, team-building and personal development exercises.

== Applications ==
Any student (5th grade or older) could apply to travel on a program. All students must complete an application and an interview process before they can go on a trip to ensure that they possess the maturity and social skills needed for extended travel.

The nomination process was open to any applicant. Some parents complained in 2006 that the program's marketing made it appear that their child was exclusively selected or nominated to participate. The Iowa Attorney General investigated the program's operator in 2006 after an invitation was accidentally sent to the long-deceased child of a family. The operator modified the invitation and presentation process. In another case, a family received a People to People solicitation claiming under the name of their late family pet, that it had been selected as an ambassador.

== Controversies ==
In 2007, student ambassador Tyler Hill died of complications following his group's hike on Mount Fuji in Japan. The family sued the program and its parent company, reaching a settlement in 2009.

In 2008, People to People invested more than $3 million to support health and safety initiatives for participants. The company also hired a full-time Senior Director of Health and Safety and began a Safe Travel 24/7 blog. In 2010, People to People Ambassador Programs launched the FindMe program with Cellhire that allowed a mobile phone to be tracked using GPS or cell tower triangulation. Parents of students could also rent the FindMe phone and have text conversations with their children through the FindMe website.

In July 2011, CBS News reported that People to People had retained a for-profit marketing company, AmbassadorsGroup to solicit participants. Among their reportedly questionable tactics: solicitations to long-deceased children citing their "exceptional academic performance" as the reason for the solicitation, and the signed endorsement of a Virginia State Senator without her endorsement or knowledge.
