= ENotes =

Student and teacher educational website

eNotes
- Website type: Internet Educational Resource
- Available in: English
- Founded: 2004
- Headquarters: Seattle, Washington
- Website: www.enotes.com
- Commercial: Yes
- Current status: Active

eNotes is a student and teacher educational website founded in 2004 by Brad Satoris and Alexander Bloomingdale, that provides material to help students complete homework assignments and study for exams. Based in Seattle, Washington, eNotes specializes in lesson plans, study guides and literary criticisms. It also hosts an active homework help portal where students can ask educators academic questions. The Homework Help section has hundreds of thousands of questions with answers.

The website's material mainly focuses on literature and history, though the company offers a variety of different topics within the humanities. A network of over 1,000 teachers and professors contributes much of the content. It is different from other online subscription education services in that an in-house publishing team edits uploaded works mainly for grammar and formatting. With its subscription model, the company bootstrapped its way to profitability. It claims about 750 new sign-ups on a weekday during the school year. According to internet analytics firm Quantcast.com, the site is accessed by more than 11 million unique visitors each month, making it among the most-visited education properties in the United States.

== See also ==
- CliffsNotes
- Chegg
- SparkNotes
- Course Hero
