= Klima (application) =

Carbon-offsetting mobile application

Climate Labs GmbH
- Company type: Gesellschaft mit beschränkter Haftung
- Industry: Mobile application development
- Founded: 2019
- Founder: Markus Gilles, Jonas Brandau, Andreas Pursian-Ehrlich
- Headquarters: Berlin, Germany
- Website: https://klima.com

Klima is a carbon offsetting mobile application created by Climate Labs GmbH with headquarters in Berlin. The company was formed in 2019 and is the third to have been founded jointly by serial entrepreneurs Markus Gilles, Andreas Pursian-Ehrlich, and Jonas Brandau. Klima's mission is "to turn carbon neutrality into a mass movement and unleash the power of individual action at scale."

In 2020, Klima raised $5.8 million in a seed funding round backed by Christian Reber (co-founder and CEO of Pitch), Jens Begemann, Niklas Jansen (co-founder and managing director of Blinkist), e.ventures, HV Holtzbrinck Ventures, and 468 Capital.

The Klima app launched on the App Store and Google Store in December 2020. It is currently available worldwide on iOS and Android.

== Features ==
Klima's stated goal is to help people neutralize their carbon footprint in a simple and effective manner. To do that, the app calculates a member's annual carbon footprint by asking them 9-10 lifestyle questions, including how they eat, whether they have a car, or how often they take a flight. These factors are used to calculate the user's estimated carbon footprint.

Based on a user's carbon footprint, the app calculates a monthly subscription fee. The company keeps 30% of this fee (10% for operating costs and 20% for marketing budget), and the remaining 70% goes to carbon offsetting projects of the user's choice. Users can choose to support tree planting, solar energy, and clean cook stove projects. The app tracks the amount of greenhouse gas emissions that are offset over time, as well as shows the amount of trees planted, kilowatts of solar power enabled, and clean-cooked meals enabled by their subscription.

The app also promotes carbon footprint reduction. Users receive a personalized checklist within the app, and tips on how to reduce their emissions overall through an in-app inbox.

== Transparency and verification ==
On the Klima website, projects are described but no links to actual project websites or external sources for additional project information are available.

Klima's projects are verified by the Verified Carbon Standard, the Gold Standard developed by WWF, and the Climate, Community and Biodiversity Standards.

== Carbon offsetting controversies ==
Carbon offsetting is still a relatively new concept with unknown effectiveness and long-term impacts. Controversy around carbon offsetting primarily entails criticism due to actual and potential negative social, economic, and ecological outcomes of carbon offsetting schemes and projects.
