= Ellen Siminoff =

American entrepreneur

- Born: Ellen Friedman; 1967 (age 58–59); Milwaukee, Wisconsin, U.S.
- Education: Princeton University (BA); Stanford University (MBA)
- Occupations: Entrepreneur, Investor
- Years active: 1996–present
- Known for: Yahoo! (founding executive); Shmoop (co-founder)
- Spouse: David Siminoff (m. 1994)
- Children: 2

Ellen Siminoff (born 1967, Milwaukee, Wisconsin) is an entrepreneur, board member and investor. Frequently quoted in The New York Times as an Internet industry commentator, Siminoff was named one of Forbes magazine's Masters of Information in 2005.

Along with her husband, David Siminoff, Ellen is co-founder and former chief executive officer of Shmoop.

== Life and education ==
Siminoff obtained a BA in economics from Princeton University and an MBA from Stanford University, where she met her husband David Siminoff while they were students at the Stanford Graduate School of Business. She also has a Master of Liberal Arts in Extension Studies Software Engineering from Harvard University.

== Career ==
Siminoff is a seasoned executive in the media and technology sectors, From 2007 to 2018, she served as president and CEO of Shmoop University, an educational publishing company. Prior to this role, she was president and CEO of Efficient Frontier, a company specializing in dynamic Search Engine Marketing (SEM) management services, which was later acquired by Adobe.

=== Yahoo! ===
Siminoff was a founding executive at Yahoo!, working at the company from 1996 to 2002. She started by running corporate and business development, running mergers and acquisitions after the departure of J. J. Healy. Later Siminoff moved to Senior Vice President of Entertainment and Small Business, with Toby Coppel and Jeff Weiner taking over corporate development. Six months later, Yahoo announced on April 13, 2002, that Siminoff decided to leave the company but would stay through until the end of the year. Her departure was part of a high-profile exodus of Yahoo executives, including CEO Timothy Koogle, CFO Gary Valenzuela, sales chief Anil Singh, head of international operations Heather Killen, and marketing head Karen Edwards.

=== Efficient Frontier ===
Siminoff was former chairman and CEO of Efficient Frontier. In July 2006 Bloomberg Businessweek noted that Efficient Frontier was the largest buyer of search advertising keywords on Google, and in March 2008 Silicon Alley Insider named Efficient Frontier one of the 25 most valuable privately held companies in Silicon Valley, valued at an estimated $275 million. Adobe Inc. bought Efficient Frontier for $400 million in 2012.

=== Zynga ===
In 2012, she was appointed to Zynga Inc.'s board of directors. In November 2012, Siminoff purchased 250,000 shares of the company. She served on Zynga's board from 2012 to 2022, where she was a member of the Audit Committee and chaired the Nominating and Corporate Governance Committee.

=== Take-Two Interactive ===
Ellen Siminoff became a director of Take-Two Interactive in May 2022, following the company's merger with Zynga.

=== Other board positions ===
Siminoff has been on the board of directors for Journal Media Group, U.S. Auto Parts, Mozilla Corporation, SolarWinds, Discovery Education and Zynga.

She serves as executive chairman of BigCommerce (BIGC) and Verifone, a global payments platform, Follett Software and Take-Two Interactive (TTWO). She has also been involved with Stanford University's Graduate School of Business Advisory Board, Princeton University's President's Advisory Council, and Stanford's Hoover Institution Board of Overseers.
