= York Notes =

English literature study guide series

- Parent company: York Press/Pearson Education
- Country of origin: United Kingdom
- Headquarters location: 322 Old Brompton Road, London SW5 9JH
- Official website: www.yorknotes.com

York Notes are a series of English literature study guides sold in the United Kingdom and in approximately 100 countries worldwide.

They are sold as revision material for GCSE and A-level exams particularly as literary guides to introduce students to sophisticated analysis and perspectives of the specific title. The guides for A-level are sold under the name York Notes AS/A2, the GCSE guides under the name York Notes for GCSE with each guide attributed to its relevant author. There is also a range of York Notes Companion titles aimed at undergraduate level study.

In recent years the brand has launched York Notes Plus – a series of enhanced digital editions incorporating interactive materials.

The Irish literature academic A. Norman Jeffares edited the series. He previously worked at the University of Leeds and had moved to the University of Stirling by 1992. Numerous authors in 1992 had ties to the two universities through being lecturers or students. Books published that year earned their authors a £200 advance payment along with 5% in royalty payments. Nearly 20,000 students in 1992 purchased the Macbeth study aid from York Notes.

York Notes are an imprint of Librairie du Liban, a company based in Beirut. In the United Kingdom, Longman publishes the York Notes. By 1988, there were 300 York Notes books. By 2013, York Notes had expanded its scope beyond pre-university students to also cover instructors and undergraduate students. That year, Francis Gilbert of The Times Educational Supplement said that York Notes and Letts Revision "dominate the market".

York Handbooks are a more comprehensive resource compared to York Notes. York Handbook titles include Preparing for Examinations in English Literature, The English Novel, Studying Shakespeare, English Usage.

== Reception ==
Referring to York Notes, Hugh David of The Times Educational Supplement wrote in 1985, "it is still unfortunately possible to find one or two hack-works cobbled together apparently with no higher motive than to plug a hole in the list". He criticised the York Notes on the Selected Poems of W. H. Auden for having "a vague, prissy and rather misleading biographical introduction" and for barely addressing Auden's final 25 years. David thought Selected Poems of Byron was "better on content" but criticised it for discussing Ludwig van Beethoven and Mrs Malaprop. He praised the York Handbook Studying Shakespeare for being "a stimulating introduction".

The Financial Times writer Alan Forrest said in 1988 that the educator Michael Marland considered York Notes to be "eminently suitable" for preparing for the GCSE even though the guides were not directly targeted at GCSE candidates.

== See also ==
- BookRags
- CliffsNotes
- Coles Notes
- Shmoop
- SparkNotes
- Video study guide
