= Wordly Wise 3000 =

American series of vocabulary workbooks

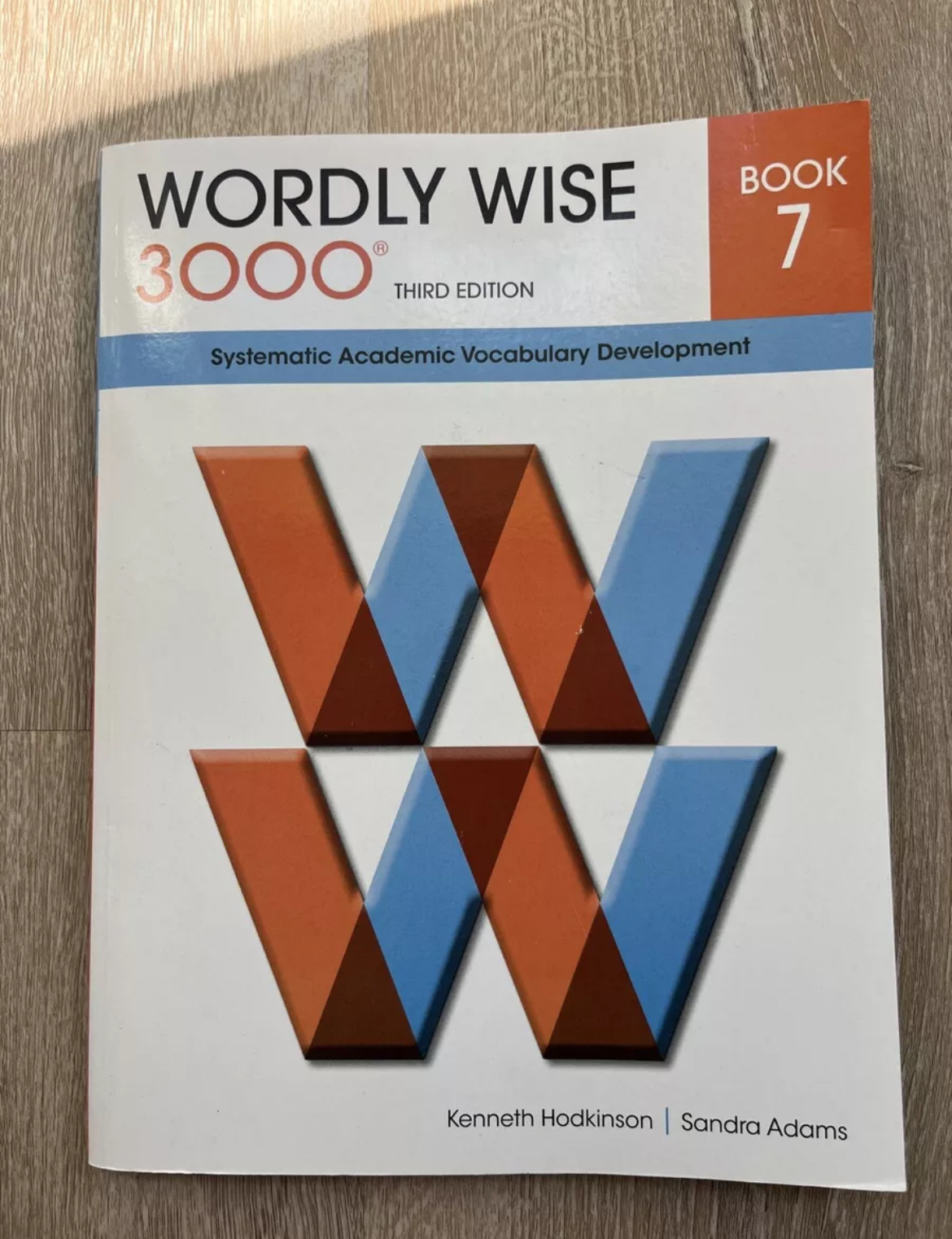
Book 7 of third edition series of Wordly Wise textbooks.

Wordly Wise 3000 is an American series of workbooks published by Educators Publishing Service for the teaching of spelling and vocabulary. Books A through C (for grades 2–4) introduce 300 words and books 1–9 (grades 4–12) 3,000 words, all with exercises. As well as spelling and meaning, the books cover the etymology and stories behind the words discussed. The series is used by home schoolers and Christian educators. In 2017 Wordly Wise partnered with Quizlet.
