= E note =

E note may refer to:

- eNote, an electronic financial instrument
- E (musical note)
- eNotes. educational software
