= Flash notes =

Flash notes may refer to:

- Counterfeit money § Money art, parodies of banknotes
- Flashnotes, online marketplace for study guides etc.
