= Reva Potashin =

Canadian psychologist (1921–2013)

- Born: September 13, 1921; Toronto, Ontario, Canada
- Died: September 15, 2013 (aged 92)
- Occupation: Professor Emeritus

Academic background
- Education: University of Toronto

Academic work
- Discipline: Psychology
- Institutions: University of British Columbia

Reva Potashin (September 13, 1921 – September 15, 2013) was a Canadian psychologist known for her contributions to the field of sociometry (the measurement of social groups). She was a professor emeritus at the University of British Columbia in Vancouver, British Columbia, Canada.

== Biography ==
The youngest of five children, Potashin was born and raised in Toronto, Ontario. Her parents were Jewish immigrant parents from Eastern Europe. She graduated from Harbord Street Collegiate Institute (now Harbord Collegiate Institute). In 1943, she earned a bachelor’s degree in psychology from the University of Toronto. Potashin continued her graduate studies in psychology at the University of Toronto, earning a master's degree in 1944 and a Ph.D. in 1951.

Potashin joined the psychology faculty at the University of British Columbia (UBC) in 1952, where she would remain until her retirement in 1986. At UBC, Potashin focused mainly on teaching, about which she was passionate.

Potashin died in Vancouver on September 15, 2013, two days after her 92nd birthday.

== Research ==
Potashin conducted a number of studies during her graduate studies that were influential in her field of sociometry, a method for measuring and describing social groups. In her master's research (later published in the journal Sociometry), Potashin compared the characteristics of students at a school who were identified as friends, versus those who were not friends. Her results demonstrated that children with close friendships tended to be generally accepted by their classmates, whereas those without friends experienced less acceptance. In the sociometric measure, children without friends tended to identify popular members of their class as their friends (who did not reciprocate their nomination). Potashin also identified two different patterns of social groups: closed cliques (where every member of a group identified every other member as a friend), comprising the most highly accepted members of the class; and a "wider spreading" type that consisted of students with average levels of peer acceptance, each of whom had friends that they did not necessarily share with their other friends.

Potashin also piloted an experimental method for comparing the interactions between friends and between non-friends. In this study, she observed children in conversation (on a specific topic selected by the experimenter), and compared various factors in their discussions, such as the overall length of the discussion and differences between partners' participation in the discussion. Compared to non-friends, friends spoke more freely (requiring less prompting from the experimenter) and for longer periods of time.

In 1947 (12 years after the "birthdate" of sociometry, as described by Jacob L. Moreno), Potashin co-authored, with Mary Louise Northway and Esther Frankel, a monograph reviewing the sociometric research conducted over the previous decade at the University of Toronto.

== Publications ==
- Frankel, E.B., & Potashin, R. (1944). A survey of sociometric and pre-sociometric literature on friendship and social acceptance. Sociometry, 7(4), 48-70. doi:10.1177/01650254221084097
- Potashin, R. (1944). A study of the social relationships of grade-school children: friends and nonfriends. Bulletin of the Canadian Psychological Association, 4, 57-58. doi:10.1037/dev0001359
- Potashin, R. (1946). A sociometric study of children's friendships. Sociometry, 9(1), 48-70. doi:10.2307/2785510
- Northway, M.L., and Potashin, R. (1946). Mental hygiene test. Sociometry, 9(1). doi:10.4135/9781506326139.n644
- Northway, M.L., Frankel, E.B., & Potashin, R. (1947). Personality and sociometric status. New York: Beacon House. doi:10.2307/2785009
