= Collectors Weekly =

Website

- Available in: English
- Owner: Barnebys.com
- Website: www.collectorsweekly.com
- Commercial: Yes
- Launched: 2007

Collectors Weekly is an online resource for people interested in antiques, collectibles, and vintage items. The site pairs live auctions with original content, which ranges from encyclopedic essays to multi-sourced articles that aim to illuminate the cultural history of objects.

== History ==
Founded in 2007 by San Francisco-based antique-telephone collector Dave Margulius, the site has since grown into a directory of more than 1,800 different types of objects people like to collect—from action figures to Zippo lighters. Until 2011, Collectors Weekly shared staff and financial resources with the Quizlet website. In 2017, Collectors Weekly was purchased by Barnebys.com. Its staff of three writers and editors share an office in The Grotto in San Francisco.

== Overview ==
Collectors Weekly uses a number of factors to determine how much a collectible is worth, the primary ones being the item's condition, authenticity, rarity, current market demand, and value. Collectors Weekly has three main areas of focus—its category pages, a community known as Show & Tell, and hundreds of long-form articles and interviews, which are presented contextually across the site. Each of its category pages features a written description known as an Overview accompanied by a selection of filtered eBay auctions, which can be sorted by highest bid, the number of people on eBay watching the item, or the time left in the auction. Users can also see about a month's worth of completed auctions in any category. The site's "Show & Tell" section allows registered users to showcase items they collect, as well as to get feedback on their pieces from other collectors. Finally, Collectors Weekly writers publish articles that often delve into the technological and social histories of objects. Some of these articles are presented as long-form interviews with antiques experts, while others are shorter, photo-driven, blog-style posts. Recent examples include articles on the history of Hawaiian hula girls, a 1960s rock band called the Charlatans, and the 16th-century practice of using applied beauty marks to cover facial blemishes.
