= Murray R. Spiegel =

American mathematician

- Born: Murray Ralph Spiegel; October 20, 1923; Brooklyn, New York City
- Died: April 28, 1991 (aged 67); East Hartford, Connecticut
- Education: Cornell University
- Occupations: Author, mathematician

Murray Ralph Spiegel (October 20, 1923 – April 28, 1991) was an author of textbooks on mathematics, including titles in a collection of Schaum's Outlines.

Spiegel was a native of Brooklyn and a graduate of New Utrecht High School. He received his bachelor's degree in mathematics and physics from Brooklyn College in 1943. He earned a master's degree in 1947 and doctorate in 1949, both in mathematics and both at Cornell University. His PhD dissertation, supervised by Marc Kac, was titled On the Random Vibrations of Harmonically Bound Particles in a Viscous Medium.

He was a teaching fellow at Harvard University in 1943–1945, a consultant with Monsanto Chemical Company in the summer of 1946, and a teaching fellow at Cornell University from 1946 to 1949. He was a consultant in geophysics for Beers & Heroy in 1950, and a consultant in aerodynamics for Wright Air Development Center from 1950 to 1954.

Spiegel joined the faculty of Rensselaer Polytechnic Institute in 1949 as an assistant professor. He became an associate professor in 1954 and a full professor in 1957. He was assigned to the faculty Rensselaer Polytechnic Institute of Hartford, CT, when that branch was organized in 1955, where he served as chair of the mathematics department.

== Works ==
- Schaum's Outline of College Algebra (First Edition: 1956) [Most Recent Edition: 2018]
- Schaum's Outline of College Physics
- Schaum's Outline of Statistics (FE: 1961) [MRE: 2018]
- Schaum's Outline of Advanced Calculus (1963) [2010]
- Schaum's Outline of Complex Variables (1964) [2009]
- Schaum's Outline of Laplace Transforms (1965)
- Schaum's Mathematical Handbook of Formulas and Tables (1968) [2008]
- Schaum's Outline of Vector Analysis [And An Introduction to Tensor Analysis] (1968) [2009]
- Schaum's Outline of Real Variables (1969)
- Schaum's Outline of Advanced Mathematics for Engineers and Scientists (1971) [2009]
- Schaum's Outline of Finite Differences and Difference Equations (1971)
- Schaum's Outline of Fourier Analysis with Applications to Boundary-Value Problems (1974)
- Schaum's Outline of Probability and Statistics (1975) [2013]
- Schaum's Outline of Theoretical Mechanics (1967)
- Applied Differential Equations (1963) [1980]
