= Seymour Lipschutz =

American mathematician

Seymour Saul Lipschutz (born 1931 died March 2018) was an author of technical books on pure mathematics and probability, including a collection of Schaum's Outlines.

Lipschutz received his Ph.D. in 1960 from New York University's Courant Institute. He received his BA and MA degrees in Mathematics at Brooklyn College. He was a mathematics professor at Temple University, and before that on the faculty at the Polytechnic Institute of Brooklyn.

== Bibliography ==
- Schaum's Outline of Discrete Mathematics
- Schaum's Outline of Probability
- Schaum's Outline of Finite Mathematics
- Schaum's Outline of Linear Algebra
- Schaum's Outline of Beginning Linear Algebra
- Schaum's Outline of Set Theory
- Schaum's Outline of General Topology
- Schaum's Outline of Data Structures
- Schaum's Outline of Differential Geometry
