= Coles Notes =

Canadian student guides to literature

Coles Notes are student guides to literature, published in Canada. The Coles bookstore first published Coles Notes in 1948. The first title was on the French novella Colomba by Prosper Mérimée.

In 1958, Jack and Carl Cole, founders of Coles, sold the U.S. rights to Coles Notes to Cliff Hillegass, who then published the books under CliffsNotes. Coles Notes is currently owned by Indigo Books in Canada.

== See also ==
- BookRags
- Shmoop
- SparkNotes
- York Notes
