= Clifton Hillegass =

Creator and publisher of CliffsNotes

Clifton K. Hillegass (18 April 1918 – 5 May 2001) was the creator and publisher of CliffsNotes.

== Biography ==
Clifton Hillegass was born in Rising City, Nebraska, graduated from Midland Lutheran College and then studied physics and geology for two years at the University of Nebraska. He later received four honorary degrees.

CliffsNotes began in 1958 as $1 reprints of Canadian 'Coles Notes' study guides for 16 plays by Shakespeare. At that time, Hillegass worked for a major distributor of college textbooks. He knew hundreds of campus bookstore managers across the country. Those close relationships gave him the first outlets for the Notes. Sales expanded rapidly as high school students began to buy the slim yellow and black pamphlets. By the early 1970s the company had created additional study aids—exam reviews, course outlines, law school materials, and test preparation kits for the SAT, ACT, GRE, and GMAT.

As the company grew, Hillegass kept its headquarters in Lincoln, Nebraska, where he died. Each year he donated 10 percent of the pre-tax profits to local charities and civic organizations (which, on his death, received half of his estate). Most employees were lifetime Lincoln residents. After he sold the company in 1999, Hillegass endowed a chair in English at the University of Nebraska–Lincoln.
