= CliffsNotes =

Student study guides

CliffsNotes for Romeo and Juliet

CliffsNotes are a series of student study guides. The guides present and create literary and other works in pamphlet form or online. Detractors of the study guides claim they let students bypass reading the assigned literature. The company claims to promote the reading of the original work and does not view the study guides as a substitute for that reading.

== History ==
CliffsNotes was started by Nebraska native Clifton Hillegass in 1958. He was working at Nebraska Book Company of Lincoln, Nebraska, when he met Jack Cole, the co-owner of Coles, a Toronto book business. Coles published a series of Canadian study guides called Coles Notes, and sold Hillegass the U.S. rights to the guides.

Hillegass and his wife, Catherine, started the business in their basement at 511 Eastridge Drive in Lincoln, with sixteen William Shakespeare titles. In August 1958, they shipped their first batch of notes and by the end of that year had sold over 58,000 copies. Hillegass hired literature teachers to condense works of literature into concise summaries, commentaries, author biographies and character analyses. In the 1960s, as his own writers revised the summaries of Shakespearian plays, Hillegass eliminated the Coles Notes versions. Hillegass had the books printed in Lincoln by a local printer, Boomer's Printing, owned by Hillegass' friend, Lowell Boomer. Up until their sale in 1998, all Cliffs Notes were printed here.

IDG Books purchased CliffsNotes in 1998 for $14.2 million. John Wiley & Sons acquired IDG Books (renamed Hungry Minds) in 2001. In 2011, CliffsNotes announced a joint venture with Mark Burnett, a TV producer, to create a series of 60-second video study guides of literary works. In 2012, CliffsNotes was acquired by Houghton Mifflin Harcourt. In 2021, CliffsNotes was acquired by Course Hero.

== See also ==
- 60second Recap
- BookRags
- Coles Notes
- Enotes
- Letts and Lonsdale
- Masterplots
- Schaum's Outlines
- Shmoop
- SparkNotes
- York Notes
