= Symbolab =

Mathematical question-answering engine

- Website type: Answer engine
- Available in: 13 languages
- Headquarters: Redwood City, California, {{{location_country}}}
- Country of origin: Israel
- Owners: Learneo, Inc.
- Website: www.symbolab.com
- Commercial: Yes
- Registration: Optional
- Launched: 2011
- Current status: Active

Symbolab is an answer engine that provides step-by-step solutions to mathematical problems in a range of subjects. It was originally developed by Israeli start-up company EqsQuest Ltd., under whom it was released for public use in 2011. In 2020, the company was acquired by American educational technology website Course Hero.

== History ==
In late 2011, Symbolab was released as a mathematical semantic search engine by Israeli entrepreneurs Michal Avny (CEO), Adam Arnon (Chief Scientist), and Lev Alyshayev (CTO). At the onset, it could interpret a user-entered equation or symbolic problem and find the solution if it existed. Later, the ability to show all of the steps explaining the calculation were added.

The company's emphasis gradually drifted towards focusing on providing step-by-step solutions for mathematical problems at the secondary and post-secondary levels. Symbolab relies on machine learning algorithms for both the search and solution aspects of the engine.

== Acquisition in 2020 ==
In October 2020, California-based Course Hero acquired EqsQuest Ltd. and the Symbolab engine for an undisclosed amount. The former employees, all based in Tel Aviv, joined the Course Hero team as part of the acquisition.

== See also ==
- Science and technology in Israel
  - Silicon Wadi
- Science and technology in the United States
  - Silicon Valley
