= World's Biggest Bookstore =

Bookstore in Toronto, Canada

Coordinates: 43.657008°N 79.382355°W

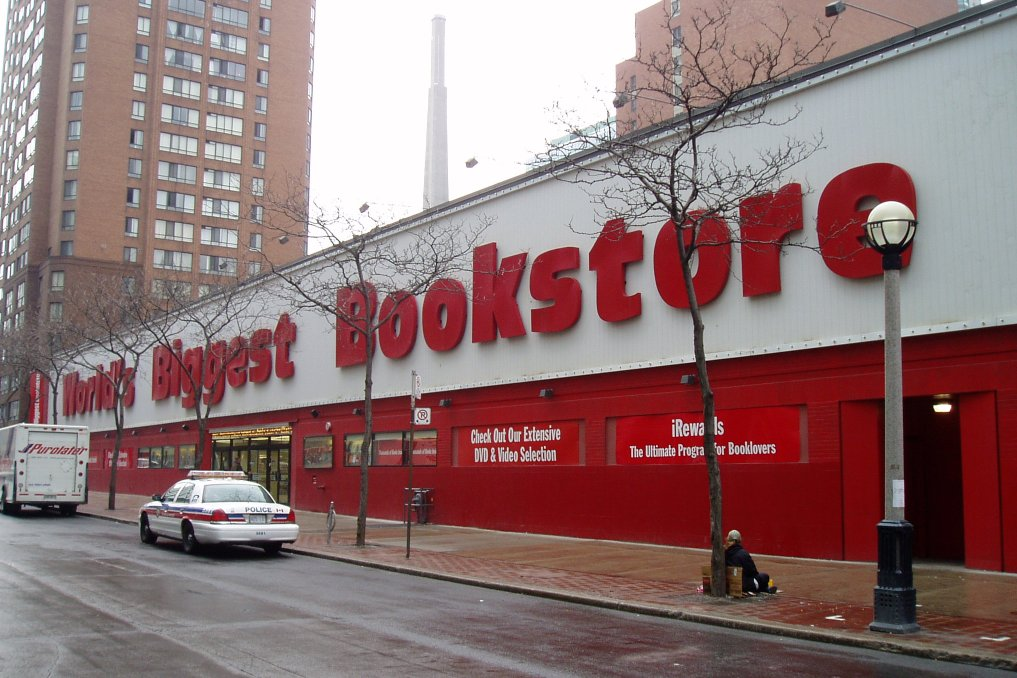
- Type: Subsidiary
- Industry: Books
- Founded: November 1980; 45 years ago
- Founder: Carl and Jack Cole
- Defunct: March 30, 2014; 12 years ago
- Headquarters: Toronto, Ontario, Canada

The World's Biggest Bookstore was a bookstore in Toronto, Ontario, Canada, at 20 Edward St, just north of the Toronto Eaton Centre and the Atrium on Bay. Operating from 1980 until 2014, the three-storey store covered 64,000 square feet and was noted for its bright lights and over 20 kilometres of bookshelves.

== History ==
The store was founded by Jack Cole and Carl Cole, the former owners of Coles Bookstore.

At the time of its opening in November 1980, in a converted building that had housed the Olympia bowling alley, it was unchallenged in its claim as the biggest bookstore in the world. Although it retained the name, the Guinness Book of World Records listed the Barnes & Noble College Booksellers location on Fifth Avenue in New York City as the largest bookstore in the world based on floor space, although Powell's Books of Portland, Oregon, is usually considered the largest based on shelf-space. Nevertheless, World's Biggest Bookstore claimed the title on the basis that it carried the most titles. The Barnes & Noble location closed in early 2014. On December 22, 2010, Maruzen and Junkodou Shoten opened a 73,000 square foot (6804 m^{2}) bookstore in the Umeda district of Osaka, Japan, overtaking these other three in terms of floor space.

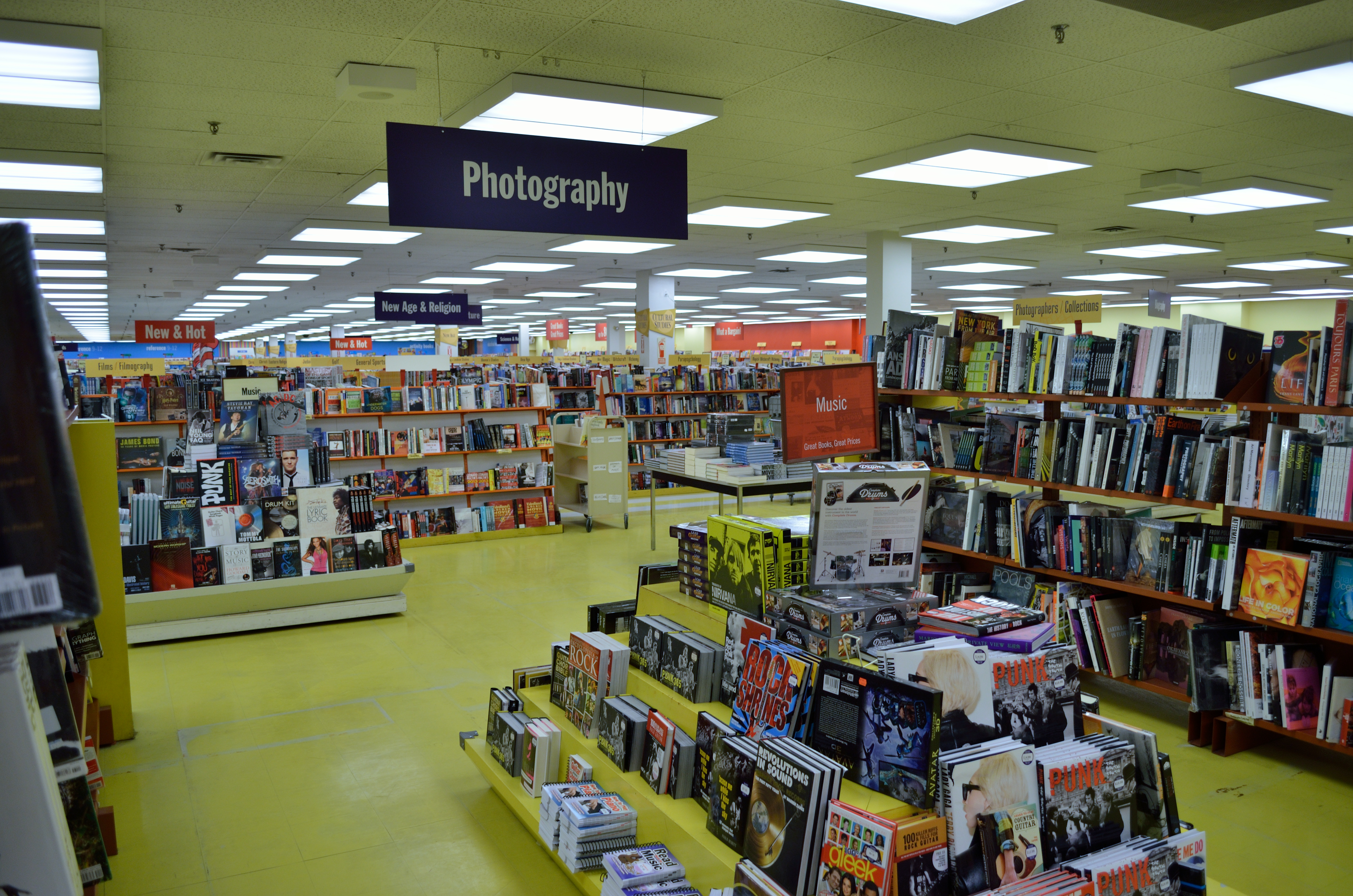
Interior

The store made a brief appearance in the movie Short Circuit 2 when the main character, a robot named Johnny 5, enters the store and creates chaos as he reads through the books.

On June 20, 2012, it was reported that the lease on the store's building, set to expire at the end of 2013, would not be renewed, and the store would close.

In November 2013 it was announced that the property at 20 Edward Street had been sold to Lifetime Developments, and the store would close in mid-February and vacate the building by April. In February 2014, a press release by Paracom Realty Corporation stated that the site would be redeveloped and leased to four restaurants designed by Turner Fleisher Architects. The closure date was revised to the end of March 2014. The bookstore closed for the last time on March 30, 2014. The structure was demolished in November 2014. The site was developed as Panda Condominiums with leasing for retail and office spaces.

== Advertising ==
In the late 1990s, with customers' book shopping habits radically changing after the launch of Chapters and Indigo, the store chose to play up its "no frills" image with an advertising campaign that included the following slogans:

- "We occasionally have soft mood lighting. But then we replaced the burnt out fluorescent tubes."
- "Like other bookstores, we have places to sit. But why aggravate your hemorrhoids?"
- "Books priced so low even people who don't read too good is buying them."

These self-deprecating slogans are in the style of Toronto's landmark bargain store, Honest Ed's.
