= Coles (bookstore) =

Canadian bookstore chain

Coles Book Stores Ltd.
- Type: Subsidiary
- Industry: Retail
- Founded: 1940; 86 years ago in Toronto, Ontario, Canada
- Founders: Jack Cole; Carl Cole
- Headquarters: Canada
- Number of locations: 63 (Coles); 17 (IndigoSpirit)
- Area served: most of Canada
- Products: Books
- Parent: Indigo Books and Music
- Subsidiaries: Coles Notes; World's Biggest Bookstore

Coles Book Stores Ltd. is a Canadian bookstore chain owned by Indigo Books and Music. Coles is Indigo's brand for small-scale bookstores in locations such as shopping malls. Some locations are operated as SmithBooks, and the company has also opened selected small-format locations as "IndigoSpirit".

== History ==
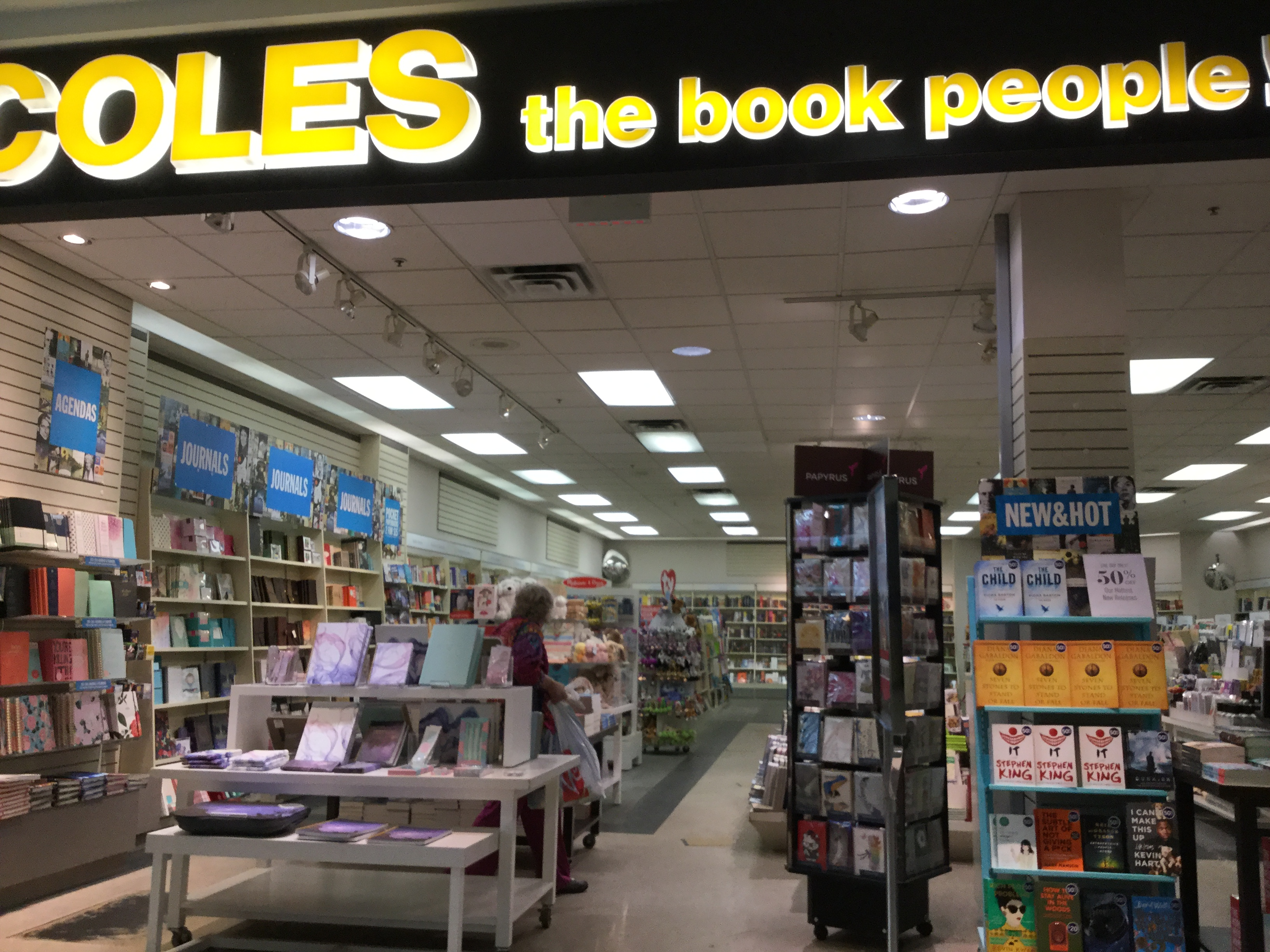
A now-closed old-style Coles store at Bonnie Doon Shopping Centre in 2017

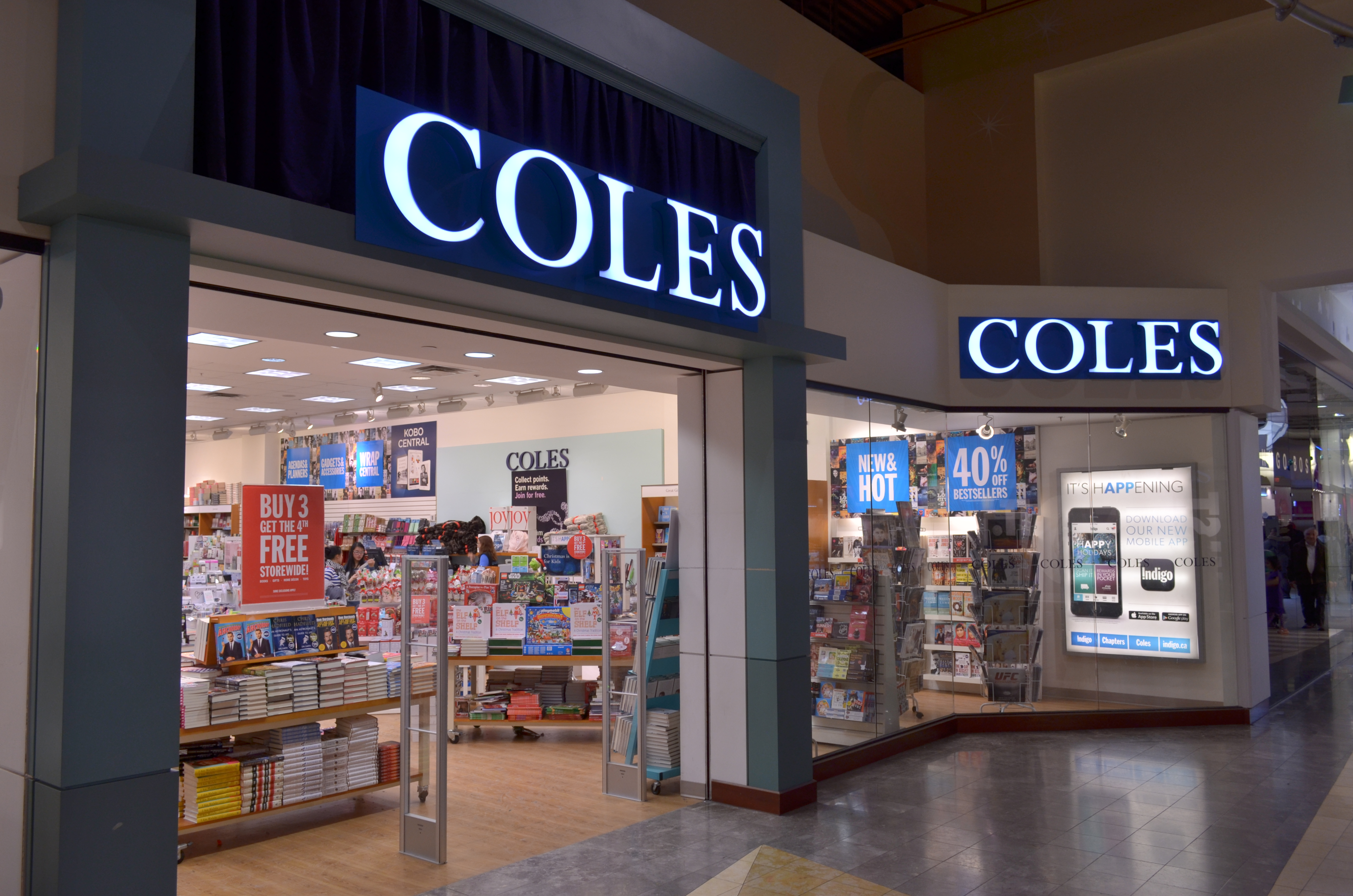
A Coles store in Vaughan Mills in November 2013

In 1940, two brothers, Carl Cole and Jack Cole, opened their first bookstore in Toronto, near the University of Toronto on Bloor Street near Spadina Avenue. Prior to opening the store, they had operated a "pushcart", buying up textbooks at the end of the school year and reselling them in the fall.

At the age of 11, the Coles were living in foster homes in Detroit and eventually Toronto. With the little amount of money they had, they were able to open their first store (paying rent daily as they could not afford the monthly rent payments). With no retail experience, the Cole brothers turned their store into what was once Canada's largest bookstore chain.

Jack and Carl Cole are also responsible for inventing Coles Notes. Coles Notes began when students at a local high school were having trouble translating a French paper. Jack and Carl hired someone to translate the book and sold over 1,000 copies. The original Coles Notes were typed up by Mrs. Alcorn, and produced by mimeograph machine. (Mrs. Alcorn stayed with Coles Bookstores as long as it remained in the hands of the Coles brothers.) Coles Notes have sold over 80,000,000 copies worldwide, and served as the foundation for the similar Cliffs Notes which are published in the U.S.

Jack Cole was an avid collector of Canadian books. In the late 1960s, he started reprinting affordable, paperbound facsimile editions of scarce and rare Canadian history titles, such as George M. Grant's Ocean to Ocean: Sandford Fleming's expedition through Canada in 1872. Previous to the Cole's edition a history buff or student either had to pay a premium for the original edition if it could be found, have access to the rare book collection at a major library, or buy an expensive limited-edition reprint from a historical society or university press.

Not missing a trick, the Coles established ownership of critical trade names by establishing and registering their use in Canada. They published books under the banner of Waldenbooks, so when K-Mart wanted to introduce their captive book chain into Canada, they found that "Waldenbooks" was already registered and in use. K-Mart was free to set up bookstores, just not Waldenbooks. They followed a similar ploy by having stores do business under the "Borders" name, as a blocking move.

In addition to the flagship brand, known for many years as "Coles - the Book People!", the company operated the self-proclaimed World's Biggest Bookstore in downtown Toronto, as well as two other bookstore banners, Active Minds and The Book Company.

In 1978, Jack and Carl sold Coles to Southam Inc. In April 1995, Southam resold the company to Pathfinder Capital, which had acquired Coles' main rival, SmithBooks, one year earlier. That chain consisted of the Canadian former operations of British bookstore chain W H Smith (1950-1989), which had first been sold to Canadian owners in 1989.

The merged company, Chapters Inc., opened Canada's first two book superstores under the "Chapters" brand in November 1995. The smaller-format bookstores retained their existing names, but over time many of these locations have been converted to the Coles banner. A handful of SmithBooks stores continue to operate as of late 2008, but even in these cases staff uniforms and shopping bags bear the "Coles" name.

Indigo purchased Chapters, and in turn Coles, in 2001. A number of Coles locations continue to operate in Canada as of 2013, primarily in suburban shopping malls. However, many have been closed in recent years, especially if located in close proximity to an Indigo or Chapters location; other locations have been converted into IndigoSpirit stores.

== Expansion into the United States ==
After dominating the Canadian book market by the early 1970s, Coles found little opportunity for further growth within Canada and Jack Coles decided to explore further expansion south of the border by opening new "Coles - the Book People!" stores in the rapidly expanding United States market.

The first store in the United States was opened in Buffalo, New York, in 1973. By 1980, there were 56 stores in the United States with more being opened. In 1987, Southam decided to sell or close the U.S. stores since the stores were not generating enough profit. A few months later 52 U.S. stores were sold to Kmart and were converted into Waldenbooks stores.
