= Masterplots =

Reference book series

- 1954-1962 Masterplots
- Author: Frank N. Magill
- Language: English
- Subject: Literature
- Genre: reference book
- Publisher: Salem Press
- Publication date: 1949
- Publication place: United States

Masterplots is a reference book series which summarizes the plots of significant works of literature and films. The first edition was published in 1949 by Frank N. Magill of Salem Press. As of 2020, the current version is the fourth edition, published in 2011.

The series offers 12,000 reference articles focusing on plot summaries, critical commentary, character profiles, literary settings and biographical profiles. In addition to the complete Fourth Edition, volumes are available on African American Literature, American Fiction Series, British & Commonwealth Fiction, Christian Literature, Drama, Juvenile & Young Adult Literature, Nonfiction, Poetry, Short Stories, and Women's Literature.
