= Shopsy's =

Jewish delicatessen restaurant chain in Canada

Coordinates: 43.65114°N 79.38438°W

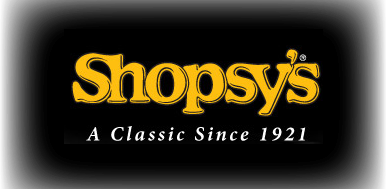
- Company type: Private
- Industry: Restaurants
- Founded: 1921; 105 years ago
- Founders: Harry and Jenny Shopsowitz
- Headquarters: Toronto, Canada
- Key people: Sam and Izzy Shopsowitz
- Products: Assorted Deli Meats
- Website: https://shopsys.ca/

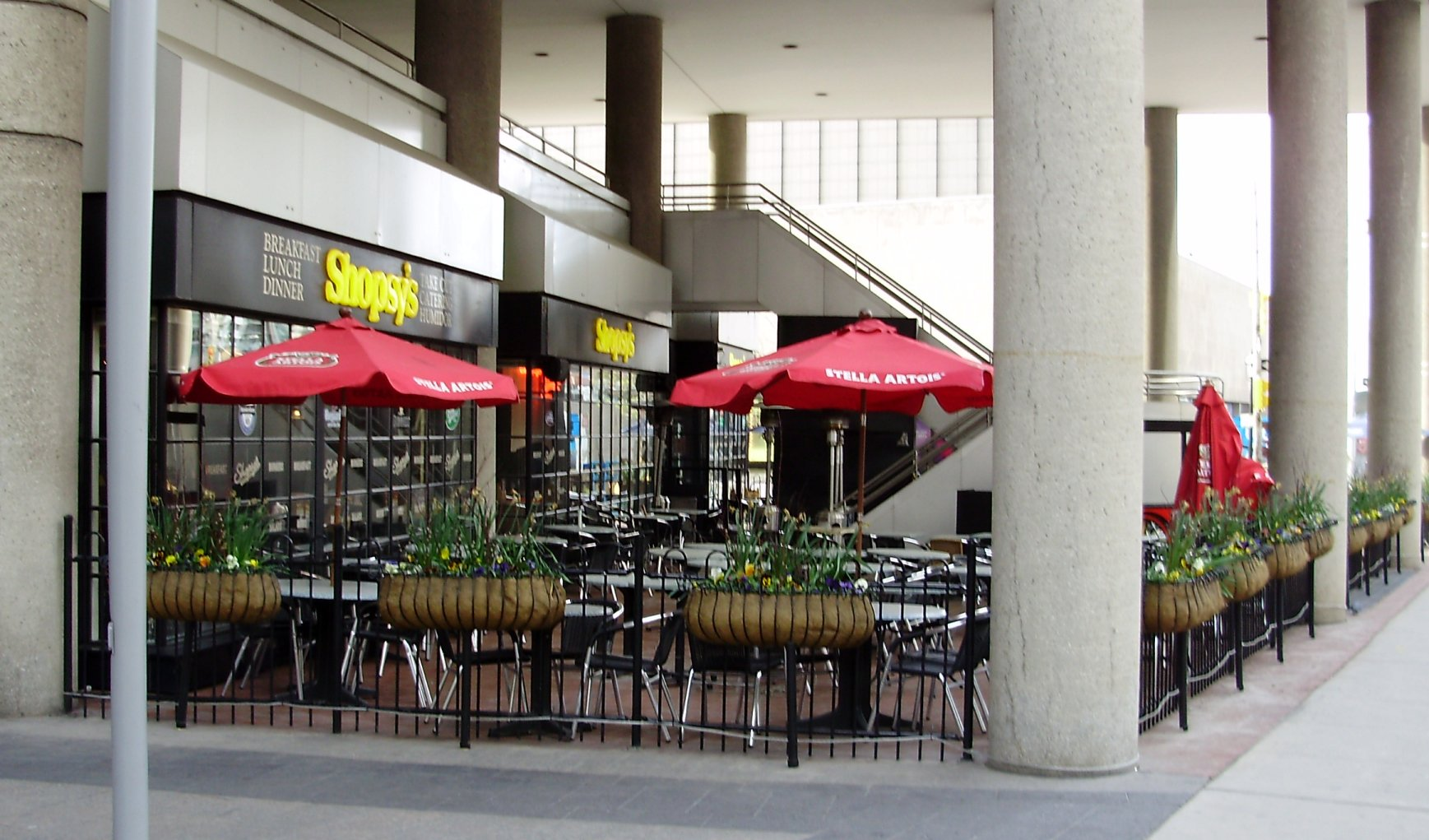
Shopsy's at Yonge and Front Streets in downtown Toronto in May 2008. The restaurant at this location has since been closed.

Shopsy's is a Jewish delicatessen restaurant chain in the Greater Toronto Area and a brand name owned by Maple Leaf Foods for a line of meat products. Originally a deli in the former Toronto Jewish area on Spadina Avenue from 1921 to 1983, it moved to Toronto's entertainment and business districts on Yonge and Front Streets in 1983. In the late 1940s, the business expanded into the production of deli meat products for both the home and business markets. Today, the main Deli is located at Toronto's Sheraton Centre and Maple Leaf Foods continue to sell Shopsy's branded hot dogs.

== History ==
In 1921, the husband-and-wife team of Harry and Jenny Shopsowitz opened an 18-seat ice cream parlour at 295 Spadina Avenue at Dundas Street West in Toronto. It became Shopsowitz Delicatessen and by the mid-1940s was selling products under the Shopsy's brand name.

Harry died in October 1945 and the business was passed along to his sons, Sam and Izzy Shopsowitz. They led its growth into a Toronto institution, renaming the business Shopsy's. Future Toronto Maple Leafs owner Harold Ballard is said to have been the person who encouraged Sam to open a meat-processing plant. By 1947, Sam was being billed as "the corned beef king" in advertisements.

Izzy sold his share of the business to Sam in 1969. Then, Lever Brothers (part of Unilever) bought the company in 1971 and Sam remained president of the company until 1977. While visiting New York City in 1982, Sam suffered a stroke from which he never fully recovered. He died in Toronto on September 13, 1984 at age 65. Izzy had rejoined the business after the sale to Unilever. He died on April 22, 1994 at age 71 after having a heart attack while greeting customers in the Shopsy's restaurant on Yonge Street.

After 62 years on Spadina, the restaurant moved to Yonge Street at Front Street in late March 1983. The Front Street location has been described as a "landmark for more than 25 years." In 2008, the lease at Yonge and Front was not renewed by the landlord and Shopsy's closed. It moved to the Sheraton Centre on Queen Street West, where it is located to this day. Previous locations also include Markham, Ontario, Toronto Island, and a Shopsy's Express Kiosk at the Rogers Centre.

In 1992, Unilever sold the manufacturing division to Maple Leaf Foods. The restaurant business—Shopsy's Hospitality Incorporated—was managed by A&W for a period in the 1990s, and then bought in 1996 by a group headed by Lewis Allen. He was CEO until leaving in 2003. In 2004, Shopsy's Hospitality was owned by Dynamic Funds.

In 2006, Irish Embassy Hospitality Group bought Shopsy's restaurant. Shopsy's Deli corporate offices are located at 51 Yonge Street (and Wellington Street East), just north of Irish Embassy Pub & Grill.

== Meat products ==
- Hot dogs
- Corned beef
- Salami
- Pastrami
- Pastrami Sticks / Jerky
- Smoked meat

== Delicatessen ==
Previous locations:

- Downtown Toronto, 96 Richmond West, Toronto (in the Sheraton Centre)
- Shopsy's York Lanes Mall, York University, 4700 Keele Street, Toronto - Sold to TIMBERS LODGE SOCIAL GRILL
- Spadina Avenue at Dundas Street West (1921–1983) – general goods store
- Yonge Street north of St. Clair Avenue (1998–2005) – now a pub
- King Street West at John Street, Toronto (1994–2003) – sold to Dunn's Famous (now closed)
- Yonge Street at Front Street, Toronto (1983–2009) – lease expired by court ruling
- Mississauga Road and Derry Road, Mississauga (2004–2010) – lease expired
- Shopsy's Express at the Rogers Centre
- Shopsy's Deli Woodbine and Steeles
- Shopsy's Centre Island – Toronto Islands
- Shopsy's Sports Bar on the Danforth

== See also ==
- List of Ashkenazi Jewish restaurants
- List of delicatessens
