= Nebraska Book Company =

American corporation

- Industry: Course material and retail software management
- Founded: 1915; 111 years ago
- Founder: E.H. Long
- Defunct: March 1, 2023
- Fate: Closed
- Headquarters: Lincoln, Nebraska, U.S.
- Key people: Gary Shapiro CEO
- Website: nebook.com

Nebraska Book Company, was a wholly owned subsidiary of Nebraska Book Holdings, Inc. (NBH), which also includes PrismRBS, Campus Store Design, and Campus Advisory Services. NBC was Founded in 1915 with a single college store near the University of Nebraska campus by E.H. "Red" Long, and it is still headquartered in Lincoln, Nebraska. Following World War II, when the supply of new textbooks could not meet the demand created by returning ex-GI students, NBC began buying books back from students at the end of the term and reselling them as used, helping to develop a used textbook industry. NBC provides wholesale textbook distribution, retail technology and consulting services to approximately 2,500 bookstores.

In 2010 the company rebranded its retail operations as Neebo. Neebo.com was the company's online portal, offering college textbooks, textbook rentals, e-textbooks, and college-branded merchandise. The company emerged from bankruptcy in 2012. Follett acquired Neebo in 2015. Nebraska Book Company retained its wholesale textbook distribution and technology businesses. In 2018, Nebraska Book Company and Follett formed a strategic partnership for course material sourcing and distribution.

NBC and the Collegiate Retail Alliance (owner of Ratex Business Solutions) merged their technology businesses in 2018. The merger introduced PrismRBS (Prism Retail Business Solutions), a technology and software provider for campus-wide retail services.

Also in 2018, NBC launched Campus Advisory Services (CAS). CAS is a consulting service which provides college retailers with recommendations to optimize their business.

Campus Store Design (previously College Store Design) provides architectural and design consulting services.

In 2020 NBC invested in the launch of ilumIA, a cloud-based software that uses data aggregation and reporting for higher education institutions and bookstores.

In May, 2022, NBC sold off Prism/RBS, which is now a part of the Harris Operating Group of Constellation Software Inc.

On February 28 2023, Nebraska Book Company announced that it would be going out of business due to struggles related to the pandemic.
