= Bloor =

- Pronunciation: /blɔːr/, US also /bloʊr/
- Language: English

Origin
- Origin: Blore (Staffordshire)

Bloor is a surname. Notable people with the surname include:

- Joseph Bloor (1789–1862), a developer of Toronto and founder of the village of Yorkville
  - Bloor Street, a major thoroughfare in Toronto named after him
    - Bloor or Line 2 Bloor–Danforth of the Toronto subway
    - Bloor, Yonge, or Bloor-Yonge station on the Toronto subway
    - Bloor streetcar line, a former line on the Toronto streetcar system
    - Bloor GO Station, a commuter rail station in Toronto
    - Bloor or Prince Edward Viaduct, Toronto
    - Bloor Cinema, Toronto
    - Bloor Collegiate Institute, Toronto
- Alan Bloor (born 1943), British footballer
- Alanah Bloor (born 1999), British actress
- Amanda Bloor (born 1962), British Anglican priest
- David Bloor (born 1942), scholar in the sociology of scientific knowledge
- Edward Bloor (born 1950), American novelist
- Ella Reeve Bloor (1862–1951), political activist
- John Bloor (born 1943), British housebuilder and owner of the Triumph company
- James Bloor (actor), British actor
- Lewis Bloor (born 1989), British reality TV participant
- Micky Bloor, British footballer

Fictional characters:

- Manfred Bloor, a character in Jenny Nimmo's Children of the Red King fantasy novel series

== See also ==
- Bloor Passage, a water passage in the Argentine Islands near Antarctica
- Ron Bloore, Canadian artist
