= Follett Corporation =

American technology company

- Type: Private
- Industry: Software; E-commerce; Retail; Bookselling
- Founded: 1873; 153 years ago
- Founder: C. W. Follett; Charles M. Barnes; John Wilcox
- Headquarters: Westchester, Illinois, United States
- Area served: Worldwide
- Key people: Emmanuel Kolady (CEO); Ryan Petersen (President)
- Revenue: ▲US$2.8 billion (2022)
- Number of employees: 4,000
- Website: follett.com

Follett Corporation is an American technology company headquartered in Westchester, Illinois. Follett is a provider of educational services and products to colleges, schools, and libraries.

== History ==
Follett Corporation was founded in 1873 when Charles M. Barnes opened a used book store in his Wheaton, Illinois, home. Three years later, Barnes moved his business, now named C. M. Barnes & Company, to Chicago where he opened a store at 23 LaSalle Street. Here, he sold new and used textbooks, stationery and school supplies.

Charles Wolcott Follett (1883–1952) joined the company in 1901 as a stock clerk. The following year, Charles Barnes retired and his son, William, became president. The company had now evolved into a wholesaler, selling used books throughout the Midwest and as far away as the Oklahoma Territory.

In 1908, the company was reorganized as C. M. Barnes–Wilcox Company when John Wilcox, William Barnes' father-in-law, became the company's primary shareholder. Four years later, in 1912, C. W. Follett became vice president and a shareholder of the company. In 1917, William Barnes sold his remaining interest in the company to John Wilcox. Later that year, Barnes moved to New York where he partnered with G. Clifford Noble and founded Barnes & Noble.

The following year, with Wilcox nearing retirement, C. W. Follett took over management of the company and it was once again renamed, this time as J. W. Wilcox & Follett Company.

John Wilcox died in 1923 and the following year, C. W. Follett and his wife, Edythe, purchased the company. During the next two years, C. W. Follett's three oldest sons—Robert Duncan (Bob), Garth and Dwight—joined the family business. C. W.'s youngest son, Laddie, who was still in grade school, joined the company in 1930.

In 1925, Dwight Follett founded the Follett Publishing Company. In 1930, R. D. Follett founded the Follett College Book Company and began wholesaling used textbooks to professors and college bookstores. The following year, R. D. established the company's first retail bookstore on a college campus outside of Chicago, and in 1940, Garth Follett created Follett Library Book Company.

=== 1950–2000 ===
In 1950, the Charles W. Follett Award was established as an annual award for children's books. The award was established by the four sons of Charles W. Follett.

Laddie Follett ran the company's original business – Wilcox & Follett – from 1952 until 1986. When C. W. Follett died in 1952, Dwight Follett succeeded his father as chairman. The company continued to grow and was renamed Follett Corporation in 1957, which it is still known by today.

Many independent second-hand book stores, who bought and sold college textbooks, as part of their inventory, used the famous "Follett Blue Book" to determine the purchase price of text books. Follett then came in - at least once a year - and purchased texts that were listed in the Blue Book.

In the mid-1970s, Dwight began to prepare for his retirement and Dick Litzsinger, R. D. Follett's son-in-law, was elected president and chief executive officer. In 1979, Dwight retired and Robert J. R. Follett was named chairman. Follett Publishing sold its trade publications in 1979 to New Century Publishing; the remainder of Follett Publishing was sold to Esquire Inc.

In 1994, Robert J. R. Follett retired and Dick Traut, R. D.'s son-in-law, was elected chairman. The following year, Loyola University Chicago named Follett Illinois Family Business of the Year. Dick Litzsinger retired as president and chief executive officer in 1997, and Ken Hull was elected president. Ken was the first non-family member to be elected president of the corporation. In 1997, Follett also restructured its board of directors, adding three non-family members. That same year, it joined Internet Systems in forming Library Systems & Services, a joint venture that provides library management services to public, academic and corporate libraries across the country. In addition, Follett purchased Book Wholesalers (BWI) – a distributor of children's books to public libraries. In 1998, to strengthen the company's ability to meet the needs of its customers, Follett aligned its various business units under three market groups – Higher Education, Elementary and High Schools and Libraries.

Dick Traut retired as chairman in 1999, and Ken Hull became chairman and chief executive officer of the corporation. In addition, in 1999, Follett launched the www.efollett.com web site.

=== 2000–present ===
In 2000, Christopher Traut was elected president and chief executive officer of Follett Corporation. Ken Hull remained as chairman of Follett Corporation. In addition, Follett's three core market groups were combined to form Follett Higher Education Group and Follett Library and School Group. In April 2001, Ken Hull retired and Mark Litzsinger was elected chairman of Follett Corporation.

Following a rigorous analysis of the company's portfolio of business units, Follett merged Follett Media Distribution, which provided audio visual products to school and public libraries, into BWI in an effort to provide its library customers with one-stop shopping for all of their book and media needs. In addition, in June 2003, Follett sold its interest in Library Systems & Services (LSSI).

In 2010, Chris Traut retired. Charles R. (Chuck) Follett took over the company as president and CEO after holding a wide range of leadership roles during his 37 years with the company. That same year, Follett was ranked #155 in Forbes' list of largest private companies. In 2011, the Follett School and Library Group was created to serve the K–12 market under one business group. Strategic business decisions were made to move the focus of the school and library group into the K–12 classroom, and in 2011, certain assets of Follett's public library business, BWI, were sold.

In April 2011, Alison O'Hara was named chairman of the board. Prior to becoming chairman, she served as assistant general counsel of Follett and was a member of the company's board of directors for 11 years. Under O'Hara's direction, the board underwent another transformation by bringing in outside directors to lead Follett into the digital future. O'Hara died unexpectedly on July 20, 2013, from complications of breast cancer.

In November 2012, Mary Lee Schneider was elected Follett's new president and CEO. Schneider was an 11-year veteran on the Follett Board of Directors. Schneider came to Follett from Chicago-based RR Donnelley, where she had been president, and Digital Solutions and Chief Technology Officer.

In January 2014, Follett Corporation's board of directors named Todd Litzsinger as chairman of the board. Litzsinger succeeded Steve Waichler, who held the role on an interim basis following the passing of O'Hara in 2013. Litzsinger joined Follett in 1992, and served on the board from 2003. He held a series of leadership positions with the company, becoming President of Content Solutions and Services for Follett School Solutions, the company's preK–12 business.

In March 2014, approximately 750 employees from the company's corporate office and its Chicago-area suburban operations in Oak Brook, Westmont, and River Grove relocated to Three Westbrook Corporate Center, a 160,000 square-foot tower in Westchester. On April 1, 2014, Follett's PreK–12 businesses became one legal entity named Follett School Solutions, Inc. This allowed the company to leverage the content and technology capabilities of its previously separate businesses: Follett Educational Services, Follett Library Resources and Follett Software Company.

In the 2010s, the company focused on e-commerce, and digital offerings and text rental, in addition to its core areas of expertise. In 2013, Follett was described as a $2.7 billion, privately held company serving 70,000 early childhood, primary and secondary schools, and more than 1,000 college campuses. It employed approximately 15,000 associates throughout the United States, Canada and other parts of the world.

In 2013, Follett laid off 570 bookstore employees.

In May 2015, Follett Corporation appointed Ray A. Griffith as president and CEO. Griffith left in March 2018.

Through 2021 and 2022, Follett sold its corporate entity and operating units, Follett School Solutions, Inc. and Follett Higher Education Group, completing the Follett family's exit after nearly 150 years. With the acquisition, Emmanuel Kolady, former SVP and Head of Stores for the eastern half of CVS Retail, was named CEO in February 2022.

In August 2021, Follett sold Follett School Solutions, its K-12 software and content division, to the investment firm Francisco Partners.

In November 2021, Follett sold Baker & Taylor to an investment group led by B&T CEO Aman Kochar.

In February 2022, Follett Higher Education and its corporate entity was acquired by an investment group led by Jefferson River Capital LLC. Emmanuel Kolady, Senior VP and Head of Stores for the eastern half of CVS Retail, was appointed CEO, and Ryan Petersen, VP of Strategy and Development at VitalSource Technologies, as president.

In January 2023, Helena B. Foulkes, a former executive at CVS Health and CEO at Hudson's Bay Company, was appointed executive chairwoman of Follett Higher Education's board of directors.

In March 2023, Follett announced a realignment of bookstore labor, creating new roles across store leadership, and creating specialist teams to manage course materials and other key functions.

In January 2024, approximately 60 Follett OTC employees were let go due to realignment structural changes.

In April 2024, approximately 60 Follett salaried managers were let go due to market sales failures.

== Acquisitions ==
In June 2015, Follett Corporation purchased Neebo, the retail division of the Nebraska Book Company, adding more than 200 retail store locations; Follett hired Neebo's employees as part of the transition.

In April 2016, Follett Corporation acquired Baker & Taylor, a distributor of books (physical and digital), video and music (physical only) products to mainly libraries, institutions (USA government & military) and some indie retailers. B&T subsequently exited the movies/music business, selling the division to Ingram Entertainment in January 2019. Not long after the purchase B&T pres/CEO departed Follett. Library industry veteran, George Coe had come to Follett in April 2016, as part of Follett's acquisition of Baker & Taylor, where Coe had served as president and CEO since 2014, and since 2000 had been president of B&T's library and education division, the company's largest group. Coe was later replaced as B&T president by book retailer, David Cully. After two years at the helm, in June 2019, Cully announced his retirement from Follett/B&T as of the end of August 2019. EVP Amandeep Kochar to run B&T upon Cully's departure.

In December 2016, Follett Corporation acquired Valore, an online textbook marketplace. Further acquisitions included Access-It Software in December 2022, a New Zealand developer of a library management system for schools since 1994.

In October 2022, Follett acquired Willo Labs, a solution which enables in-course purchasing of digital course materials when integrated into a campus Learning Management System.

In December 2022, Follett School Solutions acquired Access-It Software, which provides a library management system used in K–12 schools around the world.

In January 2023, Follett acquired Dyehard Fan Supply in a merger.

== Operating units ==
- Follett Higher Education Group – campus retailer
- Follett School Solutions, Inc. – content, technical solutions and customer support to PreK–12 libraries, classrooms, learning centers and school districts.

== See also ==
- List of book distributors
