= Quizlet =

American online studying platform

- Quizlet logo since 2021

- Screenshot The Quizlet website homepage
- Website type: Education
- Available in: English, German, Spanish, Chinese (Traditional and Simplified), Japanese, Korean, Brazilian Portuguese, Polish, Russian, French, Quebec French, Indonesian, Dutch, Italian, Turkish, Ukrainian, Vietnamese
- Headquarters: San Francisco, California
- Area served: 130 countries worldwide
- Owner: Quizlet Inc.
- Founder: Andrew Sutherland
- CEO: Kurt Beidler
- Revenue: Freemium (ads/subscriptions)
- Website: quizlet.com
- Registration: Optional
- Launched: January 17, 2007; 19 years ago

Quizlet is a multi-national American education technology company that provides digital study tools, including flashcards, practice quizzes, and collaborative learning games. The service was founded in 2006 by Andrew Sutherland and released publicly in 2007.

The platform is widely used in K-12 and higher education, and as of 2021, Quizlet reported more than 60 million monthly active users and over 500 million user-generated study sets. Quizlet operates on a freemium model, offering both free basic study tools and paid subscriptions with added features.

== History ==
=== Founding and early years (2005–2011) ===
Quizlet was founded in 2005 by Andrew Sutherland as a studying tool to aid in memorization while studying for his French class. In an AMA on Reddit, Sutherland said in the "first year and a half" he was "just playing around with it", but that he decided to make it public after convincing ~100 people to try the service. He formed a company called Brainflare with his father as the CFO/Secretary to take care of business concerns. Quizlet's blog, written mostly by Andrew in the earlier days of the company, claims it had reached 50,000 registered users in 252 days online (that is, on September 26, 2007). Quizlet released to the public in January 2007. In the following two years, Quizlet reached its 1,000,000th registered user. Sutherland later described the early years as financially challenging, with questions about longevity.

Until 2011, Quizlet shared staff and financial resources with the Collectors Weekly website.

In 2011, Quizlet added the ability to listen to content using text-to-speech.

=== Product expansion and growth (2012–2019) ===
In August 2012, it released an app for the iPhone and iPad and shortly afterward one for Android devices.

In 2015, Quizlet announced raising $12 million from Union Square Ventures, Costanoa Venture Capital, Altos Ventures, and Owl Ventures to expand its digital study tools and grow internationally. In a blog post, Sutherland later described the first 10 years of the company as "ten years of bootstrapping".

Quizlet hired Matt Glotzbach as CEO in May 2016 and launched a redesign in August 2016. Also in 2016, Quizlet launched "Quizlet Live", a real-time online matching game where teams compete to answer all 12 questions correctly without an incorrect answer along the way.

In 2017, 1 in 2 high school students used Quizlet.

In 2017, Quizlet created a premium offering called "Quizlet Go" (later renamed "Quizlet Plus"), with additional features available for paid subscribers. Glotzbach announced in 2018 that Quizlet would be opening offices in Denver, Colorado in 2018, announcing "a big vision at Quizlet to provide the most intelligent study tools in the world, and our expansion into Denver, a city with incredible tech ingenuity, will help us more quickly build the next generation of learning tools used by students everywhere".

=== Acquisitions and leadership changes (2020–present) ===
Andrew Sutherland left Quizlet at age 30 in 2020, citing disagreements with the executive team and a desire for a change.

During the COVID-19 pandemic, Glotzbach announced he was opening Quizlet's premium service, Quizlet Teacher, for free to all users who have an account registered as a teacher.

Quizlet made its first acquisition in March 2021, with the purchase of Slader, which offered detailed explanations of textbook concepts and practice problems, and eventually incorporated it into its paid platform, Quizlet Plus.

In November 2022, Quizlet announced a new CEO, Lex Bayer, the former CEO of Starship Technologies. In March 2023, Quizlet started to incorporate AI features with the release "Q-Chat", a virtual AI tutor powered by OpenAI's ChatGPT API.

Quizlet launched four additional AI powered features in August 2023 to assist with student learning. The company has also introduced AI-powered tutoring capabilities and live collaborative gameplay tools such as QuizletLive.

In July 2024, Kurt Beidler, the former co-CEO of Zwift, joined Quizlet as the new CEO.

In 2025, Quizlet introduced Course-Powered Quizlet, a feature that allows students to organize and share study materials by institution and course, supporting collaboration among classmates. The feature also uses large language models to help synthesize user-contributed notes into study guides and practice questions.

Quizlet acquired Coconote, an AI note-taking app that turns audio and video recordings into study materials, in February 2026.

In March 2026, Quizlet integrated with ChatGPT allowing users to generate study materials from notes, conversations, or recorded lectures.

== See also ==
- Anki
- Chegg
- Course Hero
- Kahoot!
- Gimkit
