= Study Notes =

Online learning tool

- Website type: Ed-tech
- Available in: English
- Owners: Study Notes, LLC
- Creator: Feross Aboukhadijeh
- Revenue: Freemium
- Website: https://www.apstudynotes.org
- Registration: Optional
- Launched: March 2007; 19 years ago
- Current status: Active
- Written in: Node.js (JavaScript)

Study Notes is an online learning tool created by high school junior Feross Aboukhadijeh in El Dorado Hills, California. It was released to the public in March 2007. By September 2011, Study Notes was receiving 10,000 page views per day. As of September 2015, Study Notes has served over 43 million users.

== History ==
Study Notes began as a way for the founder to share his Advanced Placement notes with his classmates. But it grew to include the notes of his classmates as well, covering three courses: AP English, U.S. History, and U.S. Government. The tool currently supports seven AP courses.

In 2014, Study Notes began offering a database of sample college essays for prospective college applicants to use for inspiration during their essay writing.

== Open Source ==
Study Notes releases the custom software which powers the site on GitHub under the GNU General Public License version 3, for anyone to learn from and contribute to.
