= SparkNotes =

Study guide website

- Website type: Study guide
- Available in: English
- Owner: Barnes & Noble
- Creators: Sam Yagan, Max Krohn, Chris Coyne, Eli Bolotin
- Website: sparknotes.com
- Commercial: Yes
- Registration: Optional
- Launched: September 1, 1999
- Current status: Active

SparkNotes, originally part of a website called The Spark, is a company started by Harvard students Sam Yagan, Max Krohn, Chris Coyne, and Eli Bolotin in 1999 that originally provided study guides for literature, poetry, history, film, and philosophy. Later on, SparkNotes expanded to provide study guides for a number of other subjects, including biology, chemistry, economics, health, math, physics, and sociology. Until 2022, when SparkNotes Plus, a paid service, released, SparkNotes did not charge users to use any of its resources. SparkNotes receives revenue from advertisements.

Barnes & Noble acquired SparkNotes.com in 2001 for approximately $3.5 million.

== History ==
TheSpark.com was a literary website launched by four Harvard students on January 7, 1999. Most of TheSpark's users were high school and college students. To increase the site's popularity, the creators published the first six literature study guides (called "SparkNotes") on April 7, 1999.

In 2000, the creators sold the site to iTurf Inc. The following year, Barnes & Noble purchased SparkNotes and selected fifty literature study guides to publish in print format. When Barnes & Noble printed SparkNotes, they stopped selling their chief competitor, CliffsNotes.

In January 2003, SparkNotes developed a practice test service called SparkNotes Test Prep. This project was followed by the release of SparkCharts, reference sheets that summarize a topic; No Fear Shakespeare, transcriptions of Shakespeare's plays into modern language; and No Fear Literature, transcriptions of literary classics like The Adventures of Huckleberry Finn and The Scarlet Letter into modern language.

In April 2022, a paid service, SparkNotes Plus, released, locking many works from the No Fear Shakespeare series, their modern translations of Shakespeare plays, among other things, behind a paywall, and adding new features.

== Criticism ==
Because SparkNotes provides study guides for literature that include chapter summaries, many teachers see the website as a cheating tool. These teachers argue that students can use SparkNotes as a replacement for actually completing reading assignments with the original material, or to cheat during tests using cell phones with Internet access.

SparkNotes states that it does not support academic dishonesty, or plagiarism. Instead, it suggests that students read the original material, and then check SparkNotes to compare their own interpretation of the text with the SparkNotes analysis.

In January 2019, site developers announced a complete redesign of the SparkLife section of the website in order to focus more on literature-related content. This announcement was met with a negative response from SparkLife users due to the removal of user-made accounts, blog posts, and comments.

== See also ==
- BookRags
- CliffsNotes
- Coles Notes
- Quizlet
- Schaum's Outlines
- Shmoop
- York Notes
