= Flashnotes =

Educational online marketplace

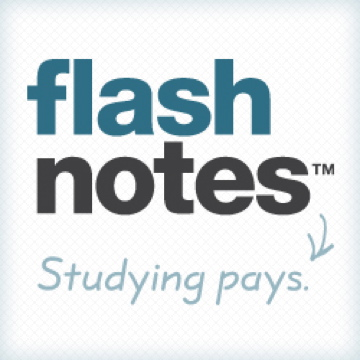
- Company type: Private
- Website type: Online marketplace
- Founded: 2009
- Headquarters: Boston, Massachusetts
- Founders: Michael Matousek; Steven Maggs; David Petruziello
- Website: www.flashnotes.com
- Registration: Required
- Users: 350+ Schools (February 2013)
- Current status: Inactive

Flashnotes is an online marketplace that allows college students to buy and sell course specific notes, study guides, flashcards and other items to help students study and/or earn money throughout their college years.

== History ==
In December 2009, Flashnotes was founded by Kent State University student Michael Matousek. After seeing other students struggle in several classes, and hearing them constantly ask to borrow other students' notes, Matousek created a solution that would help classmates by providing additional, student-created study resources. The result was Flashnotes. In 2012, Flashnotes moved to Boston. Flashnotes has partnered with other education companies including Cengage and Barnes and Nobles. In February 2014, this organization raised $3.6M in the funding round that included Stage 1 Ventures, Runa Capital and Atlas Ventures as the main investors. In 2014, Flashnotes purchased Moolaguides, a Florida-based ed-tech start-up. From 2015, the platform was called Luvo. As of 2016, Flashnotes raised up to $14 million from different funding rounds.

In May 2016, Flashnotes was shut down.

== Concept ==
Flashnotes works a reference tool for college students that are looking for additional help while studying for a variety of college courses. Flashnotes can also be a way for students to make extra money during their college years. Students interested in sharing their notes must create an account with the site. Then, they can upload as many notes as they want, and set their own price for each set of notes. If the notes are sold, the student keeps 70% of the price of the notes, while Flashnotes keeps the other 30%. Once the notes have been uploaded to the site, other students with an account can browse through all of the notes available at their school, narrow the search by course number or subject, or even search through all of the notes available from students at other colleges and universities throughout the country.

== Schools ==
Flashnotes is currently being used to buy and sell notes at 367 colleges and universities throughout the United States and Bishop's University in Sherbrooke, Quebec. If a user is the first person to upload notes from their school, that college or university will be added to the list of schools as soon as the notes have been uploaded.
