= Schaum's Outlines =

Textbook series

Schaum's Outlines (/ʃɔːm/) is a series of supplementary texts for American high school, AP, and college-level courses, currently published by McGraw-Hill Education Professional, a subsidiary of McGraw-Hill Education. The outlines cover a wide variety of academic subjects including mathematics, engineering and the physical sciences, computer science, biology and the health sciences, accounting, finance, economics, grammar and vocabulary, and other fields. In most subject areas the full title of each outline starts with Schaum's Outline of Theory and Problems of, but on the cover this has been shortened to simply Schaum's Outlines followed by the subject name in more recent texts.

== Background and description ==
The series was originally developed in the 1930s by Daniel Schaum (November 13, 1913 – August 22, 2008), son of eastern European immigrants. McGraw-Hill purchased Schaum Publishing Company in 1967. Titles are continually revised to reflect current educational standards in their fields, including updates with new information, additional examples, use of new technology (calculators and computers), and so forth. New titles are also introduced in emerging fields such as computer graphics.

Many titles feature noted authors in their respective fields, such as Murray R. Spiegel and Seymour Lipschutz. Originally designed for college-level students as a supplement to standard course textbooks, each chapter of a typical Outline begins with only a terse explanation of relevant topics, followed by many fully worked examples to illustrate common problem-solving techniques, and ends with a set of further exercises where usually only brief answers are given and not full solutions.

Despite being marketed as a supplement, several titles have become widely used as primary textbooks for courses (the Discrete Mathematics and Statistics titles are examples). This is particularly true in settings where an important factor in the selection of a text is the price, such as in community colleges.

== Easy Outlines ==
Condensed versions of the full Schaum's Outlines called "Easy Outlines" started to appear in the late 1990s, aimed primarily at high-school students, especially those taking AP courses. These typically feature the same explanatory material as their full-size counterparts, sometimes edited to omit advanced topics, but contain greatly reduced sets of worked examples and usually lack any supplementary exercises. As a result, they are less suited to self-study for those learning a subject for the first time, unless they are used alongside a standard textbook or other resource. They cost about half the price of the full outlines, however, and their smaller size makes them more portable.

== Comparison with other series ==
Schaum's Outlines are part of the educational supplements niche of book publishing. They are a staple in the educational sections of retail bookstores, where books on subjects such as chemistry and calculus may be found. Many titles on advanced topics are also available, such as complex variables and topology, but these may be harder to find in retail stores.

Schaum's Outlines are frequently seen alongside the Barron's "Easy Way" series and McGraw-Hill's own "Demystified" series. The "Demystified" series is introductory in nature, for middle and high school students, favoring more in-depth coverage of introductory material at the expense of fewer topics. The "Easy Way" series is a middle ground: more rigorous and detailed than the "Demystified" books, but not as rigorous and terse as the Schaum's series. Schaum's originally occupied the niche of college supplements, and the titles tend to be more advanced and rigorous. With the expansion of AP classes in high schools, Schaum's Outlines are positioned as AP supplements. The outline format makes explanations more terse than any other supplement. Schaum's has a much wider range of titles than any other series, including even some graduate-level titles.

== See also ==
- Barron's Educational Series
- CliffsNotes
- SparkNotes
