= Study guide =

Learning material to aid comprehension of a topic

A study guide can be anything that facilitates learning in a particular topic. It may be a textbook or other resource that fosters comprehension of literature, research topics, history, and other subjects.

General topics include study and testing strategies; reading, writing, classroom, project management skills, and certification preparation; as well as techniques for learning as an adult, with disabilities, and online. Some will summarize chapters of novels or the important elements of the subject. Study guides for math and science often present pene (as in problem-based learning) and will offer techniques of resolution.

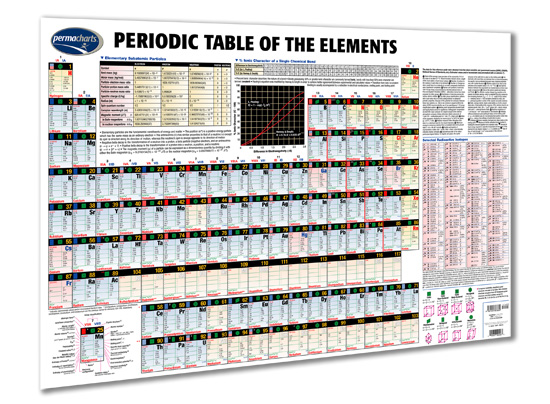
Study guide from Permacharts

Academic support centers in schools often develop study guides for their students, as do for-profit companies and individual students and professors. Once only found at local five and dime stores the internet brought about a new era of online sites with study material. Only CliffsNotes survived this transition to the internet. Examples of companies that produce study guides include Coles Notes, SparkNotes, CliffsNotes, Schaum's Outlines, Permacharts, and Study Notes.

Some high school teachers or college professors may compose study guides for their students to assist them with reading comprehension, content knowledge, or preparation for an examination. These study guides may be issued as an assignment to be completed or as a comprehensive selection of material assembled by the teacher.

== See also ==
- Guide to information sources
- Homework
- Problem-based learning
- Electronic learning
- Study skills
- Textbook
- Study Notes
- Syllabus
- FlashNotes
- Pathfinder (library science)
