= Course Hero =

American education technology company

- Website type: E-learning; Social learning network
- Available in: English
- Founded: October 2006; 19 years ago in Redwood City, California, U.S.
- Headquarters: 2000 Seaport Blvd; Redwood City, California
- Area served: Worldwide
- Owner: Learneo
- Founders: Andrew Grauer; Gregor Carrigan
- CEO: Andrew Grauer
- Industry: EdTech
- Website: coursehero.com
- Registration: Optional (required for uploading and downloading documents, viewing full tutor answers and asking questions)
- Current status: Active

Course Hero is an American education technology website company based in Redwood City, California, that operates an online learning platform for students to access course-specific study resources and online tutors.

The crowdsourced learning platform contains practice problems, study guides, infographics, class notes, step-by-step explanations, essays, lab reports, videos, user-submitted questions paired with answers from tutors, and original materials created and uploaded by educators. Users either buy a subscription or upload original documents to receive unlocks that are used to view and download full Course Hero documents.

== History ==
Course Hero was founded by Andrew Grauer at Cornell University in 2006 for college students to share lectures, class notes, exams, and assignments.

In 2014, the company raised $15 million in Series A Funding, with investors that included GSV Capital and IDG Capital. Seed investors SV Angel and Maveron also participated. In 2020, the company raised a further $10 million in Series B Funding, valuing the company at over $1 billion. The Series B round was led by NewView Capital, whose founder and managing partner, Ravi Viswanathan, joined Course Hero's board of directors. NewView Capital also contributed $30 million in an employee tender offer, a process by which NewView purchased company shares directly from Course Hero employees.

Course Hero acquired Symbolab, a mathematics problem solver, in October 2020, and acquired LitCharts, a literature guide resource, in June 2021. Terms of these acquisitions were not disclosed.

On August 21, 2021, Course Hero announced that it had acquired QuillBot, a software developed in 2017 that uses artificial intelligence to rewrite and paraphrase text.

In December 2021, Course Hero received a $380 million Series C at a $3.6 billion valuation. This financing was led by Wellington Management and included investors such as Sequoia Capital Global Equities, OMERS growth equity, and D1 Capital Partners.

== Controversy ==
Subscribers can download complete papers submitted by other students and submit them as their own work. The site also allows students to upload homework and get solutions from the site's contracted workers, as in an "essay mill". Users who upload content can use the site for free while others pay a fee.

=== Copyright concerns ===
The documents uploaded for sale are frequently the intellectual property of faculty members, not of the students who post them or sell them. Course Hero's Use Policy states that users must be authorized to post the file, but Course Hero does not verify this or notify copyright holders before submissions are uploaded. These files include exams and their keys, quizzes and their keys, and study guides written by instructors. Some papers include text copied from Wikipedia and some are simply copies of Wikipedia articles.

To protect copyright holders, Course Hero must remove infringing content in accordance with the Digital Millennium Copyright Act after receiving a takedown notice from the copyright owner. The University of California provides guidance to instructors regarding language to include in course materials that may prevent uploading to Course Hero and language to assert copyright and discourage students from uploading, but the process to remove copyrighted material is burdensome and discourages people from following through on such claims. According to some, the sheer volume of material on Course Hero makes takedown requests unlikely to succeed since professors must submit a long request for each document.

In March 2022, an assistant professor of business at Chapman University sued students for posting parts of his midterm and final exams on Course Hero.

Embry-Riddle University faculty developed a search tool called CourseVillain, which searches Course Hero for documents and other artifacts originating from their courses. It identified over 200,000 such artifacts. The tool automatically partially populates takedown request documents to aid university staff in asking Course Hero to remove their work from the site.

=== Personal and sensitive information ===
Student papers uploaded to Course Hero sometimes contain personal or sensitive information, which can then be shared with other users. When users register for Course Hero, they grant the company a perpetual license to use the uploaded material.
