= Ambassadors Group =

American education travel company

Ambassadors Group, Inc.
- Traded as: Nasdaq: EPAX
- Industry: Educational travel
- Founded: Spokane, Washington (1967)
- Headquarters: Spokane, Washington
- Revenue: ▲US$98.6 million (FY 2009)
- Operating income: ▲US$32.2 million (FY 2009)
- Net income: ▲US$20.3 million (FY 2009)
- Total assets: ▲US$128 million (FY 2009)
- Total equity: ▲US$91.0 million (FY 2009)
- Subsidiaries: BookRags
- Website: http://www.ambassadorsgroup.com/ at the Wayback Machine (archived July 13, 2013)

BookRags

- Website type: Internet Study guide and Lesson plan
- Available in: English
- Owner: Ambassadors Group
- Founders: James Yagmin and David Lieberman
- Website: www.bookrags.com
- Commercial: Yes
- Registration: Yes
- Current status: Active

Ambassadors Group, Inc. was a publicly traded educational travel company based in Spokane, Washington. It was originally an operating division of Ambassadors International, Inc., but was divested into a separate corporation in 2002 to form the company under its current name.

== History ==
- In 1956, President Dwight D. Eisenhower founded People to People.
- In 1967, Ambassadors Group is founded
- In 1995, Ambassadors Group became a wholly owned subsidiary of Ambassadors International, Inc. Jeffrey Thomas joined the company.
- In 1996, acquisition of Marc L. Bright (professionals). Jeffrey Thomas becomes President.
- In 1999, acquisition of Travel Dynamics (sport)
- In 2001, Jeffrey Thomas became CEO
- On February 28, 2002, Ambassadors Group spun off from Ambassadors International
- In March 2007, Ambassadors International bought Windstar from Carnival for $100 million.
- On May 15, 2008, Ambassadors Group bought BookRags, an educational website for $18 million. The merger was a friendly takeover.
- On March 17, 2009, Ambassadors Group announced its partnership with Discovery Education to become the travel provider for the new Discovery Student Adventures learning and adventure-based trips for students in grades 5–12. In 2010 approximately 125 students traveled.
- On April 30, 2013, Jeffey Thomas resigned from Ambassadors Group.
- On July 13, 2015, the company announced its imminent dissolution. Ambassadors Group cites losses of over $17.5 Million in 2014 and floundering sales as causes for closing up shop at the end of this year. A bankruptcy court in Delaware held a two-day auction and Anschutz Corporation won Windstar Cruises with a bid of $39 million.
- On October 8, 2015, it was announced that beginning in 2016, Enriching Cultural Experiences (ECE) International would serve as the travel provider of People to People International replacing the Ambassadors Group.

Travelers (thousands) :

years	1998	1999	2000	2001	2002	2003	2004	2005	2006	2007	2008	2009	2010
travelers	15.5	17.1	25.3	25.8	21.0	22.7	30.6	37.8	43.1	52.7	41.9	34.2	26.7

== BookRags ==
BookRags is an educational website that provides summaries, study guides, and lesson plans on literary works. Based in Chicago, Illinois, United States, the website is a subsidiary of Gradesaver LLC. BookRags was founded in 1999 by James Yagmin and David Lieberman, who had recently graduated from college. On May 15, 2008, BookRags was bought by Ambassadors Group for $18 million. The merger was a friendly takeover.

BookRags contains concise book summaries and thorough analysis of more than 6,000 literary works, which is, according to one source, the largest collection online. It also has a list of characters and their descriptions, as well as an important quotes section. The website has over 10,000 e-Books in its collection and 8,400 biographies in its database. It facilitates students purchasing duplicates of fellow students' papers.
