= Indigo Kills Kids =

Canadian boycott campaign

Indigo Kills Kids is a Canadian-based grassroots Pro-Palestinian campaign to boycott the book retailer Indigo.

The campaign accuses Indigo of "oppression of Palestinians and its complicity in Israel’s genocide in Gaza" because the CEO, Heather Reisman, is a co-founder of the HESEG Foundation, which they claim incentivizes people to join the Israel Defense Forces (IDF) by providing financial support to IDF veterans without ties to Israel. The campaign calls on the Canadian Revenue Agency to revoke HESEG Foundation's charitable status, due to their estimated $180 million in support for "Israeli Defense Force (IDF) and illegal occupation of the West Bank."

On August 12, 2024, Indigo Kills Kids launched its campaign calling on people to boycott Canadian book retailer Indigo. They received a cease and desist letter from Indigo on August 29, 2024 demanding they stop infringing intellectual property laws, remove "false and defamatory content," and stop interfering with the business and reputation of Indigo.

On September 17, 2024, the Federal Court (Canada) granted an emergency injunction by Indigo requesting internet service providers to block the campaign's website. Days later, the court issued a two-year injunction inhibiting the campaign from operating their website and social media accounts on the basis of copyright infringement of the Indigo Kids logo. Representatives from the campaign did not attend the court hearings. The court action prompted the campaign to change their website URL from indigokillskids.ca to boycottindigobooks.com.

The campaign organized a "day of action" on September 25, 2024. This protest saw gatherings and protests at more than 40 of the stores throughout Canada.

In April 2025, the anti-war organization World Beyond War defended Indigo Kills Kids stating that the campaign "simply tried to share the public facts about Indigo and Reisman’s connection to the Israeli military". Writing in Canadian Dimension, artist Michael DeForge accused Indigo's Heather Reisman of abusing the court system.
