= Brendan Frey =

Canadian computer scientist (born 1968)

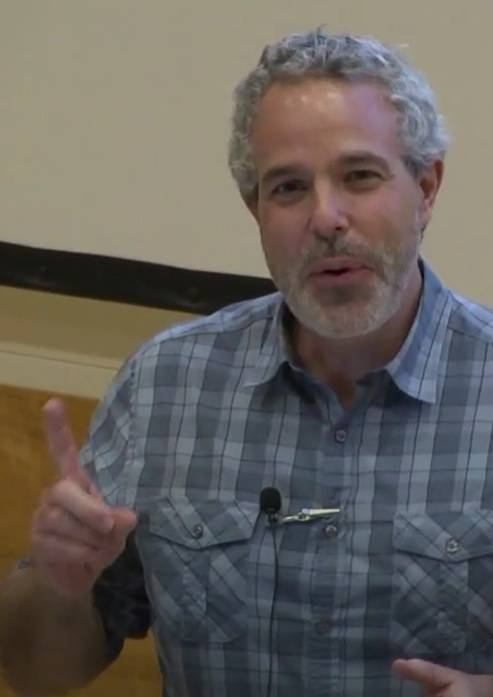
- Frey in 2016
- Born: Brendan John Frey; 29 August 1968 (age 57); Calgary, Alberta, Canada
- Education: University of Calgary; University of Manitoba; University of Toronto (PhD)
- Known for: Deep Genomics Inc; Vector Institute; Genome biology; Wake-Sleep Algorithm; Affinity Propagation; Factor Graphs
- Awards: FRSC (2015); John C. Polanyi (2012)
- Scientific career
- Fields: Machine learning; Genome biology; Computer engineering
- Institutions: Deep Genomics Inc; University of Toronto; University of Waterloo; University of Illinois; Bell-Northern Research
- Thesis: Graphical Models for Machine Learning and Digital Communication (1997)
- Doctoral advisor: Geoffrey Hinton
- Website: www.psi.toronto.edu/~frey/

Brendan John Frey FRSC (born 29 August 1968) is a Canadian computer scientist, entrepreneur, and engineer. He is Founder and CEO of Deep Genomics, Cofounder of the Vector Institute for Artificial Intelligence and Professor of Engineering and Medicine at the University of Toronto. Frey is a pioneer in the development of machine learning and artificial intelligence methods, their use in accurately determining the consequences of genetic mutations, and in designing medications that can slow, stop or reverse the progression of disease.

As far back as 1995, Frey co-invented one of the first deep learning methods, called the wake-sleep algorithm, the affinity propagation algorithm for clustering and data summarization, and the factor graph notation for probability models. In the late 1990s, Frey was a leading researcher in the areas of computer vision, speech recognition, and digital communications.

== Education ==
Frey studied computer engineering and physics at the University of Calgary (BSc 1990) and the University of Manitoba (MSc 1993), and then studied neural networks and graphical models as a doctoral candidate at the University of Toronto under the supervision of Geoffrey Hinton (PhD 1997). He was an invited participant of the Machine Learning program at the Isaac Newton Institute for Mathematical Sciences in Cambridge, UK (1997) and was a Beckman Fellow at the University of Illinois at Urbana Champaign (1999).

== Career ==
Following his undergraduate studies, Frey worked as a junior research scientist at Bell-Northern Research from 1990 to 1991. After completing his postdoctoral studies at the University of Illinois at Urbana-Champaign, Frey was an assistant professor in the Department of Computer Science at the University of Waterloo, from 1999 to 2001.

In 2001, Frey joined the Department of Electrical and Computer Engineering at the University of Toronto and was cross-appointed to the Department of Computer Science, the Banting and Best Department of Medical Research and the Terrence Donnelly Centre for Cellular and Biomolecular Research. From 2008 to 2009, he was a visiting researcher at Microsoft Research (Cambridge, UK) and a visiting professor in the Cavendish Laboratories and Darwin College at Cambridge University. Between 2001 and 2014, Frey consulted for several groups at Microsoft Research and acted as a member of its Technical Advisory Board.

In 2002, a personal crisis led Frey to face the fact that there was a tragic gap between our ability to measure a patient's mutations and our ability to understand and treat the consequences. Recognizing that biology is too complex for humans to understand, that in the decades to come there would be an exponential growth in biology data, and that machine learning is the best technology we have for discovering relationships in large datasets, Frey set out to build machine learning systems that could accurately predict genome and cell biology.

Frey’s group pioneered much of the early work in the field and over the next 15 years published more papers in leading-edge journals than any other academic or industrial research lab.

In 2015, Frey founded Deep Genomics, with the goal of building a company that can produce effective and safe genetic medicines more rapidly and with a higher rate of success than was previously possible.

The company has received 240 million dollars in funding to date from leading Bay Area investors, including the backers of SpaceX and Tesla.
