= Banting Institute =

Former Toronto University medical building (1930 to 2025)

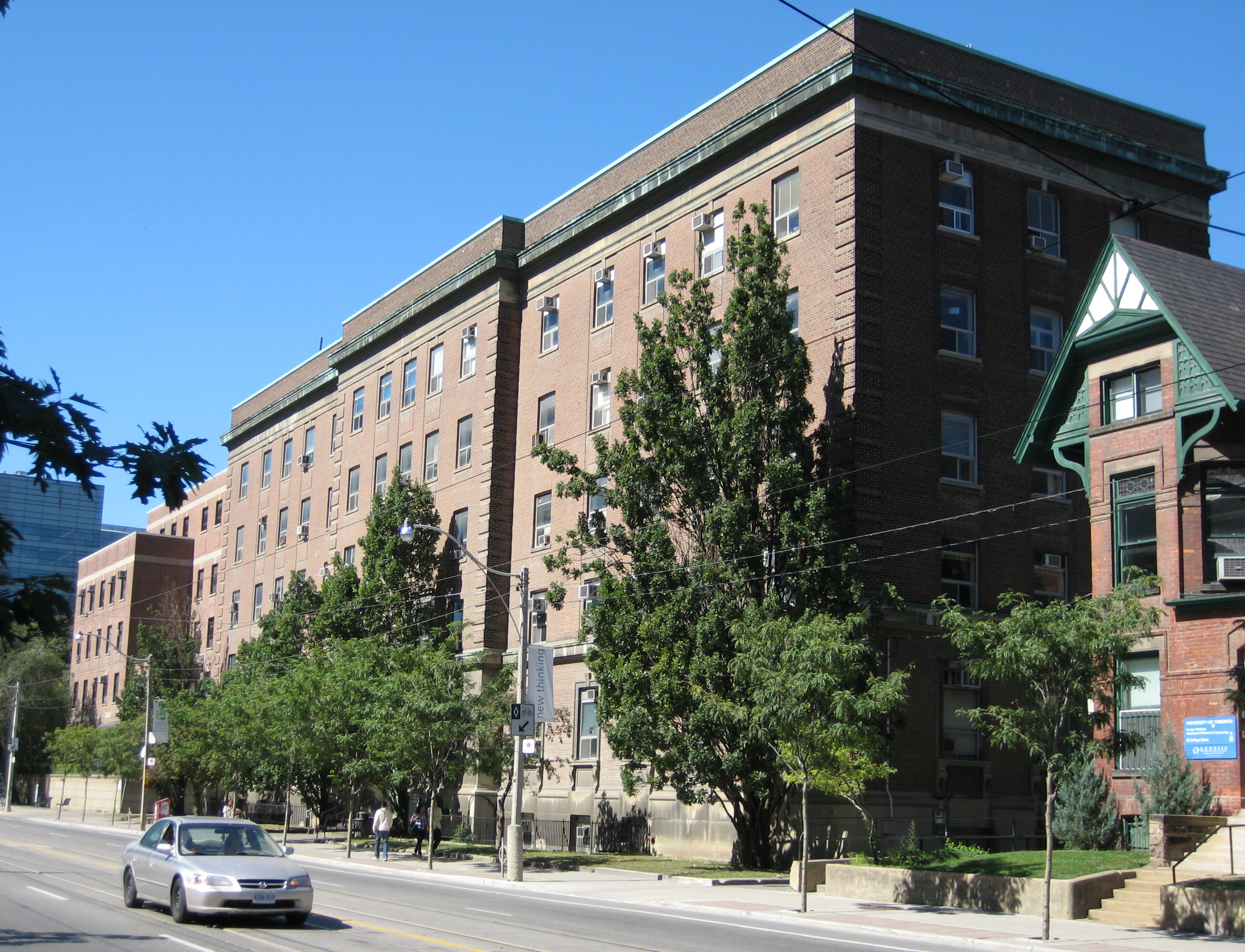
Banting Institute, south and east elevations

The Banting Institute was a University of Toronto medical research facility on its St. George campus from 1930 to 2005. It was demolished in 2025 to build the Schwartz Reisman Innovation Campus.

== History ==
Frederick Banting, with the support of John Macleod and Macleod's student Charles Best, had isolated insulin and administered it to a diabetic patient in 1922, a medical discovery for which Banting and Macleod were awarded the Nobel Prize in Physiology or Medicine in 1923. The University of Toronto subsequently created the Banting and Best Chair of Medical Research, Canada's first research professorship, which Banting occupied as the first holder. In 1928, the university commissioned Darling and Pearson to construct a new university building at 100 College Street on opposite Toronto General Hospital to accommodate both Banting's new department, and other medical departments that had hitherto been housed within with the hospital. The institute was completed in 1930 at a cost of CA$900,000 (equivalent to about $16,240,000 in 2025).

The opening ceremony was held on September 16, 1930. Berkeley Moynihan, the then President of the Royal College of Surgeons of England, officiated at the ceremony.

== Architecture ==
The Banting Institute was built by Darling and Pearson in Georgian revival style, as were many of the University's facilities that were constructed between 1900 and 1940. It was constructed of stone with brick cladding in the shape of a U: the main section to the south was 5 1/2 storeys (comprising the library, laboratories, treatment rooms, offices, and Banting's own department on the fifth floor); the west wing was 4 1/2 storeys (comprising more laboratories and lecture rooms); and the east wing was 2 1/2 storeys (comprising the main lecture theatre). An underground passage connected the institute, on the north side of College Street, to the hospital on the south.

== Operation ==
The Banting and Best Department of Medical Research was housed at the Banting Institute until 2005. In 1953, the university commemorated Banting's partner, Charles Best - who had taken over leadership of the department following Banting's death in 1941 - by commissioning a complementary building to the east at 112 College Street. The Best Institute was designed by Mathers and Haldenby and opened in 1954. A bridge connected both institutes.

In spite of an attempt to preserve the building in 2020, the Banting Institute was demolished in 2025 to make way for the second phase of the Schwartz Reisman Innovation Campus. The Best Institute had been demolished a few years previously in 2019 for the first phase of the development.

== Sources ==
- MacDonald, Mary L. (August 7, 2020). Inclusion on the City of Toronto's Heritage Register and Intention to Designate under Part IV, Section 29 of the Ontario Heritage Act - 100 College Street (PDF) (Report). Toronto City Planning Department. Archived (PDF) from the original on March 9, 2021.
- "THE BANTING INSTITUTE University of Toronto". Canadian Public Health Journal. 21 (10): 519–520. 1930. ISSN 0319-2652. JSTOR 41976035.
- "The Banting Institute". British Medical Journal. 2 (3640): 609. 1930. ISSN 0007-1447. JSTOR 25337548.
- Teles, Anthony (August 25, 2023). "U of T's Schwartz Reisman Innovation Centre Phase 1 Nears Completion". UrbanToronto. Archived from the original on November 29, 2023.
- Pahwa, Vik (March 24, 2025). "Banting Breakdown". vikpahwa.com. Archived from the original on September 21, 2025.
