= Indigo 11 =

Canadian Gaza war protest group

The Indigo 11 are a group of eleven protestors against the Gaza war in Canada who were arrested in November 2023 following vandalism of an Indigo Books and Music outlet in Toronto, Ontario.

== Background ==
The Gaza war broke out on October 2023 with the October 7 attacks. The subsequent response by Israel has killed over 70,000 Palestinians (though the number was much lower at the time of the arrests), and has been later characterized by some experts as a genocide. There have been numerous protests against the war in Canada.

Indigo Books and Music is a major English-language bookstore chain in Canada. Indigo was founded by Jewish-Canadian businesswoman Heather Reisman. Reisman has philanthropically supported former Israeli military lone soldiers through the HESEG Foundation, which she co-founded with Gerry Schwartz.

== Events ==
On 10 November 2023, an Indigo Books and Music bookstore in downtown Toronto was targeted by vandalism, with red paint being thrown over the storefront along with graffiti targeting Indigo CEO Heather Reisman.

On 14 November, Toronto Police arrested one person over the vandalism. Ten more were arrested on 22 November, in a series of armed police raids in the middle of the night. The next day, the police announced that the eleven arrested would be charged with criminal mischief over $5,000 as well as conspiracy to commit an indictable offence, and that the vandalism was being investigated as a hate-motivated offence. On 30 November, the police further announced that the 11 would each be charged with an additional count of criminal harassment.

Several of those arrested were identified as faculty members of York University. The university suspended those faculty members.

In early-January 2024, the first court hearing was held for the case in the Ontario Court of Justice. On 17 May 2024, charges against four of the 11 were dropped.

In November 2024, lawyers for the accused filed an application to the court after documents were released revealing that Reisman had spoken directly to Toronto Police chief Myron Demkiw within hours of the vandalism.

In January 2025, two individuals pleaded guilty to reduced charges and received absolute discharges. In March 2025 charges against three additional individuals were withdrawn. The last two charged individuals were each given a conditional discharge in April 2025.

== Reactions ==
The case provoked significant debate about antisemitism, the right to protest, and academic freedom in Canada.

Occurring on the 85th anniversary of Kristallnacht, a Nazi pogrom in which Jewish businesses were vandalized and destroyed, the Indigo vandalism was described by some as antisemitic and intended to intimidate. Liberal Party of Canada MP and former Minister of Public Safety Marco Mendicino called the vandalism "a vile coordinated attack intent on doing harm to [Reisman's] business" perpetrated "for the simple reason that she is Jewish and supports a charitable effort in Israel." Former Canadian Anti-Hate Network chair Bernie Farber described the vandalism as a "classic case" of antisemitism, saying that when the Jews "see this kind of attack on Jewish businesses, we see our history flashing before our eyes." The Friends of Simon Wiesenthal Center for Holocaust Studies called the vandalism "a vile antisemitic attack."

At a Jews Say No to Genocide Coalition event, Jewish-Canadian author Naomi Klein described the case as "an attack on political speech the likes of which I have not seen in Canada in my lifetime." Academic Faisal Kutty called the arrests "incredibly expensive and aggressive" and warned that the case risked "disrepute to the concept of hate-motivated crimes, and the Canadian justice system."

In January 2024, Global News reported that not all of the eleven may have known each other before being arrested. The Global News investigation found no "overt connection" between all eleven, but did find that at least six of the eleven had previously been involved in a Toronto branch of No one is illegal.

The British Columbia Civil Liberties Association called for York University to reinstate Professor Lesley Wood, saying that "her suspension further contributes to the chilly environment in respect of expressing pro-Palestinian views on Canadian university campuses." The International Sociological Association also released a statement calling for Wood to be reinstated, saying that her suspension undermined "the fundamental right and, indeed, the core responsibility of academics to freely speak out about public matters as citizens and scholars without fear of reprisal" and had been done "despite vigorous opposition from the Department of Sociology at York." The Canadian Sociological Association also released a statement calling for Wood to be reinstated.
