= Chapters (bookstore) =

Canadian big box bookstore brand

Chapters Inc.
- Type: Subsidiary
- Industry: Retail
- Founded: 1995, Toronto, Ontario
- Headquarters: Toronto, Ontario
- Number of locations: 20
- Key people: Heather Reisman; Lawerence Stevenson
- Products: Books, music, DVDs, gifts
- Parent: Indigo Books and Music (2001–present)
- Website: www.chapters.indigo.ca

Chapters, the big box bookstore banner is owned by Indigo.

Chapters Inc. is a Canadian big box bookstore banner owned by Indigo Books and Music. Formerly a separate company competing with Indigo, the combined company has continued to operate both banners since their merger in 2001. As of July 2017, it operated 89 superstores under the banners Chapters and Indigo, and 122 small format stores under the banners Coles, Indigospirit, SmithBooks and The Book Company.

== History ==
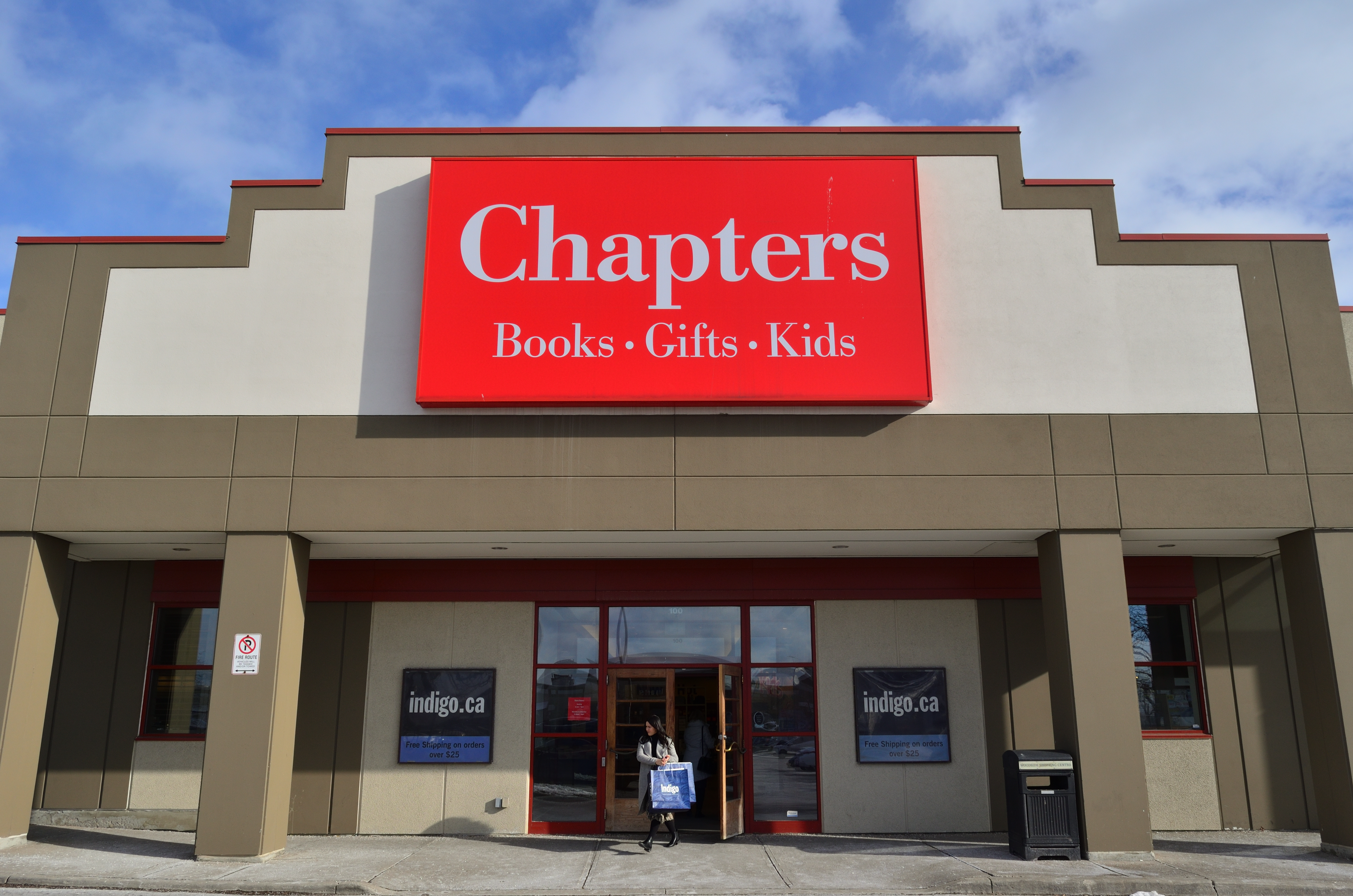
A Chapters in Markham, Ontario.

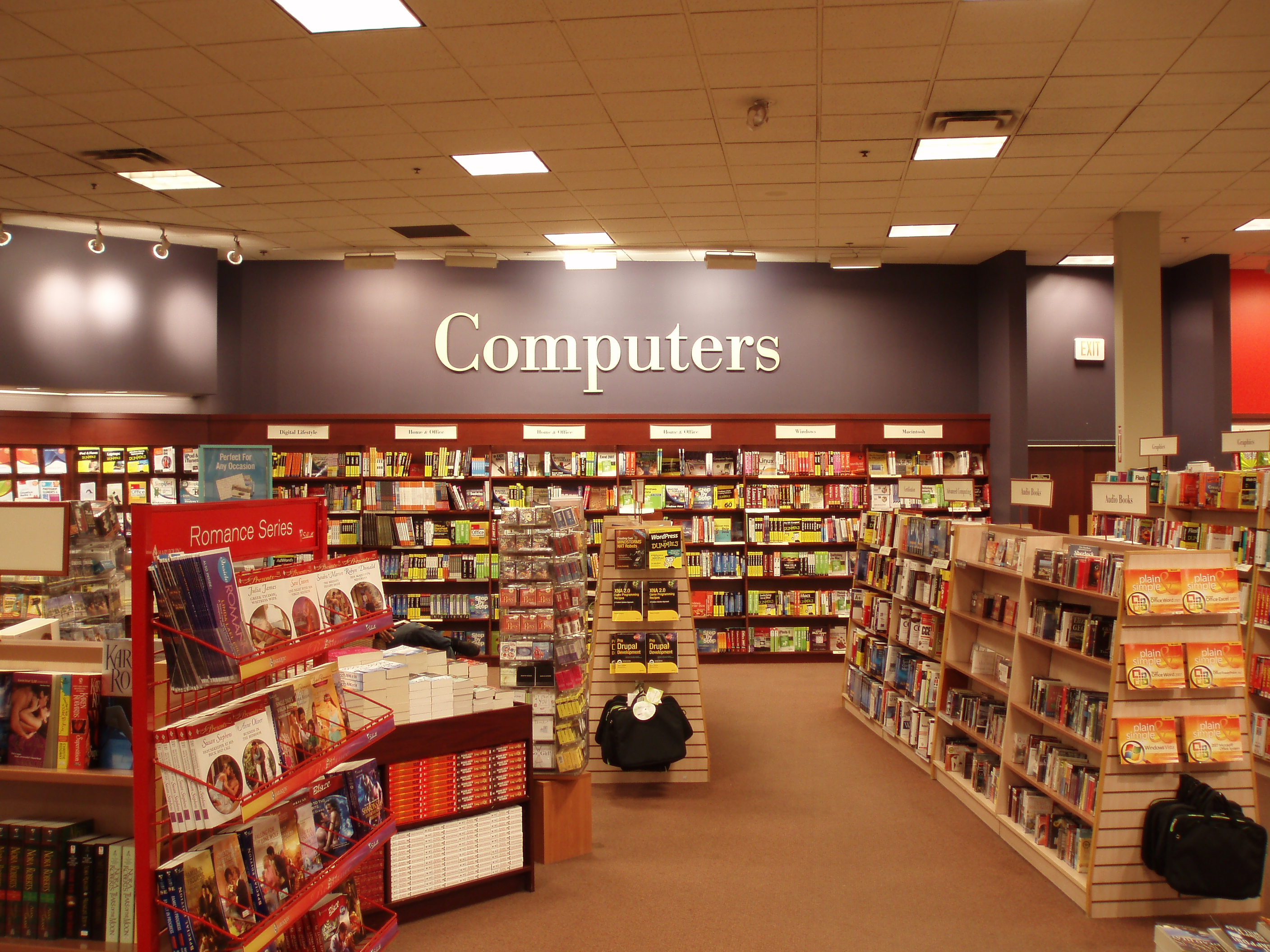
Inside Chapters in Markham, Ontario in October 2008.

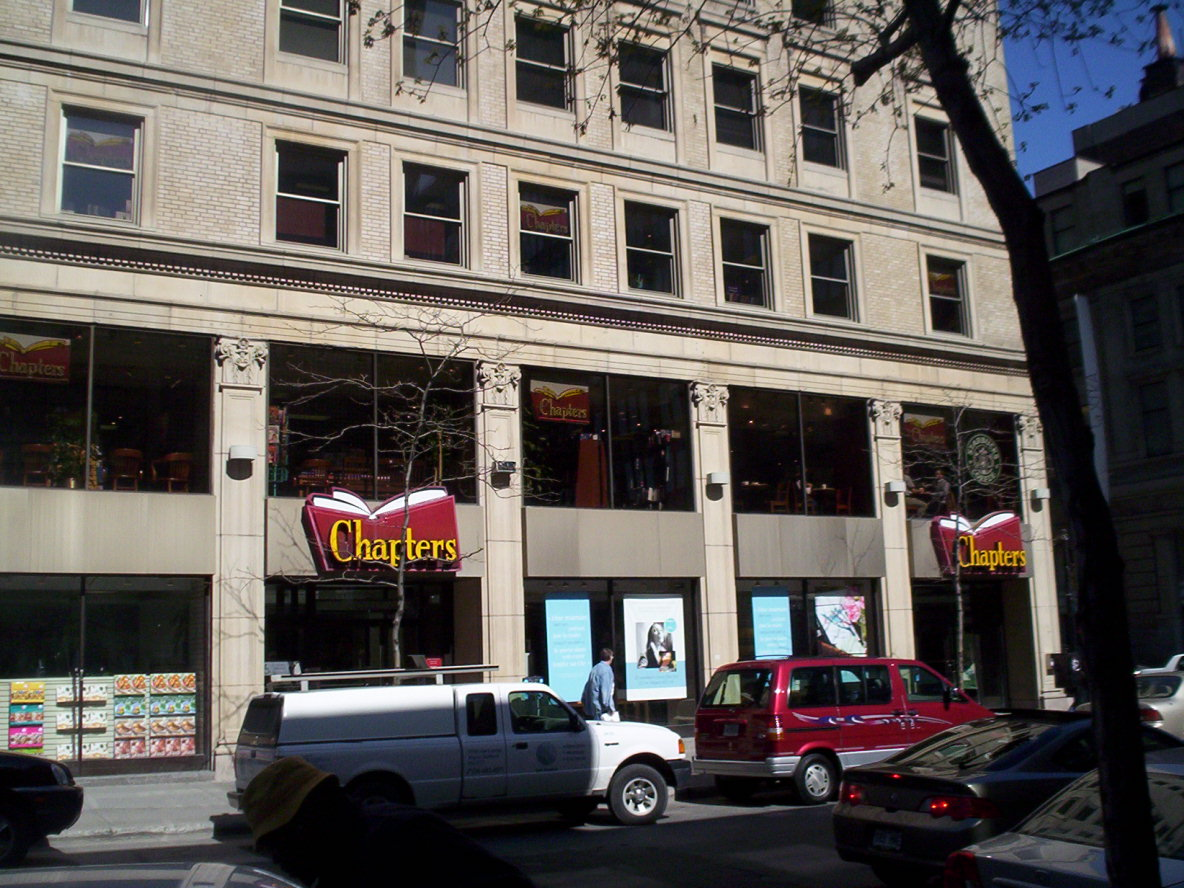
Chapters' former Downtown Montreal store in the Castle Building in April 2006, eight years before closing. (closed October 4, 2014).

Chapters Inc. was created in 1994 when founder and CEO Lawrence Stevenson led the buyout and merger of Canada's two largest book chains at the time: Coles and SmithBooks (formerly the Canadian division of U.K. book chain W. H. Smith). SmithBooks was acquired from Federal Industries and Coles was acquired from Southam Inc. Canadian General Capital and Pathfinder Capital bought these two chains to build large-format book superstores comparable to those of the American bookstore chains Barnes & Noble and Borders.

The new company was created in April 1995 and the first two book superstores were opened in November 1995. The original superstores were in Burlington, Ontario, and Burnaby, British Columbia.

Chapters quickly changed the face of Canada's book selling industry. Previously, companies like Coles and Smithbooks had many small stores. Chapters built large box stores with a much larger product selection. Chapters provided chairs and couches for their customers, as well as Starbucks coffee shops, and did not discourage reading inside the store. The company became Canada's largest book retailer, with 77 superstores branded as Chapters and more than 280 mall-based stores under the names Coles, SmithBooks (formerly the Canadian branch of W H Smith), Classic Bookshops, the Book Company, and Active Minds. However, the SmithBooks, the Book Company, and Classic Bookshops names have been gradually phased and locations rebranded as Coles stores in recent years. Canada's first book superstore, Toronto's World's Biggest Bookstore, once part of the Coles chain, was also owned by Chapters and had continued to operate under its original name.

Chapters grew quickly. It was criticized, however, for several reasons. It was blamed for the demise of several independent bookstores across Canada, especially alternative stores carrying obscure or controversial titles. Although it was said that Chapters also built its business around moving massive numbers of a few bestsellers, the majority of its sales came from backlist titles. As the company's market share grew, it represented the lion's share of many publishers' sales.

Chapters did not keep the box book store market to itself, however, with the opening of Indigo. Headed by Heather Reisman, Indigo began to compete with Chapters in select markets and opened 14 stores. Chapters aggressively expanded into online bookselling with chapters.ca to compete with Amazon and also was a minority investor in Pegasus, a book wholesaler. Pegasus was needed to be able to serve the online sales but the business was resisted by Canadian publishers and was not successful. In the autumn of 2000 Indigo launched a hostile takeover. Indigo was able to convince the Competition Bureau that Indigo was not a viable standalone business given the enormous losses that it was sustaining and thus had to be able to merge with the profitable Chapters retail chain. By early 2001, Indigo had been successful in purchasing Chapters, but kept both the Chapters and Indigo brands; subsequently a number of Chapters stores near Indigo locations were closed. In some cases, Coles and SmithBooks stores were shut down if they were too close to a Chapters site.

Although there are still some aesthetic differences between the store designs of the Chapters and Indigo banners, they now share many common elements. Moreover, aside from Indigo's larger focus on music, product selection and special offers are not generally distinguishable from one to the other. Indigo has adopted the Starbucks cafes that were in Chapters stores and has reduced the seating areas in Chapters stores and introduced a very wide range of non-book products which had been carried at Indigo.

Starting in 2014, the company began to diversify the types of products offered in store, such as coffee mugs and tea cups, cutlery, bathrobes, and throw blankets. While these items are displayed near the front of most stores, the majority of floor space in Chapters locations continues to be dedicated to books, magazines and stationery.

On January 1, 2018, the Chapters location in Bayview Village Shopping Centre was closed 18 years after its opening. As a result of changes proposed by the owner to develop the site, the LCBO store moved into the former Chapters location in 2019.

== Criticism and controversies ==
Since its takeover by Indigo, Chapters has been involved in several controversies, often tied to censorship concerns, or the strong support for Israel by the owner Heather Reisman and her husband Gerry Schwartz. Reisman and Schwartz head the HESEG Foundation, which provides scholarships for discharged lone-soldiers who served in the Israel Defense Forces.

The book "Mein Kampf" by Adolf Hitler was removed from the shelves of Chapters. There was controversy in the fact that the book is sometimes used in a historical context and some university or high school courses have the book on their syllabus.
