= Vector Institute =

Vector Institute may refer to:

- State Research Center of Virology and Biotechnology VECTOR, Russian biology and virology research institute
- Vector Institute (Canada), Canadian artificial intelligence research institute
