= Heather Reisman =

Canadian businesswoman

Heather Reisman OC
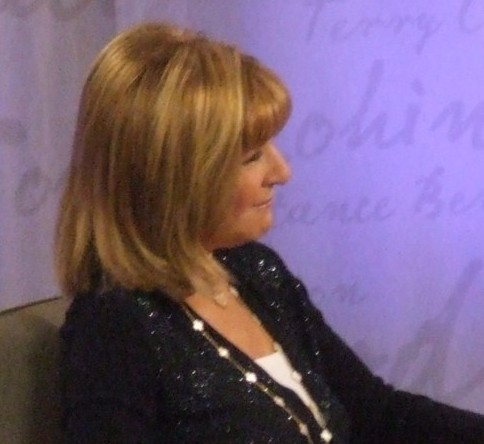
- Reisman in 2007
- Born: August 28, 1948 (age 78); Montreal, Quebec, Canada
- Education: McGill University
- Occupations: CEO of Indigo Books and Music; Co-founder and past Chair of Kobo
- Spouse: Gerald Schwartz
- Children: 4

Heather Maxine Reisman OC (born August 28, 1948) is a Canadian businesswoman and philanthropist. Reisman is the founder and chief executive of the Canadian retail chain Indigo Books and Music. She is the co-founder and past Chair of Kobo, and was appointed an Officer of the Order of Canada in 2019.

== Early life and education ==
Reisman was born in 1948 to a Jewish family in Montreal, Quebec and educated at McGill University.

== Career ==
Reisman was first employed in social work as a caseworker. After her first marriage ended in divorce, she switched careers and joined her brother Howard's company. In 1979, she co-founded Paradigm Consulting and served as the managing director of this strategic change consultancy until 1995.

In 1995, she was invited to become a "front-line investor" for Borders, which was planning to enter the Canadian market. When Borders was unable to obtain the necessary federal regulatory approval in Canada, Reisman founded a company called Indigo Books and Music. She raised $25m from a group of investors based on the original concept document for Indigo. In 2001, Indigo Books and Music acquired its main rival, Chapters, to form the largest book retailer in Canada, obtaining a clear leadership position in the book retailing industry. Reisman co-founded Kobo Inc. in 2009 and two years later, sold Indigo's majority stake in Kobo to the Japanese company Rakuten for $315 million.

Since 1998, Reisman has also chosen more than 262 "Heather's Picks" for Indigo, which are books specifically recommended by her and come with a money-back guarantee.

Although Indigo has increasingly stocked giftware in its stores, Reisman said this in a 2018 interview about the company's core product: "Books were, are, and always will be the heart and soul of our business". She began expanding Indigo into the US in 2018, starting with the first store at Short Hills in New Jersey.

Reisman has also served as a governor of the Toronto Stock Exchange and of McGill University. She has been a board member of several companies, including Williams Sonoma and J. Crew. She is currently a Director of Onex Corporation and Mt. Sinai Hospital.

In 2014, Reisman was executive producer of Fed Up along with Katie Couric, who also narrated the documentary, and producer Laurie David. Reisman was executive producer with David on The Social Dilemma in 2020. Reisman and David also authored a book together titled Imagine It! A Handbook for a Happier Planet (2021).

== Advocacy and politics ==
In August 2006, due to differing reactions by the two main Canadian political parties to the 2006 Lebanon War, Reisman withdrew her longtime support for the Liberal Party of Canada and chose to support the Conservative Party of Canada under Stephen Harper.

She drew praise and criticism in October 2001 after announcing that Indigo would not sell Hitler's Mein Kampf in its bookstores.

On July 5, 2010, Reisman launched an online petition to save an Iranian woman, Sakineh Ashtiani, from the death penalty by stoning. Her initiative found support around the world. Sakineh was not subjected to the stoning.

Reisman is a member of the Steering Committee of the Bilderberg Group, and participated in all its conferences between 2002 and 2017.

=== Israel ===
Heather Reisman is the co-founder of the HESEG Foundation for Lone Soldiers alongside her husband, Gerald Schwartz. Every year, the organization provides millions of dollars' worth of support to former "lone soldiers" who have recently served in the Israeli military. This support is provided in the form of scholarships, a living wage, and career development opportunities. As "lone soldiers," recipients are generally non-Israeli Jews who volunteered to join the Israeli Defense Forces, or individuals who served in the Israeli Military after immigrating to Israel.

While there have been campaigns protesting Reisman's financial support for Israeli soldiers since 2007, the 2023-2024 war with Hamas has led to a renewed campaign targeting Reisman's HESEG Foundation. Protestors have cited that HESEG – which enjoys the significant tax benefits associated with holding charitable status in Canada – provides support for the soldiers of a state that is currently on trial for genocide in the International Court of Justice. In November 2023, Toronto Police conducted night raids against 7 activists who had allegedly put up posters on the outside of Indigo stores alleging that Reisman was complicit in genocide for raising funds supporting Israeli lone soldiers through her HESEG Foundation. Nighttime no-knock raids are an aggressive policing practice typically reserved for serious gun and drug cases. The arrest of the Indigo 11 resulted in four guilty pleas for mischief with two individuals receiving absolute discharges and two receiving conditional discharges and charges against seven others being withdrawn.

== Philanthropy ==
In 2006, Reisman founded the Indigo Love of Reading Foundation, whose mission is to enrich the libraries in under-resourced public schools. Since its inception, the group has donated millions of books to over 3,000 Canadian public elementary school libraries.

In 2005, she and her husband Gerald Schwartz founded the HESEG Foundation, which provides scholarships to former Israeli "lone soldiers." Lone soldiers are generally non-Israelis serving as volunteers in the Israeli military, or individuals who are serving in the IDF after immigrating to Israel. Such soldiers are "lone" in the sense that they do not have immediate family in the country.

Mount Sinai Hospital announced in December 2013 that a $15 million gift from Reisman and Schwartz would be used to "reshape emergency medicine" at the facility.

The Gerald Schwartz and Heather Reisman Foundation donated $5.3 million to St. Francis Xavier University in Antigonish, Nova Scotia in late 2018 to create scholarships, bursaries and increased recruitment of business students.

In March 2019, the University of Toronto announced that Schwartz and Reisman were giving the university $100 million to build a 750,000-square foot innovation centre, through The Gerald Schwartz & Heather Reisman Foundation. According to Reisman, the Schwartz Reisman Innovation Campus will be used to improve technology, particularly artificial intelligence, and how the public can relate to it. One of the two towers will house the Schwartz Reisman Institute for Technology and Society and the Vector Institute for Artificial Intelligence while the other will include labs for research in regenerative medicine, genetics and precision medicine.

== Awards ==
In May 2015, Reisman was inducted into the Canadian Business Hall of Fame.

Reisman is the recipient of honorary doctorates from Ryerson University (2006), Wilfrid Laurier University (2009), Mount Allison University (2010), St. Francis Xavier University (2013), and University of Manitoba (2016) McGill University (2017), Weizmann Institute of Science (2017), and University of Toronto (2021).

She is an Officer of the Order of Canada.

In 2009, the Financial Times listed Reisman as one of the top 50 businesswomen in the world.

Reisman was also included in the Women's Executive Network's Top 100 Most Powerful Women.

In 2022, she was inducted into Canada's Walk of Fame in Toronto as "Canada’s Most Recognized Literacy Advocate".

== Personal life ==
Reisman's father, Mark, was a real estate developer; her mother, Rose, owned a clothing store; and her brother, Howard, founded computer company Time Systems. She is the niece of Simon Reisman.

Reisman was married earlier in her life but divorced her first husband. In 1982, she married Gerald Schwartz, the founder and CEO of Onex Corporation. Reisman has four children and nine grandchildren. Two of the children are from her first marriage and two are step-children from her marriage to Schwartz. The couple are members of the Reform synagogue, Holy Blossom Temple in Toronto.

== See also ==
- List of Bilderberg participants
- List of companions of the Order of Canada
