= Moshe Theumim =

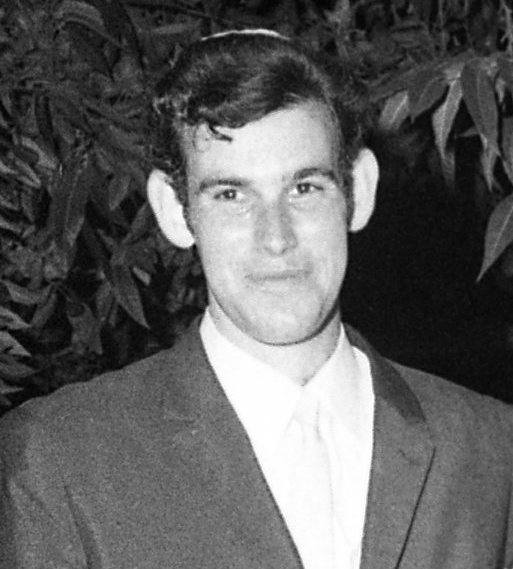
Moshe Theumim

Moshe Theumim (Hebrew: משה "מושיק" תאומים) is one of Israel's advertising pioneers. He is the CEO of the Gitam / BBDO advertising agency in Tel Aviv. He has served as an advisor to numerous Israeli politicians and businessmen, including Israel former Prime Minister Ehud Olmert and other cabinet ministers, notably Nobel Peace Prize winner and former Israel Prime Minister Shimon Peres and Haim Ramon.

Moshe Theumin is also on the board of the Jewish Agency and the Peres Center for Peace. His Israel advertising firm Gitam represents several of Israel's top ten companies, including Teva, Bank Hapoalim, IDB, and Tnuva. International clients include L'Oréal, Nestlé, Sony, Pepsi, Kimberly Clark, Wrigley, Microsoft, and Nokia. He is also a business and media advisor to several Jewish billionaires including Charles Bronfman, Canada Gerry Schwartz, Pierre Besnainou of France, Russia - Israel Arkadi Gaydamak, Los Angeles Haim Saban and Frank Lowy from Australia.
