= HESEG Foundation =

Canadian charitable organization

The HESEG Foundation is a charitable organization founded by Canadian CEOs Gerry Schwartz and Heather Reisman in 2005 to provide scholarships for post-secondary education to former lone soldiers who have completed their service in the Israel Defense Forces.

HESEG awards scholarships to several different categories of former soldiers, the largest of which (based on dollars awarded) are former lone soldiers. Lone soldiers are individuals that serve in the IDF that, for one reason or another, have no family in Israel to support them. Many of them have suffered traumas in their lives and have no local support system or assistance. HESEG receives approximately 900 applications each year in this category and awards approximately 70 scholarships.

Approximately 6,000 "lone soldiers" serve in the IDF in any one year.

In 2006, HESEG donated 100 mobile air conditioning units to provide relief for residents of northern Israel forced to live in bomb shelters during the 2006 Lebanon War.

Heseg is the Hebrew word for "achievement".

== Criticism ==
Schwartz and Reisman's role in the foundation has led pro-Palestinian activists to organize a boycott campaign of the Chapters and Indigo book chain (Chapters/Indigo).

In light of the Gaza war, criticism of the IDF has escalated in regards to its international human rights and humanitarian law record.

Critics claim HESEG violates the Foreign Enlistment Act by offering inducements to Canadians to join a foreign military service.

The Canada Revenue Agency (CRA) states that “supporting the armed forces of another country is not” charitable. Yves Engler wrote that HESEG violates CRA rules by being one of many Canadian charitable organizations that send money to the IDF.

In 2023, Indigo's flagship store in Toronto was vandalized by posters and painted slogans accusing Heather Reisman of complicity in genocide for her role in the HESEG Foundation. The arrest of the Indigo 11 resulted in four guilty pleas for mischief.

== See also ==
- Friends of the Israel Defense Forces
