= Geoffrey Hinton =

British-Canadian computer scientist (born 1947)

Geoffrey Hinton CC FRS FRSC
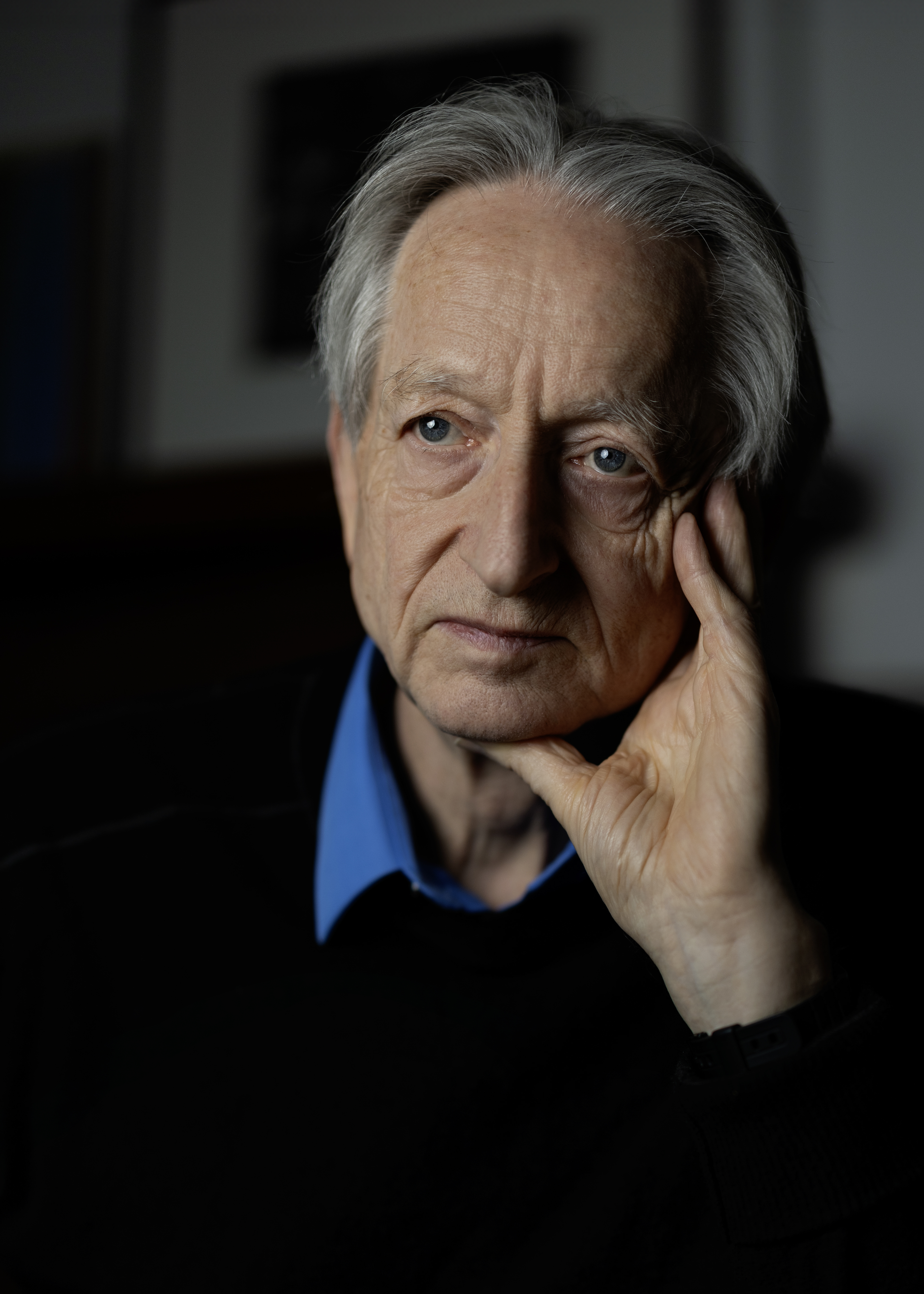
- Hinton at his home in 2026
- Born: Geoffrey Everest Hinton; 6 December 1947 (age 78); London, England, UK
- Education: King's College, Cambridge (MA); University of Edinburgh (PhD)
- Known for: Applications of backpropagation; Boltzmann machine; Restricted Boltzmann machine; Deep learning; Deep belief network; Knowledge distillation ("Dark knowledge"); Capsule neural networks; Mixture of experts; Product of experts; Time delay neural network; t-SNE; AlexNet; Dropout
- Spouses: Joanne; Rosalind Zalin (died 1994); Jacqueline Ford (m. 1997; died 2018)
- Father: H. E. Hinton
- Relatives: Colin Clark (uncle); George Boole (great-great-grandfather); Mary Everest Boole (great-great-grandmother); George Everest (great-great-granduncle); Joan Hinton (cousin)
- Awards: Rumelhart Prize (2001); Turing Award (2018); Dickson Prize (2021); Princess of Asturias Award (2022); Nobel Prize in Physics (2024); VinFuture Prize (2024); Queen Elizabeth Prize for Engineering (2025); Sandford Fleming Medal (2025)
- Scientific career
- Fields: Machine learning; Psychology; Artificial intelligence; Cognitive science; Computer science
- Workplaces: University of Toronto; Google; Carnegie Mellon University; University College London; University of California, San Diego
- Thesis: Relaxation and Its Role in Vision (1977)
- Doctoral advisor: Christopher Longuet-Higgins
- Doctoral students: Richard Zemel; Brendan Frey; Radford M. Neal; Yee Whye Teh; Ruslan Salakhutdinov; Ilya Sutskever; Alex Krizhevsky; Peter Brown
- Other notable students: Yann LeCun; Peter Dayan; Max Welling; Zoubin Ghahramani; Alex Graves
- Website: Official website

Geoffrey Everest Hinton (born 6 December 1947) is a British-Canadian computer scientist, cognitive scientist, cognitive psychologist and Nobel Prize laureate known for his work on artificial neural networks, which earned him the title "the Godfather of AI". He is University Professor Emeritus at the University of Toronto.

From 2013 to 2023, Hinton divided his time working for Google Brain and the University of Toronto before publicly announcing his departure from Google in May 2023, citing concerns about the many risks of artificial intelligence (AI) technology. In 2017, he co-founded and became the chief scientific advisor of the Vector Institute in Toronto. He is also a strategic advisor to the Schwartz Reisman Institute for Technology and Society.

With David Rumelhart and Ronald J. Williams, Hinton co-authored a highly cited paper published in 1986 that popularised the backpropagation algorithm for training multi-layer neural networks, although they were not the first to propose the approach. Hinton is viewed as a leading figure in the deep learning community. The image-recognition neural network AlexNet, designed in collaboration with his students Alex Krizhevsky and Ilya Sutskever, won the ImageNet challenge in 2012 and was a breakthrough in computer vision.

Hinton received the 2018 Turing Award, together with Yoshua Bengio and Yann LeCun, for their work on deep learning. They are sometimes referred to as the "Godfathers of Deep Learning". He was also awarded, along with John Hopfield, the 2024 Nobel Prize in Physics for "foundational discoveries and inventions that enable machine learning with artificial neural networks".

In May 2023, Hinton announced his resignation from Google to be able to "freely speak out about the risks of AI". He has voiced concerns about deliberate misuse by malicious actors, technological unemployment, and existential risk from artificial general intelligence. He noted that establishing safety guidelines will require cooperation among those competing in use of AI in order to avoid the worst outcomes. After receiving the Nobel Prize, he called for urgent research into AI safety to figure out how to control AI systems smarter than humans.

== Education ==
Hinton was born on 6 December 1947 in Wimbledon, England and was educated at Clifton College in Bristol. In 1967, he matriculated as an undergraduate student at King's College, Cambridge and, after switching between different fields including natural sciences, history of art, and philosophy, eventually graduated with a Bachelor of Arts in experimental psychology in 1970. He spent a year as a carpentry apprentice before returning to academic studies. From 1972 to 1975, he continued his study at the University of Edinburgh, where he was awarded a PhD in artificial intelligence in 1978 for research supervised by Christopher Longuet-Higgins, who favoured the symbolic AI approach over the neural network approach.

== Career ==
After his PhD, Hinton initially worked at the University of Sussex and at the MRC Applied Psychology Unit. After having difficulty getting funding in Britain, he worked in the US at the University of California, San Diego, and Carnegie Mellon University. He was the founding director of the Gatsby Charitable Foundation Computational Neuroscience Unit at University College London. He is currently University Professor Emeritus in the Department of Computer Science at the University of Toronto, where he has been affiliated since 1987, except for his time at University College London from 1998 to 2001.

Upon arrival in Canada, Geoffrey Hinton was appointed at the Canadian Institute for Advanced Research (CIFAR) in 1987 as a Fellow in CIFAR's first research program, Artificial Intelligence, Robotics & Society. In 2004, Hinton and collaborators successfully proposed the launch of a new program at CIFAR, "Neural Computation and Adaptive Perception" (NCAP), which today is named "Learning in Machines & Brains". Hinton would go on to lead NCAP for ten years. Among the members of the program are Yoshua Bengio and Yann LeCun, with whom Hinton would go on to win the ACM A.M. Turing Award in 2018. All three Turing winners continue to be members of the CIFAR Learning in Machines & Brains program.

Hinton taught a free online course on Neural Networks on the education platform Coursera in 2012. He co-founded DNNresearch Inc. in 2012 with his two graduate students, Alex Krizhevsky and Ilya Sutskever, at the University of Toronto's department of computer science. In March 2013, Google acquired DNNresearch Inc. for $44 million, and Hinton planned to "divide his time between his university research and his work at Google".

In May 2023, Hinton publicly announced his resignation from Google. He explained his decision, saying he wanted to freely speak out about the risks of AI and added that part of him now regrets his life's work.

Notable former PhD students and postdoctoral researchers from his group include Peter Dayan, Sam Roweis, Max Welling, Richard Zemel, Brendan Frey, Radford M. Neal, Yee Whye Teh, Ruslan Salakhutdinov, Ilya Sutskever, Yann LeCun, Alex Graves, Zoubin Ghahramani, and Peter Fitzhugh Brown.

== Research ==
Hinton's research concerns the use of neural networks for machine learning, memory, perception, and symbol processing. He has written or co-written more than 200 peer-reviewed publications.

In the 1980s, Hinton was part of the "Parallel Distributed Processing" group at Carnegie Mellon University, which included notable scientists like Terrence Sejnowski, Francis Crick, David Rumelhart, and James McClelland. This group favoured the connectionist approach during the AI winter. Their findings were published in a two-volume set. The connectionist approach adopted by Hinton suggests that capabilities in areas like logic and grammar can be encoded into the parameters of neural networks, and that neural networks can learn them from data. Symbolists on the other side advocated for explicitly programming knowledge and rules into AI systems.

In 1985, Hinton co-invented Boltzmann machines with David Ackley and Terry Sejnowski. His other contributions to neural network research include distributed representations, time delay neural network, mixtures of experts, Helmholtz machines and product of experts. An accessible introduction to Geoffrey Hinton's research can be found in his articles in Scientific American in September 1992 and October 1993. In 1995, Hinton and colleagues proposed the wake-sleep algorithm, involving a neural network with separate pathways for recognition and generation, being trained with alternating "wake" and "sleep" phases. In 2007, Hinton coauthored an unsupervised learning paper titled Unsupervised learning of image transformations. In 2008, he developed the visualization method t-SNE with Laurens van der Maaten. While Hinton was a postdoc at UC San Diego, David Rumelhart, Hinton and Ronald J. Williams applied the backpropagation algorithm to multi-layer neural networks. Their experiments showed that such networks can learn useful internal representations of data. In a 2018 interview, Hinton said that "David Rumelhart came up with the basic idea of backpropagation, so it's his invention." Although this work was important in popularising backpropagation, it was not the first to suggest the approach. Reverse-mode automatic differentiation, of which backpropagation is a special case, was proposed by Seppo Linnainmaa in 1970, and Paul Werbos proposed to use it to train neural networks in 1974.

In 2017, Hinton co-authored two open-access research papers about capsule neural networks, extending the concept of "capsule" introduced by Hinton in 2011. The architecture aims to better model part-whole relationships within objects in visual data. In 2021, Hinton presented GLOM, a speculative architecture idea also aiming to improve image understanding by modeling part-whole relationships in neural networks. In 2021, Hinton co-authored a widely cited paper proposing a framework for contrastive learning in computer vision. The technique involves pulling together representations of augmented versions of the same image, and pushing apart dissimilar representations.

At the 2022 Conference on Neural Information Processing Systems (NeurIPS), Hinton introduced a new learning algorithm for neural networks that he calls the "Forward-Forward" algorithm. The idea is to replace the traditional forward-backwards passes of backpropagation with two forward passes, one with positive (i.e. real) data and the other with negative data that could be generated solely by the network. The Forward-Forward algorithm is well-suited for what Hinton calls "mortal computation", where the knowledge learned is not transferable to other systems and thus dies with the hardware, as can be the case for certain analog computers used for machine learning.

== Honours and awards ==
Hinton is a Fellow of the US Association for the Advancement of Artificial Intelligence (FAAAI) since 1990. He was elected a Fellow of the Royal Society of Canada (FRSC) in 1996, and then a Fellow of the Royal Society of London (FRS) in 1998. He was the first winner of the Rumelhart Prize in 2001. According to the Royal Society:

Geoffrey Hinton is distinguished for his work on artificial neural nets, especially how they can be designed to learn without the aid of a human teacher. This may well be the start of autonomous intelligent brain-like machines. He has compared effects of brain damage with effects of losses in such a net, and found striking similarities with human impairment, such as for recognition of names and losses of categorisation. His work includes studies of mental imagery, and inventing puzzles for testing originality and creative intelligence.

In 2001, Hinton was awarded an honorary Doctor of Science (DSc) degree from the University of Edinburgh. He was awarded as International Honorary Member of the American Academy of Arts and Sciences in 2003. Also, in this year he was elected a Fellow of the US Cognitive Science Society. He was the 2005 recipient of the IJCAI Award for Research Excellence lifetime-achievement award. He was awarded the 2011 Herzberg Canada Gold Medal for Science and Engineering. In that same year, he also was awarded an honorary DSc degree from the University of Sussex In 2012, he received the Canada Council Killam Prize in Engineering. In 2013, he was awarded an honorary doctorate from the Université de Sherbrooke. Hinton was elected an Honorary Foreign Member of the Spanish Royal Academy of Engineering in 2015.

In 2016, Hinton was elected an International Member of the US National Academy of Engineering "for contributions to the theory and practice of artificial neural networks and their application to speech recognition and computer vision". He received the 2016 IEEE/RSE Wolfson James Clerk Maxwell Award. In 2016, he furthermore won the BBVA Foundation Frontiers of Knowledge Award in the Information and Communication Technologies category, "for his pioneering and highly influential work" to endow machines with the ability to learn.

Together with Yann LeCun and Yoshua Bengio, Hinton won the 2018 Turing Award for conceptual and engineering breakthroughs that have made deep neural networks a critical component of computing. They have continued to give public talks together. Also in 2018, he became a Companion of the Order of Canada (CC). In 2021, he received the Dickson Prize in Science from the Carnegie Mellon University and in 2022 the Princess of Asturias Award in the Scientific Research category, along with Yann LeCun, Yoshua Bengio, and Demis Hassabis. In the same year, Hinton received an Honorary DSc degree from the University of Toronto. In 2023, he was named an ACM Fellow, elected an International Member of the US National Academy of Sciences, and received Lifeboat Foundation's 2023 Guardian Award along with Ilya Sutskever.

Hinton and John Hopfield at the 2024 Nobel Lectures

In 2024, he was jointly awarded the Nobel Prize in Physics with John Hopfield "for foundational discoveries and inventions that enable machine learning with artificial neural networks". His development of the Boltzmann machine was explicitly mentioned in the citation. When the New York Times reporter Cade Metz asked Hinton to explain in simpler terms how the Boltzmann machine could "pretrain" backpropagation networks, Hinton quipped that Richard Feynman reportedly said: "Listen, buddy, if I could explain it in a couple of minutes, it wouldn't be worth the Nobel Prize." That same year, he received the VinFuture Prize grand award alongside Yoshua Bengio, Yann LeCun, Jen-Hsun Huang, and Fei-Fei Li for groundbreaking contributions to neural networks and deep learning algorithms.

German AI researcher Jürgen Schmidhuber contended that Hinton and others in the field did not appropriately credit existing research, and argued that foundational work by Paul Werbos and Shun-Ichi Amari in the 1970s on backpropagation and neural networks was insufficiently acknowledged.

In 2025 he was awarded the Queen Elizabeth Prize for Engineering jointly with Yoshua Bengio, Bill Dally, John Hopfield, Yann LeCun, Jen-Hsun Huang and Fei-Fei Li. He was also awarded the King Charles III Coronation Medal. In 2025, he was also named the recipient of the Sandford Fleming Medal, awarded by the Royal Canadian Institute for Science for excellence in science communication. He received an honorary Doctor of Science degree from Harvard University in 2026.

== Views ==
=== Risks of artificial intelligence ===
External videos
- Geoffrey Hinton shares his thoughts on AI's benefits and dangers, 60 Minutes YouTube video

In 2023, Hinton expressed concerns about the rapid progress of AI. He had previously believed that artificial general intelligence (AGI) was "30 to 50 years or even longer away". However, in a March 2023 interview with CBS, he said that "general-purpose AI" might be fewer than 20 years away and could bring about changes "comparable in scale with the industrial revolution or electricity".

In an interview with The New York Times published on 1 May 2023, Hinton announced his resignation from Google so he could "talk about the dangers of AI without considering how this impacts Google." He noted that a part of him now regrets his life's work.

In early May 2023, Hinton said in an interview with the BBC that AI might soon surpass the information capacity of the human brain. He described some of the risks posed by these chatbots as "quite scary". Hinton explained that chatbots can learn independently and share knowledge, so that whenever one copy acquires new information, it is automatically disseminated to the entire group, allowing AI chatbots to accumulate knowledge far beyond the capacity of any individual. In 2025, he said "My greatest fear is that, in the long run, it'll turn out that these kind of digital beings we're creating are just a better form of intelligence than people. […] We'd no longer be needed. […] If you want to know how it's like not to be the apex intelligence, ask a chicken.

==== Existential risk from AGI ====
Hinton has expressed concerns about the possibility of an AI takeover, stating that "it's not inconceivable" that AI could "wipe out humanity". Hinton said in 2023 that AI systems capable of intelligent agency would be useful for military or economic purposes. He worries that generally intelligent AI systems could "create sub-goals" that are unaligned with their programmers' interests. He says that AI systems may become power-seeking or prevent themselves from being shut off, not because programmers intended them to, but because those sub-goals are useful for achieving later goals. In particular, Hinton says "we have to think hard about how to control" AI systems capable of self-improvement. He speaks about this issue in the 2026 documentary Musk.

==== Catastrophic misuse ====
Hinton reports concerns about deliberate misuse of AI by malicious actors, stating that "it is hard to see how you can prevent the bad actors from using [AI] for bad things." In 2017, Hinton called for an international ban on lethal autonomous weapons. In 2025, in an interview, Hinton cited the use of AI by bad actors to create lethal viruses one of the greatest existential threats posed in the short term. "It just requires one crazy guy with a grudge...you can now create new viruses relatively cheaply using AI. And you don't need to be a very skilled molecular biologist to do it."

==== Economic impacts ====
Hinton was previously optimistic about the economic effects of AI, noting in 2018 that: "The phrase 'artificial general intelligence' carries with it the implication that this sort of single robot is suddenly going to be smarter than you. I don't think it's going to be that. I think more and more of the routine things we do are going to be replaced by AI systems." Hinton had also argued that AGI would not make humans redundant: "[AI in the future is] going to know a lot about what you're probably going to want to do... But it's not going to replace you."

In 2023, however, Hinton became "worried that AI technologies will in time upend the job market" and take away more than just "drudge work". He said in 2024 that the British government would have to establish a universal basic income to deal with the impact of AI on inequality. In Hinton's view, AI will boost productivity and generate more wealth. But unless the government intervenes, it will only make the rich richer and hurt the people who might lose their jobs. "That's going to be very bad for society", he said.

In December 2024, he had become somewhat more pessimistic, saying there was a "10 to 20 per cent chance" that AI would cause human extinction within the next three decades (he had previously suggested a 10% chance, without a timescale). He expressed surprise at the speed with which AI was advancing, and said that most experts expected AI to advance, probably in the next 20 years, to be "smarter than people ... a scary thought. ... So just leaving it to the profit motive of large companies is not going to be sufficient to make sure they develop it safely. The only thing that can force those big companies to do more research on safety is government regulation." Fellow "godfather of AI" and chief Meta scientist Yann LeCun disagreed, saying AI "could actually save humanity from extinction".

=== Politics ===
Hinton is a socialist. He moved from the US to Canada in part due to disillusionment with Ronald Reagan–era politics and disapproval of military funding of artificial intelligence.

In August 2024, Hinton co-authored a letter with Yoshua Bengio, Stuart Russell, and Lawrence Lessig in support of SB 1047, a California AI safety bill that would require companies training models which cost more than US$100 million to perform risk assessments before deployment. They said the legislation was the "bare minimum for effective regulation of this technology".

In an October 2026 interview with The Guardian, Hinton called US president Donald Trump "a corrupt, senile felon" who understands "almost nothing" about AI.

== Personal life ==
Hinton's first wife, Rosalind Zalin, died of ovarian cancer in 1994; his second wife, Jacqueline "Jackie" Ford, died of pancreatic cancer in 2018.

Hinton is the great-great-grandson of the mathematician and educator Mary Everest Boole and her husband, the logician George Boole. George Boole's work eventually became one of the foundations of modern computer science. Another great-great-grandfather of his was the surgeon and author James Hinton, who was the father of the mathematician Charles Howard Hinton.

Hinton's father was the entomologist Howard Hinton. His middle name comes from another relative, George Everest, the Surveyor General of India after whom the mountain is named. He is the nephew of the economist Colin Clark, and nuclear physicist Joan Hinton, one of the two female physicists at the Manhattan Project, was his first cousin once removed.

He injured his back at age 19, which makes sitting painful. He has dealt with depression throughout his life.

Hinton has been an atheist since childhood.
