= Indigo Books and Music =

Canadian book and gift retailer

Indigo Books & Music Inc.
- Type: Private
- Industry: Bookselling
- Founded: 1996; 30 years ago
- Founder: Heather Reisman
- Headquarters: Toronto, Ontario, Canada
- Number of locations: 66 (Indigo); 20 (Chapters); 56 (Coles); 15 (IndigoSpirit)
- Key people: Heather Reisman (CEO); Hugues Simard (CFO)
- Revenue: ▲$1.079 billion CDN (2017)
- Operating income: ▲$25 million CDN (2017)
- Net income: ▼$21.8 million CDN (2017)
- Total assets: ▲$633.6 million CDN (2017)
- Owner: Gerry Schwartz(Controlling Shareholder)
- Number of employees: 7,000 (2017),
- Divisions: Chapters; Coles Books !ndigoSpirit !ndigokids !ndigotech
- Website: indigo.ca

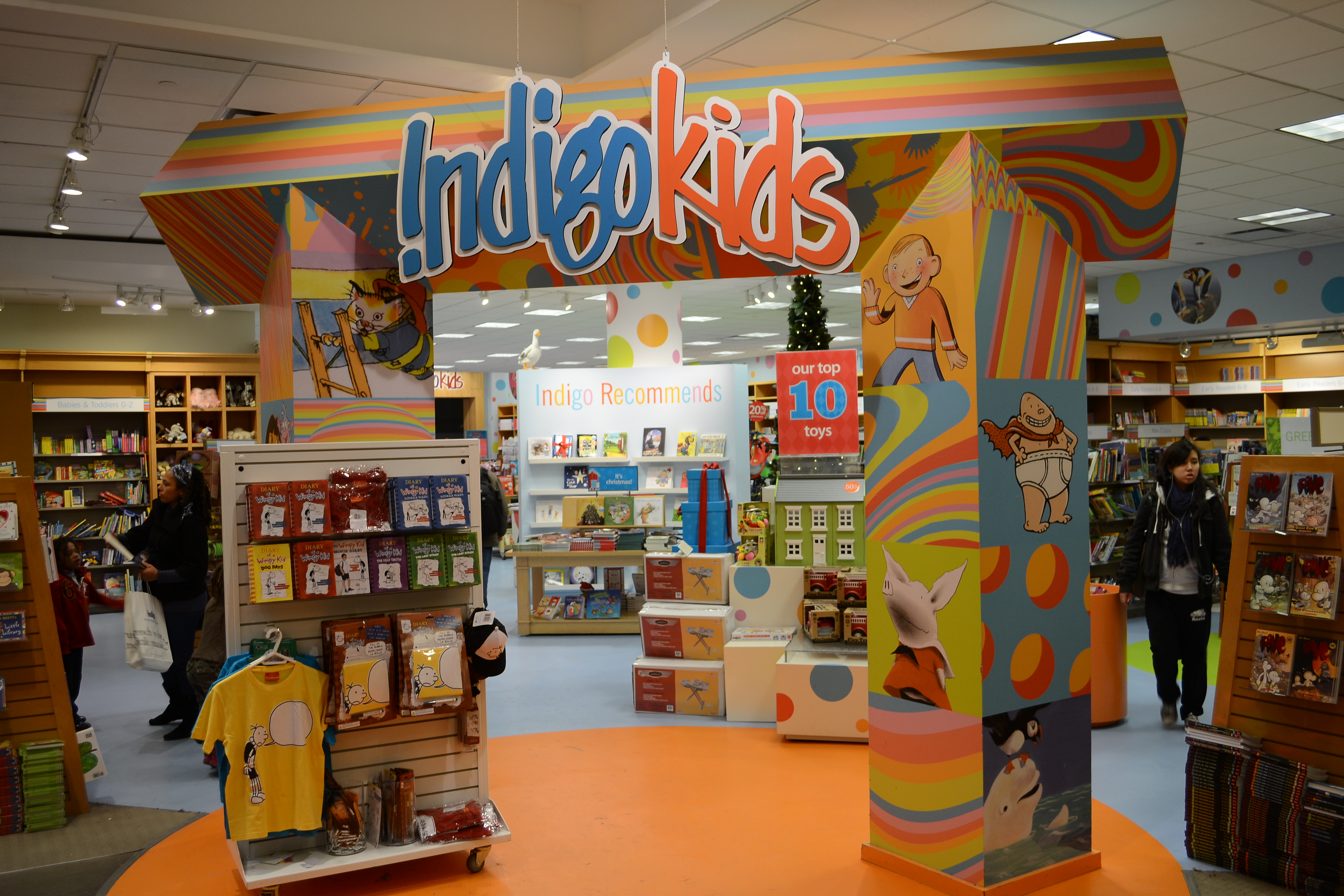
Indigo Kids, Indigo Eaton Centre in December 2010

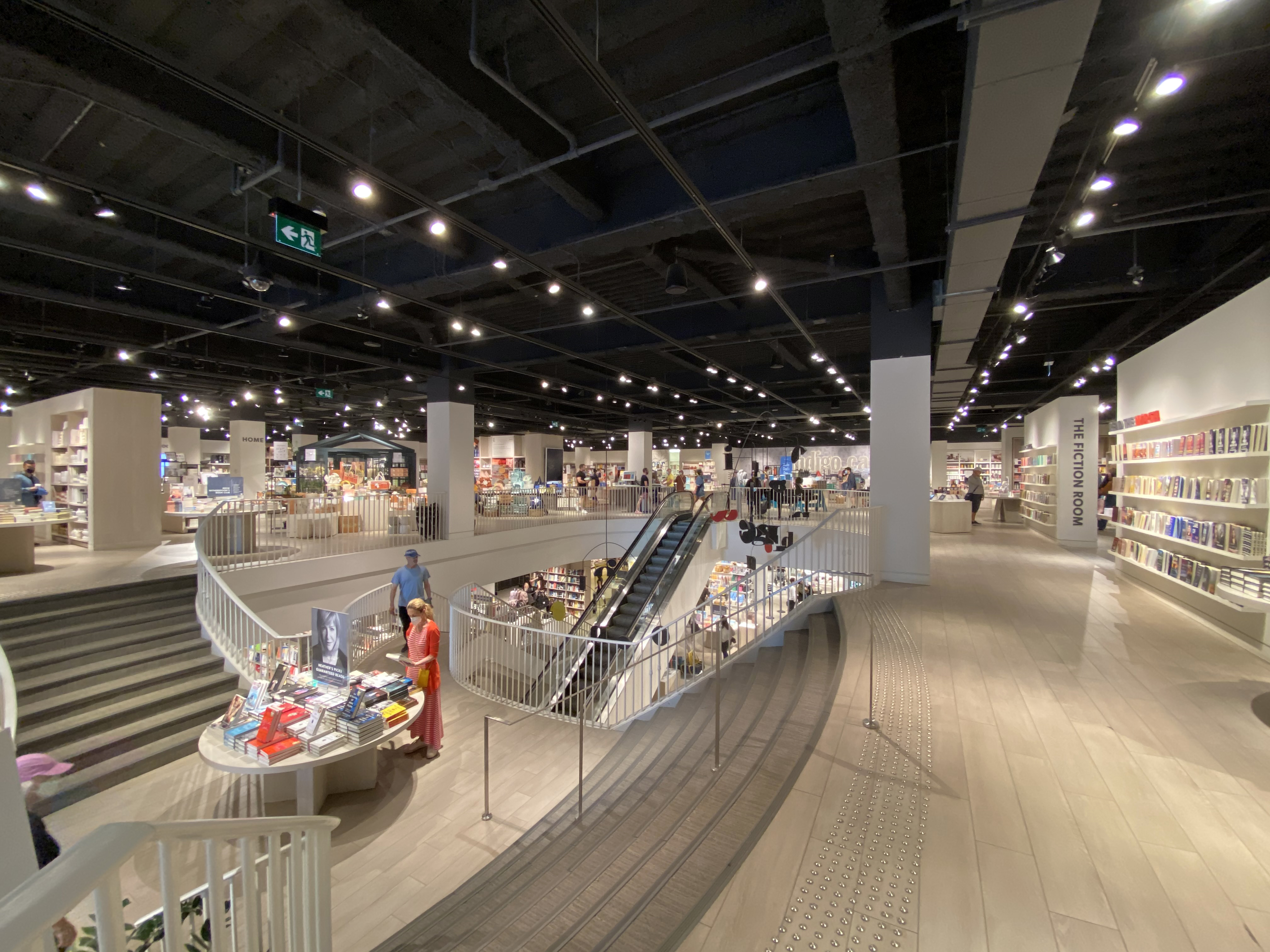
Indigo flagship store at Manulife Centre, Toronto

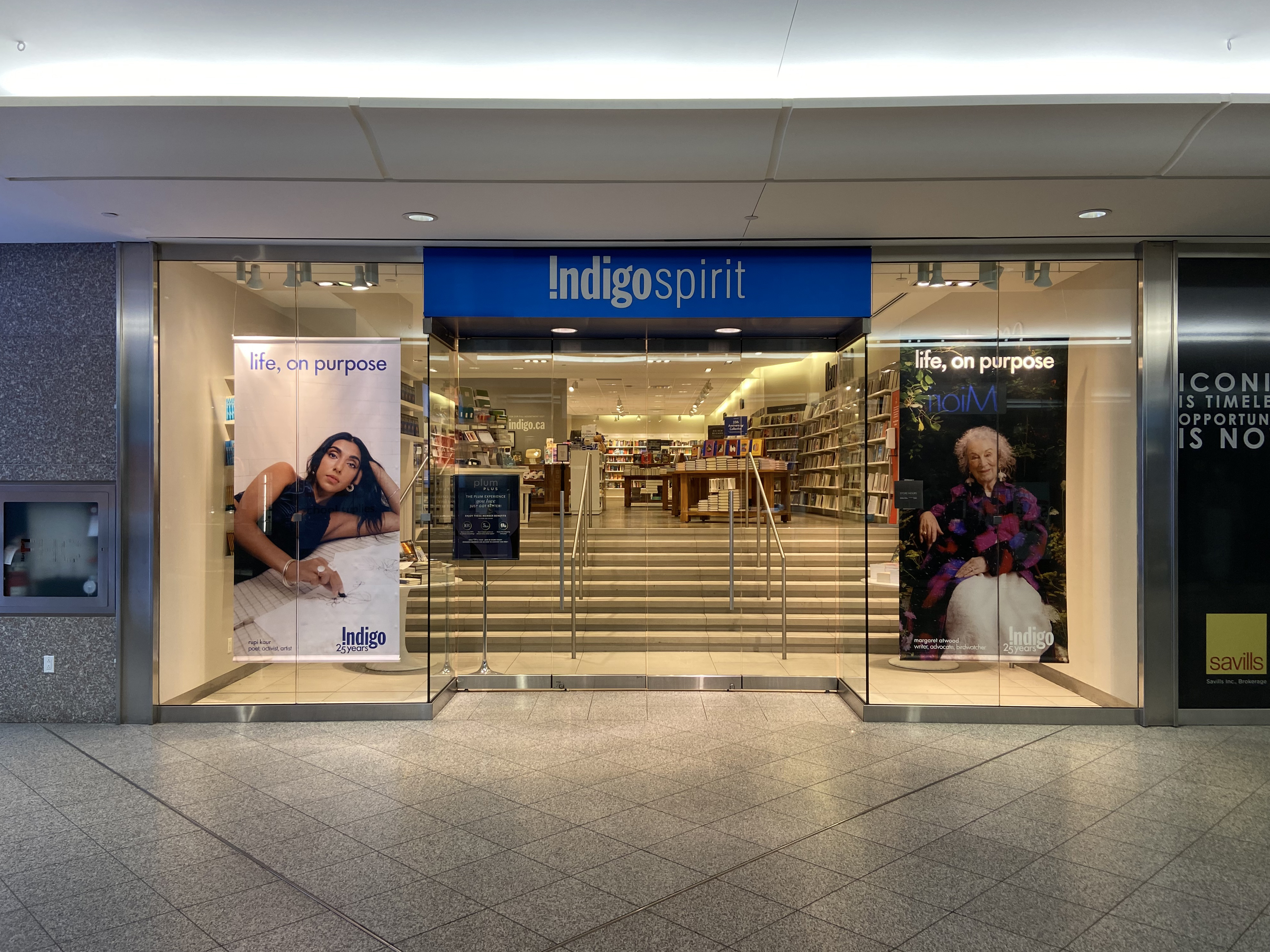
Indigospirit, Royal Bank Plaza, Toronto

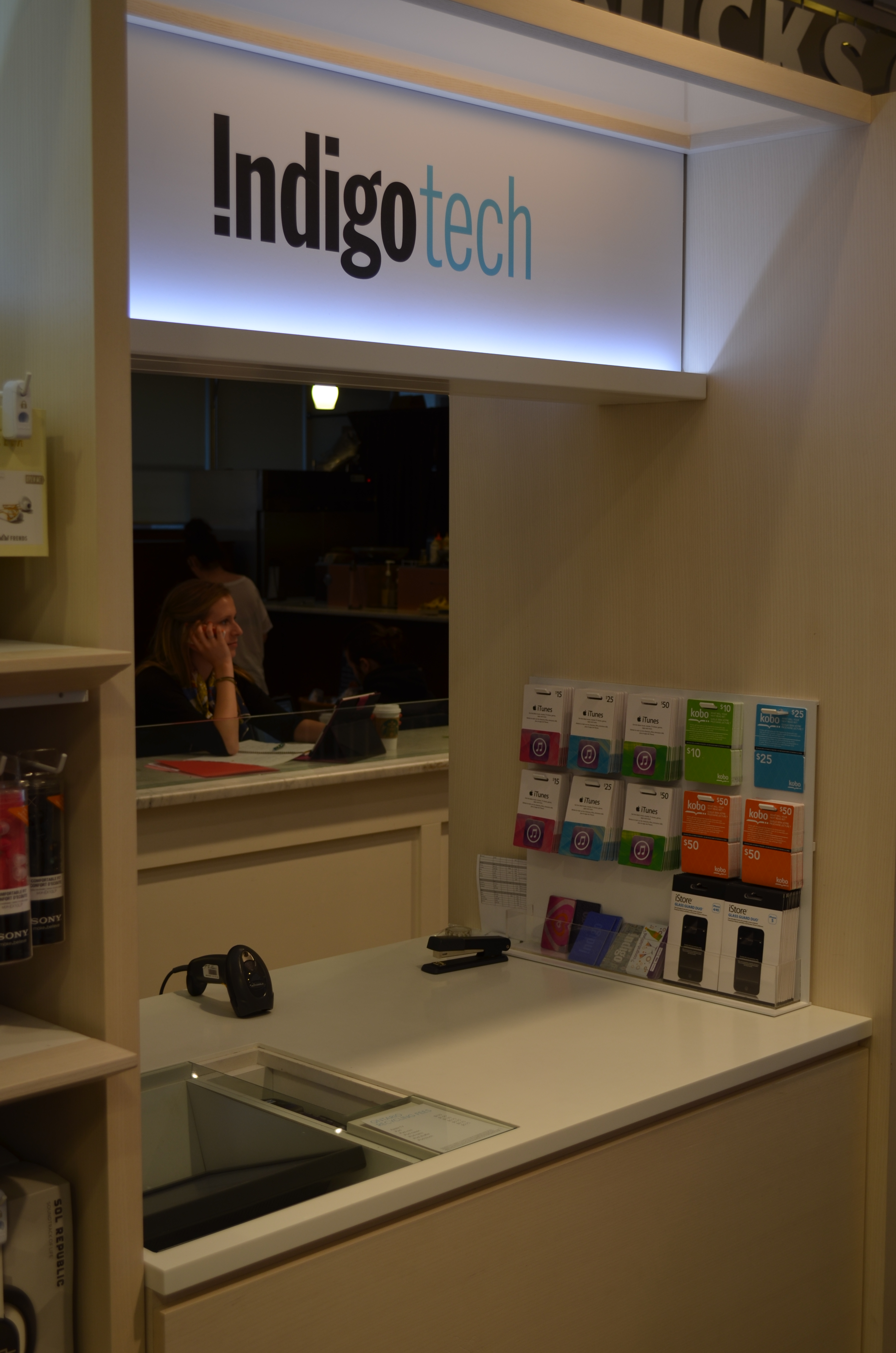
IndigoTech at the Eaton Centre Indigo Store in April 2014

Indigo Books & Music Inc. is a Canadian bookstore chain. Indigo operates stores in all ten provinces and one territory, and through a website offering a selection of books, toys, home décor, stationery, and gifts. It is Canada's largest book, gift, and specialty toy retailer. As of 2022, Indigo has started selling music (vinyl, CDs), and select audio equipment (headphones, turntables).

At the end of its fiscal year in March 2018, the company reported a record annual revenue surpassing CAD $1 billion. As of July 1, 2017, the company operated 86 superstores under the banners Chapters and Indigo and 123 small format stores, under the banners Coles, Indigospirit, and The Book Company. Indigo is headquartered in Toronto, Ontario and employed more than 7,000 people throughout Canada.

After a series of mergers and acquisitions in the Canadian bookstore industry, Indigo stands as Canada's last remaining national bookstore chain. In late 2017, announcements were made to expand to the United States, starting with a location in The Mall at Short Hills in Millburn, New Jersey.

== History ==
The company was founded in 1996 by Heather Reisman, who is married to Gerry Schwartz, majority owner and CEO of Onex Corporation.

The company's first big-box bookstore initially called "Indigo Books, Music & More", was opened in Burlington, Ontario on September 4, 1997. With financing from Onex Corporation, Indigo bought Chapters, their largest Canadian competitor, in 2001 and continues to operate many stores under the Chapters banner. Indigo also gained the ownership of the Coles chain of small-format bookstores, which was also owned by Chapters.

Indigo closed three high-profile stores in Toronto in the spring of 2014, including the World's Biggest Bookstore, which it acquired when it bought Chapters. In June 2014, Reisman said the company was headed into a new phase, selling a much higher percentage of non-book items.

In late 2017, it was announced that it would expand to the United States, with its first location opening in The Mall at Short Hills in October 2018.

In September 2022, Reisman stepped down as CEO and became executive chair, with Peter Ruis being named CEO.

In February 2023, Indigo was the victim of a ransomware attack that rendered them unable to process non-cash transactions, returns, and gift cards for approximately four days. They got back their card transactions through a wireless pinpad, but the rewards system was still down. Online shopping remained unavailable for almost two months. While Indigo has assured the public that customer data was not compromised, they notified current and former employees that employee data had been. LockBit has claimed responsibility for the attack. Indigo made the decision not to pay the ransom due to the possibility that the money would be used to fund terrorism or organized crime.

In June 2023, Reisman announced her retirement, effective August 22, 2023. This came after four out of ten board members stepped down, citing loss of confidence and mistreatment from the board leadership.

In September 2023, founder Heather Reisman returned as chief executive officer, after Peter Ruis abruptly resigned earlier in the month.

In November 2023, Indigo's flagship store in Toronto was vandalized by posters and painted slogans accusing Reisman of raising funds for the Israeli military. The arrest of the Indigo 11 resulted in four guilty pleas for mischief.

In May 2024, Indigo's shareholders approved a deal to take the company private for $2.50 a share, the deal closed on May 31 and the stock was delisted from the TSX on June 4th.

In August 2024, Indigo served a cease and desist letter to the pro-Palestinian activist group Indigo Kills Kids. Demands in the letter included that the group stop infringing intellectual property laws, remove "false and defamatory content," and stop interfering with the business and reputation of Indigo. On September 17, 2024, the Federal Court of Canada granted interim emergency approval to a lawsuit from Indigo requesting internet service providers take down the organization's website.

== Operations ==
The company sells books, magazines, gifts, and toys through its website and in its stores. Its banners currently include Indigo Books & Music, Chapters, Coles, SmithBooks, IndigoSpirit, and The Book Company (small format).

Indigo began a partnership with Apple and iUniverse publishing in the 2010s. Indigo also manufactures its own brand of products, called IndigoLife. In addition, the chain's Indigo Trusted Advisor Program offers book recommendations from experts in health, finance, and the environment, such as David Bach and David Suzuki.

== Charitable activities ==
In 2004, Indigo started the Indigo Love of Reading Foundation, a program that helps provide new books and learning materials to high-needs elementary schools. Indigo commits $1.5 million annually to schools across Canada.

The money is raised by Indigo itself, customers, staff, suppliers, and proceeds from Love of Reading fundraising products (i.e., gift card sleeves). Only 80% of customer donations have been granted to over 1800 schools since the Love of Reading Foundation's inception, with Indigo covering all of the operating costs of the foundation. The funding given to the schools is split across a 90% credit to spend at Indigo and 10% cash to be spent anywhere, as long as it contributes to advancement of literacy.

In addition to the regularly collected funds, the annual Adopt a School program has increased the Indigo Love of Reading Foundation's donations up to a total of CAD 26 million given to more than 3,000 school libraries in Canada since 2004. During the month-long Adopt a School program, each retail store selects a local school to be the recipient of the donations the store collects during that time period.

In 2007, the Indigo Love of Reading Foundation produced a documentary chronicling the issue of funding for books in Canadian elementary schools. The documentary Writing on the Wall recounts the establishment of the foundation, while revealing the current conditions of school libraries and literacy in Canada. A follow-up documentary was created in 2017 titled "Read Between the Lines".

== Rakuten Kobo ==
Rakuten Kobo, an e-reader platform and manufacturer, was founded and spun off of Indigo in November 2009. By August 2011, the Kobo e-reading platform had become the dominant player in Canada, with research firm Ipsos Reid estimating that it represented 36% of the Canadian market as of that date.

In November 2011, Japanese e-commerce company Rakuten purchased the company for US$315 million in cash. Around 58% of Kobo was owned by Indigo at the time of the purchase.

== Employee programs ==
Indigo was listed as one of Canada's Top 20 Employer Brands in the 2018 survey by Randstad NV. This is due in part to staff rewards program which includes benefits eligibility for both full-time and part-time employees. Indigo also offers a company-matched RRSP program and yearly employee scholarships.

== Criticism and controversies ==
=== Charity scandal ===
CBC Marketplace showed that Indigo is doubly profiting from its own charity "Love of Reading Foundation": the charity forced schools to buy books only from Indigo at full retail price. Other vendors usually sell to charities at wholesale price. Then, the charity used the profits to get charity tax refund for the donation to its own charity. Based on data provided by the CBC documentary, the profits obtained is almost equal to the charity it gives if the tax refunds is taken into account.

=== Product removal ===
In 2001, Indigo removed Adolf Hitler's Mein Kampf from the shelves. In 2006, Indigo decided not to sell the June issue of Harper's Magazine, which reprinted the controversial cartoons of the Muslim prophet Muhammad that had led to violent demonstrations around the world. Indigo also did not distribute the issue of Western Standard which reprinted and discussed those same cartoons. The company has also reportedly refused to stock several titles by David Icke, and firearms magazines.

=== Competitive position ===
The Indigo/Chapters chain has been criticized over what some perceive as a virtual monopoly over retail-based book sales in Canada. In 2002, the company strongly opposed the entry of Amazon into the Canadian marketplace with accusations the U.S.-based company was skirting regulations about foreign ownership of Canadian booksellers.

Indigo's expansion has been blamed, among other factors, for the financial difficulties of some independent booksellers in Canada. In particular, its rise coincided with the bankruptcy of Lichtman's, once Canada's largest independent bookseller.

== See also ==
- Publishing
