= Radford M. Neal =

Canadian computer scientist and statistician (born 1956)

- Born: September 12, 1956 (age 70)
- Citizenship: Canadian
- Education: University of Calgary; University of Toronto
- Scientific career
- Fields: Statistics, Machine Learning, Artificial Intelligence
- Workplaces: University of Toronto
- Thesis: Bayesian Learning for Neural Networks (1995)
- Doctoral advisor: Geoffrey Hinton
- Other academic advisors: David Hill
- Website: www.cs.utoronto.ca/~radford/

Radford M. Neal (born September 12, 1956) is a professor emeritus at the Department of Statistics and Department of Computer Science at the University of Toronto, where he held a Canada research chair in statistics and machine learning.

== Education and career ==
Neal studied computer science at the University of Calgary, where he received his B.Sc. in 1977 and M.Sc. in 1980, with thesis work supervised by David Hill. He worked for several years as a sessional instructor at the University of Calgary and as a statistical consultant in the industry before coming back to the academia. Neal continued his study at the University of Toronto, where he received his Ph.D. in 1995 under the supervision of Geoffrey Hinton. Neal became an assistant professor at the University of Toronto in 1995, an associated professor in 1999 and a full professor since 2001. He was the Canada Research Chair in Statistics and Machine Learning from 2003 to 2016 and retired in 2017.

Neal has made great contributions in the area of machine learning and statistics, where he is particularly well known for his work on Markov chain Monte Carlo, error correcting codes and Bayesian learning for neural networks. He is also known for his blog and as the developer of pqR: a new version of the R interpreter.

== Bibliography ==
=== Books and chapters ===
- Neal, Radford M. (1996). Bayesian learning for neural networks. New York: Springer. ISBN 0-387-94724-8. OCLC 34894370.
- Neal, Radford M. (2011-05-10). Brooks, Steve; Gelman, Andrew; Jones, Galin; Meng, Xiao-Li (eds.). MCMC using Hamiltonian dynamics. arXiv:1206.1901. Bibcode:2011hmcm.book..113N. doi:10.1201/b10905. ISBN 9780429138508. S2CID 1048042.

=== Selected papers ===
- Witten, Ian H.; Neal, Radford M.; Cleary, John G. (1987). "Arithmetic coding for data compression". Communications of the ACM. 30 (6): 520–540. doi:10.1145/214762.214771. ISSN 0001-0782. S2CID 3343393.
- Hinton, Geoffrey E.; Dayan, Peter; Frey, Brendan J.; Neal, Radford M. (1995-05-26). "The "Wake-Sleep" Algorithm for Unsupervised Neural Networks". Science. 268 (5214): 1158–1161. Bibcode:1995Sci...268.1158H. doi:10.1126/science.7761831. ISSN 0036-8075. PMID 7761831. S2CID 871473.
- Dayan, Peter; Hinton, Geoffrey E.; Neal, Radford M.; Zemel, Richard S. (1995). "The Helmholtz Machine". Neural Computation. 7 (5): 889–904. doi:10.1162/neco.1995.7.5.889. ISSN 0899-7667. PMID 7584891. S2CID 1890561.
- Neal, Radford M. (2000). "Markov Chain Sampling Methods for Dirichlet Process Mixture Models". Journal of Computational and Graphical Statistics. 9 (2): 249–265. doi:10.2307/1390653. ISSN 1061-8600. JSTOR 1390653.
- Neal, Radford M. (2001). "Annealed importance sampling". Statistics and Computing. 11 (2): 125–139. arXiv:physics/9803008. doi:10.1023/A:1008923215028. S2CID 11112994.
- Neal, Radford M. (2003-06-01). "Slice sampling". The Annals of Statistics. 31 (3). doi:10.1214/aos/1056562461. ISSN 0090-5364.
- Jain, Sonia; Neal, Radford M. (2007-09-01). "Splitting and merging components of a nonconjugate Dirichlet process mixture model". Bayesian Analysis. 2 (3). doi:10.1214/07-BA219. ISSN 1936-0975.
- Shahbaba, Babak; Lan, Shiwei; Johnson, Wesley O.; Neal, Radford M. (2014). "Split Hamiltonian Monte Carlo". Statistics and Computing. 24 (3): 339–349. arXiv:1106.5941. doi:10.1007/s11222-012-9373-1. ISSN 0960-3174. S2CID 255067283.
