= Zoubin Ghahramani =

British-Iranian computer researcher (born 1970)

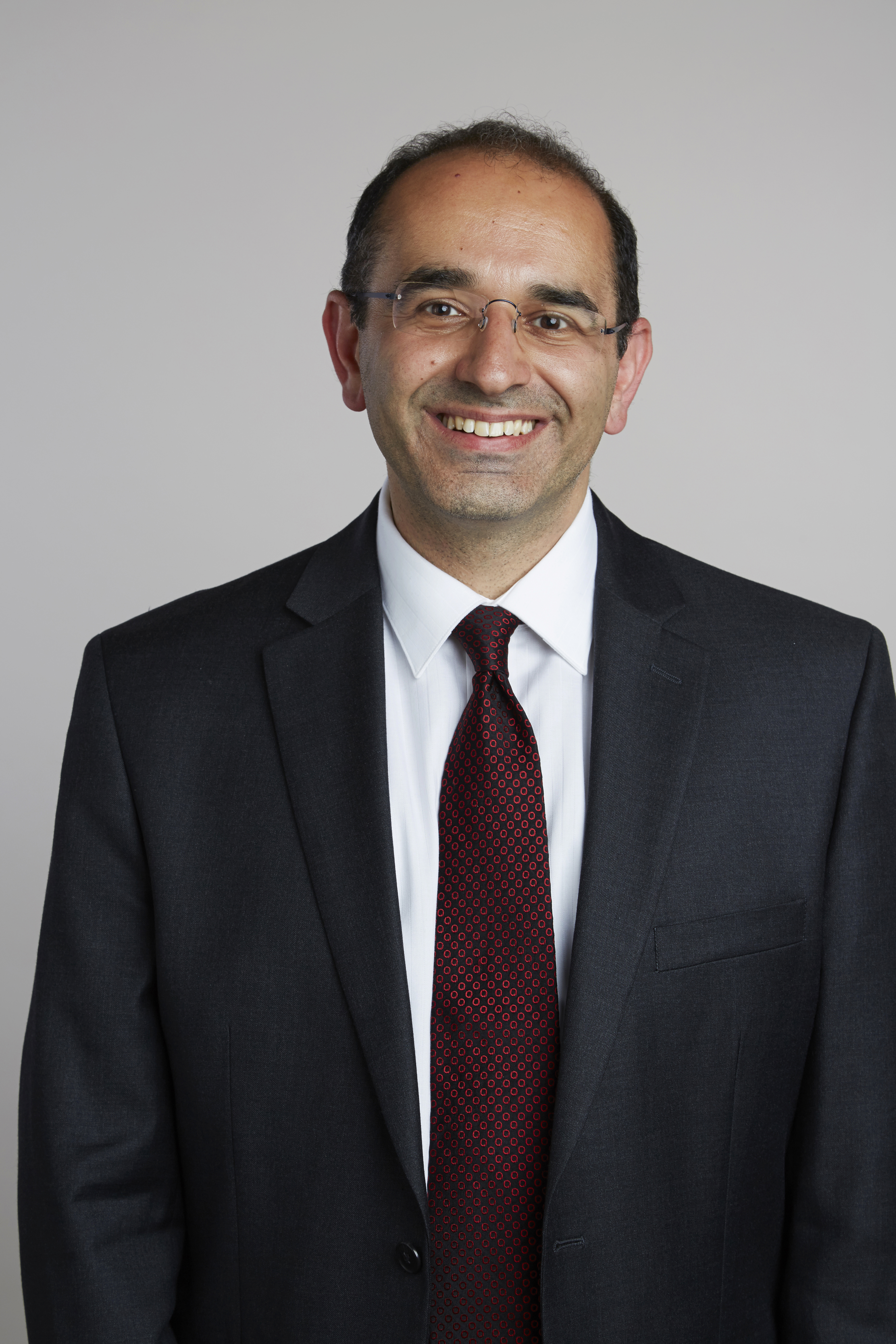
- Ghahramani in 2015, portrait from the Royal Society
- Born: 8 February 1970 (age 56); Moscow, Russian SFSR, Soviet Union
- Education: University of Pennsylvania; Massachusetts Institute of Technology
- Known for: Graphical models; Variational Bayes; Computational neuroscience
- Awards: FRS (2015)
- Scientific career
- Fields: Machine Learning; Bayesian statistics
- Workplaces: Google; University of Cambridge; Carnegie Mellon University; University College London; University of Toronto
- Thesis: Computation and Psychophysics of Sensorimotor Integration (1995)
- Doctoral advisor: Michael I. Jordan; Tomaso Poggio
- Website: mlg.eng.cam.ac.uk/zoubin/

Zoubin Ghahramani FRS (Persian: زوبین قهرمانی; born 8 February 1970) is a British-Iranian machine learning and AI researcher, Vice President of Research at Google DeepMind and Professor of Information Engineering at the University of Cambridge. He has been a Fellow of St John's College, Cambridge since 2009. He held appointments at University College London from 1998 to 2005 and was Associate Research Professor in the Machine Learning Department at Carnegie Mellon University from 2003 to 2012. He was the Chief Scientist of Uber from 2016 until 2020. He joined Google Brain in 2020 as Senior Research Director, becoming a VP of Research in 2021, and heading Google Brain until its merger with DeepMind to form Google DeepMind. He was a founding Cambridge Liaison Director of the Alan Turing Institute and also founding Deputy Director of the Leverhulme Centre for the Future of Intelligence.

Ghahramani contributed to the Royal Society's Machine Learning Report in 2017 and led the UK's Future of Compute Review, in 2023.

== Education ==
Ghahramani was educated at the American School of Madrid in Spain and the University of Pennsylvania where he was awarded a dual degree in Cognitive Science and Computer Science in 1990. He obtained his Ph.D. in Cognitive Neuroscience from the Department of Brain and Cognitive Sciences at the Massachusetts Institute of Technology, supervised by Michael I. Jordan and Tomaso Poggio.

== Research and career ==
Following his Ph.D., Ghahramani moved to the University of Toronto in 1995 as a Postdoctoral Fellow in the Artificial Intelligence Lab, working with Geoffrey Hinton. From 1998 to 2005, he was a member of the faculty at the Gatsby Computational Neuroscience Unit, University College London.

Ghahramani has made significant contributions in the areas of Bayesian machine learning (particularly variational methods for approximate Bayesian inference), as well as graphical models and computational neuroscience. His current research focuses on nonparametric Bayesian modelling and statistical machine learning. He has also worked on artificial intelligence, information retrieval, bioinformatics and statistics which provide the mathematical foundations for handling uncertainty, making decisions, and designing learning systems. He has published over 300 papers, receiving over 100,000 citations (an h-index of 132).

He co-founded Geometric Intelligence in 2014, with Gary Marcus, Doug Bemis, and Ken Stanley, which was acquired by Uber in 2016. Afterwards, he transferred to Uber's AI Labs in 2016, and later became VP of AI and Chief Scientist at Uber. In 2020 he joined Google and became VP of Research and head of Google Brain in 2021 until its merger with DeepMind in April 2023.

== Awards and honors ==
Ghahramani was elected Fellow of the Royal Society (FRS) in 2015. His certificate of election reads:

Zoubin Ghahramani is a world leader in the field of machine learning, significantly advancing the state-of-the-art in algorithms that can learn from data. He is known in particular for fundamental contributions to probabilistic modeling and Bayesian nonparametric approaches to machine learning systems, and to the development of approximate variational inference algorithms for scalable learning. He is one of the pioneers of semi-supervised learning methods, active learning algorithms, and sparse Gaussian processes. His development of novel infinite dimensional nonparametric models, such as the infinite latent feature model, has been highly influential.

He was awarded the Royal Society Milner Award in 2021 in recognition of 'his fundamental contributions to probabilistic machine learning'.
