= Richard Zemel =

Canadian-American computer scientist (born 1963)

- Born: Richard Stanley Zemel; 1963 (age 62–63)
- Education: Harvard University; University of Toronto
- Spouse: Toniann Pitassi
- Scientific career
- Fields: Mathematics, computer science
- Institutions: University of Arizona; University of Toronto; Columbia University
- Doctoral advisor: Geoffrey Hinton

Richard Stanley Zemel (born 1963) is a Canadian-American computer scientist and professor at Columbia University, Department of Computer Science, and a leading figure in the field of machine learning and computer vision.

Zemel studied the history of science at Harvard University and obtained his B.A. in 1984. He continued his study at the Department of Computer Science of the University of Toronto under the supervision of Geoffrey Hinton. He obtained his M.Sc. and Ph.D. both in computer science in 1989 and 1994, respectively.

== See also ==
- Helmholtz machine
