= Schwartz Reisman Innovation Campus =

Toronto tower complex

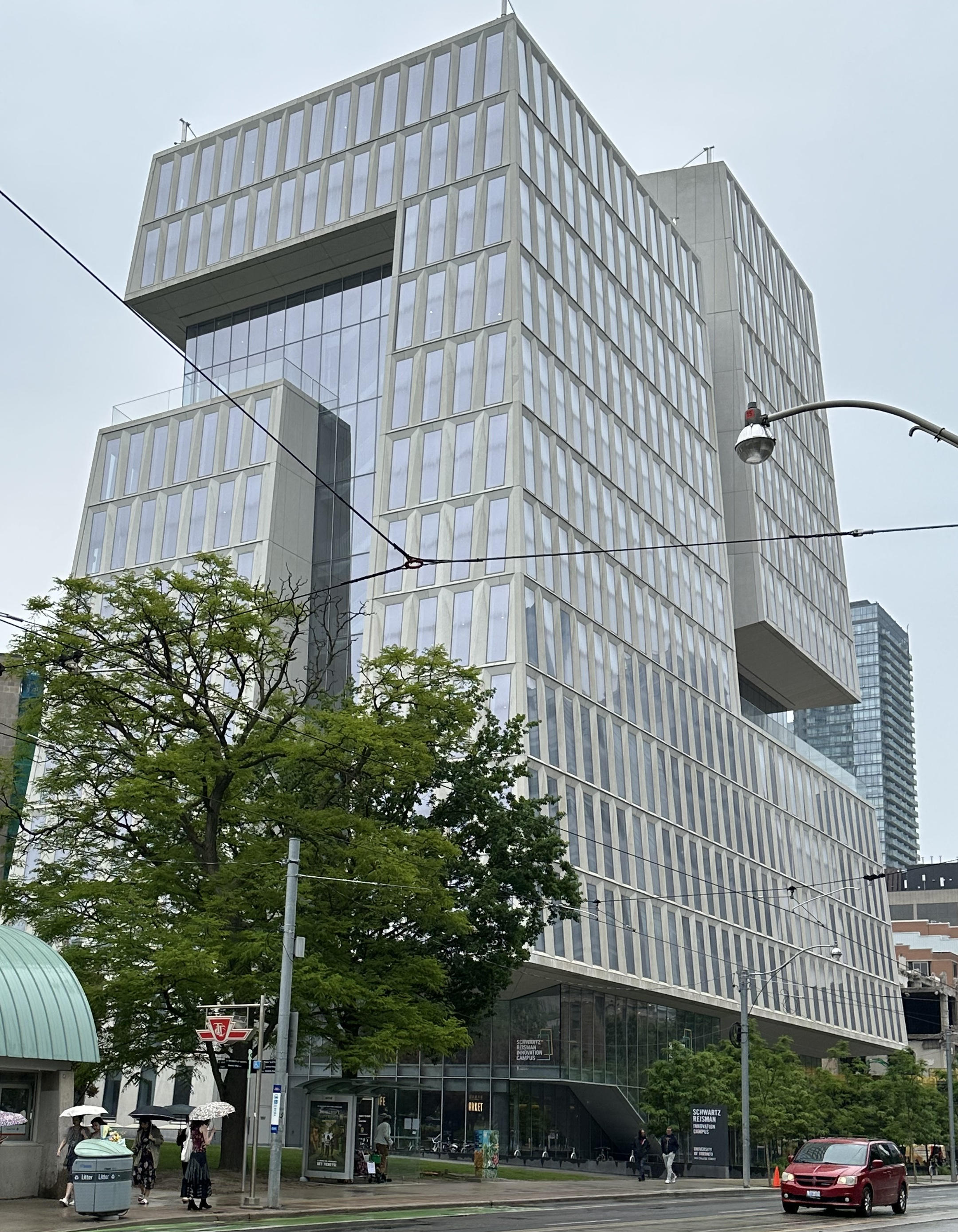
- The west tower in 2025
- Interactive map of the Schwartz Reisman Innovation Campus area

General information
- Location: 108 College Street, Toronto, Ontario, Canada
- Coordinates: 43°39′37″N 79°23′21″W
- Named for: Gerald Schwartz; Heather Reisman
- Completed: 2024 (West Tower); TBA (East Tower)
- Opening: May 2024
- Owner: University of Toronto

Technical details
- Floor count: 13 (West Tower)
- Floor area: 250,000 sq ft (West Tower)

Design and construction
- Architecture firm: Weiss/Manfredi

Other information
- Public transit: at Queen's Park

Website
- sric.utoronto.ca

The Schwartz Reisman Innovation Campus (SRIC) is a dual-tower building complex on the St. George campus of the University of Toronto in downtown Toronto, Ontario, Canada. Located at College Street and Queen's Park Crescent, its first phase, the West Tower, opened in May 2024 and consists of 250,000 square feet of space across 13 storeys.

Affiliated with the University of Toronto, the complex is dedicated to research on artificial intelligence and its impact on society, and is home to the largest collection of student and faculty-led start-ups in Canada, including the Schwartz Reisman Institute for Technology and Society, the Vector Institute, and University of Toronto Entrepreneurship.

== History ==
Following a $100 million donation from philanthropists Gerald Schwartz and Heather Reisman in March of 2019, the University of Toronto announced the plan to build a dedicated hub for entrepreneurial activity and technological advancement. The donation was the largest in U of T's history at the time.

In 2024, the first phase of construction was completed in the West Tower. Schwartz Reisman West consists of 250,000 square feet of space across 13 storeys.

The second phase, Schwartz Reisman East, is planned to contain spaces for biomedical and bioengineering research, wet labs, and facilities for life science startups and researchers. It will be a larger, 20-storey tower which will provide 500,000 square feet of space.

== Construction ==
The Schwartz Reisman Innovation Campus is located at the intersection of College Street and University Avenue near the Ontario Legislative Building, where the latter avenue turns into Queen's Park Crescent. It is situated on the southeastern end of the University of Toronto's St. George campus where it meets the northern portion of the Discovery District, across from the Leslie L. Dan Pharmacy Building and MaRS Discovery District.

It was designed by New York City–based architecture firm Weiss/Manfredi, with contributions from Teeple Architects and landscape architects DTAH. The SRIC features a series of outdoor balconies or “winter gardens” across the surface of the building. Each balcony’s height corresponds to that of a nearby structure, such as that of the Ontario Ministry of Finance.

== Tenants ==
The SRIC hosts both University of Toronto–affiliated organizations and several affiliated businesses and nonprofit organizations. Its U of T tenants include the offices for campus events, real estate partnerships, and innovations and partnerships, as well as entrepreneurship incubators such as ONRamp and its centre for entrepreneurship.

The SRIC's main tenant is the Schwartz Reisman Institute for Technology and Society, founded in 2019 as part of the $100-million donation from Schwartz and Reisman.

The complex's other partnered tenants are:

- AiNOS AI
- AXL
- Bank for International Settlements
- Black Founders Network
- Grintex
- Intrepid Growth Partners
- Kibo
- Knowledgehook
- Mitacs
- Novartis
- ProteinQure
- RootQuotient
- Technology North
- UTEST
- Validation Cloud
- Vector Institute
- YScope

== See also ==
- List of University of Toronto buildings
