= Onex Corporation =

Canadian investment company

- Type: Public
- Traded as: TSX: ONEX
- Industry: Private equity
- Founded: 1984; 42 years ago
- Founder: Gerry Schwartz
- Headquarters: Toronto, Canada
- Key people: Robert Le Blanc (CEO)
- Products: Private equity funds, investment vehicles, equity and debt strategies
- AUM: CA$47 billion (November 2022)
- Number of employees: 536
- Website: www.onex.com

Onex Corporation is a Canadian investment management firm founded by Gerry Schwartz in 1984. In November 2022, it had CAD $47 billion dollars under management.

== History ==
Schwartz founded Onex in 1984 and took the company public in 1987.

In June 2007, General Motors sold Allison Transmission to financial investors Carlyle Group and Onex Corporation.

In 2010, Onex and the Canada Pension Plan acquired English engineering firm Tomkins, though Onex only held 14% of shares.

At the end of 2017, Onex acquired SMG. The company was sold off in 2019 to merge with AEG Facilities to form ASM Global.

In 2019, Onex acquired Gluskin Sheff, a Toronto-based wealth management firm.

In December 2019, Onex purchased Canada's second-largest airline WestJet for CA$5.0 billion (equivalent to $6 billion in 2025).

In May 2020, Onex blamed a first-quarter net loss of $1.1 billion US dollars on the COVID-19 pandemic.

Founder Schwartz stepped down as CEO in May 2022 and was replaced by Bobby Le Blanc.
