= Gerry Schwartz =

Canadian founder, chairman and CEO of Onex Corporation (born 1941)

Gerry Schwartz OC
- Born: November 24, 1941 (age 84); Winnipeg, Manitoba, Canada
- Education: University of Manitoba (BA, LLB); Harvard University (MBA)
- Spouse: Heather Reisman (m. 1982)
- Children: 4

Gerald W. Schwartz, OC (born 1941) is the founder and chairman of Onex Corporation. Schwartz has a net worth of US$1.5 billion, according to Forbes magazine.

== Early life and career ==
Schwartz was born in Winnipeg, Manitoba. He graduated from Kelvin High School in Winnipeg. He received his B.A. and LL.B. degrees from the University of Manitoba where he became an active brother of the Sigma Alpha Mu fraternity. He later received an MBA degree from Harvard University in 1970.

In the 1970s, Schwartz worked at Bear Stearns, where he was mentored by Jerome Kohlberg, Jr., who later became a founding partner in Kohlberg Kravis Roberts. Schwartz left Bear Stearns by 1977, returning to Canada. Along with Izzy Asper, Schwartz co-founded CanWest Global Communications in 1977.

In 1983, Schwartz founded Onex Corporation.

Schwartz has been a director of Scotiabank since 1999. In 2021, Schwartz's net worth was estimated at US$1.5 billion, making him one of the wealthiest people in Canada. As of 2015, he was the highest paid CEO in Canada.

In May 2023, Gerald Schwartz resigned as CEO of Onex Corporation.

== Personal life ==
In 1982, Schwartz married Heather Reisman, who would later go on to become chief executive of Indigo Books and Music. Schwartz has two children from his first marriage and two stepchildren from his marriage to Heather Reisman. The couple are members of the Reform synagogue, Holy Blossom Temple in Toronto. Schwartz and Reisman own the most expensive house in Toronto, valued at $28 million.

=== Recognition ===
The Gerald Schwartz School of Business at St. Francis Xavier University was named in his honour in recognition of his donations to the university. In 2005, he was awarded the Ernst & Young Entrepreneur Of The Year 2005 Ontario Lifetime Achievement award. In 2006, he was made an Officer of the Order of Canada.

=== Philanthropy ===
Schwartz is the co-founder of the Heseg Foundation for Lone Soldiers alongside his wife, Heather Reisman. The organization provides millions of dollars of support in the form of scholarships, a living wage and career development opportunities as a reward for military service with the Israeli Defense Forces (IDF) every year to non-Israeli Jews who volunteered to join the Israeli military and to some Israeli soldiers as well. In 2006, he made a donation to University of Waterloo for an exchange program between University of Waterloo and the University of Haifa.

Mount Sinai Hospital announced in December 2013 that a transformational $15 million gift from Schwartz and Reisman would be used to "reshape emergency medicine" at the facility.

The Gerald Schwartz and Heather Reisman Foundation donated $5.3 million to St. Francis Xavier University in Antigonish, Nova Scotia in late 2018 to create scholarships, bursaries and increased recruitment of business students.

In March 2019, the University of Toronto announced that Schwartz and Reisman were giving the university $100 million to build a 750,000-square foot innovation centre through the Gerald Schwartz & Heather Reisman Foundation. According to Reisman, the Schwartz Reisman Innovation Campus will be used to improve technology, particularly Artificial intelligence, and how the public can relate to it. One of the two towers will house the Schwartz Reisman Institute for Technology and Society and the Vector Institute for Artificial Intelligence while the other will include labs for research in regenerative medicine, genetics and precision medicine.
