= Aleixo Muise =

Canadian scientist and physician

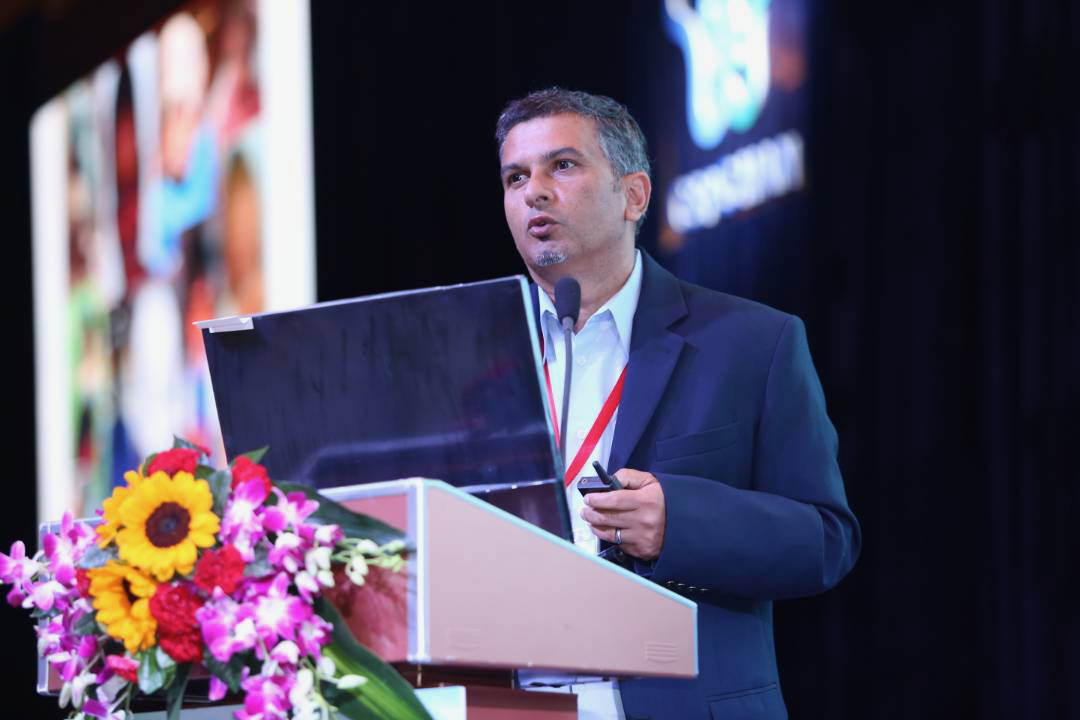
- Born: June 5, 1969 (age 57)
- Education: University of Toronto; Dalhousie University
- Known for: gastroenterology; inflammatory bowel disease; very early onset inflammatory bowel disease
- Scientific career
- Fields: Medicine; Precision medicine
- Workplaces: University of Toronto; Hospital for Sick Children

Aleixo M. Muise FRCPC (born June 5, 1969) is a Canadian scientist, pediatrician and gastroenterologist known for contributions to the understanding of very early onset inflammatory bowel disease. He is a professor of pediatrics at the University of Toronto, a Tier 1 Canada Research Chair in pediatric inflammatory bowel disease, and a pediatric gastroenterologist at the Hospital for Sick Children.

== Biography ==
Muise completed a Bachelor of Science degree at St. Francis Xavier University, followed by graduate studies at Carleton University and Dalhousie University. His postgraduate work was with Daniela Rotin at the Hospital for Sick Children in Toronto. He completed undergraduate and postgraduate training in medicine, pediatrics and gastroenterology at the University of Toronto.

Muise was appointed as full professor in the departments of Pediatrics and Biochemistry and in the Institute of Medical Science at the University of Toronto in 2018. He was awarded a Tier 1 Canada Research Chair in pediatric inflammatory bowel disease in 2019.

== Research ==
Muise's clinical and research program focuses on very early onset inflammatory bowel disease (VEOIBD), a type of inflammatory bowel disease that affects children under the age of six. His research program has identified a number of novel genetic determinants in IBD and VEOIBD. Muise's laboratory uses techniques such as whole exome sequencing and whole genome sequencing to identify known and novel genetic variants in children with intestinal diseases. Most notably, Muise identified a novel form of VEOIBD related to mutations in the TTC7A gene and described potential treatments for this incurable disease. He has uncovered the underlying genetic and functional causes of a number of diseases, including PLVAP, ARPC1B and SYK.

Muise's research has allowed for appropriate, personalized treatment to be given to children with genetic forms of intestinal disease, including bone marrow transplantation. Muise's lab has also identified VEOIBD rare functional variants in the NADPH oxidase genes, iNOS, and IL10R that lead to risk of developing VEOIBD, and may allow for novel treatment strategies based on these genetic findings.

Muise founded the interNational Early Onset Paediatric IBD Cohort Study (NEOPICS) consortium, which connects pediatric gastroenterologists and scientists internationally to identify patients with rare intestinal diseases. This has allowed for the creation of the largest repository of DNA of patients with VEOIBD.

== Honors ==
- Canada Research Chair in Pediatric Inflammatory Bowel Disease (Tier 1), Canadian Institutes of Health Research (CIHR), Government of Canada, 2019
- Young Investigator in Basic Science, American Gastroenterological Association/Gastroenterology Research Group, 2015
