= DNAAF8 =

Protein-coding gene in the species Homo sapiens

Identifiers
- Aliases: DNAAF8, chromosome 16 open reading frame 71, C16orf71, dynein axonemal assembly factor 8
- External IDs: GeneCards: DNAAF8

Gene location (Human)
Chr.	Chromosome 16 (human)
Band	16p13.3	Start	4,734,344 bp
Band	16p13.3	End	4,749,396 bp
RNA expression pattern
Bgee	Human / Mouse (ortholog); Top expressed in: left testis; right testis; right uterine tube; olfactory zone of nasal mucosa; epithelium of bronchus; testicle; bronchial epithelial cell; gonad; anterior pituitary; nasal epithelium / n/a; More reference expression data
BioGPS	n/a
Orthologs
Databases	NCBI: entry; OMA: entry
Species	Human	Mouse
Entrez	146562	n/a
Ensembl	ENSG00000166246	n/a
UniProt	Q8IYS4	n/a
RefSeq (mRNA)	NM_139170	n/a
RefSeq (protein)	NP_631909	n/a
Location (UCSC)	Chr 16: 4.73 – 4.75 Mb	n/a
PubMed search		n/a
- Wikidata
View/Edit Human

Dynein axonemal assembly factor 8 is a protein which in humans is encoded by the gene DNAAF8 (formerly C16orf71). This gene is involved in the assembly of the outer arms of dyneins, a type of motor protein. The gene is expressed in epithelial tissue of the respiratory system, adipose tissue, and the testes. 1357 bp of the gene are antisense to spliced genes ZNF500 and ANKS3.

== Gene ==
=== Locus ===
The gene is located on the short arm of chromosome 16 at 16p13.1. Its genomic sequence begins on the plus strand at 4,734,242 bp and ends at 4,749,396 bp.

A diagram of C16orf71 and nearby genes on human chromosome 16.

== mRNA ==
=== Alternative splicing ===
Three different protein encoding transcript variants, or isoforms, have been identified for C16orf71. One non-protein coding transcript variant was identified for the gene.

Name	Length (bp)	Protein (aa)	Mass (kDa)	Biotype
Uncharacterized protein C16orf71 (primary assembly)	2716	520	55.7	Protein coding
Uncharacterized protein C16orf71 isoform X2	2324	136	14.6	Protein coding
Uncharacterized protein C16orf71 isoform X3	2435	156	16.8	Protein coding
Uncharacterized protein C16orf71 isoform X1	2562	537	57.5	Protein coding
Uncharacterized protein C16orf71 Transcript-003	3705	No protein	–	Retained intron

== Protein ==
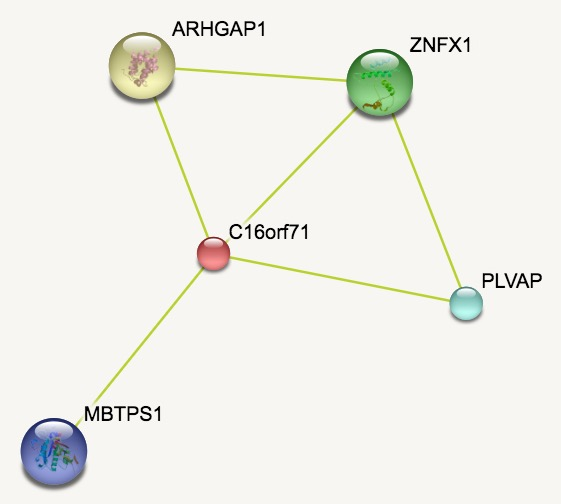
A map indicating the predicted interacting proteins of C16orf71.

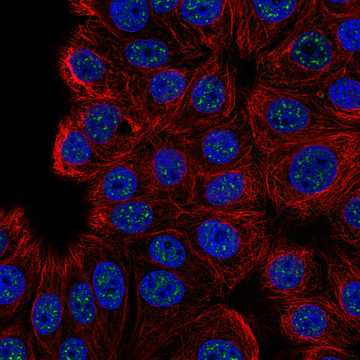
Evidence of localization at nuclear speckles of the nucleus, indicated by the green spots where in situ hybridization occurred with the antibody.

=== General properties ===
The primary encoded protein consists of 520 amino acid residues, 11 total exons, and is 15.14 kb long, with a molecular weight of approximately 55.68 kDa. The predicted isoelectric point was reported to be 4.81, indicating it is relatively unstable. The gene was reported to be well expressed, at 1.1 times the average gene level.

=== Composition ===
Alanine was the most abundant amino acid, contributing to 11.54% of the molecular weight of the protein. Serine was the second most abundant, contributing 10.19% to the overall molecular weight. The average Alanine frequency in vertebrate proteins is approximately 7.4% and the average Serine frequency is approximately 8.1%.

=== Domains ===
C16orf71 has one identified domain of unknown function, DUF4701, that is conserved in all mammals and some species of reptiles and birds. DUF4701 spans from amino acid residue 21 to 520 in the protein.

=== Post-translational modifications ===
C16orf71 is predicted to undergo multiple post-translational modifications such as phosphorylation, N-glycosylation, and amidation.

=== Protein interactions ===
==== Experimentally proven interactions ====
Experimentation with C16orf71 has revealed interactions with four other proteins, ARHGAP1, ZNFX1, PLVAP, and MBTPS1. ARHGAP1, ZNFX1, and MBTPS1 are associated with regulation in signaling and metabolism while PLVAP is associated with the formation of small lipid rafts in the plasma membrane of vertebrate endothelial and adipose cells.

=== Subcellular localization ===
C16orf71 was observed in nuclear speckles of the nucleus through experimental protocols involving fluorescent in situ hybridization with antibodies. Nuclear speckles, also known as interchromatin granule clusters, are enriched in pre-mRNA splicing factors. These highly dynamic structures are located in interchromatin regions of the nucleoplasm in mammalian cells and have been observed to cycle throughout various nuclear regions and active transcription sites.

== Expression ==
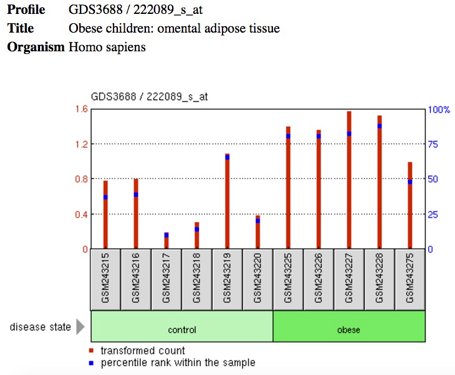
Expression levels of C16orf71 from microarray analysis in obese omental adipose tissue.

=== Tissue expression pattern ===
Human expression for the gene has been observed primarily in respiratory epithelial tissue, specifically the trachea, larynx, nasopharynx, and bronchus. C16orf71 is also moderately expressed in adipose tissue and testes.

==== DNA microarray experimental data ====
DNA microarray analysis from various experiments provided information on the expression levels of C16orf71 in unique, varying conditions.

The gene appears to have higher levels of expression in the omental adipose tissue of obese subjects compared to non-obese subjects.

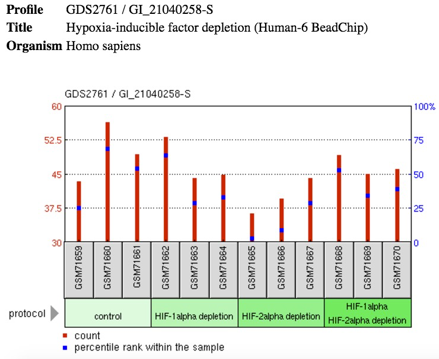
Expression levels of C16orf71 in the occurrence of HIF-1 alpha/HIF-2 alpha depletion.

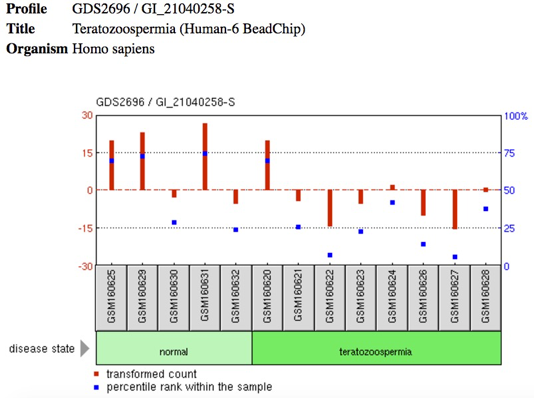
Expression levels of C16orf71 in sperm with teratozoospermia.

C16orf71 was also observed to have decreased expression when there was a depletion of HIF-1 alpha, HIF-2 beta, or both. HIF, or hypoxia-inducible factors, are responsible for the mediation of hypoxia effects within the body. In addition, HIFs promote clotting and restoration of various epithelial tissues and are vital in the development of mammalian embryos, sperm, and ova.

Data from an experiment also indicated noticeably lower expression of the gene in sperm affected with teratozoospermia, a condition where sperm have abnormal morphology affecting the fertility in males, compared to normal sperm.

C16orf71 was observed to be present in all stages of development, with similar levels of expression throughout.

==== Toxicogenomics experimental data ====
Three chemicals, bisphenol A, butyraldehyde, and polychlorinated biphenyls, have been experimentally tested with C16orf71 for evidence of interaction.

Bisphenol A is suspected to cause impairment in male reproduction. An experiment utilizing seminiferous tubule culture was conducted to observe the effects on meiosis and potential germ-line abnormalities. Gene expression analysis revealed decrease expression for C16orf71 when exposed to the chemical.

Butyraldehyde has been observed to affect inflammatory responses in bronchial airway tissue on a genetic level. Microarray analysis was used to determine levels of expression in human alveolar epithelial cells after exposure to the compound. Results indicated decreased expression for C16orf71 when exposed to the chemical.

Polychlorinated biphenyl was used in an experiment to determine its effects on external male genital development. Human fetal corpora cavernosa cells were used as the model tissue. Toxicogenomic analysis indicated the chemical affected all genes involved with genitourinary development and revealed lowered expression levels for C16orf71.

=== Regulation of expression ===
1357 bp of the gene are antisense to spliced genes ZNF500 and ANKS3.

==== Predicted transcription factors ====
Transcription factor	Associated functions
Ascl1 (Mammaliam achaete scute homolog 1)	B-cell differentiation, maturation, and development Negative regulation of transcription and apoptosis Positive regulation of cell cycle and cellular differentiation Response to hypoxia and epidermal growth factor Regulation of epithelial cell differentiation
ZNF500 (Zinc finger with KRAB and SCAN domains 3)	Cartilage development Negative regulation of gene expression and cellular senescence T-cell and stem cell differentiation Positive regulation of transcription
SMAD4 transcription factor involved in TGF-beta signaling	Regulation of apoptosis, T-cell and endothelial cell activation Endoderm formation and development Negative regulation of cell growth and death Response to hypoxia Thyroid gland development Tissue morphogenesis
Cysteine-serine-rich nuclear protein 1	TGF-beta induced apoptosis Regulation of early development and differentiation Extracellular matrix formation

== Homology ==
=== Orthologs ===
Orthologs have been identified in most mammals for which complete genome data is available. C16orf71 and its domain of unknown function, DUF4701, was present in mammals. The most distant orthologs identified were reptilian.
