= Gerald Schwartz School of Business =

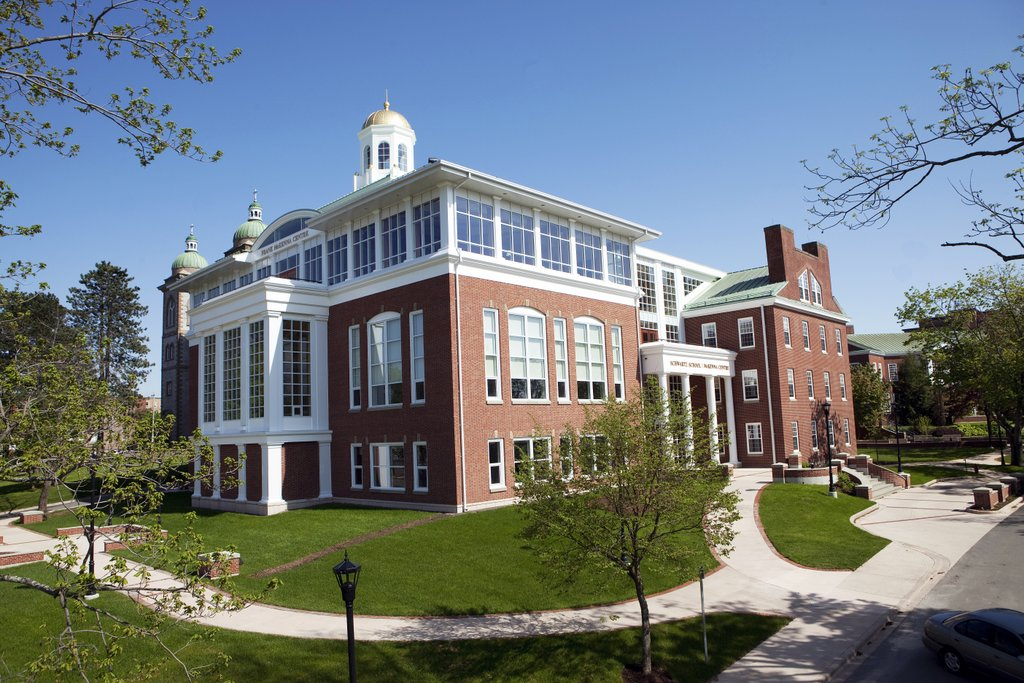
Gerald Schwartz School of Business

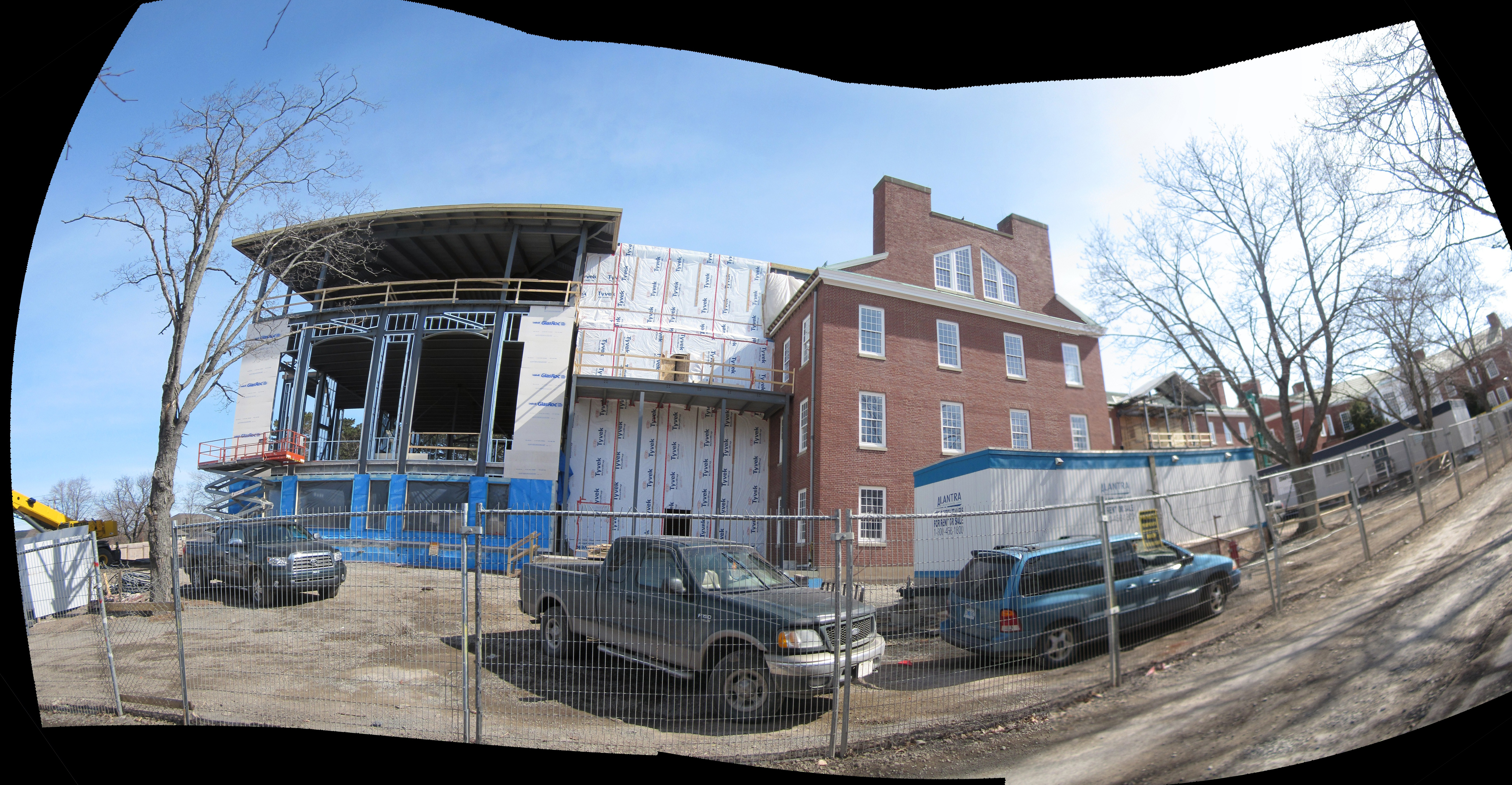
Construction of Gerald Schwartz School of Business, March 19, 2010.

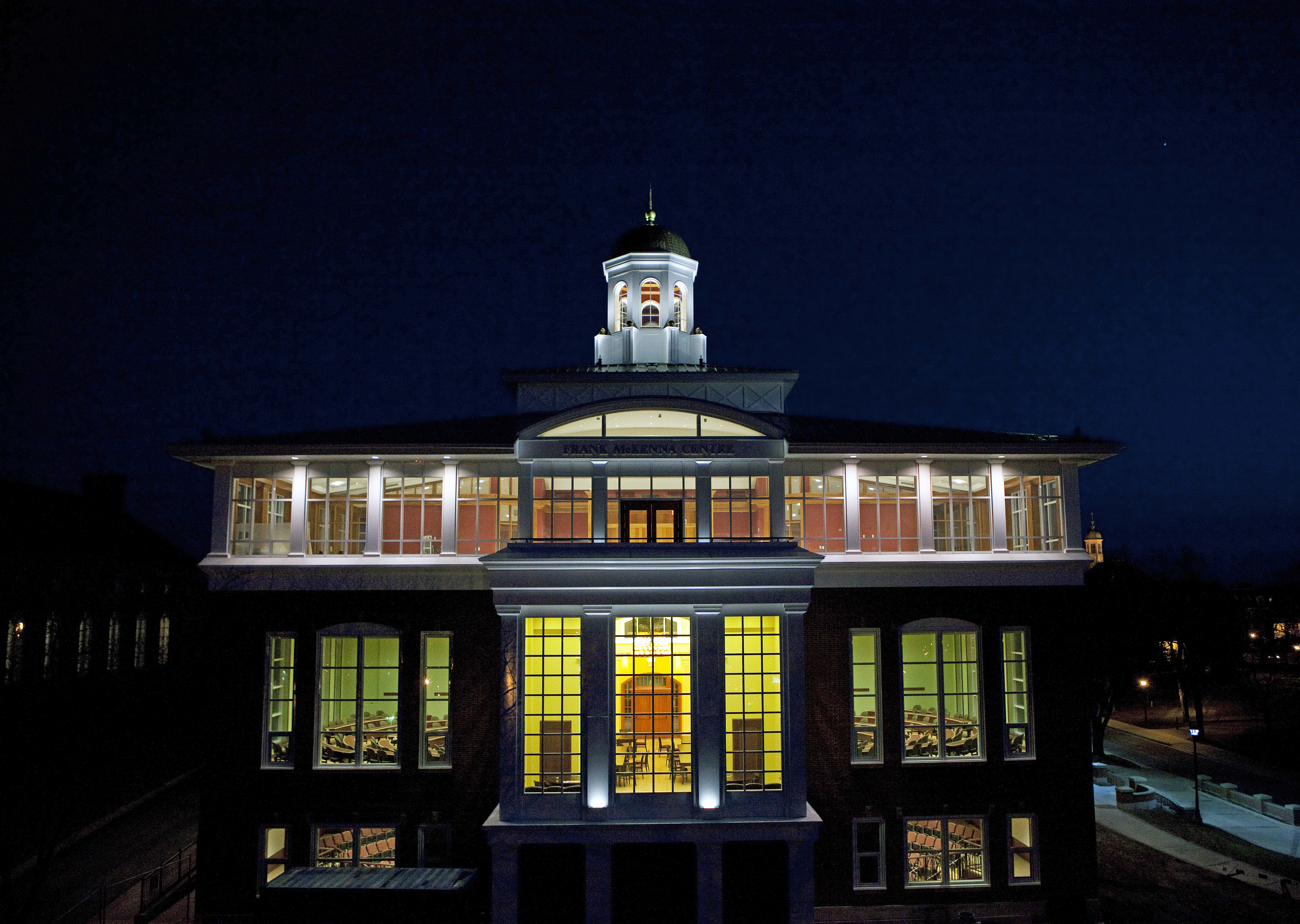
Gerald Schwartz School of Business

The Gerald Schwartz School of Business and Information Systems is located on the campus of St. Francis Xavier University in Antigonish, Nova Scotia. It was named after businessman Gerald Schwartz in recognition of his donations to the university and opened on November 1, 2010. The school hosts 15 streams of Bachelor of Business Administration studies as well as a Bachelor of Information Systems with a major or minor. The new facility, topped by a gilt dome, houses four floors of classrooms, an auditorium, lecture halls, faculty office space, seminar rooms, student service centre, lounges, research labs and meeting areas.
