= St. Francis Xavier University =

University in Antigonish, Canada

- Coat of arms of the university
- Former names: Arichat College (1853–1855); St. Francis Xavier College/ Seminary (1855–1866)
- Motto: Quaecumque Sunt Vera (Phil 4,8) (Latin)
- Motto in English: What so ever things are true
- Type: Public liberal arts university
- Established: 1853; 173 years ago
- Religious affiliation: Roman Catholic
- Academic affiliations: Maple League of Universities, AUCC, IAU, CUSID, CBIE, CUP.
- Endowment: $239 million
- Chancellor: Mila Mulroney
- President: Andrew Hakin
- Faculty: 265
- Students: 5,022 (Fall 2026)
- Undergraduates: 4,346
- Postgraduates: 676
- Location: Antigonish, Nova Scotia, Canada; 45°37′05″N 61°59′40″W
- Campus: Rural
- Language: English
- Colours: Blue, Marigold and White
- Nickname: X-Men and X-Women
- Sporting affiliations: U Sports; AUS
- Website: stfx.ca
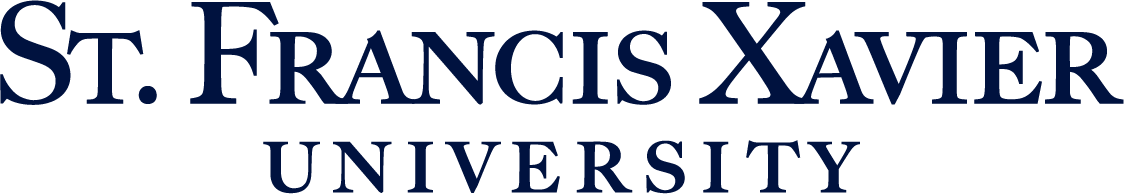

St. Francis Xavier University is a public undergraduate liberal arts university located in Antigonish, Nova Scotia, Canada. It is a member of the Maple League, a group of primarily undergraduate universities in Eastern Canada.

== History ==
St. Francis Xavier College was founded as Arichat College, a Roman Catholic diocesan educational institution at Arichat, Nova Scotia, in 1853. Arichat College was moved to its present location in Antigonish, and established as St. Francis Xavier College in 1855. On May 7, 1866, St. Francis Xavier College was given university status, becoming St. Francis Xavier University. The university awarded its first degrees in 1868.

In 1883, Mount St. Bernard Academy was founded for female education, with girls from primary grades to grade 12 taught by the Sisters of Notre Dame.

Architect Henry Frederick Busch designed the college building in 1888.

In 1894, the academy affiliated with St. Francis Xavier University as Mount St. Bernard College. In 1897, the school became the first co-educational Catholic university in North America to grant degrees to women. Four women were awarded university degrees in 1897.

A metal plaque in the St. Francis Xavier University Chapel is dedicated to the thirty-three members of the college, now St. Francis Xavier University, who were killed in service during the First World War (1914–18).

In February 1922, St. Francis Xavier University's War Memorial Rink, with a brick exterior and wooden interior, opened. After the War Memorial Rink was officially closed on February 8, 2002, the building was torn down and a new science complex was built in the old rink's place.

StFX's extension department has engaged in community development in Antigonish since 1928 while the Coady International Institute at StFX has engaged in community development globally since 1959.

A metal plaque, unveiled on 5 May 1984, was dedicated by the university's class of 1984, in honour of those students killed in armed conflict while defending the liberty of Canadians.

In 1985, the number of women students at St. Francis Xavier became equal to the number of men for the first time. In 1990, the women's college existed as a residence only.

In the early 20th century, professional education expanded beyond the traditional fields of theology, law and medicine. Graduate training based on the German-inspired American model of specialized course work and the completion of a research thesis was introduced. The policy of university education initiated in the 1960s responded to population pressure and the belief that higher education was a key to social justice and economic productivity for individuals and for society.

The St. Francis Xavier tartan was designed as a university tartan in 1994.

In 1996, StFX implemented Canada's first Service Learning program, which provided opportunities for international learning.

In February 2020, Dr. Andy Hakin was named the university's 19th president and vice-chancellor by StFX's board of governors. He began his tenure on July 1, 2020.

== Academics ==
=== Profile ===
University rankings

World rankings

Canadian rankings
- Maclean's Undergraduate: 10
- Maclean's Reputation: 33

Maclean's 2022 Guide to Canadian Universities ranked St. Francis Xavier seventh in the magazine's undergraduate university category. In the same year, the university placed 34th in Maclean's reputational survey of Canadian universities.

Between 2000 and 2004, more St Francis Xavier students, on a per capita basis, have received Natural Sciences and Engineering Research Council (NSERC) awards for post-secondary study than any other university in Canada.

=== Faculties and programs ===
St Francis Xavier University is organized into the Faculty of Arts, Faculty of Science, the Gerald Schwartz School of Business, Faculty of Education, the Brian Mulroney Institute of Government and the Coady Institute. Faculties are headed by a dean elected from among the constituent professors.

== Scholarships and bursaries ==
St. Francis Xavier offers over $2 million annually in merit-based scholarships and financial aid to its new and current undergraduates. Applicants with a Grade 12 average of at least 85% are automatically guaranteed an entrance scholarship worth at least $5,000 ($1,250 each year for four years), and at least $7,000 for those with Grade 12 averages above 90% ($1,750 each year for four years). Applicants are also automatically considered for larger merit-based scholarships ranging from $12,000 to $32,000 (Merit, Phillip W. Oland, J.P. McArthy, Canadian, President's). Area-specific scholarships also exist for applicants from certain provinces and the United States. In order to receive each subsequent installment of a scholarship (typically there are four installments), students must maintain a university course average of at least 80%.

StFX offers scholarships to students of Indigenous and African Nova Scotia descent thanks to support from the Jeannine Deveau Educational Equity Endowment. Deveau, a StFX graduate from 1944, created the endowment to help remove financial barriers that typically prevent students from minority racialized populations in Nova Scotia from accessing post-secondary education. The Jeannine Deveau Educational Equity Endowment has contributed $22 million toward financial aid at StFX, making it the largest single amount pledged by a StFX alumna or alumnus in the university's history.

== X-Ring ==
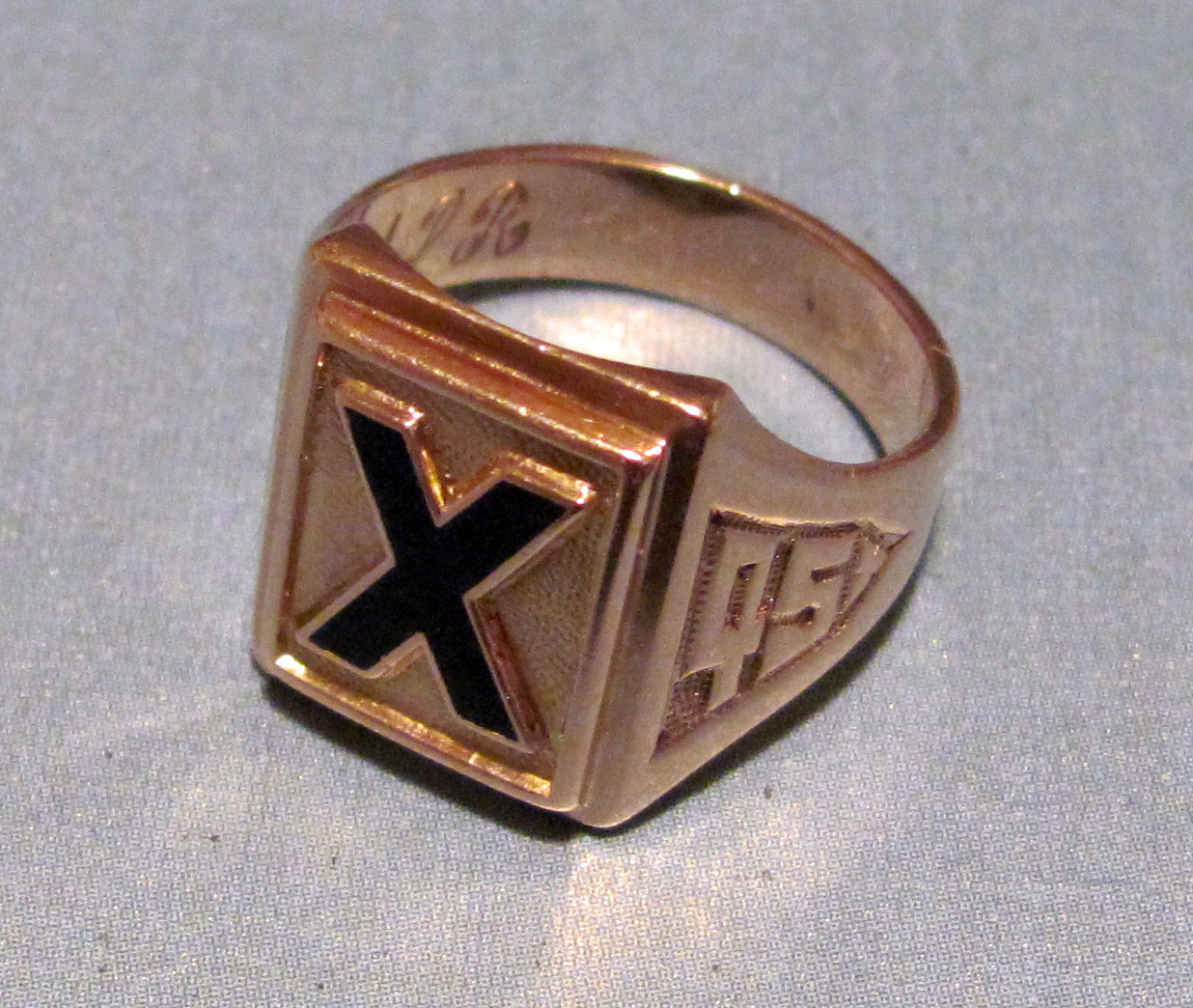
St. Francis Xavier University Class Ring of 1945

St. Francis Xavier University ceremonially awards to students a distinctive X-Ring. The ring is awarded on December 3 (Saint Francis Xavier's feast day) of each year before the students' graduation. On average, more than 95% of the graduating class opt for the ring.

== Campus renewal ==
Beginning in 1996 with the appointment of longstanding president Sean Riley, the university underwent a $230 million campus renewal initiative to improve educational and residential opportunities throughout campus. To date, the initiative has seen the completion of eleven large-scale projects.

- The creation of Mulroney Hall, which houses the Brian Mulroney Institute of Government in addition to several university classroom spaces, was announced in October 2016. The project includes a $40 million capital investment as well as $20 million in endowment funds for the institute. Named after former Prime Minister Brian Mulroney, an alumnus of the university, the centre is the first of its type at a primarily undergraduate university in Canada dedicated to issues of public policy and governance.
- Riley Hall (2014) and O'Regan Hall (2013). Named in honour of the university's former president (1996–2014) Sean Riley, as well the late Paul O’Regan and Stephen O’Regan, founders of O’Regan's Automotive Group, the new buildings each house over 150 students feature a mix of single and apartment-style rooms. In 2015, the new residences were ranked best university residences in Canada by UniversityHub. Each building is heated and cooled by using 26 geothermal wells, and is designed to be LEED Gold Certified for energy efficiency.
- Frank McKenna Centre for Leadership was opened on May 11, 2011. Former US president Bill Clinton attended as keynote speaker. The $12 million facility is designed to broaden the leadership environment that already exists at St. Francis Xavier. Located in the heart of St. Francis Xavier's campus, the McKenna Centre supports targeted initiatives in the fields of public policy, business, and health, including a leadership speakers series and a leaders in residence program. The centre is home to an executive leadership training program, educating top national and international talent.
- Construction of the Gerald Schwartz School of Business building began in June 2009, after an investment of $22.7 million from the federal and provincial governments. The grand opening was held on November 5, 2011, in presence of Gerry Schwartz, president of Onex Corporation, and Frank McKenna. It was named after the businessman in recognition of his donations to the university. The school hosts 15 streams of Bachelor of Business Administration studies as well as a Bachelor of Information Systems with a major or minor. The new facility, topped by a gilt dome, houses four floors of classrooms, an auditorium, lecture halls, faculty office space, seminar rooms, student service centre, lounges, research labs and meeting areas.
- In June 2008, construction of the new Coady International Centre began. The project includes the restoration of four historic campus buildings, some as dating as far back as 1890, in order to expand the current Coady International Institute at St. Francis Xavier University.
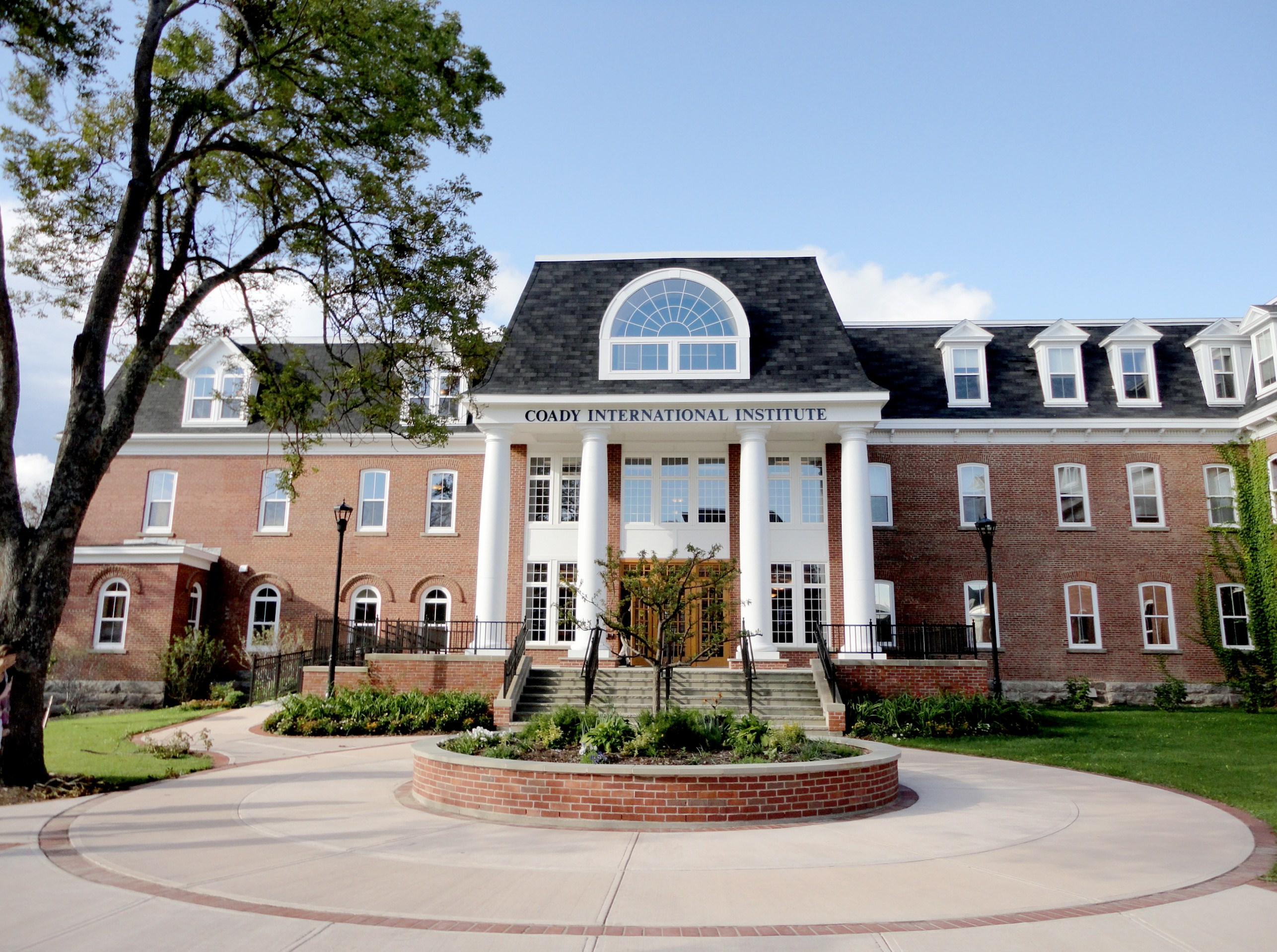
Coady International Institute

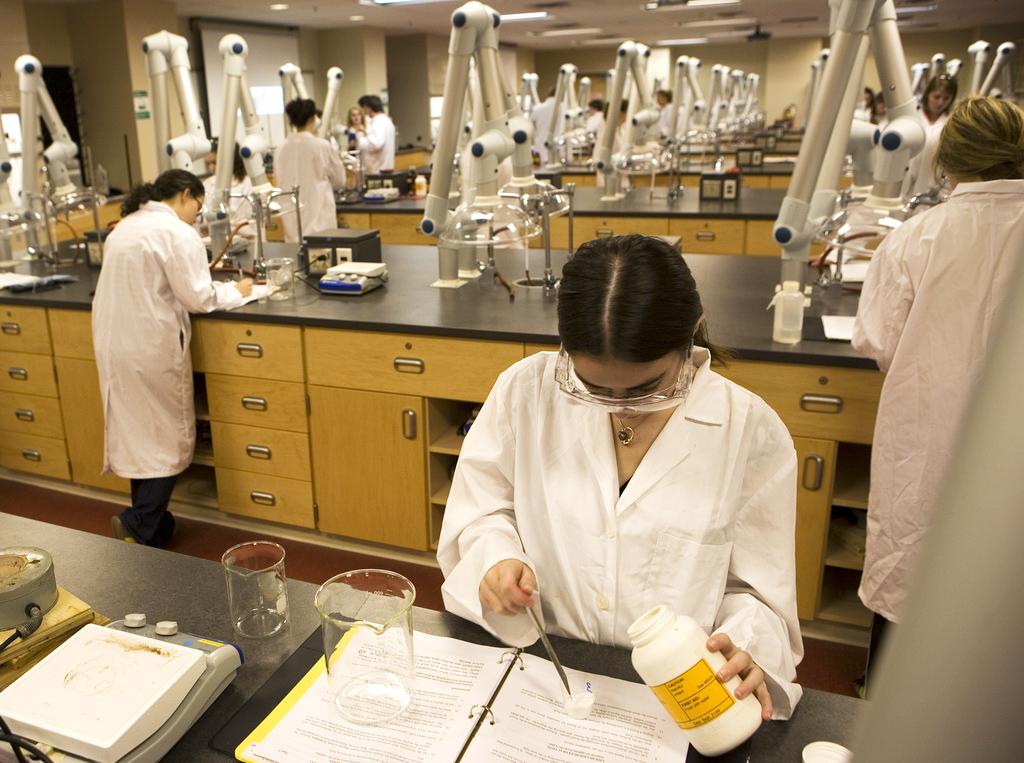
Physical Sciences Center lab

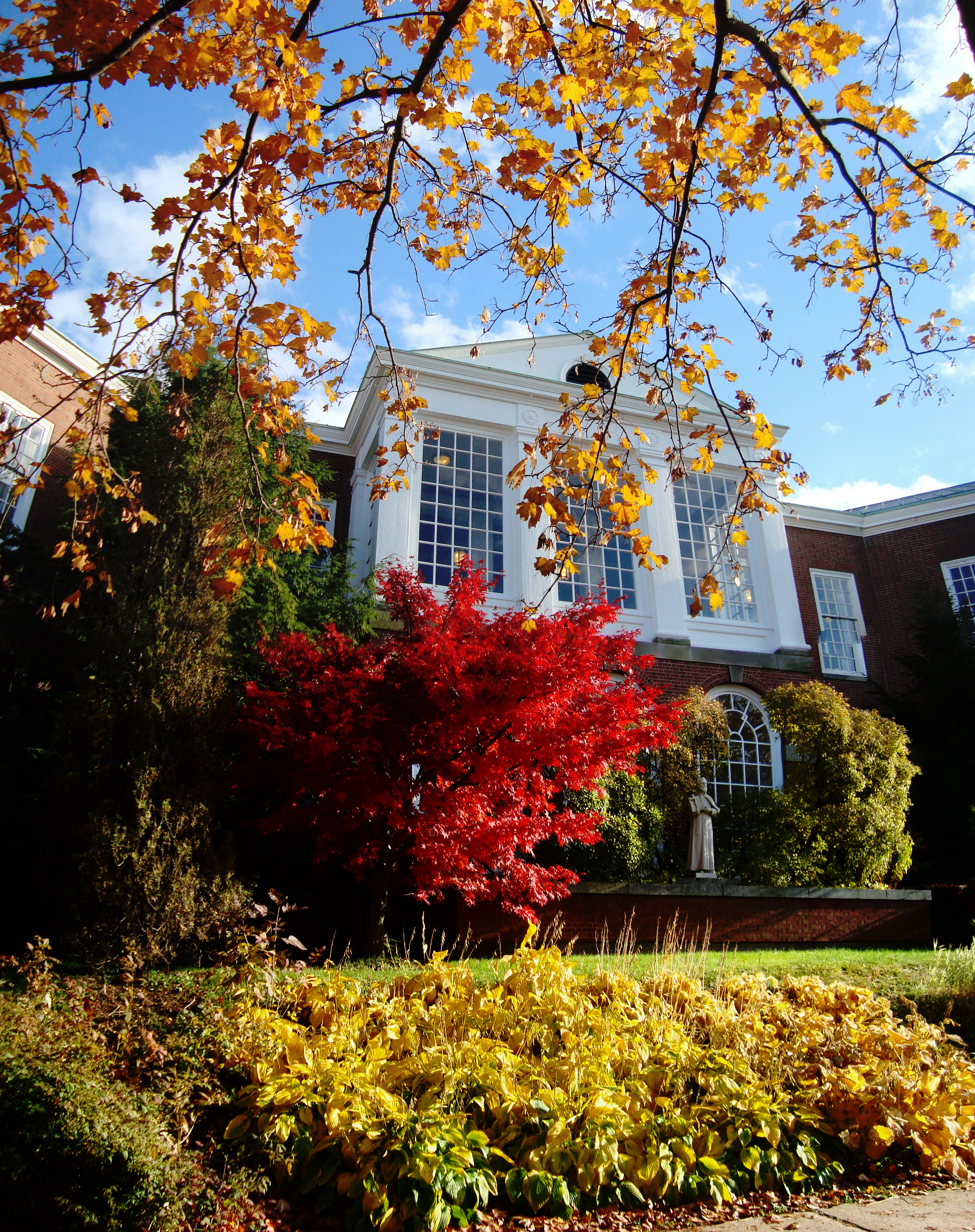
Angus L. MacDonald Library

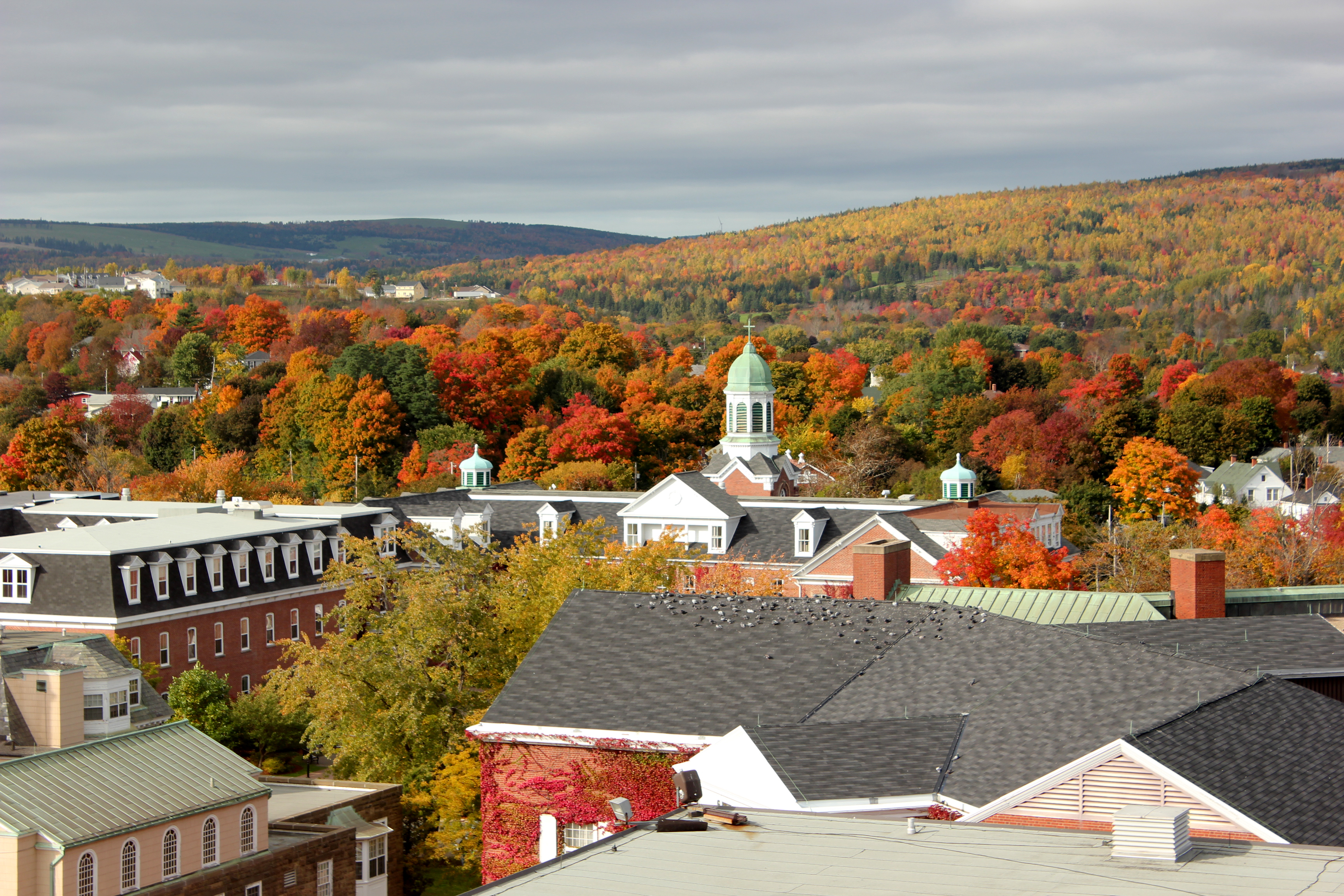
Xavier Hall

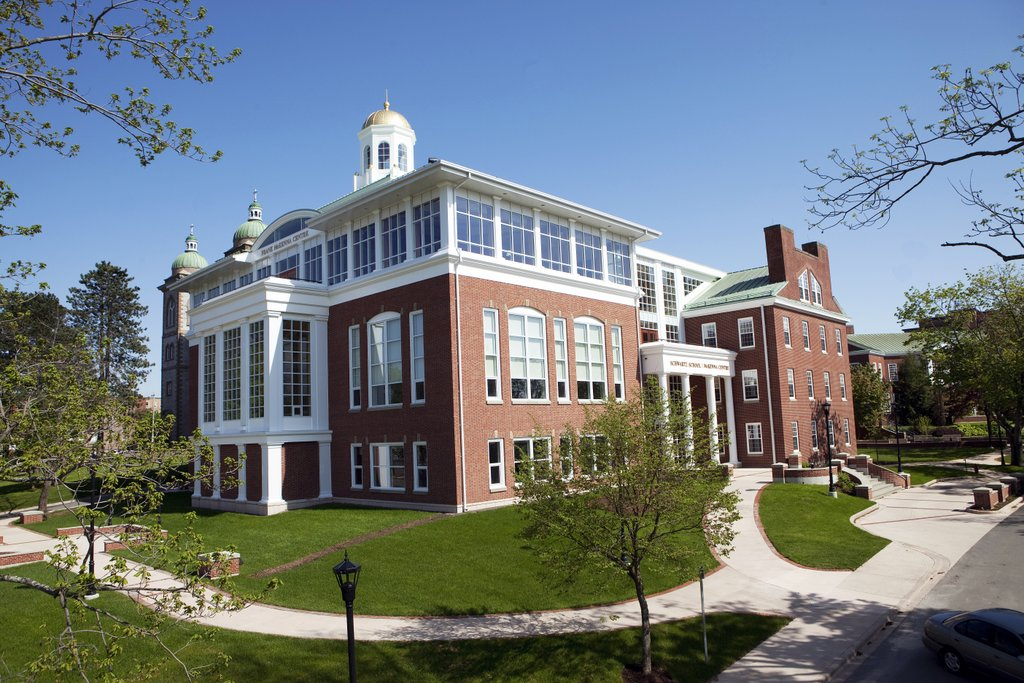
Gerald Schwartz School of Business

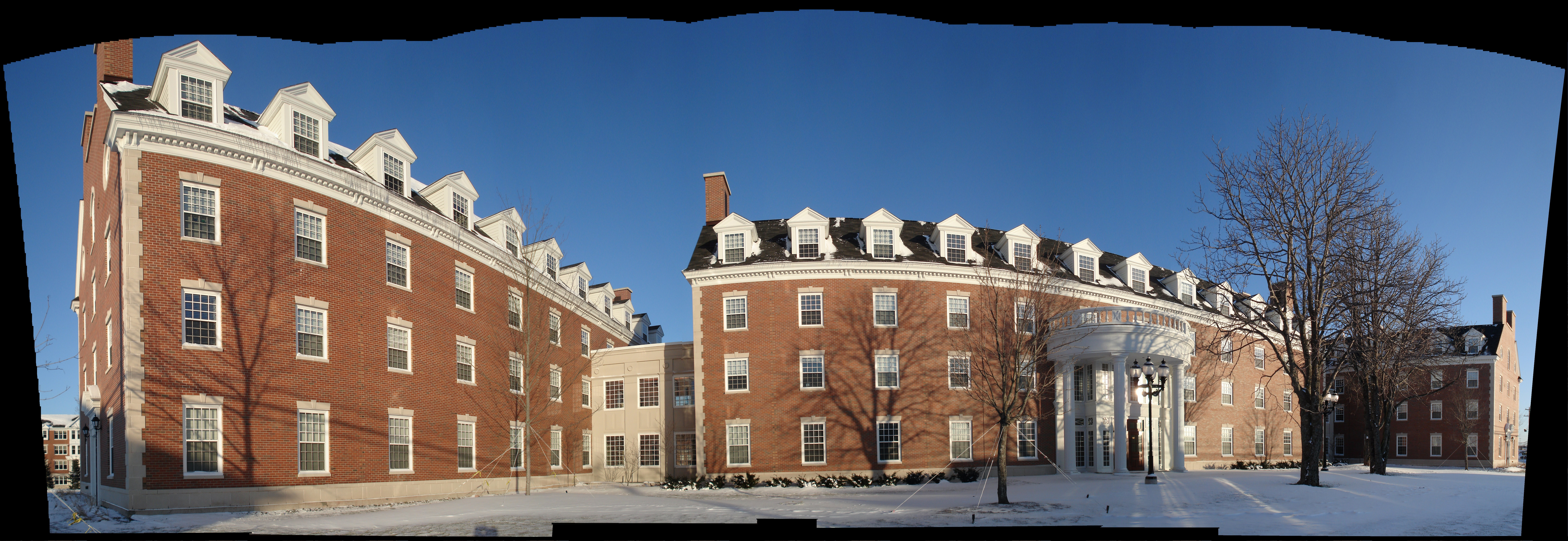
Governors Hall Residence

== Athletics ==
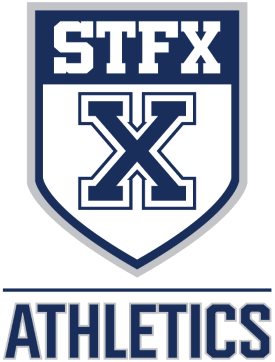
St. Francis Xavier athletics logo

St. Francis Xavier is represented in the Atlantic University Sport conference by 12 varsity athletics teams. The X-Men teams include men's football, basketball, cross-country, track and field, soccer, and hockey. The X-Women teams include basketball, cross country, track and field, hockey, rugby and soccer.

In 2006, the X-Women Rugby team became the first female St. Francis Xavier varsity team to win a CIS Championship, as 10-time defending AUS Rugby Champions. In 2008, the team placed 2nd at the CIS Championships in Lethbridge, Alberta after capturing their 12th consecutive AUS Championship.

== Post stamp ==
On 4 April 2003 Canada Post issued "St. Francis Xavier University, 1853–2003" as part of the Canadian Universities series. The stamp was based on a design by Denis L'Allier, based on a photograph by Guy Lavigueur. The 48¢ stamps are perforated 13.5 and were printed by Canadian Bank Note Company, Limited.

== Noted faculty ==
- Louis Groarke, Professor of Philosophy
- Edward Langille, Professor of Modern Languages
- Henry Roy William Smith, Professor of Classics
- Lavinia Stan, Professor of Political Science and European Research Area (ERA) Chair
- William Sweet, Professor of Philosophy

== Noted alumni ==
- John Allan Cameron, Celtic musician
- Father Moses Coady, leader of the Antigonish Movement
- Martin William Currie, Archbishop of the Roman Catholic Archdiocese of St. John's, Newfoundland 2007–
- Gerry Dee, actor and comedian
- Randy Delorey, lecturer, MLA, Antigonish (2013–2021), former cabinet minister
- Pat Dunn, former Minister of Health Promotion and Protection and Member of the Legislative Assembly, Pictou Centre, Nova Scotia (2006–2009)
- Vernon Fougère, Bishop Emeritus of the Roman Catholic Diocese of Charlottetown
- Danny Gallivan, Sportscaster for the Montreal Canadiens
- Eric Gillis, Olympic Games Competitor at Beijing 2008, London 2012, and Rio 2016
- Danny Graham, former Leader of the Liberal Party of Nova Scotia (2002–2005), and MLA, Halifax Citadel, Nova Scotia (2003–2005)
- Robert J. Higgins, New Brunswick politician, Supreme Court justice
- Charles V. Keating, Canadian businessman
- Larkin Kerwin, Canadian physicist, president of National Research Council Canada (1980–1989) and the Canadian Space Agency (1989–1992)
- Larry Lamb, English actor best known as Archie Mitchell in BBC television soap EastEnders
- Mary Jane Lamond, Canadian folk musician
- Sara Kaljuvee, Olympic bronze medalist for Rugby Sevens
- Ghislaine Landry, Olympic rugby player at the 2016 Summer Olympics.
- Mitchell McMullin, seven time Mr.Olympia (Men’s Physique - Class F Super Heavyweight)
- Amanda Lindhout, journalist and author
- Allan H. MacDonald, theoretical physicist
- Angus L. Macdonald, Premier of Nova Scotia (1933–1940; 1945–1954), Canada's Minister of Defence for Naval Services (1941–1945)
- Colin MacDonald, lead singer for Canadian rock group The Trews
- Rodney MacDonald, Premier of Nova Scotia 2006–2009
- Ronald J. MacDonald, former world record holder in the indoor one mile run and eleven mile cross country run. Boston Marathon Champion in 1898.
- Ronald St. John Macdonald, Canadian legal academic and jurist
- Allan J. MacEachen, first Deputy Prime Minister of Canada
- Linden MacIntyre, Canadian journalist, broadcaster and novelist
- John Keiller MacKay, Lieutenant Governor of Ontario 1957–1963
- Alistair MacLeod, Canadian writer
- Lisa MacLeod, Member of Provincial Parliament, Nepean-Carleton, Ontario
- Frank McKenna, Premier of New Brunswick 1987–1997, Canadian Ambassador to the United States 2005 – January 25, 2006
- Aleixo Muise, medical researcher and physician
- Brian Mulroney, Prime Minister of Canada 1984–1993
- Lowell Murray, Former Canadian senator 1979–2011
- Mark Norris, Former Minister of Economic Development in the Legislative Assembly of Alberta 2001–2004
- Seamus O'Regan, former co-host of CTV's morning television programme, Canada AM, MP for St. John's South—Mount Pearl.
- Daniel Petrie, American-based Canadian television and movie director
- Ed Picco, Former politician in Nunavut 1995–2008
- Lisa Raitt, Former Member of Parliament 2008–2019, Halton, former federal Minister of Transport.
- John Ralston, Canadian actor
- Geoff Regan, Former Member of Parliament for Halifax West, Nova Scotia 2000-2021, Speaker of the House of Commons. 2015-2019
- Mike Smith, Canadian actor ("Bubbles" on the Trailer Park Boys)
- P.J. Stock, former NHL player and Montreal sports radio broadcaster
- Annette Verschuren, Canadian businessperson, president of The Home Depot Canada and Asia
- Michael Walker, economist, founder of the Fraser Institute
- Sam Webb, leader of the Communist Party USA, 2000–2014
- Currie Dixon, Premier of Yukon, 2025–
- Several CFL players drafted including Henoc Muamba selected first overall to Winnipeg Blue Bombers in 2011, Bill McIntyre, 5th round to Hamilton Tiger-Cats in 1987, Akeem Foster and Cauchy Muamba with B.C. Lions, Eugene Belliveau with Montreal Alouettes, and Mike McCullough.
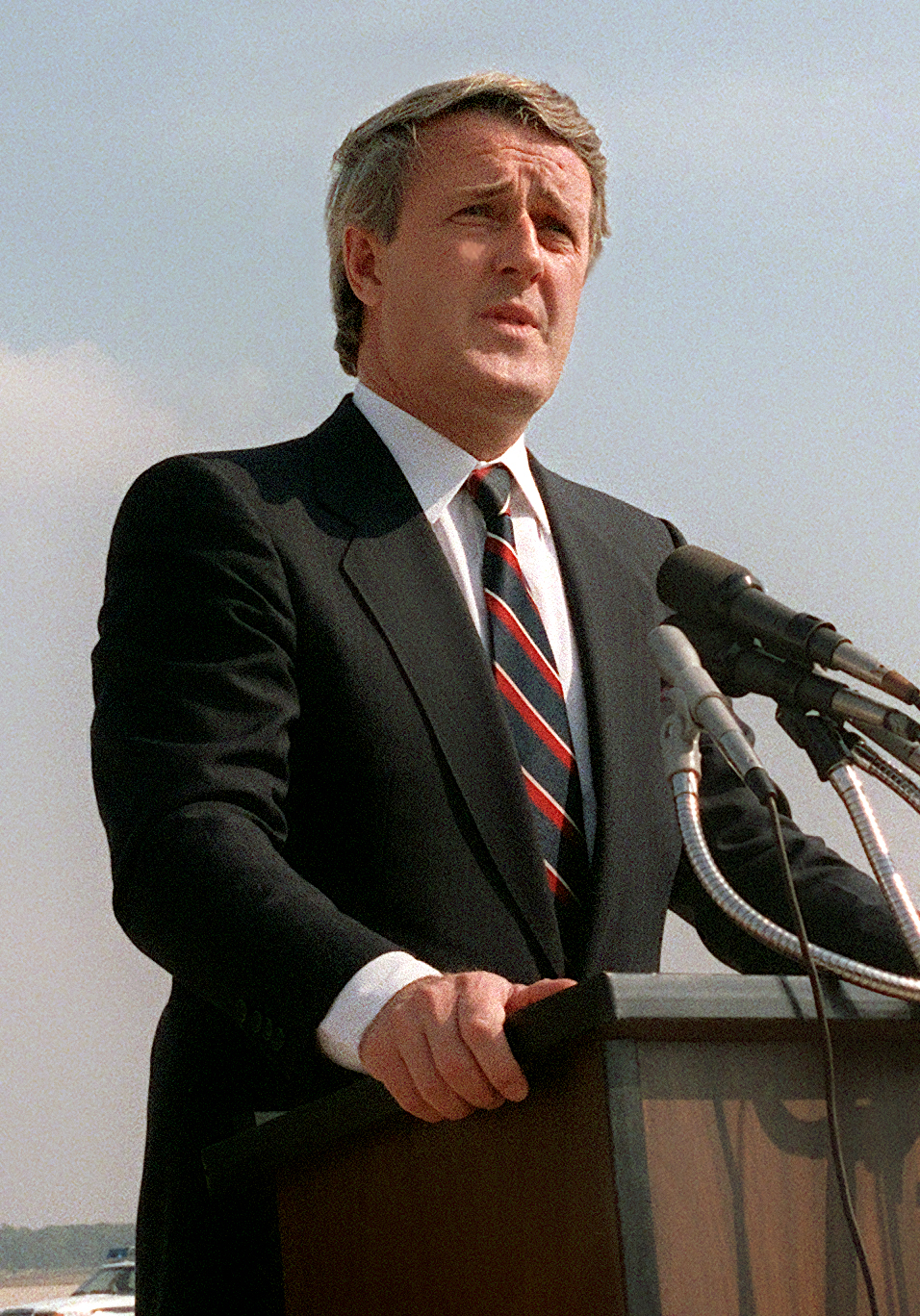
Brian Mulroney: 18th Prime Minister of Canada (1984–1993)

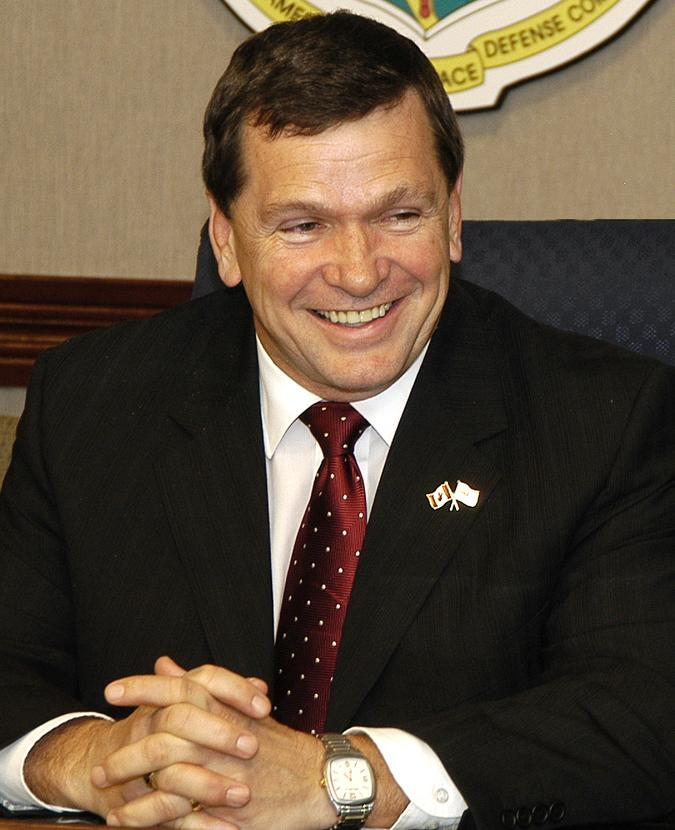
Frank McKenna: Premier of New Brunswick (1987–1997); Canadian Ambassador to the United States (2005–2006)

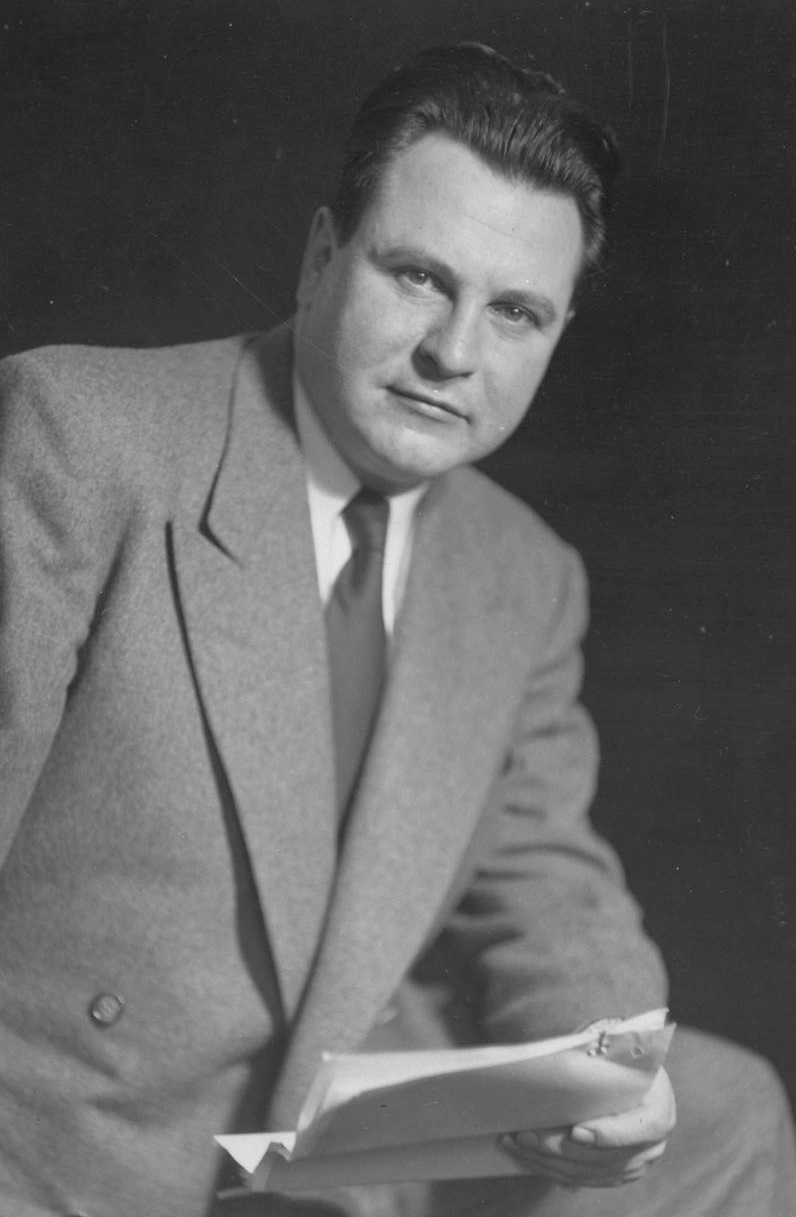
Allan J. MacEachen: first Deputy Prime Minister of Canada (1977–1979, 1980–1984)

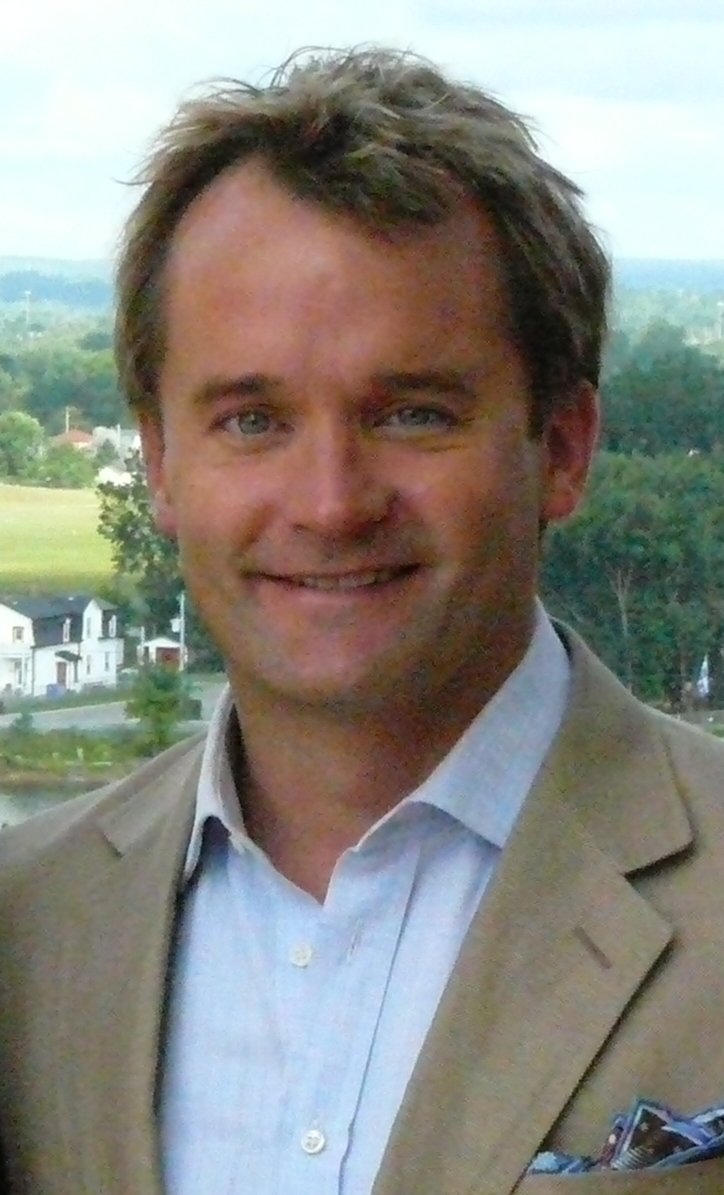
Seamus O'Regan, broadcast journalist, television host, MP for St. John's South—Mount Pearl.

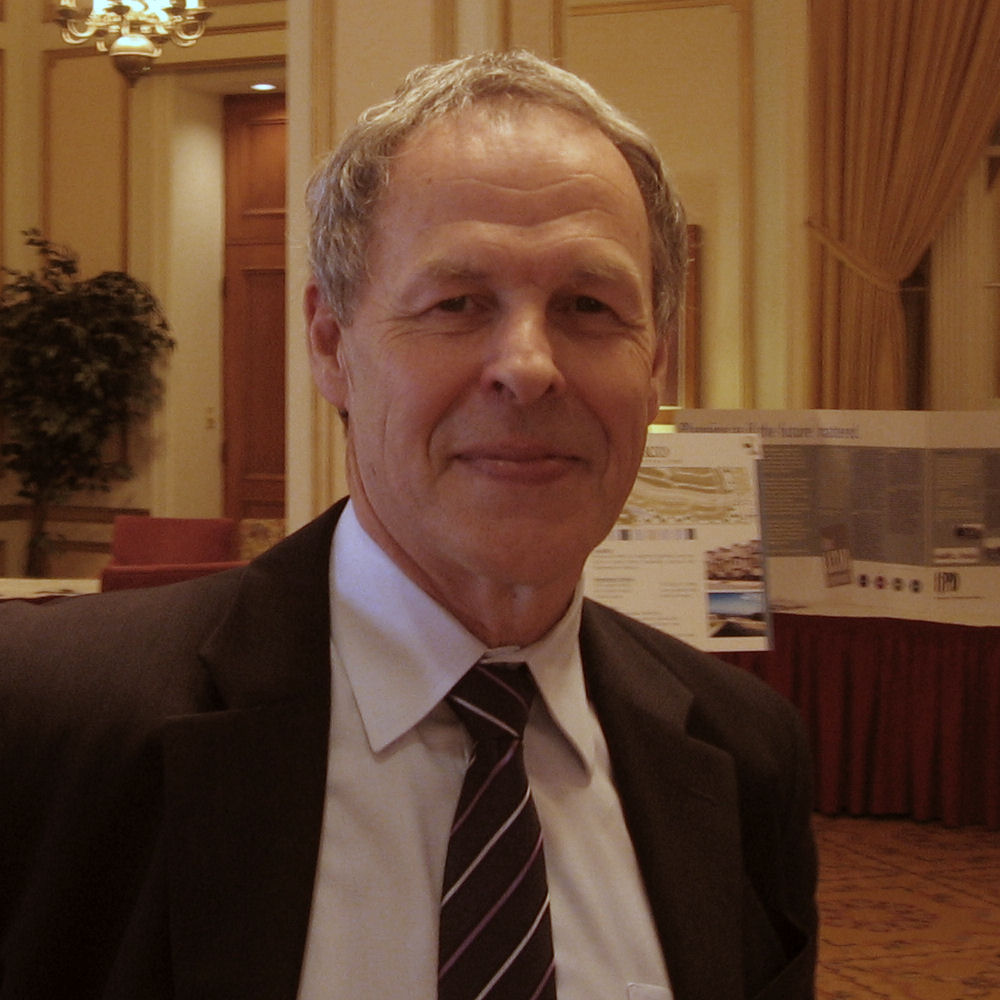
Linden MacIntyre, journalist, broadcaster and novelist.

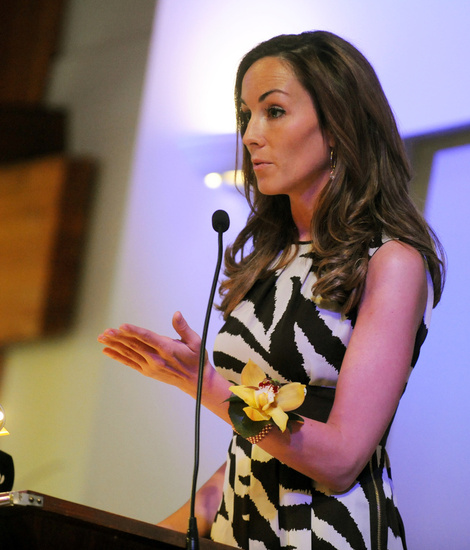
Amanda Lindhout, humanitarian, journalist and author.

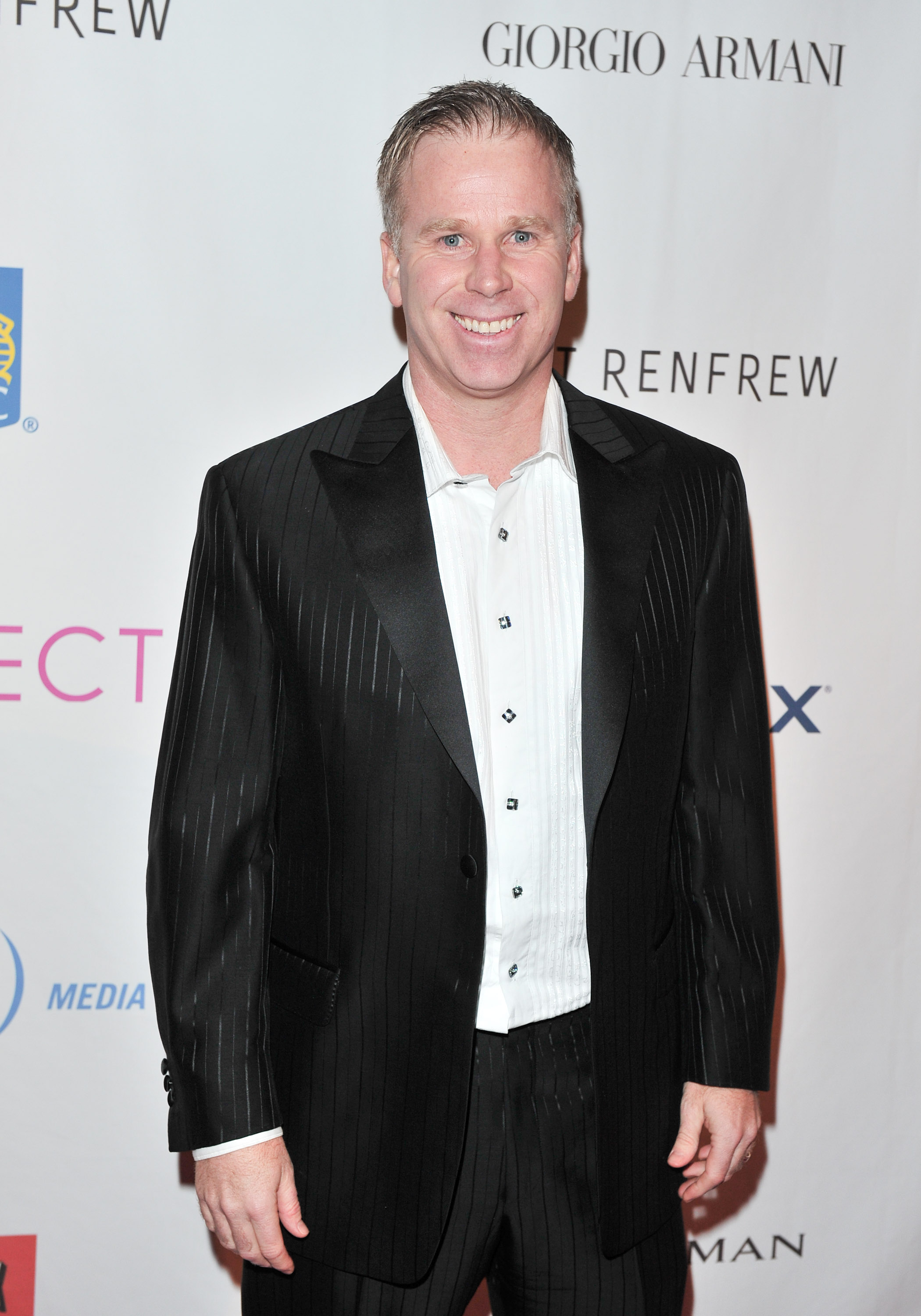
Gerry Dee, actor and stand-up comedian.

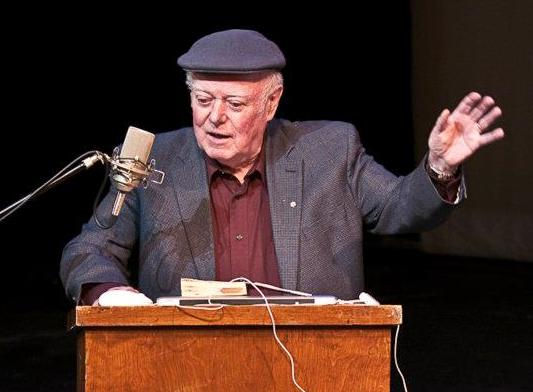
Alistair MacLeod, novelist, short-story writer and academic.

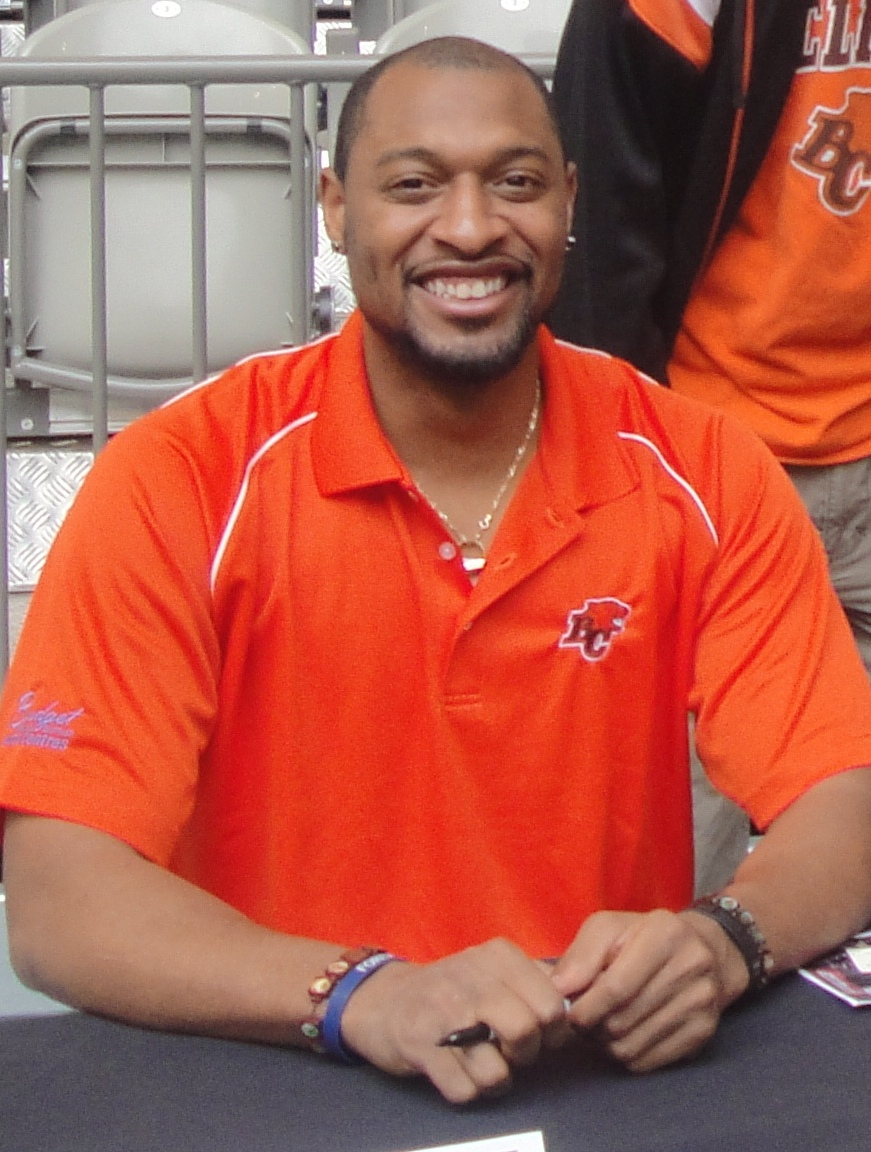
Akeem Foster, professional Canadian football wide receiver for the Edmonton Eskimos.

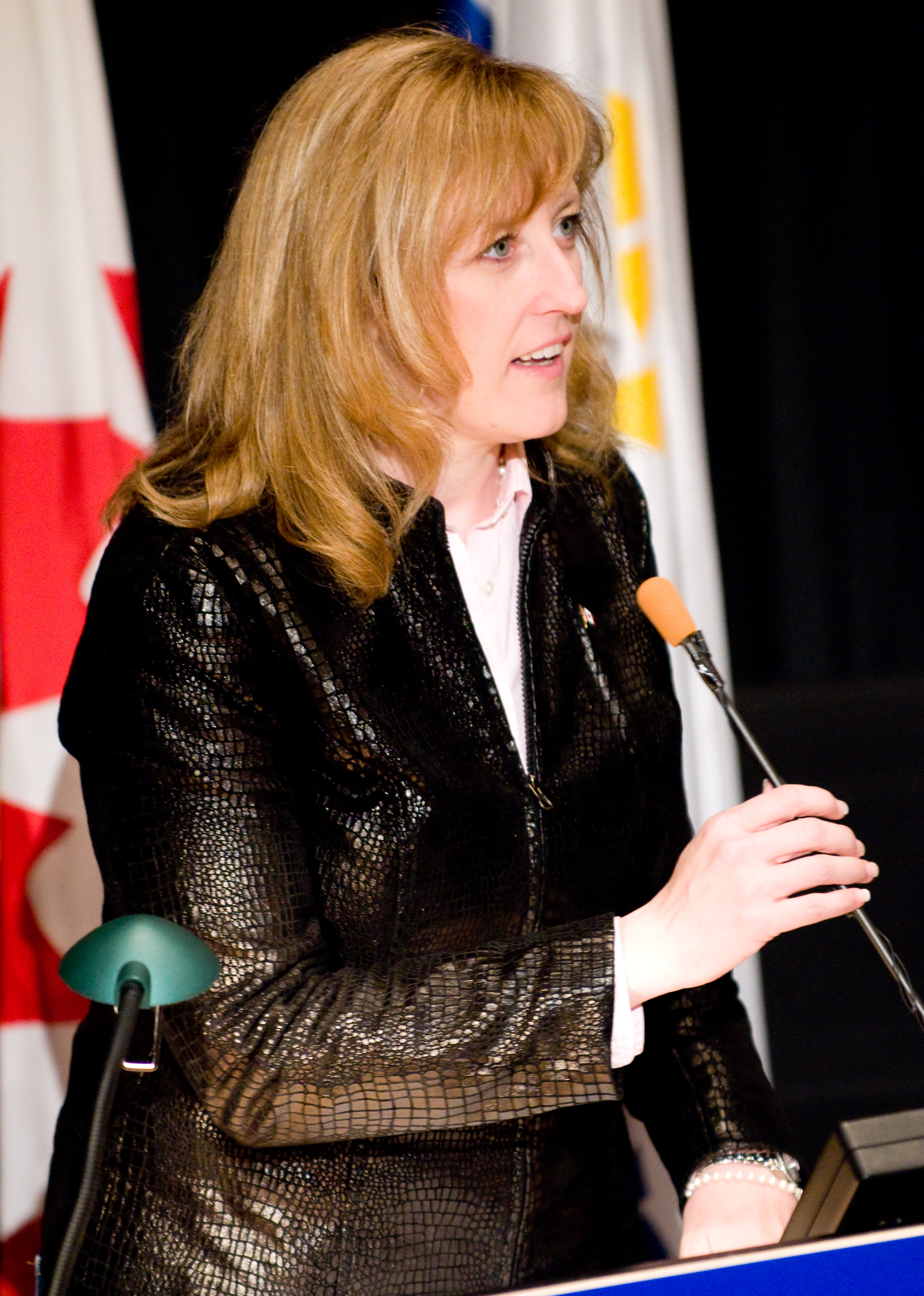
Lisa Raitt, Member of Parliament (2008–present), former federal Minister of Transport.

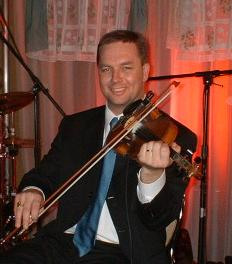
The Honourable Rodney MacDonald, former Premier of Nova Scotia.

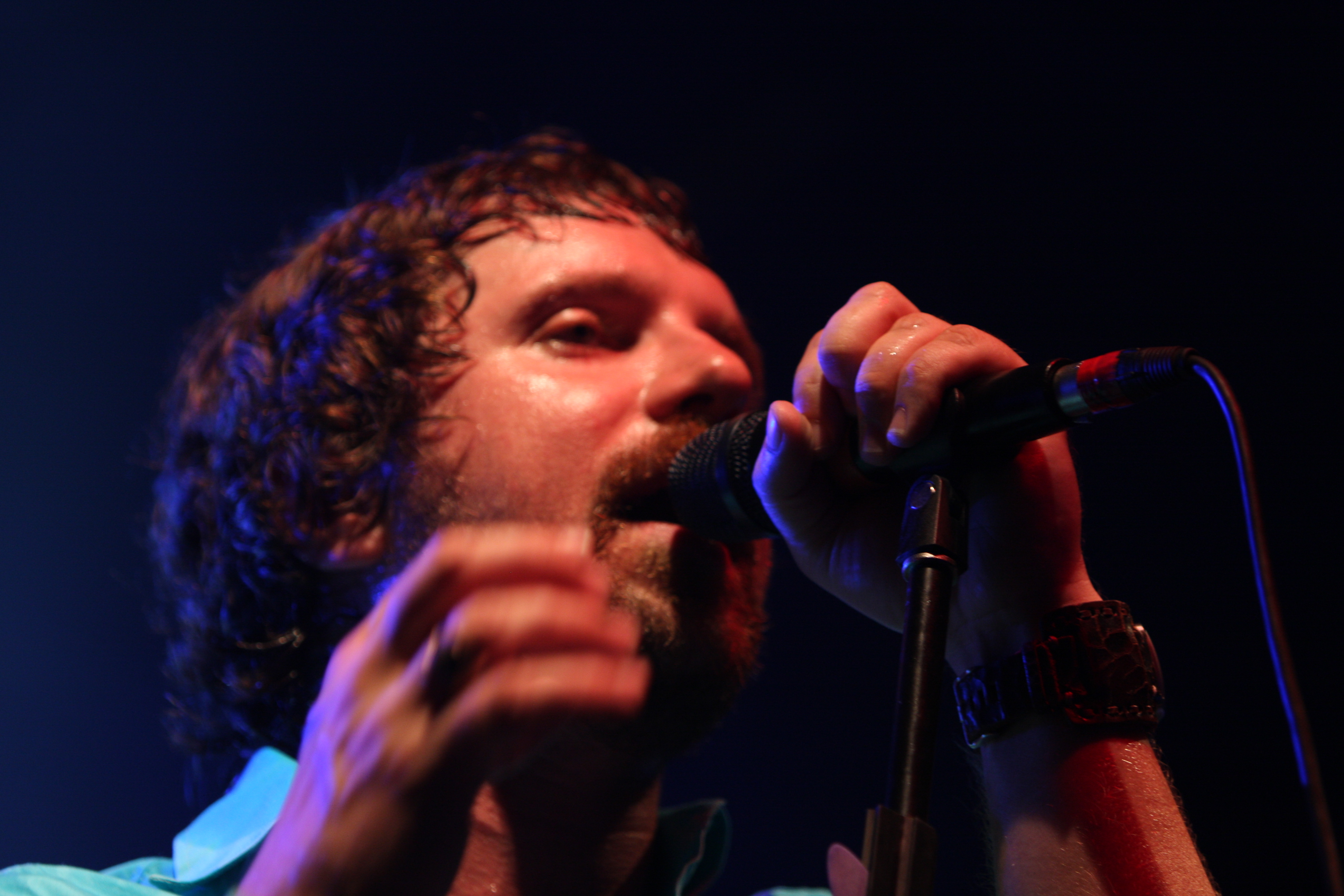
Colin MacDonald, lead singer and rhythm guitarist for the rock group The Trews.

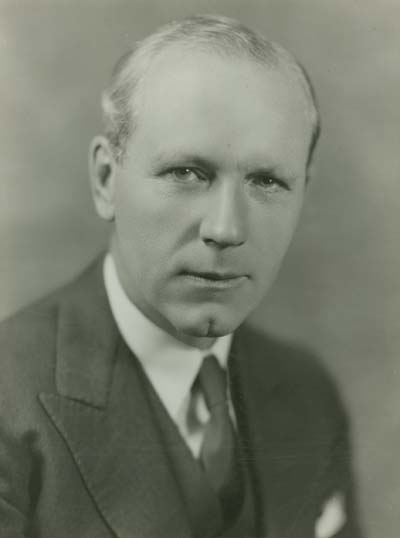
Angus Lewis MacDonald, federal Minister of Defence for Naval Services during World War II.

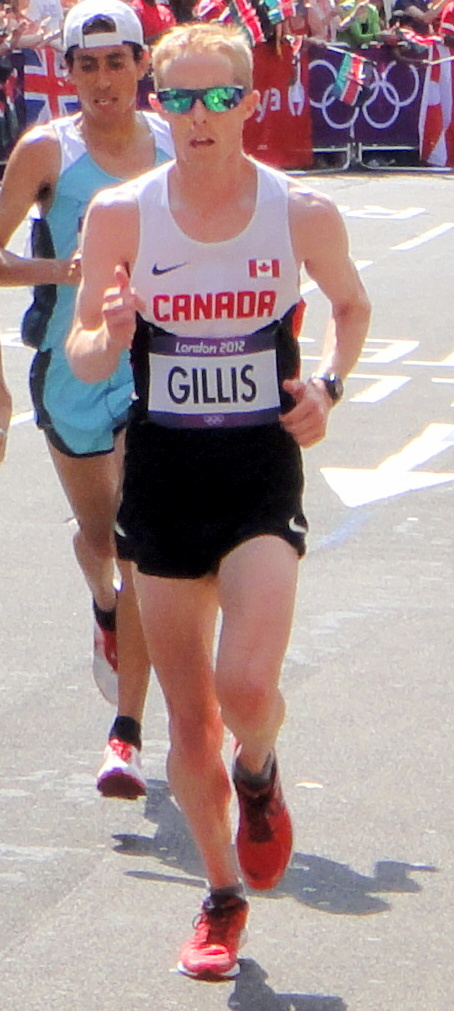
Eric Gillis, Canadian Olympic runner.

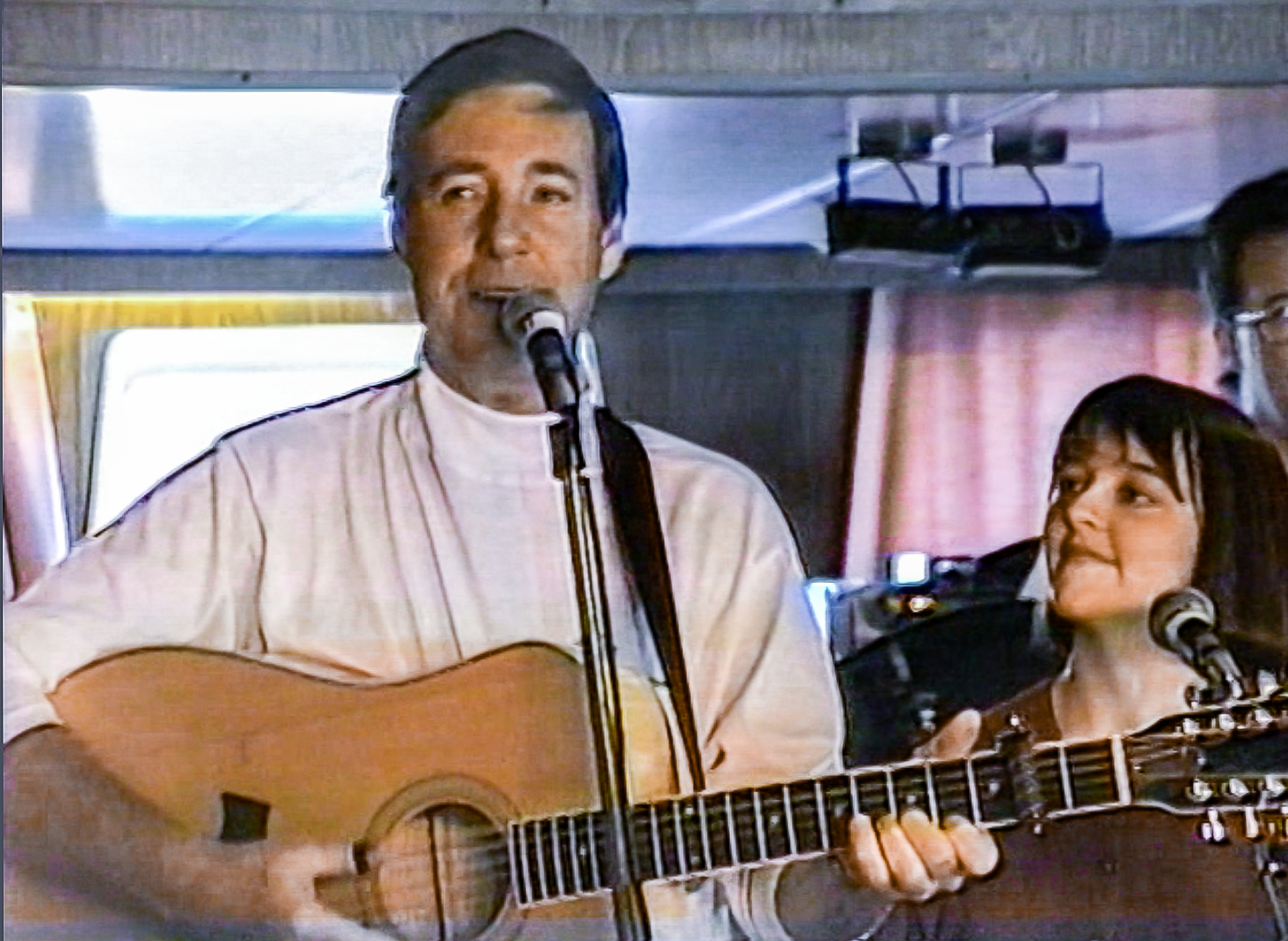
John Allan Cameron, "The Godfather of Celtic Music" in Canada.

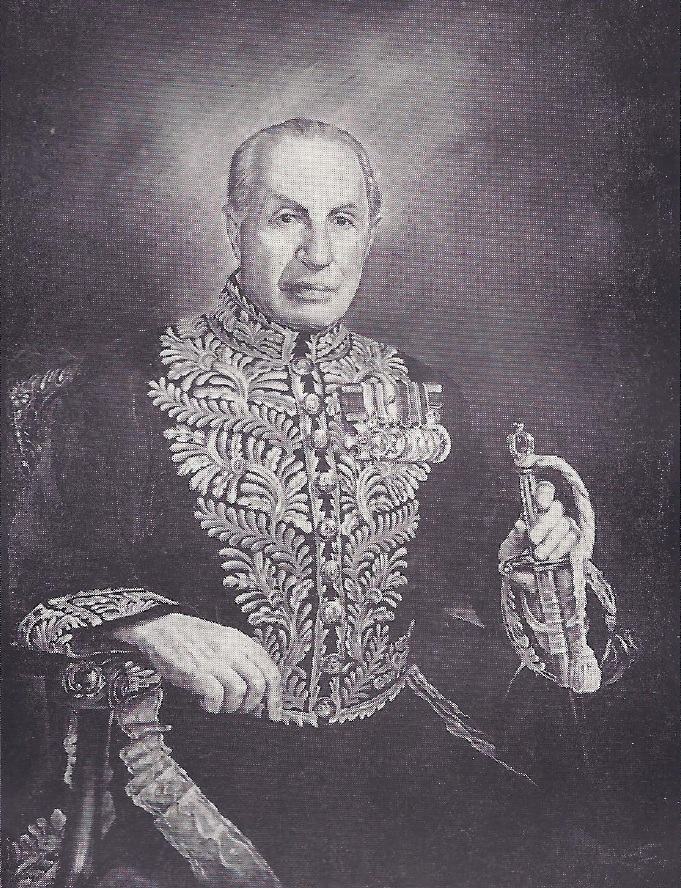
John Keiller MacKay, Lieutenant Governor of Ontario, 1957–1963.

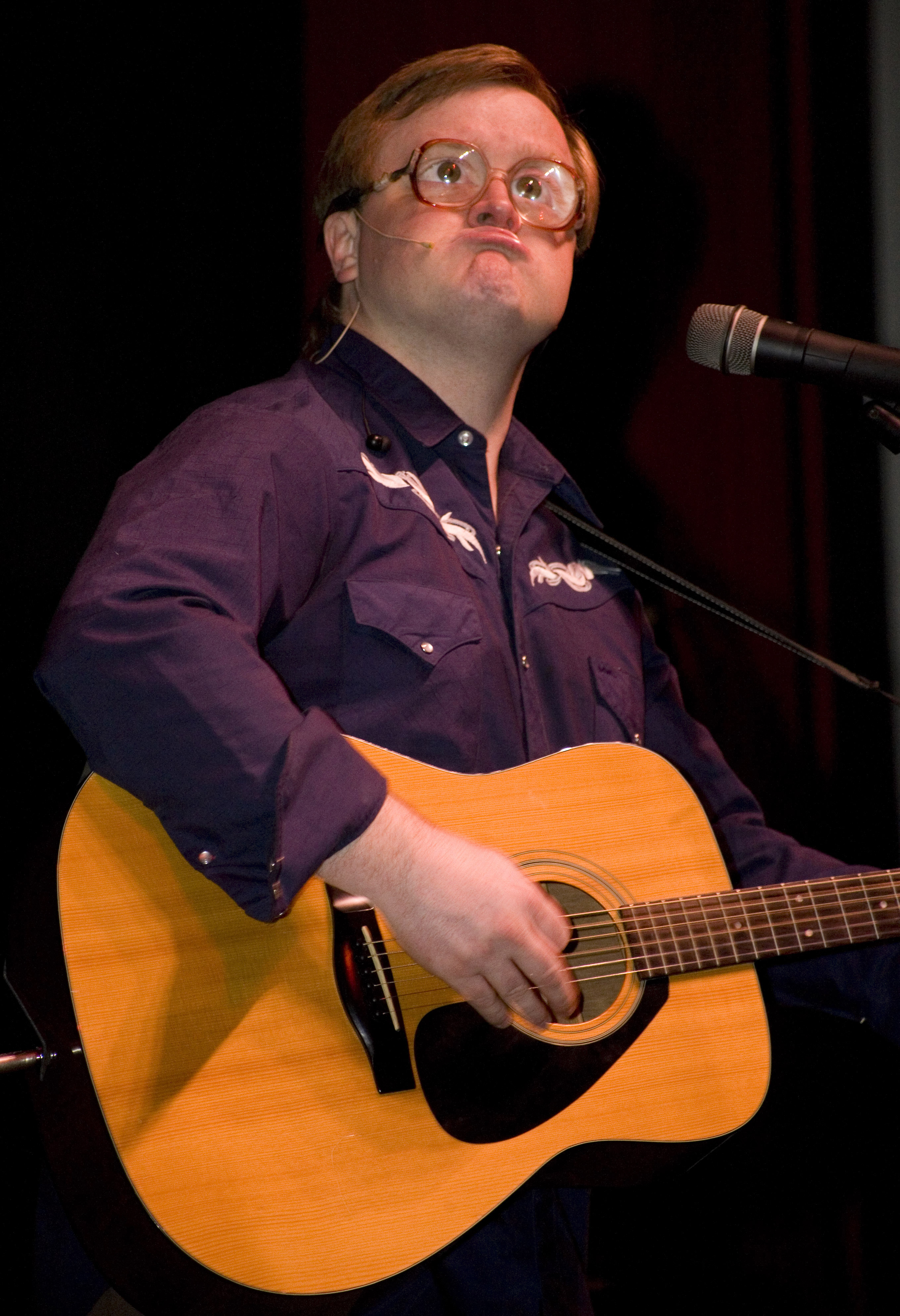
Mike Smith, Canadian actor ("Bubbles" on the Trailer Park Boys).

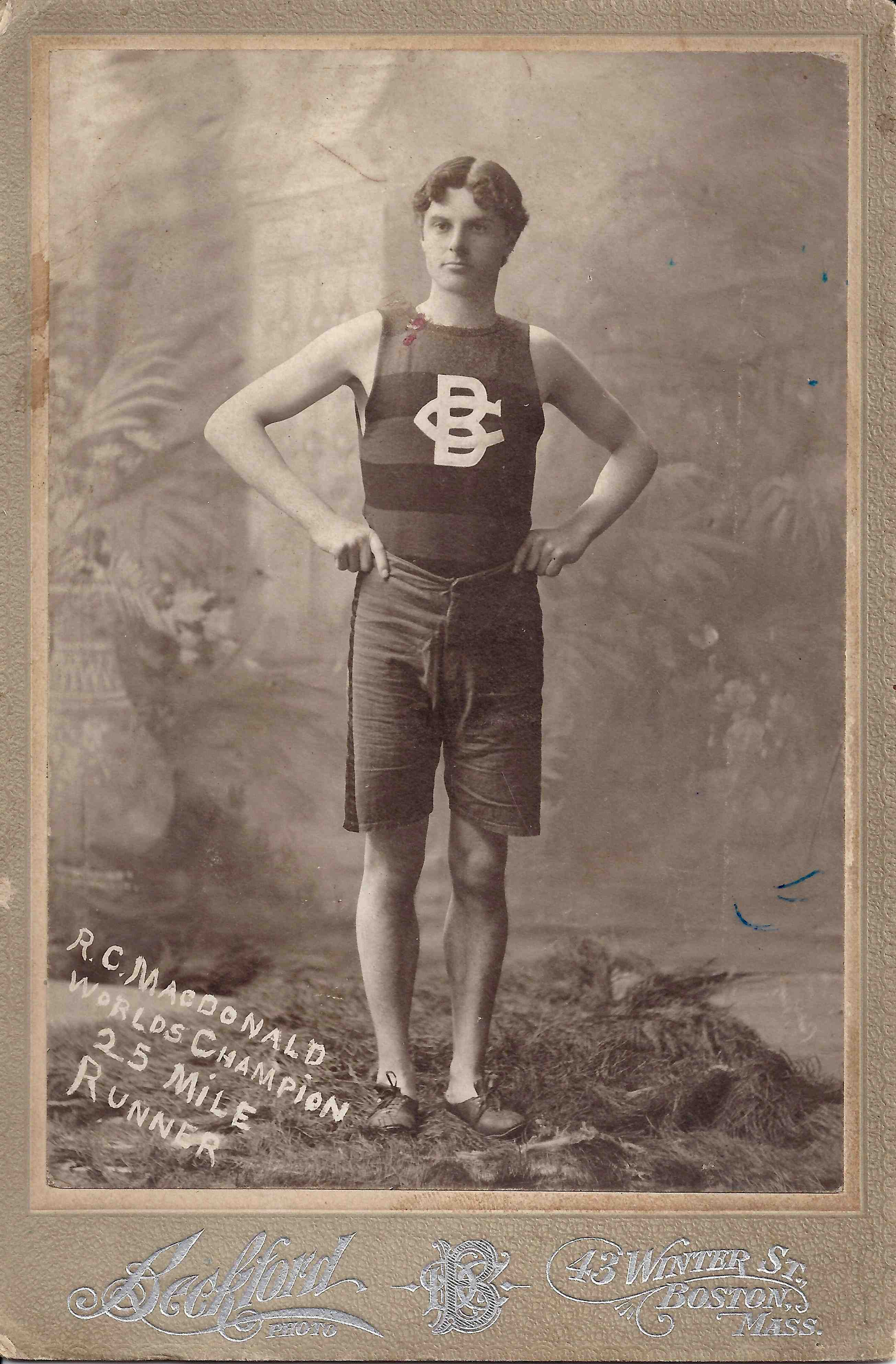
Ronald J. MacDonald, Olympic runner, Boston Marathon Champion in 1898.

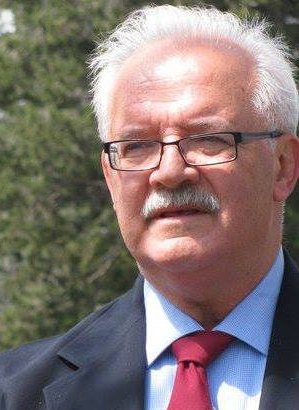
Sam Webb, leader of the Communist Party USA, 2000–2014.

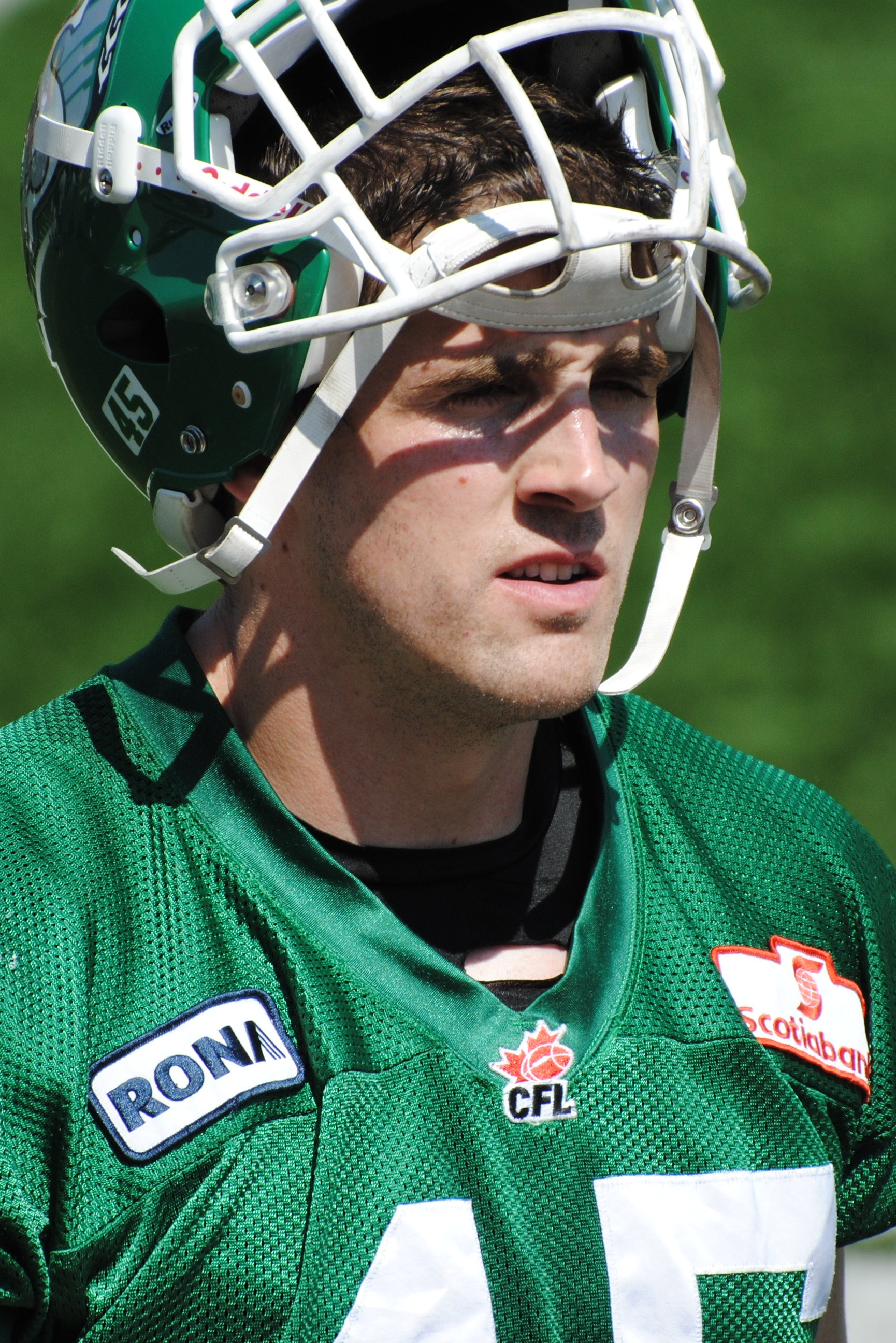
Mike McCullough, Canadian football linebacker for the Roughriders.

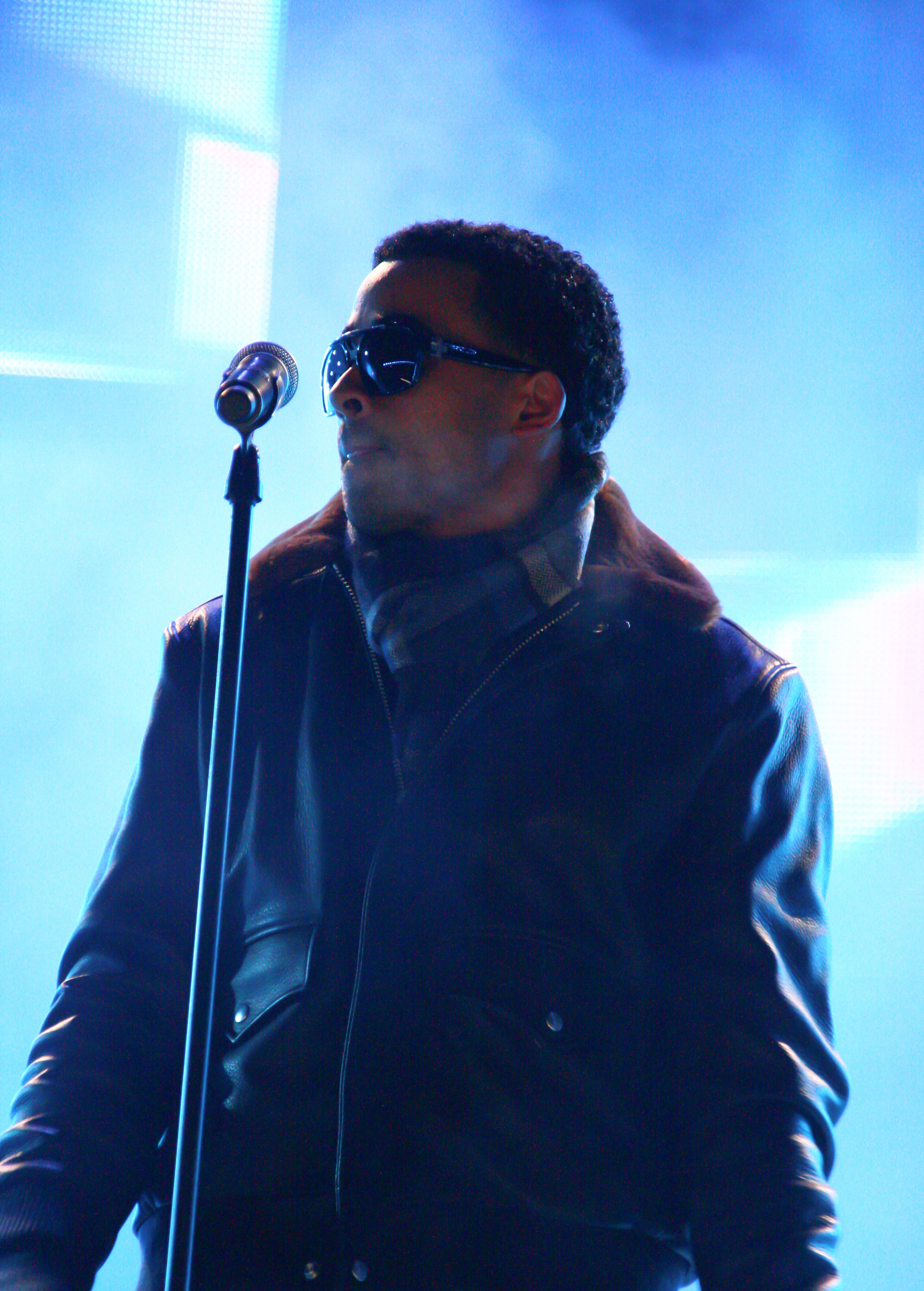
JRDN, Canadian R&B singer.

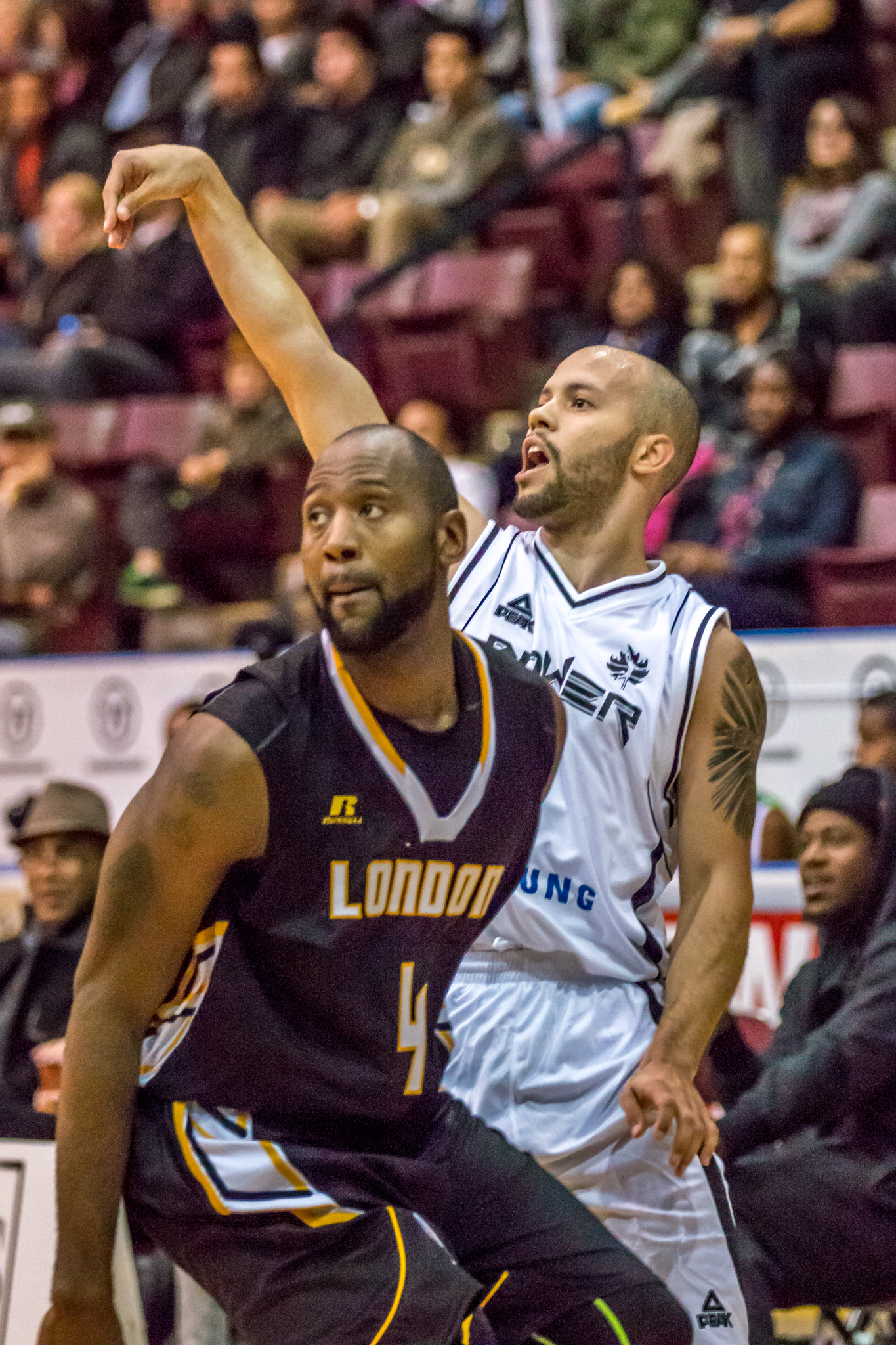
Tyrell Vernon, Canadian professional basketball player.

== Histories ==
- Tompkins, Jimmy (1921). Knowledge for the People: a call to St. Francis Xavier's College, Antigonish, N.S. OCLC 71768301.
- Cameron, James (1996). For the People: A History of St. Francis Xavier University. Montreal: McGill-Queen's University Press. ISBN 077351385X. OCLC 243586957.

== See also ==
- Antigonish Movement
- Higher education in Nova Scotia
- List of universities in Nova Scotia
- Canadian Interuniversity Sport
- Francis Xavier Plessis
