= ZNF300 =

Human protein-coding gene

Identifiers
- Aliases: ZNF300, zinc finger protein 300
- External IDs: OMIM: 612429; GeneCards: ZNF300

Gene location (Human)
Chr.	Chromosome 5 (human)
Band	5q33.1	Start	150,894,392 bp
Band	5q33.1	End	150,904,983 bp
RNA expression pattern
Bgee	Human / Mouse (ortholog); Top expressed in: ganglionic eminence; ventricular zone; Achilles tendon; gonad; left ovary; right ovary; testicle; metanephros; left lobe of thyroid gland; body of pancreas / n/a; More reference expression data
BioGPS	n/a
Gene ontology
Molecular function	DNA-binding transcription factor activity; DNA binding; protein binding; metal ion binding; nucleic acid binding; DNA-binding transcription activator activity, RNA polymerase II-specific; sequence-specific DNA binding; DNA-binding transcription factor activity, RNA polymerase II-specific
Cellular component	intracellular anatomical structure; nucleus; nucleolus
Biological process	regulation of transcription, DNA-templated; transcription, DNA-templated; transcription by RNA polymerase II; positive regulation of transcription by RNA polymerase II
Sources:Amigo / QuickGO
Orthologs
Databases	NCBI: entry; OMA: entry
Species	Human	Mouse
Entrez	91975	n/a
Ensembl	ENSG00000145908	n/a
UniProt	Q96RE9	n/a
RefSeq (mRNA)	NM_001172831; NM_001172832; NM_052860	n/a
RefSeq (protein)	NP_001166302; NP_001166303; NP_443092	n/a
Location (UCSC)	Chr 5: 150.89 – 150.9 Mb	n/a
PubMed search		n/a
- Wikidata
View/Edit Human

Zinc finger protein 300 is a protein that in humans is encoded by the ZNF300 gene. The protein encoded by this gene is a C2H2-type zinc finger DNA binding protein and a likely transcription factor.

It is antisense to the human gene, C16orf71, indicating possibility of regulated alternative expression.

== Clinical relevance ==
It is associated with Crohn's disease.
