= Very early onset inflammatory bowel disease =

- Specialty: Gastroenterology

Very early onset inflammatory bowel disease (VEOIBD) is a type of IBD which starts in people younger than 6 years of age. According to age we can distinguish more specifically two categories within the VEOIBD diagnosis - neonatal IBD (patients younger than 1 month) and infantile IBD (patients younger than 2 years old).

== Signs and symptoms ==
VEIOBD patients present with severe form of the disease that responds poorly to conventional therapies. The symptoms often include not only gastrointestinal tract, but also other tissues, such as pituitary gland, spleen, liver, skin, respiratory tract or blood.

On the other hand, other types of primary immunodeficiency can often manifest with IBD-like symptoms, too. These include the IPEX syndrome, Wiskott-Aldrich syndrome, XIAP syndrome or chronic granulomatous disease.

== Causes ==
Inflammatory bowel diseases (IBDs), such as Crohn's disease (CD) or Ulcerative Colitis (UC), are chronic inflammatory conditions of the gastrointestinal tract. Up-to-date findings show that the pathogenesis is influenced by both environmental and genetic factors. A considerable number of monogenic disorders can be found especially among patients with VEOIBD. Causal mutations can be found in genes involved in epithelial barrier formation (COL7A1, FERMT1), innate (CYBB, G6PC3), as well as the specific immune response and immune regulation (IL10, IL10RA, FOXP3).
