= PLVAP =

Protein-coding gene in the species Homo sapiens

Identifiers
- Aliases: PLVAP, FELS, PV-1, PV1, gp68, plasmalemma vesicle associated protein, DIAR10
- External IDs: OMIM: 607647; MGI: 1890497; GeneCards: PLVAP

Gene location (Human)
Chr.	Chromosome 19 (human)
Band	19p13.11	Start	17,351,450 bp
Band	19p13.11	End	17,377,342 bp

Gene location (Mouse)
Chr.	Chromosome 8 (mouse)
Band	8 B3.3|8 34.43 cM	Start	71,950,409 bp
Band	8 B3.3|8 34.43 cM	End	71,964,396 bp
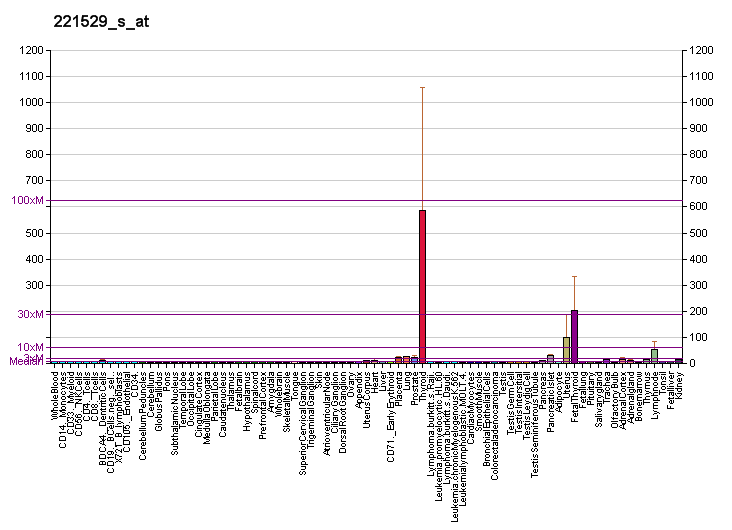
RNA expression pattern
Bgee	Human / Mouse (ortholog); Top expressed in: left lobe of thyroid gland; right lobe of thyroid gland; epithelium of colon; gallbladder; pericardium; cardia; tendon of biceps brachii; subcutaneous adipose tissue; spleen; fundus / Top expressed in: right lung; right lung lobe; mesenteric lymph nodes; atrium; right kidney; endothelial cell of lymphatic vessel; islet of Langerhans; left lung; spleen; internal carotid artery; More reference expression data
BioGPS	More reference expression data
Gene ontology
Molecular function	protein binding; protein homodimerization activity
Cellular component	cytoplasm; perinuclear region of cytoplasm; caveola; integral component of membrane; cell surface; plasma membrane; extracellular exosome; membrane
Biological process	tumor necrosis factor-mediated signaling pathway; protein kinase C signaling; MAPK cascade; positive regulation of cellular extravasation; developmental process
Sources:Amigo / QuickGO
Orthologs
Databases	NCBI: entry; OMA: entry
Species	Human	Mouse
Entrez	83483	84094
Ensembl	ENSG00000130300	ENSMUSG00000034845
UniProt	Q9BX97	Q91VC4
RefSeq (mRNA)	NM_031310	NM_032398
RefSeq (protein)	NP_112600	NP_115774
Location (UCSC)	Chr 19: 17.35 – 17.38 Mb	Chr 8: 71.95 – 71.96 Mb
PubMed search
- Wikidata
View/Edit Human	View/Edit Mouse

Plasmalemma vesicle-associated protein is a protein that in humans is encoded by the PLVAP gene.
