= List of University of Toronto buildings =

The University of Toronto is made up of several academic and administrative buildings across its three main campuses and various locations in the Greater Toronto Area of Ontario, Canada.

Note: The building codes are enclosed by square brackets for the simplicity to search.

== St. George campus ==
=== Current buildings ===
Name	Building Code	College or Faculty	Built	Architect	Notes	Image
30 Charles Street West	[C1]		1970	Tampold and Wells	Student family housing	
35 Charles Street West	[C2]		1970	Tampold and Wells	Student family housing	
39 Queen's Park Cres East (Sir W.T. White House)	[ML]	St. Michael's College	1903		Former home of the Centre for Medieval Studies	
40 Sussex Avenue	[SX]	Faculty of Kinesiology and Physical Education	1890		Former private home	
59 Queen's Park Cres East	[PI]	St. Michael's College			Houses the Pontifical Institute of Mediaeval Studies	
90 Wellesley Street West	[JP]	Faculty of Music (Formerly St. Michael's College)	1955		Secondary music building and jazz department	
88 College Street	[ZC]	Temerty Faculty of Medicine	1882		Formerly the Zion Congregational Church. Property purchased by the University of Toronto in 1948. Housed the Joint Centre for Bioethics.	
97 St. George Street			1889		Former private home; former home of the Department of Classics	
121 St. George Street	[IR]		1896	Langley & Burke	The house was originally a gift for Lillian May Gooderham, the daughter of George Gooderham, who was president of Gooderham and Worts. Previously housed the Media Centre until 1992, when it became the home of the Centre for Industrial Relations and Human Resources.	
162 St. George Street	[CO]	School of Continuing Studies				
215 Huron Street	[HU]		1961		Houses administrative offices	
229 College Street	[CZ]				Houses administrative offices	
246 Bloor Street West	[SK]	Factor-Inwentash Faculty of Social Work	1950		Former medical office building purchased by university	
254-256 McCaul Street	[RM]		1912			
263 McCaul Street	[OA]	Temerty Faculty of Medicine	1915	C.H. Bishop	Formerly headquarters of the Toronto Board of Education, called the Old Admin Building. Connected to the Health Sciences Building via an elevated walkway.	
370 Huron Street	[CA]		1884		Campus Co-Op Day Care Centre	
455 Spadina Avenue	[TT]					
665 Spadina Avenue	[XG]				Former meeting space for the Architecture and Visual Studies Student Union (AVSSU)	
700 University Avenue	[UY]	Department of Sociology (17th floor), Department of Statistical Sciences (9th floor)		Formerly "The Hydro building"	Floors are leased within the Intact Centre	
703 Spadina Avenue	[IA]		1890		Internal Audit Department; former private home	
371 Bloor Street West	[FE]				Houses the University of Toronto School	
Annesley Hall	[AN]	Victoria College	1902		Victoria College women's residence; designated National Historic Site of Canada	
Anthropology Building	[AP]	Faculty of Arts and Science	1963			
Astronomy & Astrophysics Building	[AB]	Faculty of Arts and Science	1963			
Back Campus Fields	[BK]	Faculty of Kinesiology and Physical Education				
Bahen Centre for Information Technology	[BA]		2001	Diamond Schmitt Architects		
Bancroft Building	[BF]	Faculty of Arts and Science	1926		Building absorbed the Robert Brown House, located on the east side of the building.	
Birge-Carnegie Library	[BC]	Victoria College	1910	Sproatt and Rolph	Victoria College and United Church archives	
Borden Building	[SB]/[NB]		1910 (north building), 1920 (south building)	George M. Miller	Originally the City Dairy Stables	
Brennan Hall	[BR]	St. Michael's College	1937, expanded 1967	Arthur W. Holmes		
Burwash Hall	[BW]	Victoria College	1913	Henry Sproatt	Dining hall	
Burwash Residence	[UB]/[LB]	Victoria College	1931		Student residence; divided into Upper and Lower Houses	
C. David Naylor Building	[NL]	Temerty Faculty of Medicine	1932		Formerly the Botany Building, and formerly the Tanz Neuroscience Building.	
Canadiana Gallery	[CG]	Munk School of Global Affairs and Public Policy	1950	Mathers and Haldenby	Formerly the Archives of Ontario 1951 to 1977	
Cardinal Flahiff Basilian Centre		St. Michael's College	1950		Houses the Canadian Catholic Bioethics Institute	
Carr Hall	[CR]	St. Michael's College	1954	Ernest Cormier		
Central Steam Plant	[ST]					
Chestnut Residence	[CN]	Faculty of Applied Science and Engineering (informally)	1971		Formerly the Colony Hotel, today a student residence. Though not official, this residence is usually reserved for engineering students as they are not affiliated with the colleges. When space is available, OCAD University students may live in Chestnut during the school year.	
Clara Benson Building	[BN]	Faculty of Kinesiology and Physical Education	1959		Part of the Athletic Centre	
Claude T. Bissell Building	[BL]		1971		Part of Robarts Library	
Convocation Hall	[CH]		1907	Pearson and Darling		
Cumberland House	[CU]		1860	Frederick W. Cumberland	Houses the Centre for International Experience	
D.L. Pratt Building	[PT]	Faculty of Applied Science and Engineering	1965			
Daniels Building	[DA]	Faculty of Architecture, Landscape, and Design	1875	Smith & Gemmell	Former home of Knox College; finished renovations in 2017 to house the Faculty of Architecture.	
Dentistry Building	[DN]	Faculty of Dentistry	1959		On Edward St. south of campus, near Dundas St. and University Ave.	
Dr. Eric Jackman Institute of Child Study	[WR]	Ontario Institute for Studies in Education	1931		Located in The Annex north of campus. Formerly the Leighton Goldie McCarthy House.	
E.J. Pratt Library	[LH]	Victoria College	1961	Gordon S. Adamson Associates		
Early Learning Centre	[ER]		2003	Teeple Architects		
Earth Sciences Centre	[ES]		1989	A.J. Diamond, Donald Schmitt and Company and Bregman + Hamann Architects		
Edward Johnson Building	[EJ]	Faculty of Music	1961			
Elmsley Hall	[EH]	St. Michael's College	1955		Student residence	
Emmanuel College	[EM]	Victoria College	1931	Sproatt and Rolph	Postgraduate theological college affiliated with the United Church of Canada. Member of the Toronto School of Theology.	
Engineering Annex	[EA]	Faculty of Applied Science and Engineering	1920			
Enrolment Services	[AD]		1987		Enrolment services, financial aid & awards office	
Exam Centre	[EX]		1931			
Faculty Club	[FC]		1896	Benjamin Brown		
Falconer Hall	[FH]	Henry N.R. Jackman Faculty of Law	1901	Sproatt and Rolph		
Fasken Martineau Building	[LG]				Home of Downtown Legal Services	
Fields Institute for Research in Math Science	[FI]		1995	KPMB Architects		
Fisher House	[FS]	St. Michael's College				
FitzGerald Building	[FG]	Temerty Faculty of Medicine	1927	Mathers and Haldenby	Undergoing renovations as of 2021	
Flavelle House	[LW]	Henry N.R. Jackman Faculty of Law	1902	Darling and Pearson	Historic home of the Faculty of Law. Conjoined and shares a building code with the newer Jackman Law Building	
Founders House	[BH]	St. Michael's College				
Gage Building	[GA]	Division of Occupational and Environmental Health, Dalla Lana School of Public Health	1915	Charles S. Cobb and Frank A. Spangenberg	Constructed by Sir William James Gage as the headquarters of the National Sanitarium Association. Purchased by the university in 1971.	
Galbraith Building	[GB]	Faculty of Applied Science and Engineering	1960			
George Ignatieff Theatre	[GI]	Trinity College	1979			
Gerald Larkin Building	[LA]	Trinity College	1961	Somerville, McMurrich & Oxley		
Gerstein Science Information Centre	[SM]		1892	David B. Dick	Originally the main campus library. The Sigmund Samuel Library building.	
Gilson House	[GH]	St. Michael's College				
Goldring Centre for High Performance Sport	[GO]	Faculty of Kinesiology and Physical Education	2014	MacLennan Jaunkalns Miller Architects and Patkau Architects		
Goldring Student Centre	[GC]	Victoria College	1951 Renovated 2013	Fleury & Arthur Architects Moriyama + Teshima	Formerly and colloquially known as Wymilwood.	
Graduate House	[GD]		2000	Thom Mayne	Student residence	
Graduate Students' Union	[GU]		1920		Former site of the Baracca Club and Knox Youth Centre, current home of the Graduate Students' Union, Harvest Noon Cafe and the GSU Pub.	
Graham Library	[GR]					
Hart House	[HH]		1919	Henry Sproatt	Arts and culture centre for the tri-campus community	
Haultain Building	[HA]		1904, top three floors added in 1930		Formerly the Mill Building	
Health Sciences Building	[HS]	Temerty Faculty of Medicine Lawrence Bloomberg Faculty of Nursing Dalla Lana School of Public Health	1961	E.C. Etherington	Formerly the Toronto Board of Education, Education Centre	
Innis College	[IN]	Innis College	1976	Jack Diamond and Barton Myers	One of the first instances of Postmodern architecture on campus. It incorporates an old Victorian-era house into the rest of the building complex. This building contains the College's main classrooms, cinema and admin offices since it opened in 1976.	
Innis College Student Residence	[IS]	Innis College	1994	Zeidler Roberts Partnership	Student residence	
Isabel Bader Theatre	[BT]	Victoria College	2000	Lett/Smith Architects		
John M. Kelly Library	[KL]	St. Michael's College	1969	John J. Farrugia	Houses the Pontifical Institute of Mediaeval Studies.	
J. Robert S. Prichard Alumni House	[DR]		1958			
Jackman Humanities Building	[JH]		1929	Marani, Lawson and Paisley	Formerly the Medical Arts Building	
Jackman Law Building	[LW]	Henry N.R. Jackman Faculty of Law	2016	Hariri Pontarini Architects	Conjoined and shares a building code with the Flavelle House. Houses the Bora Laskin Law Library and a University of Toronto Bookstore location.	
Knox College	[KX]		1915		Postgraduate theological college affiliated with the Presbyterian Church in Canada. Member of the Toronto School of Theology. The southwest corner of the building houses the Nona Macdonald Visitors Centre.	
Koffler House	[KP]		1990		Houses various Student Life services.	
Koffler Student Services Centre	[KS]		1906	Alfred H. Chapman	Building was originally home to Toronto's main public library. Houses various administrative offices and a University of Toronto Bookstore location.	
Lash Miller Chemical Laboratories	[LM]		1963			
Leslie L. Dan Pharmacy Building	[PB]	Leslie Dan Faculty of Pharmacy	2004	Norman Foster		
Lillian Massey Building	[LI]	Victoria College	1912	George M. Miller	Home of the Department of Classics and the Centre for Medieval Studies	
Loretto College	[LC]	St. Michael's College	1958		Women's residence	
Louis B. Stewart Observatory	[SO]		1855 (disassembled, relocated and rebuilt in 1908)	Frederick Cumberland and William G. Storm.	Former home of the University of Toronto Students' Union. Originally located opposite Convocation Hall before being relocated.	
Macdonald-Mowat House	[MM]		1872			
Margaret Addison Hall	[MG]	Victoria College	1958		Student residence	
Maritain House	—N/a	St. Michael's College			Student residence	
Massey College	[MA]	Massey College	1963	Ronald Thom	Selective postgraduate residence and fellows community. Founded by The Massey Foundation by the Rt Hon. Vincent Massey	
Max Gluskin House	[GE]		1898, significant expansion in 2008		Houses the Department of Economics	
McCorkell House	[MZ]	St. Michael's College			Student residence	
McLennan Physical Laboratories	[MP]		1967	Shore & Moffat		
McMurrich Building	[MR]	Temerty Faculty of Medicine	1923	Darling and Pearson	Formerly the Anatomy Building. Now houses various administrative offices.	
Mechanical Engineering Building	[MC]	Faculty of Applied Science and Engineering	1909	Darling and Pearson	Formerly The Thermodynamics Building	
Medical Sciences Building	[MS]	Temerty Faculty of Medicine	1969		Site of the old Biology Building c. 1888 and interim home to the University of Toronto Scarborough from 1964 to 1966	
More House	[MH]	St. Michael's College				
Lassonde Mining Building	[MB]	Faculty of Applied Science and Engineering	1905	Francis R. Heakes	Renamed after Pierre Lassonde for his philanthropic contributions.	
Luella Massey Studio Theatre	[GM]		1914	Maurice Klein	Originally St. Paul's Evangelical Lutheran Church	
Morrison Hall	[MO]	University College	2004	Zeidler Partnership Architects	Student residence	
Munk School for Global Affairs at the Observatory	[MK]	Munk School of Global Affairs and Public Policy	1908-1909	Edmund Burke and John C. B. Horwood	Formerly the Dominion Meteorological Building, and former Admissions Office.	
Munk School of Global Affairs & Public Policy at Trinity	[MU]	Trinity College Munk School of Global Affairs and Public Policy	1909, rebuilt in 2000	Eden Smith, rebuilt by KPMB Architects		
Muzzo Family Alumni Hall	[AH]	St. Michael's College	1923			
Myhal Centre for Engineering Innovation & Entrepreneurship	[MY]	Faculty of Applied Science and Engineering	2018	Montgomery Sisam Architects and Feilden Clegg Bradley Studios		
New College (III) Residence	[NR]	New College	2003	Saucier + Perrotte Architects	Student residence	
Newman Centre	—N/a		1891	David Roberts		
North West Chiller Plant					Located at 50 Sussex Ave.	
Northrop Frye Hall	[NF]	Victoria College	1967	Adamson Associates		
Oak House Residence	—N/a		2025	Diamond Schmitt Architects	At NW corner of Spadina Ave. & Sussex Ave. 23-storey student residence to house 508 students.	
Odette (Louis) Hall	[OH]	St. Michael's College	1852	William Hay		
Ontario Institute for Studies in Education	[OI]	Ontario Institute for Studies in Education	1969	Kenneth R. Cooper		
Phelan House	[PH]	St. Michael's College	1897	Langley & Langley		
Physical Geography Building (45 St. George Street)	[PG]		1926	Darling and Pearson	Formerly the Forestry Building	
Ramsay Wright Laboratories	[RW]		1965			
Regis College	[RG]		1926		Postgraduate theological college affiliated with the Society of Jesus. Member of Toronto School of Theology.	
Rehabilitation Sciences Building	[RU]	Temerty Faculty of Medicine	1958		Located south of campus on University Ave.	
Robarts Library	[RL]		1973	Mathers & Haldenby Architects with consultation from Warner, Burns, Toan & Lund Diamond Schmitt Architects (Robarts Common)	Formally known as John P. Robarts Library Building.	
Rosebrugh Building	[RS]	Faculty of Applied Science and Engineering	1921	Darling and Pearson	Formerly the Electrical Building. Houses the Institute of Biomaterials and Biomedical Engineering.	
Rotman School of Management	[RT]		1995, expansion in 2012	Zeidler Partnership Architects, expansion by KPMB Architects		
Rowell Jackman Hall	[RJ]	Victoria College	1993		Student residence	
Sam Sorbara Hall	[SR]	St. Michael's College	2000		Student residence	
Sandford Fleming Building	[SF]	Faculty of Applied Science and Engineering	1907, rebuilt after 1977 fire	Darling and Pearson	Named after Sir Sandford Fleming. Home to most engineering social events.	
School of Continuing Studies	[CS]	School of Continuing Studies	1950, rebuilt in 2004			
School of Graduate Studies	[GS]	School of Graduate Studies	1891			
Schwartz Reisman Innovation Campus	—N/a		2023	Weiss/Manfredi Teeple Architects	Home to the Vector Institute	
Sidney Smith Hall	[SS]	Faculty of Arts and Science	1961	John B. Parkin Associates		
Simcoe Hall	[SI]		1924	Darling and Pearson	Administration building named for John Graves Simcoe. Houses the Office of the President and Office of the Chancellor among other executive offices.	
Sir Daniel Wilson Residence	[SD]	University College	1954	Mathers and Haldenby	Student residence	
Soldiers' Tower	[TR]		1924	Sproatt and Rolph	Attached to Hart House	
St. Basil's Church	[BS]	St. Michael's College	1856	William Hay		
St. Hilda's College	[HI]	Trinity College	1938	George and Moorehouse	Student residence	
Stephenson House	[SN]/[LH]	Victoria College	1884		Victoria University HR Department	
Stewart Building	[EP]		1894	E. J. Lennox	Home of the Rotman executive development programme.	
Student Commons	[SU]		1908	Superkul (2016 renovation)	Former Architecture Building, renovated in 2016; student centre for the St. George campus operated by the University of Toronto Students' Union	
Sullivan House	[SV]	St. Michael's College			Student residence	
Sussex Court	[SC]		1903	James A. Ellis	Student residence	
Teefy Hall	[TF]	St. Michael's College	1935			
Terrence Donnelly Centre for Cellular and Biomolecular Research	[DC]	Temerty Faculty of Medicine	2004	Peter Clewes		
Thomas Fisher Rare Book Library	[RB]		1973			
Toronto School of Theology	[TH]		1900		Former private home	
Transitional Year Programme (123 St. George Street)	[WA]		1899	Burke & Horwood	Former private home, known as T.M. Harris House.	
Trinity College	[TC]	Trinity College	1925	Pearson and Darling	Along side being a federated college of the university, it is also a postgraduate theological college affiliated with the Anglican Church of Canada and is a member of the Toronto School of Theology.	
University College	[UC]	University College	1858	Frederick Cumberland and William G. Storm.		
University College Union	[UP]	University College	1885		Former private home	
University of Toronto Schools (371 Bloor Street West)	[FE]		1910	Darling and Pearson	Secondary school associated with the University of Toronto.	
Varsity Arena	[VA]		1927	T. R. Loudon along with Pearson and Darling	Part of the Varsity Centre & Arena complex, shares building code with Varsity Stadium.	
Varsity Pavilion	[VP]		2009			
Varsity Stadium	[VA]		2007	Diamond Schmitt Architects	Part of the Varsity Centre & Arena complex, shares building code with Varsity Arena.	
Victoria College	[VC]	Victoria College	1892	William G. Storm	Also known as Old Vic	
Wallberg Building	[WB]	Faculty of Applied Science and Engineering	1949		Houses the Department of Chemical Engineering and the Department of Material Science and Engineering.	
Warren Stevens Building	[WS]	Faculty of Kinesiology and Physical Education	1980	Prack and Prack	Main building of the Athletic Centre	
Wetmore Hall	[WE]	New College	1965	Fairfield and Dubois	Student residence	
Whitney Hall	[WT]	University College	1931	Mathers and Haldenby	Student residence	
Wilson Hall	[WI]	New College	1969	Fairfield and Dubois	Student residence and food cafeteria	
Sheptytsky House (previously Windle House)	[WN]	St. Michael's College	1897	John M. Lyle		
Woodsworth College	[WW]	Woodsworth College	1992, but incorporating earlier structures	Barton Myers Associates Ltd. and KPMB Architects		
Woodsworth College Residence	[WO]	Woodsworth College	2003	Peter Clewes	Student residence	
Wycliffe College	[WY]		1891	David B. Dick	Postgraduate theological college with values rooted in evangelical Anglican traditions. Member of the Toronto School of Theology.	

=== Demolished/former buildings ===
Name	College or Faculty	Built	Demolished	Architect	Notes	Image
49 St. George Street		1900			Former private home; housed the Transitional Year Programme. Demolished to construct the Myhal Centre for Engineering Innovation & Entrepreneurship	
92 College St.	Faculty of Medicine	1920	2016		Demolished 2016 and space converted into a surface parking lot	
713 Spadina Avenue	Faculty of Kinesiology and Physical Education				Former private home; building has since been demolished and replaced with an alleyway behind University of Toronto Schools	
Argyll House		1918	1930		100 Queen's Park	
Banting Institute	Temerty Faculty of Medicine	1930	2025		Replaced by the Schwartz Reisman Innovation Campus	
Best Institute		1954	2020		Replaced by the Schwartz Reisman Innovation Campus	
Biological Building		1890	c. 1950	D. B. Dick		
Chemistry Building		1895	c. 1950	D. B. Dick		
CIUT Radio Building		1892	2009		Demolished in 2009. Held within Hart House	
Gymnasium		1892	1912	D. B. Dick	Demolished for the construction of Hart House	
King's College		1845	1886	Thomas Young	After the construction of University College, this building was used as a provincial asylum. Located on the present site of the Ontario Legislative Building	
Medical Building (renamed Moss Hall in 1880)		1851	1888	Thomas Young	Demolished to make way for the Biological Building	
Medical Building	Faculty of Medicine	1904	c. 1968			
Robert Brown House		1890			Now absorbed as a part of Bancroft Building. Originally located on Huron Ave.	
School of Practical Science (SPS)	Faculty of Applied Science and Engineering	1878	1966	Kivas Tully	Also known as Skule or Little Red Skulehouse. Located where the Medical Science Building stands today	
St. George Graduate Residence		1926	2002	Marani Ferdinand	Demolished in 2002 at the corner of Bloor and St. George	

== Scarborough campus ==
=== Current buildings ===
Name	Building Code	Department	Built	Architect	Notes	Image
Academic Resource Centre	[AC]		2003	Brian MacKay-Lyons	Houses the Doris McCarthy Gallery, U of T Scarborough Library, and a near-500-seat lecture hall, AC223.	
Arts and Administration Building	[AA]	Department of Arts, Culture and Media	2005	Montgomery Sisam Architects	Houses the campus' seat of governance. It contains music and visual arts studios, a 300-seat lecture hall, and a council chamber. This building also acts as the front-facing entrance to the campus.	
Bladen Wing	[BV]		1972	John Andrews	Houses classrooms, computer labs, and study spaces. Named after Vincent Bladen, former dean of the Faculty of Arts and Science.	
Coach House	[CH]				Located at the Lower Campus.	
Dome Structure	[DS]				Located at the Lower Campus.	
Environmental Science and Chemistry Building	[EV]	Department of Physical and Environmental Sciences	2015	Diamond Schmitt Architects	A research and education hub for Physical and Environmental Sciences.	
Geodesic Domes	[GD]		2024		Located at the Lower Campus. Designed as greenhouses that host the Indigenous entrepreneurship training program.	
Highland Hall	[HL]	Department of Anthropology, Department of Global Development Studies, Department of Health and Society, Department of Human Geography, Department of Political Science, and Department of Sociology	2018	Perkins & Will Architects	Renovated from the Athletics Centre after the completion of Toronto Pan Am Sports Centre. It has study spaces, student commons, and a 230-seat-lecture hall.	
Humanities Wing	[HW]	Department of English, and Department of Psychology	1966	John Andrews	Part of the Andrews Building, the original building of Scarborugh College.	
Indigenous House	[IH]		2026	Formline Architecture + Urbanism LGA Architectural Partners	In response to the Truth and Reconciliation Commission of Canada Final Report, the building will create inclusive and dedicated spaces for Indigenous learners, faculty and staff.	
Instructional Centre	[IC]	Department of Management, Department of Biological Sciences, and Department of Psychology	2011	Diamond Schmitt Architects	It features a rooftop garden with solar panels. It is also the first building to be added to the North Campus.	
Kina Wiiya Enadong Building	[KW]	Department of Historical and Cultural Studies, Department of Language Studies, and Department of Philosophy	2004		It was known as the Management Wing or the Social Sciences Building after 2011. Renamed to the current name as part of UTSC's Indigenous place-making.	
Maintenance Building	[MB]				Located at the Lower Campus.	
Miller Lash House	[ML]		1913	Edward B. Green Sr. (Green and Wicks)	Located at the Lower Campus. Former residence of the Principal of UTSC. Restored 2005. Designated a historical building in 1998.	
Myron and Berna Garron Health Sciences Complex	[AM]	U of T Scarborough Health Sciences Temerty Faculty of Medicine Lawrence Bloomberg Faculty of Nursing	2026	Diamond Schmitt Architects MVRDV	Home to the Scarborough Academy of Medicine and Integrated Health (SAMIH) and a location of Discovery Pharmacy.	
N'sheemaehn Child Care Centre	[CC]		1990		It provides day care to the children of students, staff, faculty, and the community.	
Portable	[PO]				Portable 102 is located behind the Kina Wiiya Enadong Building.	
Retail and Parking Commons			September 4, 2026	Behnisch Architekturbüro gh3*	Mixed-use building with parking garage and retail space. Houses a University of Toronto Bookstore location.	
Sam Ibrahim Building	[IA]	Department of Computer and Mathematical Sciences	2024	CEBRA Architecture and ZAS Architects & Interiors	Houses the Sam Ibrahim Centre for Inclusive Excellence in Entrepreneurship, Innovation and Leadership, Student Services, and the Department of Computer and Mathematical Sciences offices. It also includes the newest 500-seat lecture hall at UTSC–Arrow Group Inovation Hall.	
Science Research Building	[SY]	Department of Psychology	2008	Moriyama and Teshima Architects	It houses a 235-seat lecture hall, laboratories, and classrooms. It is connected to the end of the Science Wing.	
Science Wing	[SW]	Department of Biological Sciences, Department of Physical and Environmental Sciences, and Department of Psychology	1966	John Andrews	Part of the Andrews Building, the original building of Scarborough College.	
Student Centre	[SL]		2004		Student centre for the Scarborough campus; opened during UTSC's 40th anniversary. Houses a food court, campus radio station, study areas, a multi-faith chapel, equity office, a dentistry, and the Scarborough Campus Students' Union.	
Student Residence Centre	[SRC]				Located next to Joan Foley Hall and the South Townhouses.	
Toronto Pan Am Sports Centre	[AQ]		2014	NORR Ltd	Built to host events for the 2015 Pan American Games and Parapan American Games. Replaced the Athletics Centre after its renovation. It provides sports venues such as a gymnasium for UTSC students and the public.	
Residence
Aspen Hall	Block A	—N/a	1973		A row of townhouses located at the South Residence.	
Birch Hall	Block B	—N/a	1973		A row of townhouses located at the South Residence.	
Cedar Hall	Block C	—N/a	1973		A row of townhouses located at the South Residence.	
Dogwood Hall	Block D	—N/a	1973		A row of townhouses located at the South Residence.	
Elm Hall	Block E	—N/a	1973		A row of townhouses located at the South Residence.	
Fir Hall	Block F	—N/a	1984		A row of townhouses located at the South Residence.	
Grey Pine Hall	Block G	—N/a	1984		A row of townhouses located at the South Residence.	
Harmony Commons	Block N	—N/a	2023		Student Residence	
Hickory Hall	Block H	—N/a	1984		A row of townhouses located at the South Residence.	
Ironwood Hall	Block I	—N/a	1984		A row of townhouses located at the South Residence.	
Joan Foley Hall	[JF]	—N/a	2003		Apartment-style student residence. Named after Joan Foley, U of T's first female provost and UTSC's first female principal.	
Juniper Hall	Block J	—N/a	1989		A row of townhouses located at the North Residence.	
Koa Hall	Block K	—N/a	1989		A row of townhouses located at the North Residence.	
Larch Hall	Block L	—N/a	1989		A row of townhouses located at the North Residence.	
Maple Hall	Block M	—N/a	1989		A row of townhouses located at the North Residence.	

== Mississauga campus ==
=== Current buildings ===
Name	Building Code	Department	Built	Architect	Notes	Image
Academic Annex	[AX]	Human Resources Office of Communications Budget, Planning and Finance	2010		Replaced Thomas Cottage.	
Alumni House	[WC]	Business Services Parking and Transportation	1922		Also known as the Old Erindale Public School. Designated a Historic Place under the Ontario Heritage Act on September 12, 1983. Purchased by the university in 2005.	
Central Utilities Plant	[C3]		1968	Raymond Moriyama		
Communication, Culture and Technology Building	[CC]	Institute of Communication, Culture, Information and Technology	2004	Saucier + Perrotte Architectes	Also known as the CCT Building	
Deerfield Hall	[DH]	Department of Mathematical and Computational Sciences Department of Psychological and Brain Sciences	2014	Perkins + Will	Phase 1 of the reconstructed North Building.	
Erindale Hall	[R1]	—N/a	2003		Student residence	
Erindale Studio Theatre	[DW]	Department of English and Drama	1968		Originally a garage and renovated into a blackbox theatre in 1993.	
Forensic Anthropology Field School	[C6]	Institute of Forensic Sciences	1890		Originally the cottage of Charlotte Schreiber. Also known as the Forensic Crime Scene House (formerly the Artist's Cottage). Acquired by the university in 1963 and used for the forensics program at UTM.	
Grounds Building	[GF]		2011		Built where the Geomorphology Lab once stood.	
Hazel McCallion Academic Learning Centre	[HM]		2006	Shore Tilbe Irwin & Partners|	Houses the UTM Library. Building is named after former Mississauga mayor Hazel McCallion.	
Innovation Complex	[KN]	Department of Economics Institute for Management and Innovation	2014	Moriyama & Teshima Architects	Houses the Office of the Registrar and the Blackwood Gallery. Building shares a code and is conjoined with the Kaneff Centre.	
Instructional Centre	[IB]	—N/a	2011	Shore Tilbe Irwin & Partners		
Kaneff Centre	[KN]	Department of Management	1992		Building shares a code and is conjoined with the Innovation Complex. Location of the Blackwood Gallery.	
Leacock Lane Residence	[R2]	—N/a	1986			
Lislehurst	[C8]	—N/a	1885		Built by the family of Charlotte Schreiber. Official residence of the UTM principal. Also known as the Principal's Residence, it was designated a Historic Place under the Ontario Heritage Act on September 23, 1985.	
Maanjiwe nendamowinan	[MN]	Department of English and Drama Department of Language Studies Department of Historical Studies Department of Philosophy Department of Political Science Department of Sociology Institute for the Study of University Pedagogy	2018	Perkins + Will	Phase 2 of the reconstructed North Building.	
MaGrath Valley Residence	[R3]	—N/a	1989			
McLuhan Court Residence	[R4]	—N/a	1976		Named after professor Marshall McLuhan.	
New Residence Building		—N/a	2026	Montgomery Sisam Architects / Christensen & Co	Temporary name	
Oscar Peterson Hall	[R5]	Residence Services Desk Student Housing and Residence Life	2007		The campus residence dining hall, Colman Commons, is on the first floor.	
Paleomagnetism Lab	[C9]		1967		Decommissioned in April 2019.	
Putnam Place Residence	[R6]	—N/a	1983			
Recreation, Athletics and Wellness Centre	[RA]	Department of Recreation, Athletics and Wellness	2006	Shore Tilbe Irwin & Partners	More commonly known as the RAWC	
Research Greenhouse	[BG]		2015			
Roy Ivor Hall	[R7]	—N/a	1998		Student residence	
Schreiberwood Residence	[R8]	—N/a	1973			
Science Building	[SB]	Centre for Medicinal Chemistry Institute of Forensic Sciences	2024	KieranTimberlake		
Student Centre	[XR]	—N/a	1999		Student centre for the Mississauga campus; headquarters of the University of Toronto Mississauga Students' Union	
Terrence Donnelly Health Sciences Complex	[HB]	Temerty Faculty of Medicine Department of Anthropology Biomedical Communications Program	2011	Kongats Architects Toronto		
William G. Davis Building	[DV]	Accessibility Services Career Centre Centre for Student Engagement Department of Biology Department of Geography, Geomatics and Environment Department of Chemical and Physical Sciences International Education Centre Health and Counselling Centre	1973	Raymond Moriyama	Formerly known as the South Building. Houses the UTM campus administration, student services, a food court, lecture halls, laboratories, and a University of Toronto Bookstore location.	

=== Demolished/former buildings ===
Name	Department	Built	Demolished	Architect	Notes	Image
Ackworth House	—N/a				Male student residence.	
Colman House			Before 2008		Replaced by Oscar Peterson Hall. Named for John S. Colman, first dean of UTM. Used as UTM's first student centre.	
Dobratz House	—N/a				Male student residence.	
Erindale Academic Plaza		1974	Before 1999		Also known as the Crossroads Building (replaced by the UTM Student Centre).	
Hastie House	—N/a				Female student residence.	
McGill House	—N/a				Male student residence.	
North Building		1967	2015		First building at UTM, intended to be temporary. Replaced by Deerfield Hall (2014) and Maanjiwe nendamowinan (2018).	
Robinson House	—N/a				Male student residence.	
Thomas Cottage			2010		Replaced by Academic Annex.	

== Other ==
Name	Building Code	College or Faculty	Built	Architect	Notes	Image
93 Highland Avenue	—N/a	—N/a	c. 1908–1910	Wickson and Gregg	Official residence of the president of the University of Toronto	
Aerospace Building	[AS]	Faculty of Applied Science and Engineering			Used by the University of Toronto Institute for Aerospace Studies (UTIAS)	
