= Kaneff Centre and Innovation Complex =

Conjoined buildings at the University of Toronto Mississauga

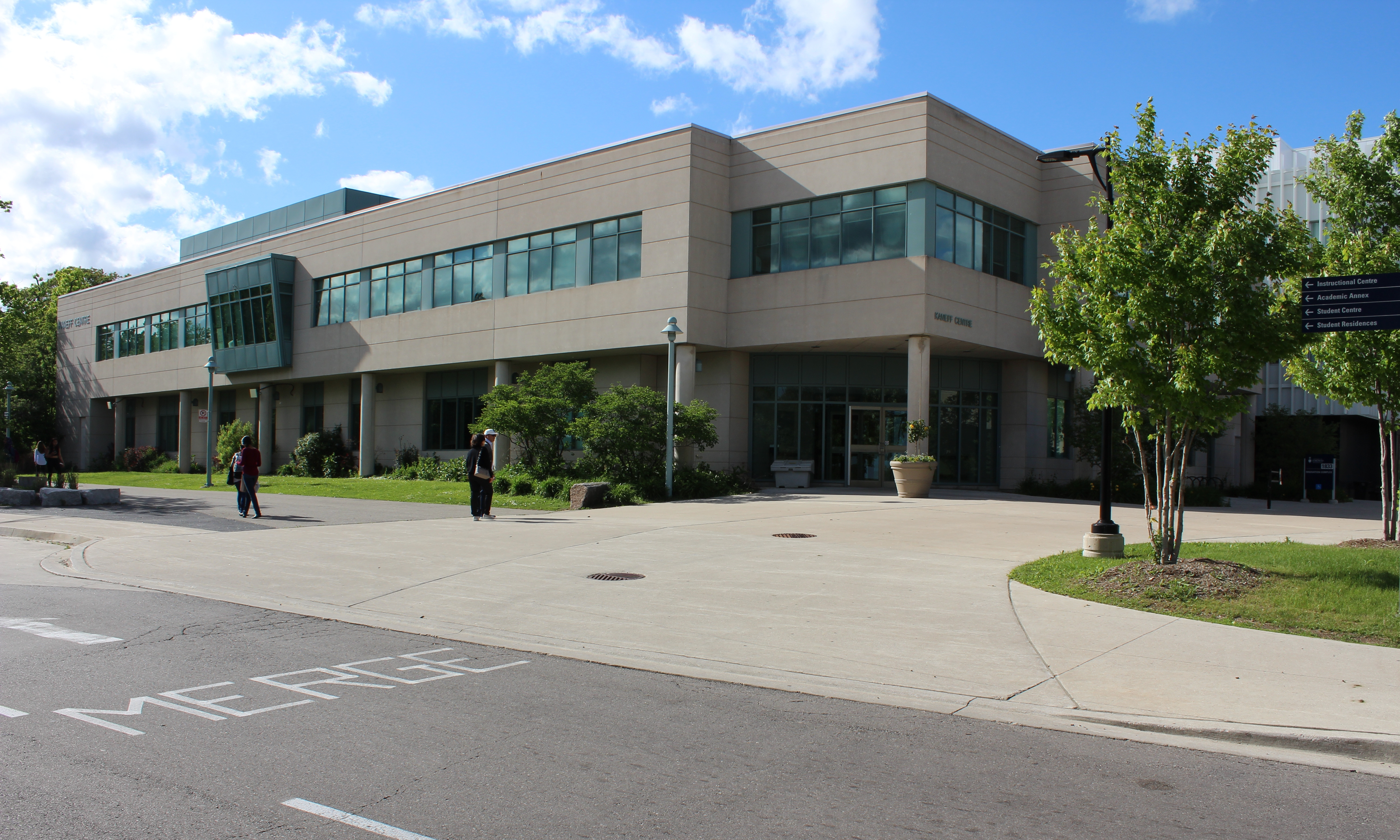
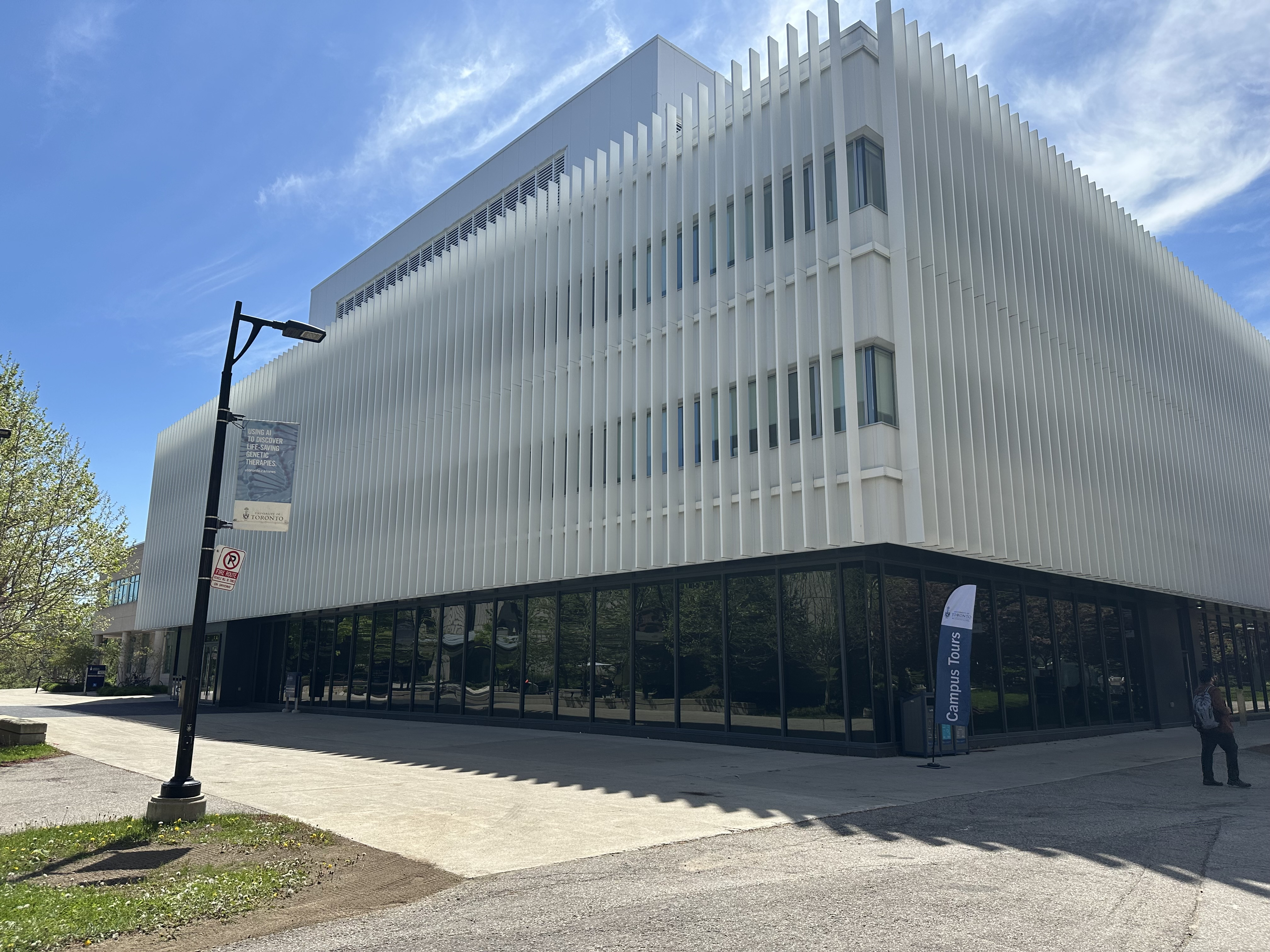
- Exterior of the Kaneff Centre in 2018 Exterior of the Innovation Complex in 2026

General information
- Location: 1833 Inner Circle, Mississauga, Ontario, Canada
- Coordinates: 43°32′54″N 79°39′47″W
- Named for: Ignat Kaneff (Kaneff Centre)
- Opening: 1992; 34 years ago (Kaneff Centre); 2014; 12 years ago (Innovation Complex)
- Cost: $29.7 million (Innovation Complex)
- Owner: University of Toronto

Other information
- Public transit: UTM bus terminal

The Kaneff Centre and Innovation Complex (Note: The Kaneff Centre and Innovation Complex share the same building code (KN) and street address. The latter is an expansion of the former.) are two conjoined academic buildings of the University of Toronto located on its Mississauga campus in Mississauga, Ontario, Canada. The Kaneff Centre opened in 1992 and houses the Blackwood Gallery and the Department of Management. The Innovation Complex is a $29.7-million expansion of the building completed in 2014 that houses the campus registrar's office, the Department of Economics and the Institute for Management and Innovation (IMI). The buildings share the municipal address of 1833 Inner Circle.

The Kaneff Centre is adjacent to the University of Toronto Mississauga bus terminal, a hub for several local and express MiWay city bus routes.

== Construction ==
The Kaneff Centre for Management and Social Sciences opened in 1992 as one of the first new academic buildings on the University of Toronto's Erindale Campus (now known as the University of Toronto Mississauga) since the South Building in 1973, and the oldest still standing apart from the South Building. The Kaneff Centre housed the political science, economics, commerce, and management programs and was shaped as a horseshoe with a circular courtyard in the middle. It was named for Bulgarian-Canadian business magnate and philanthropist Ignat Kaneff who was the first to donate $1 million to UTM.

=== Expansion ===
Following substantial growth in the campus's student population, plans were developed in 2011 to expand the Kaneff Centre with Moriyama & Teshima Architects chosen for the design. The structure, called the Innovation Complex, was completed in August 2014 and built as an infill where the courtyard was originally. The circular space became a domed rotunda used for speaking events and ceremonies. In total, the expansion added 65,300 square feet of space, tripling the facility’s capacity and creating space to house the newly established Institute for Management and Innovation. Also added was an underground tunnel connecting the complex to the William G. Davis Building. The city of Mississauga contributed $10 million to the project's funding.

== Facilities ==
The Kaneff Centre portion of the complex is mainly occupied by the Department of Management since the Department of Political Science moved to Maanjiwe nendamowinan. The Department of Economics and Institute for Management and Innovation (IMI), occupy the upper floors of the Innovation Complex, with the divisional office of the registrar's main service desk located in the rotunda.

== Blackwood Gallery ==
The Blackwood Gallery, located in the Kaneff Centre, is the flagship gallery space of The Blackwood, a public contemporary art gallery based at the University of Toronto Mississauga that maintains public artworks and light box exhibits around the campus. It also operates the E-Gallery (stylized as e|gallery), on the ground floor of the Communication, Culture and Technology (CCT) building and four lightbox exhibits throughout UTM, including the Bernie Miller Lightbox outside the William G. Davis Building. Its annual exhibitions include work by students in a joint program of the University of Toronto and Sheridan College.

The Blackwood Gallery maintains a permanent collection of over 450 works of Canadian contemporary art with a focus on pieces created by Ontario-based and Indigenous artists, including David Blackwood, Kenojuak Ashevak, Pitseolak Ashoona, Carl Beam, Rebecca Belmore, Vera Frenkel, Mary Pratt, and Lucy Qinnuayuak. A project to upgrade its permanent collection storage and preservation facilities was completed in 2014 during the construction of the Innovation Complex.

== See also ==
- List of University of Toronto buildings
