= William G. Davis Building =

Building at the University of Toronto Mississauga

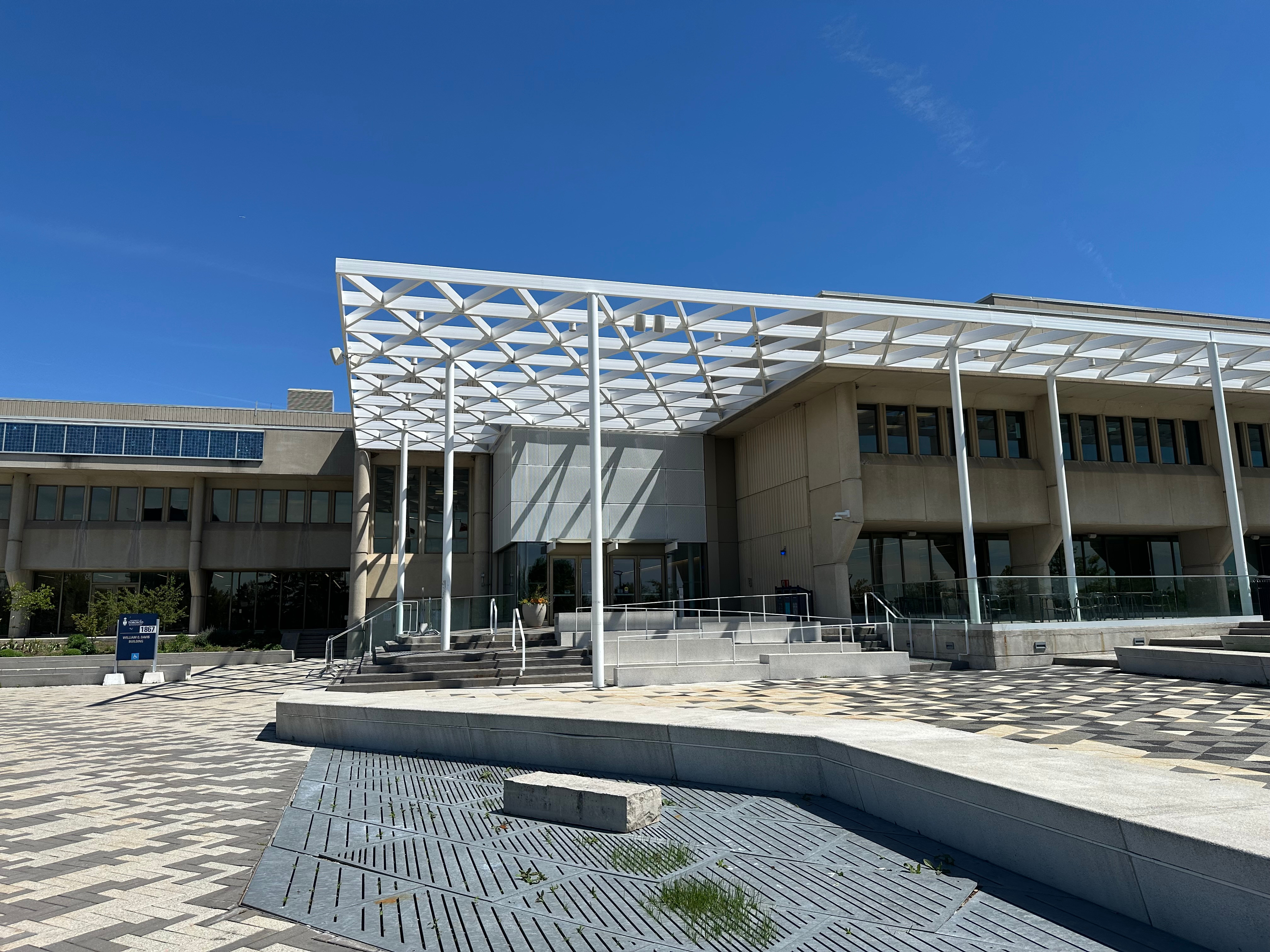
- The building's front facade in 2026
- Former names: South Building (1973–2009)

General information
- Type: Academic
- Architectural style: Brutalist
- Location: 1867 Inner Circle, Mississauga, Ontario, Canada
- Coordinates: 43°32′55″N 79°39′41″W
- Named for: William G. Davis
- Completed: 1973; 53 years ago
- Owner: University of Toronto

Design and construction
- Architect: Raymond Moriyama
- Other designers: John Andrews (original concept)

Other information
- Public transit: UTM bus terminal

The William G. Davis Building (commonly known as the Davis Building) is an academic building of the University of Toronto and the oldest and largest structure on its Mississauga campus in Mississauga, Ontario, Canada.

The building was part of the initial plans for Erindale College, designed by architect Raymond Moriyama to be a single mega-structure atop the valley of the Credit River. Completed in 1973 as the South Building, the brutalist structure remains the largest academic space on the campus.

It is the seat of the Mississauga Campus Council and houses the main administrative offices of both the campus principal and dean alongside various academic departments, student services, laboratories, lecture halls, and a food court. It was given its present name in honour of Ontario premier and education minister William G. Davis in 2010.

== History ==
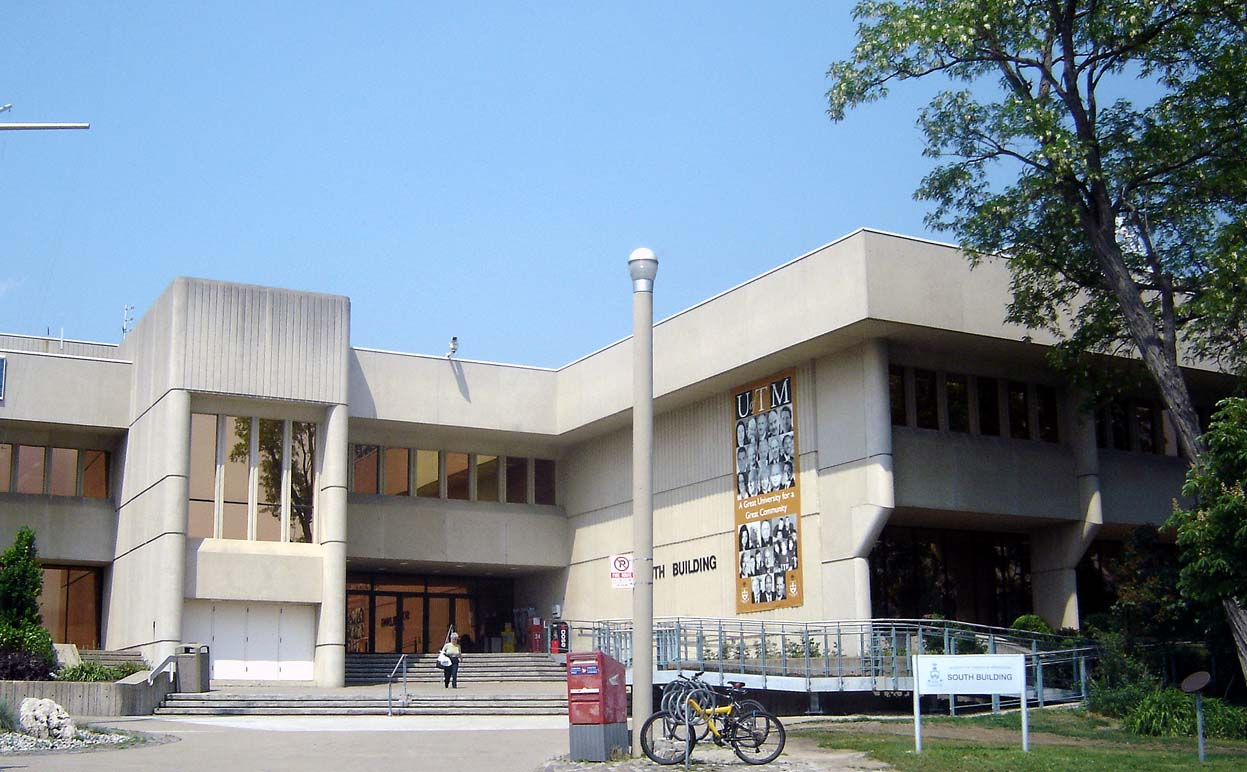
The Davis Building in 2005, then known as the South Building

In 1966, a temporary building (later known as the North Building) was created for the establishment of Erindale College in 1967. As it was only meant to be temporary, architect and U of T professor John Andrews was tasked to lead the design of a permanent building. He developed plans for a "central mega-structure" on the campus, similar to his work on the Scarborough College building years prior. For unknown reasons, architect Raymond Moriyama took over the project and created a new design, becoming one of his first major commissions. Moriyama's approved plan envisioned one central building that would hold all academic facilities, thus preserving the campus's natural state.

The first phase of its construction was completed in 1971, known as the Research Wing. The final phase, which makes up the main portion of the Davis Building today, finished in 1973 and opened that same year. It was constructed on the west bank of the Credit River, north of Wilson Pond, primarily out of exposed concrete in a style characterized as brutalist architecture.

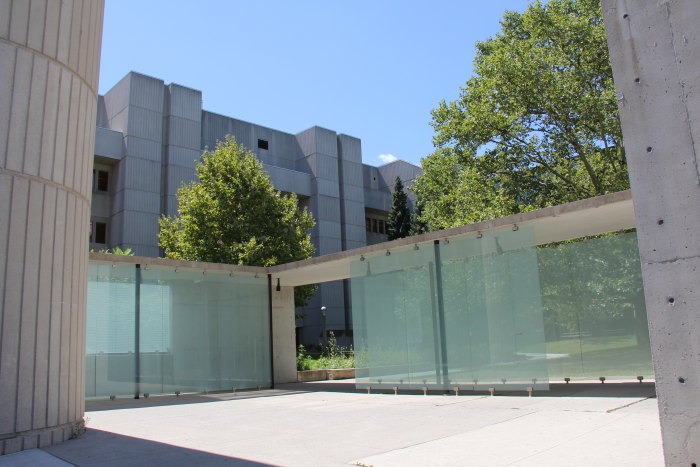
Courtyard between the Davis buildings and the Communication, Culture and Technology (CCT) Building

The building housed the majority of the campus library's collection until 2006 with the opening of the Hazel McCallion Academic Learning Centre. It has received multiple renovations and expansions, including the addition of the Recreation, Athletics and Wellness Centre (RAWC) in 2005 and the Science Building in 2024, which were built into the south and east sides of the Davis Building respectively. Renovations which filled the freed space from the relocated library were undertaken by Kearns Mancini Architects and completed in 2009. Space on the second (ground floor) and third floors were converted into extra classrooms and faculty and administrative office spaces. Both the Departments of Sociology and Geography, Campus Safety services, and offices for executive faculty were also allocated to this section.

The South Building was renamed in 2010 in honour of William G. Davis, a University of Toronto alumnus who served as Ontario minister of education from 1964–1971, and premier of Ontario from 1971–1985. Davis is credited for his influence on education in the province.

The Department of Sociology moved to Maanjiwe nendamowinan following its opening in 2018.

In 2024, a Student Services Hub was added in the building which houses various student services departments, including Accessibility Services and the Career Centre.

== Facilities ==
The Davis Building houses the UTM Departments of Biology and Geography on the third floor and Department of Chemical and Physical Sciences on the fourth. The third floor is the location of the campus administrative offices, including that of the principal and dean. Also on the floor is the Council Chamber, the main meeting space for the UTM Campus Council of the University of Toronto Governing Council.

The building's second floor is the main ground level, and contains the Meeting Place, Student Services Hub, and four lecture halls. The first floor, which is partially underground, contains Spigel Hall, the Health and Counselling Centre (HCC), offices for the Department of Recreation, Athletics and Wellness, and the Mississauga location of the University of Toronto Bookstore. An underground tunnel connecting to the Kaneff Centre/Innovation Complex from the first floor of the Davis Building was built in 2014.

=== The Meeting Place ===
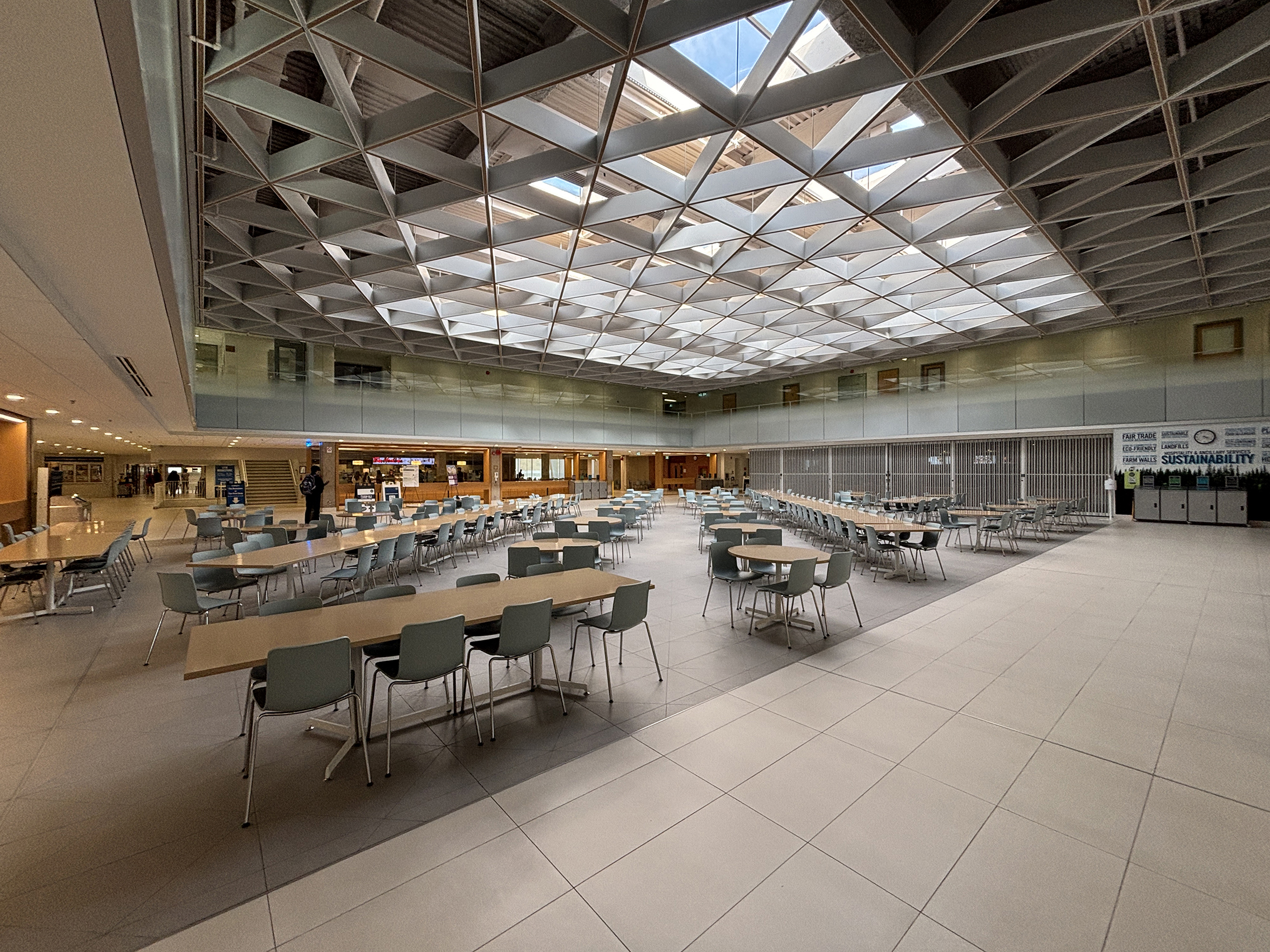
The Meeting Place, which houses the Davis Food Court

The Davis Building is home to the Meeting Place, a central seating area on the second floor encompassing the Davis Food Court and a Tim Hortons location. The UTM cafeteria was originally located in the I.M. Spigel Dining Hall on the first floor, named after I. "Mike" Spigel, a former professor of psychology, associate dean and founding member of Erindale College. The main dining area was moved to the larger Meeting Place to accommodate campus growth. The food court is mainly non-branded vendors that serve locally-sourced meals such as pasta, salads, and sandwiches. There are also locations of Thai Express and Harvey's.

=== J. Tuzo Wilson Research Wing ===
The western wing of the building completed in 1971 is known as the J. Tuzo Wilson Research Wing, and hosts numerous laboratories mainly for the natural sciences. It is named after the campus's second principal, John Tuzo Wilson. It has five storeys and bridged connections to the adjacent Terrence Donnelly Health Sciences Complex and Communication, Culture and Technology (CCT) building.

=== Student Services Hub ===
Opened in 2024, the Student Services Hub is home to various campus services including the UTM Career Centre, Accessibility Services, Centre for Student Engagement, and International Education Centre. The space is where the campus library used to be for a period before it moved to the Hazel McCallion Academic Learning Centre. Centrally located in the hub is a service desk known as the Hello Desk.

== See also ==
- Brutalist architecture
- List of Brutalist structures
- List of University of Toronto buildings
