= Blackwood Gallery =

Contemporary art museum at the University of Toronto Mississauga

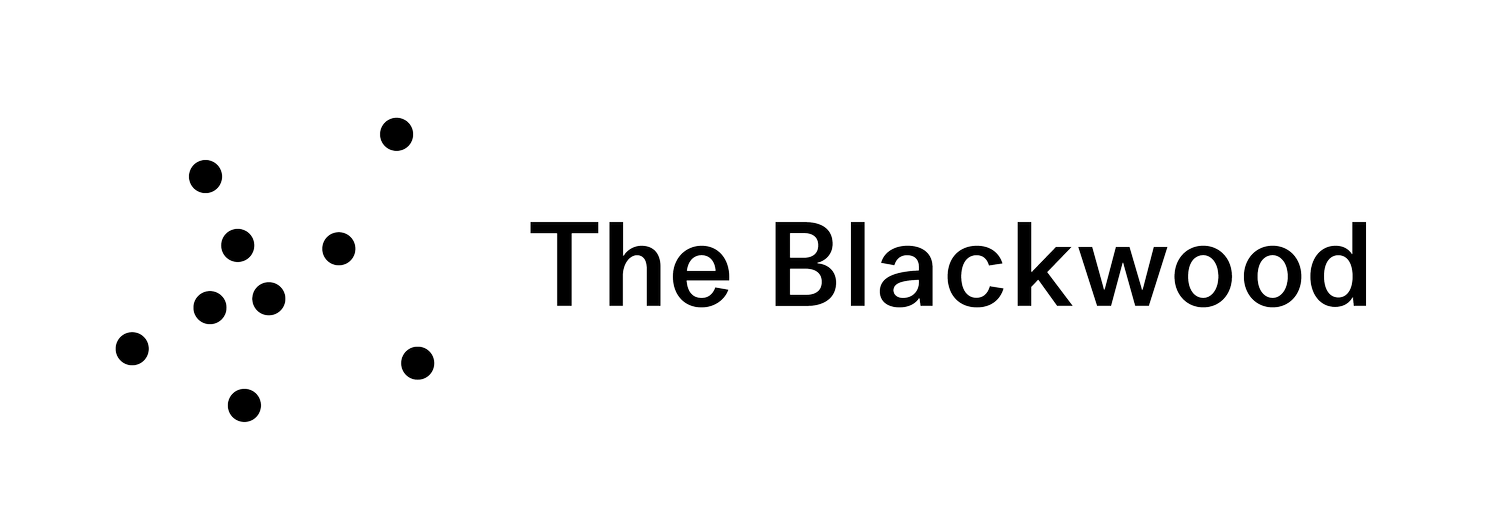
- Former name: Erindale College Art Gallery (1969–1992)
- Established: 1969; 57 years ago
- Location: 3359 Mississauga Road, Mississauga, Ontario, Canada
- Coordinates: 43°32′54″N 79°39′47″W
- Type: Contemporary art centre
- Collection size: 450+
- Director: Christine Shaw
- Website: blackwoodgallery.ca

The Blackwood Gallery (also known as The Blackwood) is an art museum and contemporary art centre at the University of Toronto, located on its campus in Mississauga, Ontario, Canada. Established in 1969, it is among the oldest public galleries in Peel Region.

The Blackwood maintains two public art galleries: its flagship space, the Blackwood Gallery, located in the Kaneff Centre and the E-Gallery (stylized as e|gallery) in the Communication, Culture and Technology (CCT) Building. It also operates four lightbox exhibits around the Mississauga campus. It is named in honour of David Blackwood, the artist-in-residence on campus from the late 1960s to early 70s.

Annual exhibitions organized by the Blackwood showcase work by students in the Art and Art History joint program between the University of Toronto Mississauga and Sheridan College's Faculty of Animation, Arts and Design.

== History ==
The Blackwood originated in 1969 as a small campus art gallery in a corridor of Erindale College's former North Building. Then known as the Erindale College Art Gallery, it was the second public art gallery to open in the County of Peel, after the Peel Museum and Art Gallery in Brampton. The gallery was renamed in 1992 to honour David Blackwood, the campus artist-in-residence from 1967 to 1971 (or 1969 to 1975 according to The Medium) after he was sought out by Erindale principal John Tuzo Wilson. Blackwood, an acclaimed graphic artist known for his depictions of Newfoundland outports and contributions to the campus, was recognized by the Order of Canada in 1993 and named honorary chairman of the Art Gallery of Ontario (AGO).

== Collection ==
The Blackwood maintains a permanent collection of over 450 works of Canadian contemporary art with a focus on pieces created by Ontario-based and Indigenous artists, including David Blackwood, Kenojuak Ashevak, Pitseolak Ashoona, Carl Beam, Rebecca Belmore, Vera Frenkel, Mary Pratt, and Lucy Qinnuayuak.

== Facilities ==
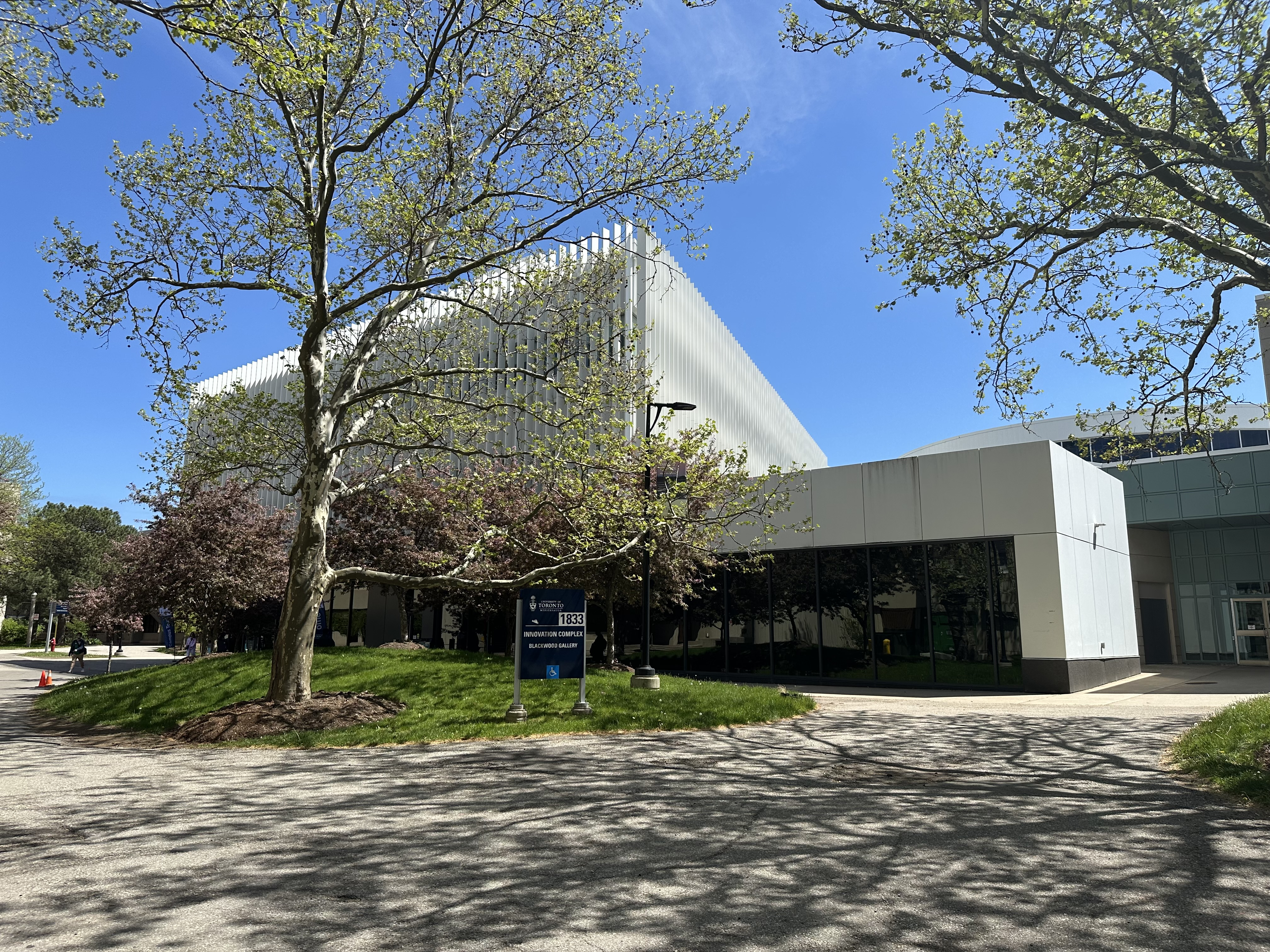
The Kaneff Centre/Innovation Complex, which houses the Blackwood Gallery

The Blackwood's main space is the Blackwood Gallery, located in room 140 of the Kaneff Centre. A project to upgrade its permanent collection storage and preservation facilities was completed in 2014 during the construction of the Innovation Complex. The E-Gallery is the Blackwood's secondary space, located on the first floor of the Communication, Culture and Technology (CCT) Building.

In addition to the two gallery spaces, the Blackwood maintains four public lightbox displays throughout the University of Toronto Mississauga campus, such as the Bernie Miller Lightbox outside of the William G. Davis Building. Three of the aforementioned displays were added in 2019.

== Leadership ==
Directors/Curators of the Blackwood

1. Barbara Fischer 1999–2005
2. Séamus Kealy 2005–2008
3. Christof Migone 2008–2013
4. Christine Shaw 2013–present

== See also ==
- Art Museum at the University of Toronto, at the St. George campus
- Galeries Ontario / Ontario Galleries
- List of contemporary art museums
- List of art museums
