= Andrews Building =

Building at the University of Toronto Scarborough

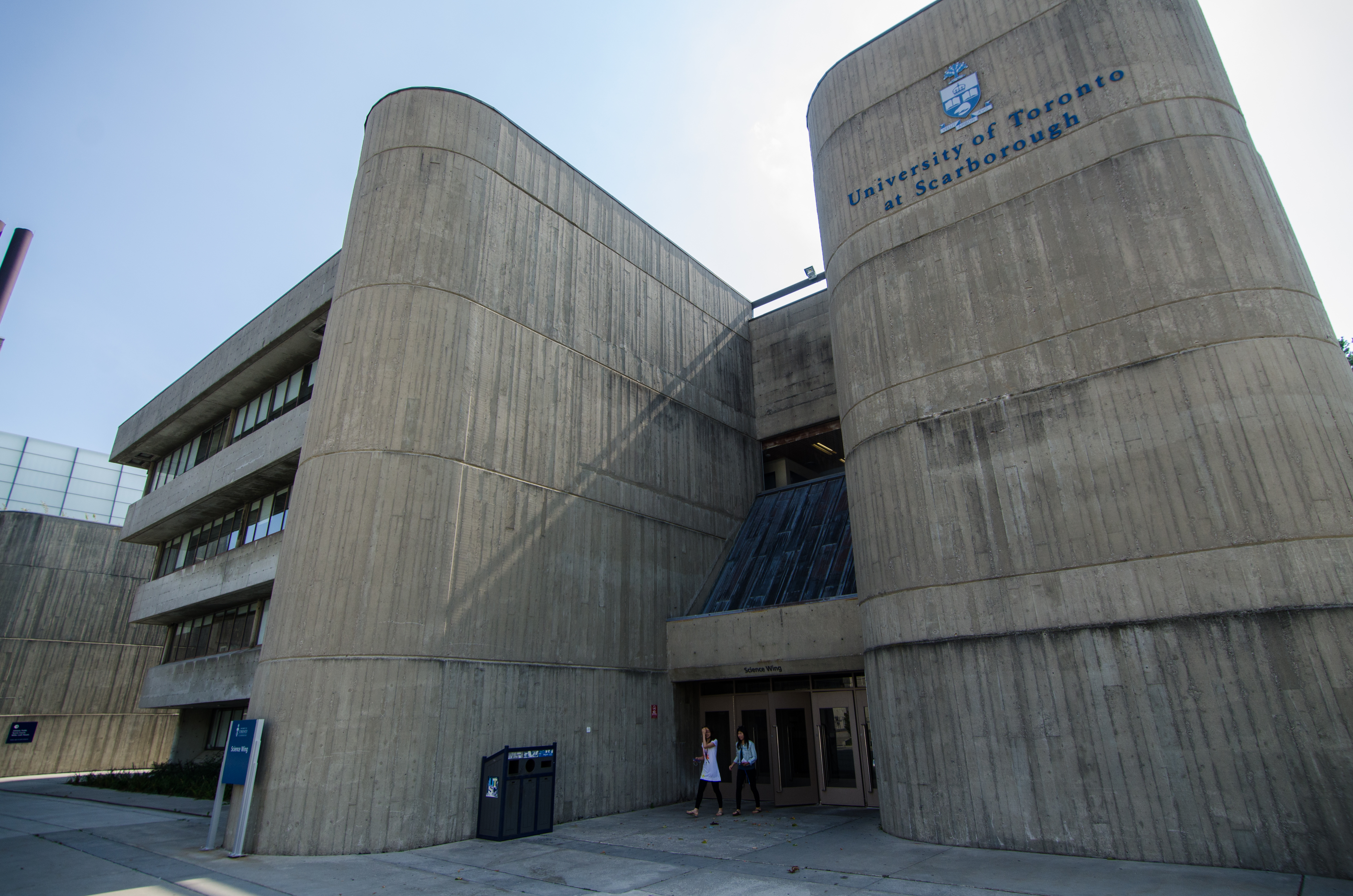
- Exterior of the Science Wing in 2015

General information
- Type: Academic
- Architectural style: Brutalist architecture
- Location: 1265 Military Trail, Toronto, Ontario, Canada
- Coordinates: 43°47′01″N 79°11′16″W
- Completed: 1964; 62 years ago
- Owner: University of Toronto

Design and construction
- Architect: John Andrews

Other information
- Public transit: UTSC bus terminal

The Science Wing (S-Wing) and Humanities Wing (H-Wing), known together as the Andrews Building, is an academic building of the University of Toronto and the oldest structure on its Scarborough campus in Toronto, Ontario, Canada.

The megalithic brutalist structure was built in 1964, near Highland Creek in the former city of Scarborough. The Andrews Building is noted for its unique architecture, described as futuristic and forward-thinking for its time. It was one of the first major commissions of architect and professor John Andrews at the age of 29, who later went on to help design the CN Tower. Its expansive exposed concrete structure, stepped design and prominent chimneys have made it the subject of international attention and acclaim since its opening.

The building was featured on the cover of Time in 1967 and has appeared in several films and television series, including The Shape of Water (2017), and the music videos for "Secrets" by The Weeknd and "National Treasures" by Drake.

== History ==
The building's history is tied closely to that of the Scarborough campus. Known as Scarborough College during its inception in 1946, the constituent college of the University of Toronto held its first class in the old Biology Building on the St. George campus. This temporary accommodation was made as the first proper campus building was under construction at the new site in Scarborough. The University of Toronto commissioned the building to be designed by Australian architect and part-time professor John Andrews, who was 29 at the time. Unofficially named after the architect, the Andrews Building was completed in 1964 and held Scarborough College's first class at its permanent campus in 1965. At the time of its construction, it was one of the largest predominantly concrete buildings in the world.

Scarborough College was the first major expansion of the University of Toronto to be at a distance from its St. George campus in downtown Toronto, and was shortly followed by Erindale College in 1967. The building was designed with the intention of conducting distance learning through an extensive television system. Lectures were to be recorded at St. George and played for students at Scarborough College to eliminate the need for travel between the two campuses. The "Nerve Centre" was the Andrews Building's television production studio, encompassing a large 60 by 50–foot space and five adjacent smaller studios. The network could handle 11 instructional programs at a time, covering 50 classrooms.

The building was featured on the cover of Time magazine in its January 13, 1967 issue.

== Architecture ==
The large building's unconventional layout was designed by John Andrews to act as "indoor streets," to reduce the need for outdoor travel and shield students from the cold during winter months. Its two wings, the Humanities and Science wings, are connected by a central atrium known as the Meeting Place, set below a large concrete coffered skylight. The building's exterior features a prominent stepped concrete pinnacle rising from the main structure's sloped walls, topped by three large chimneys.

The Andrews Building's use of minimalist structures that showcase the raw materials used in its construction has warranted its classification as brutalist architecture, similar to the William G. Davis Building on the Mississauga campus. John Andrews disliked the term "brutalist" due to its negative connotation; he is quoted as saying “I object quite strongly to the word ‘brutalist’, continuing that “It isn’t brutal. Scarborough College is a very human building.”

=== Gallery ===
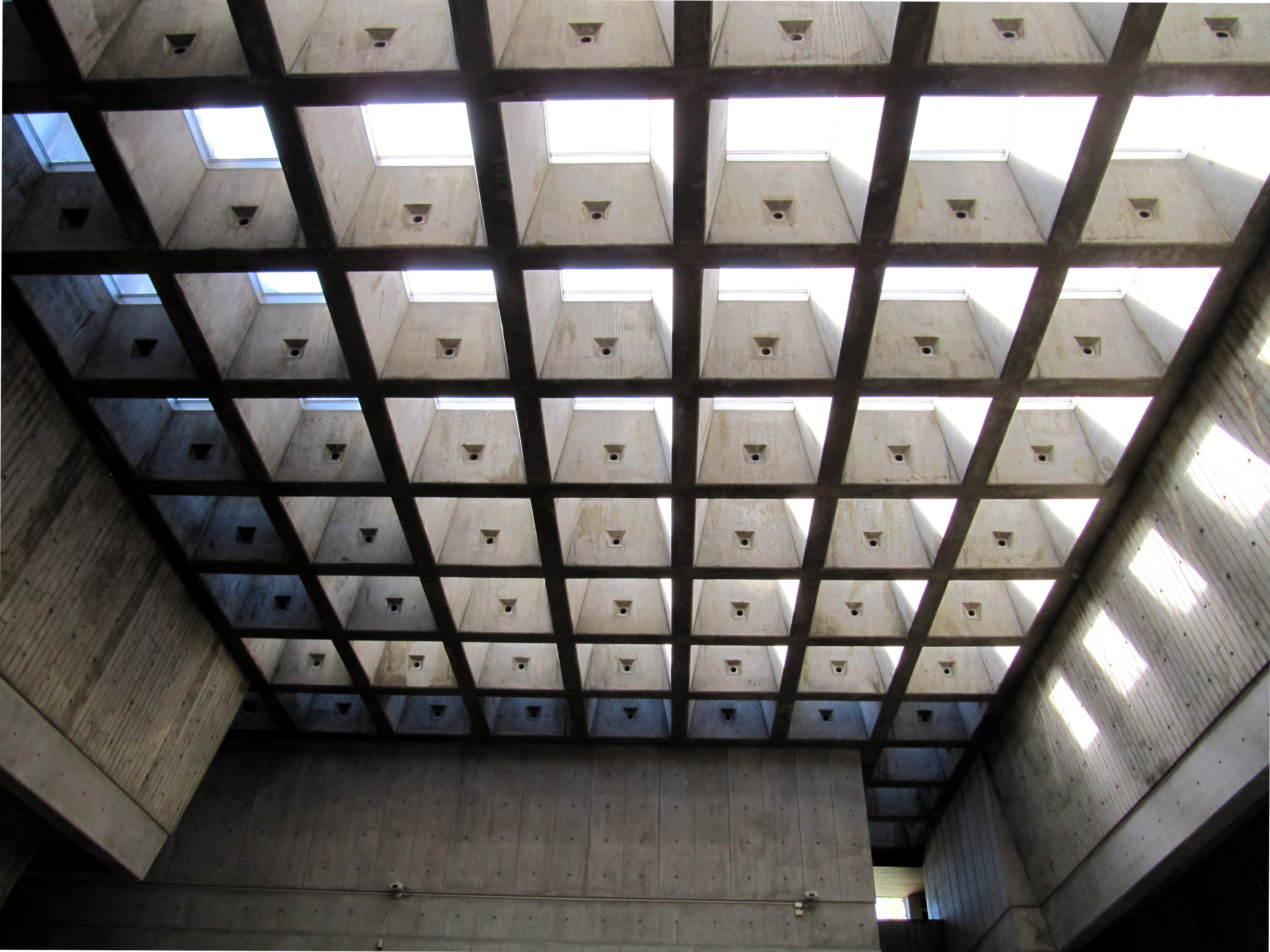
Meeting Place skylight

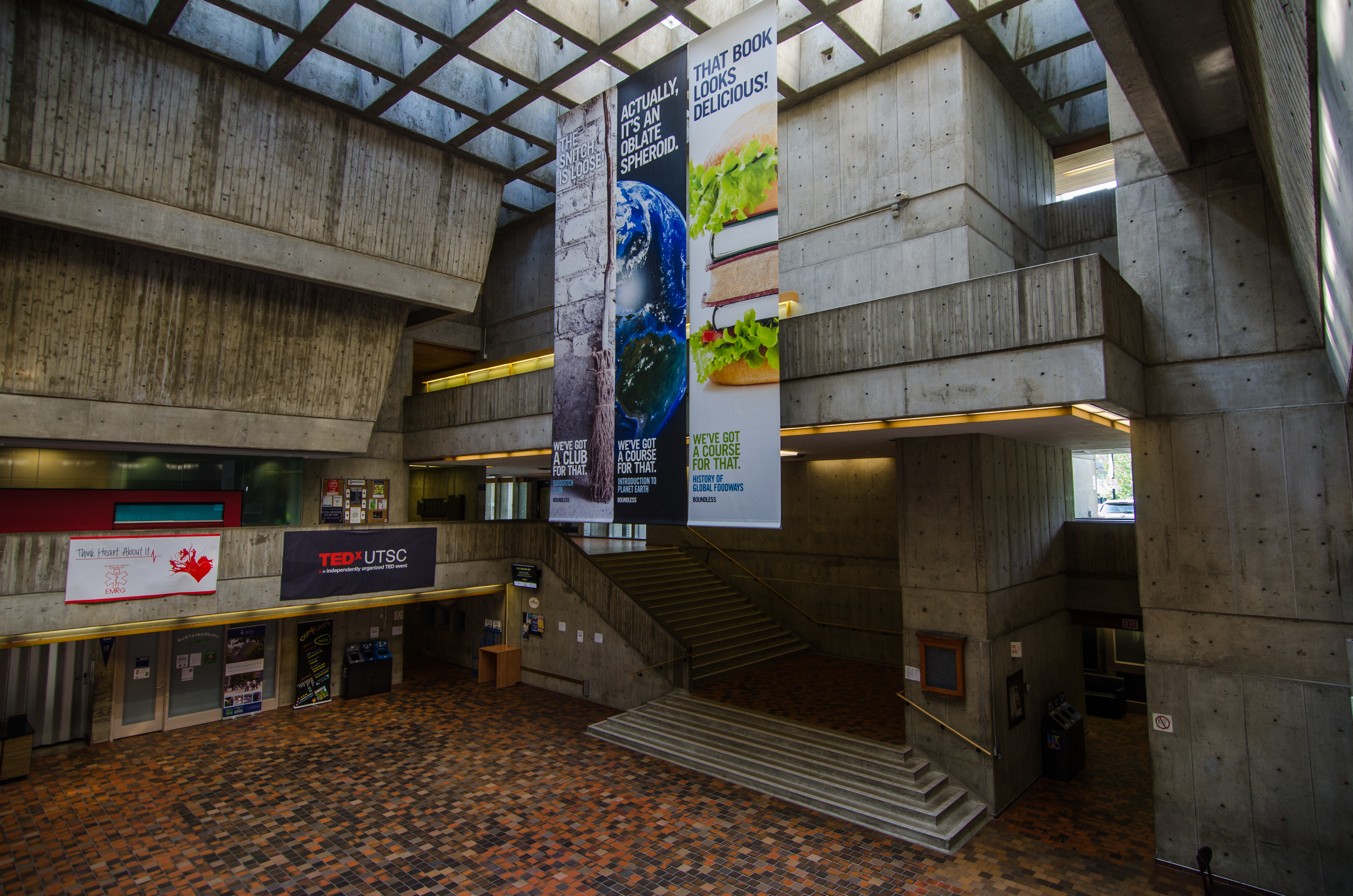
The Meeting Place

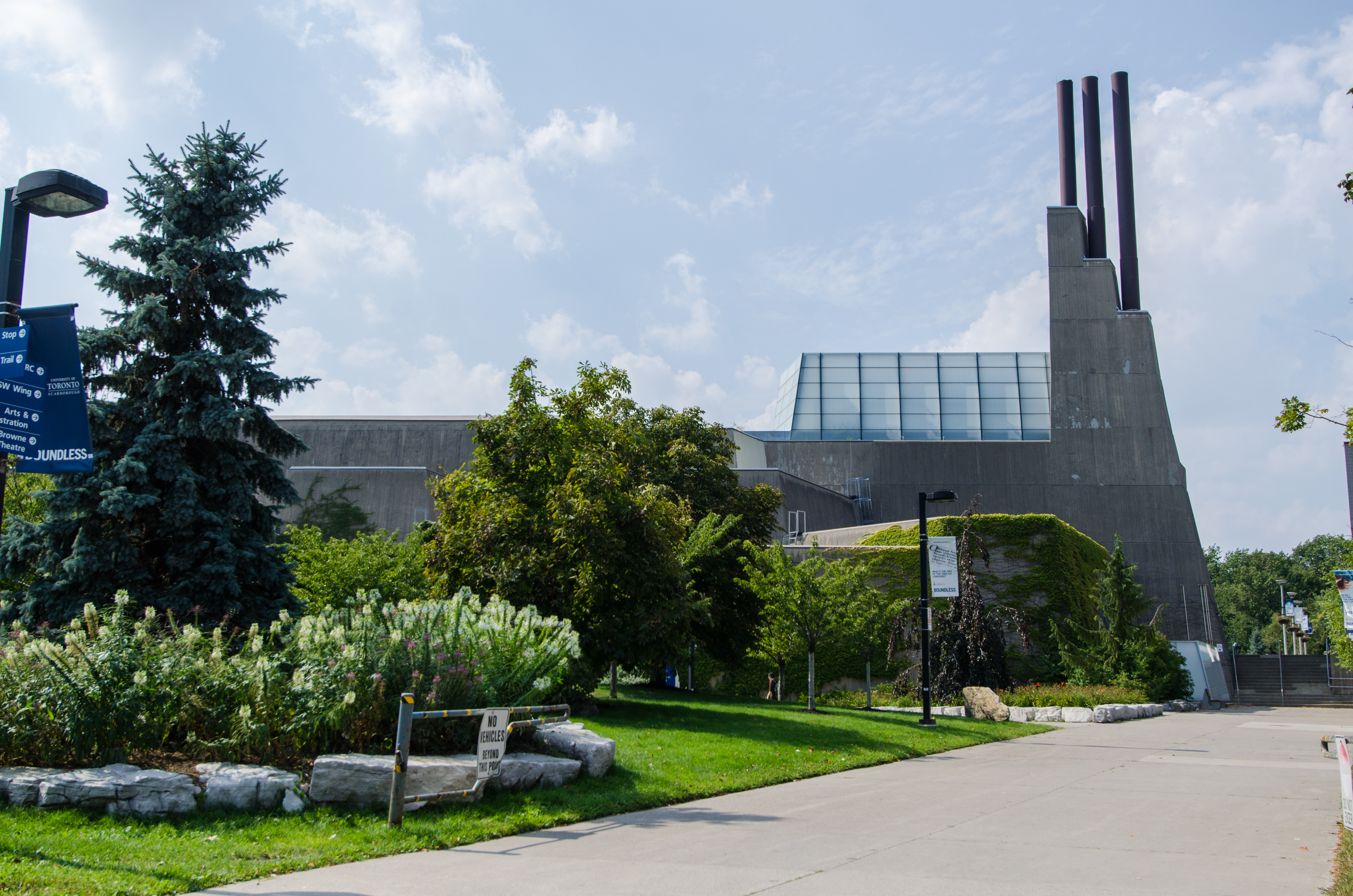
Exterior of the building

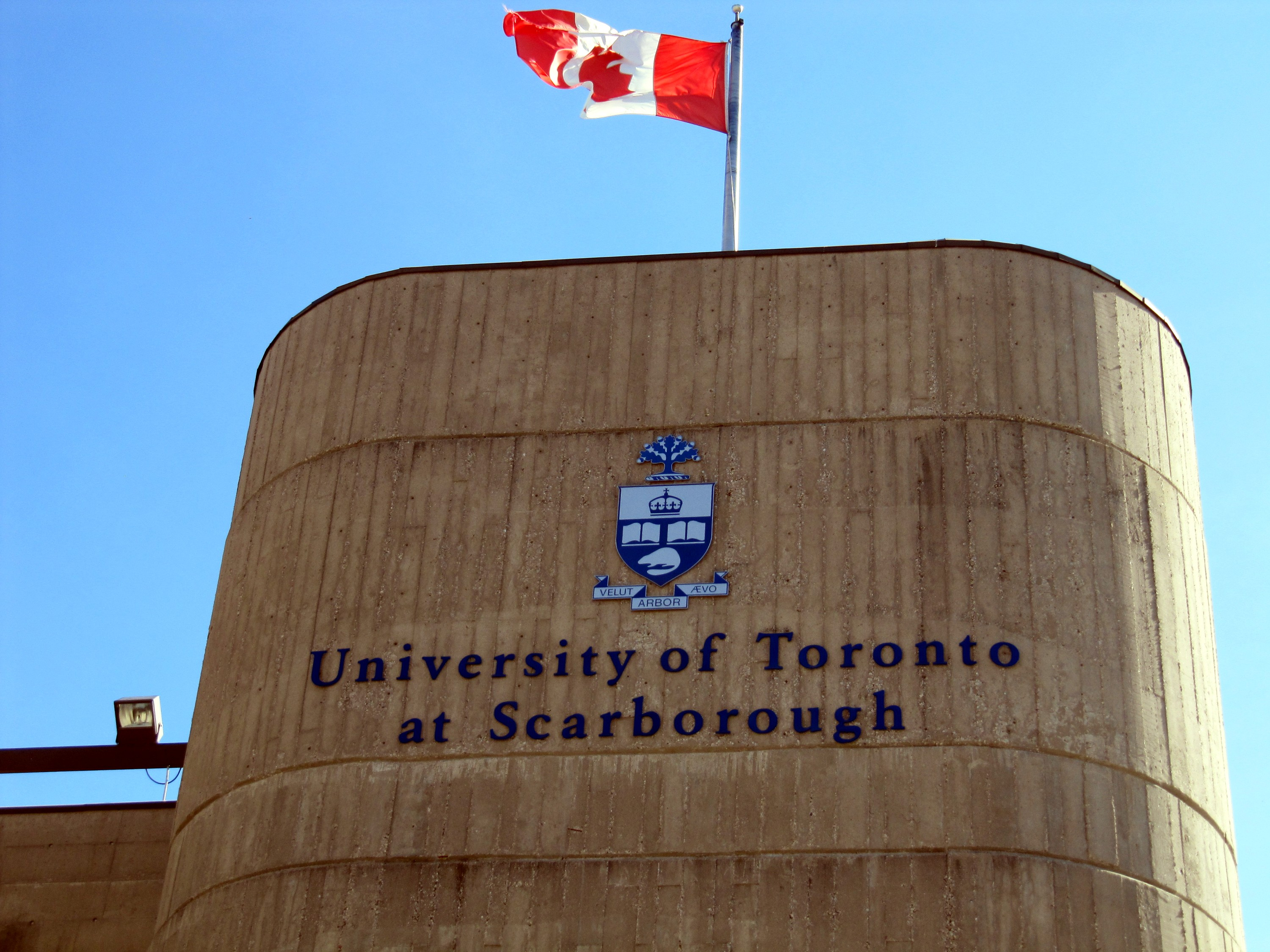
Science Wing UTSC sign

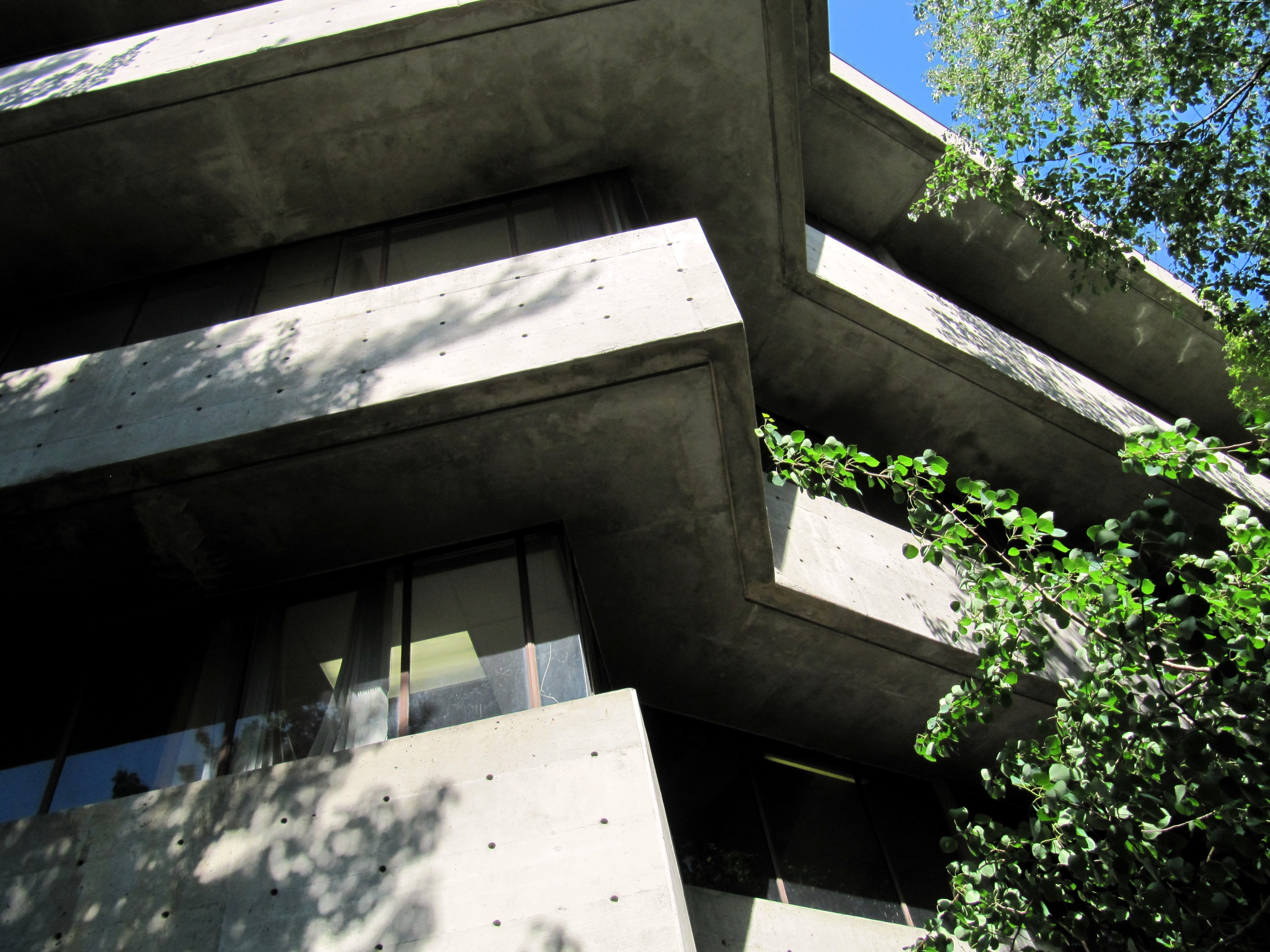
Humanities Wing exterior

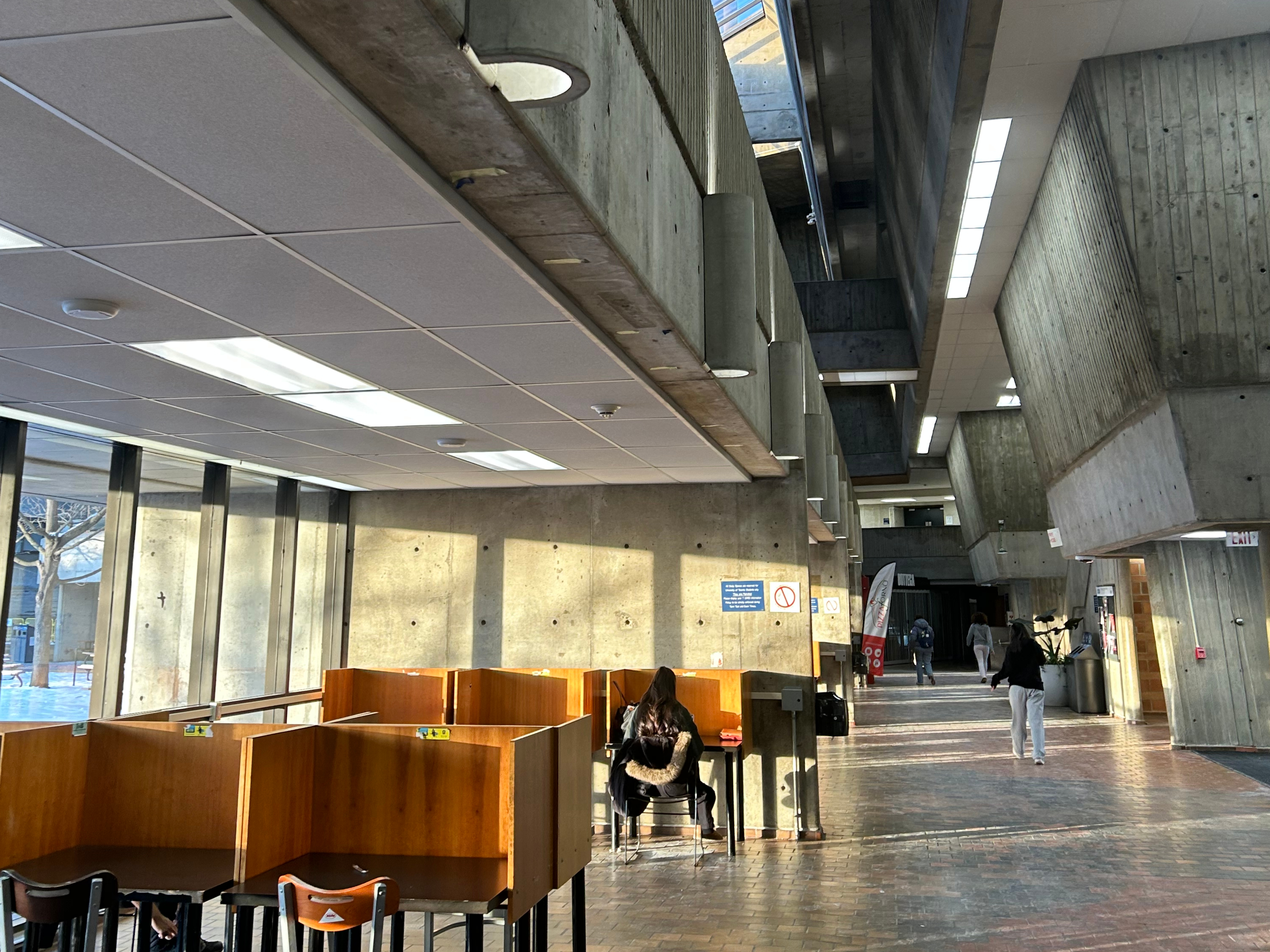
Humanities Wing interior

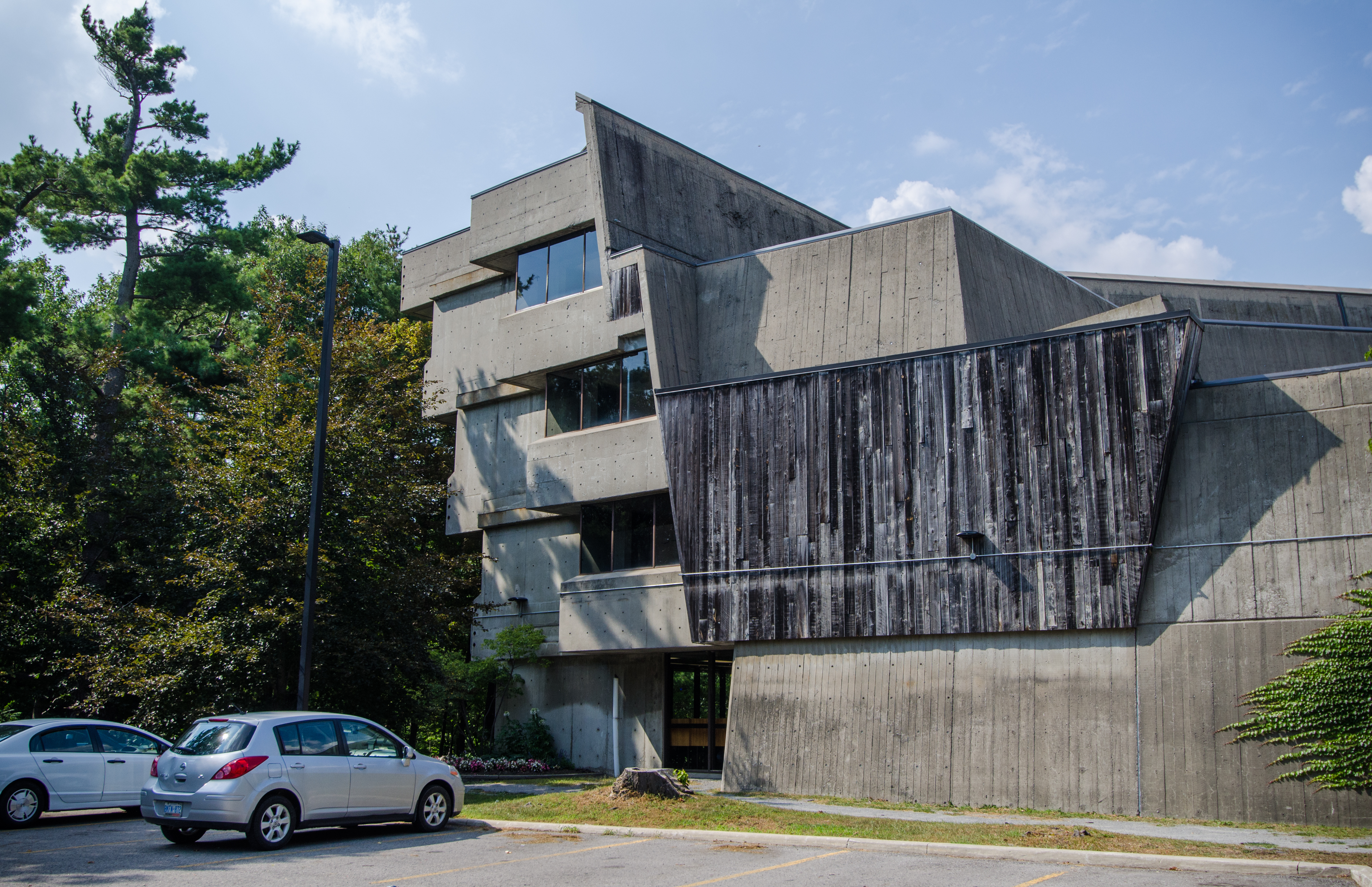
Science Wing exterior

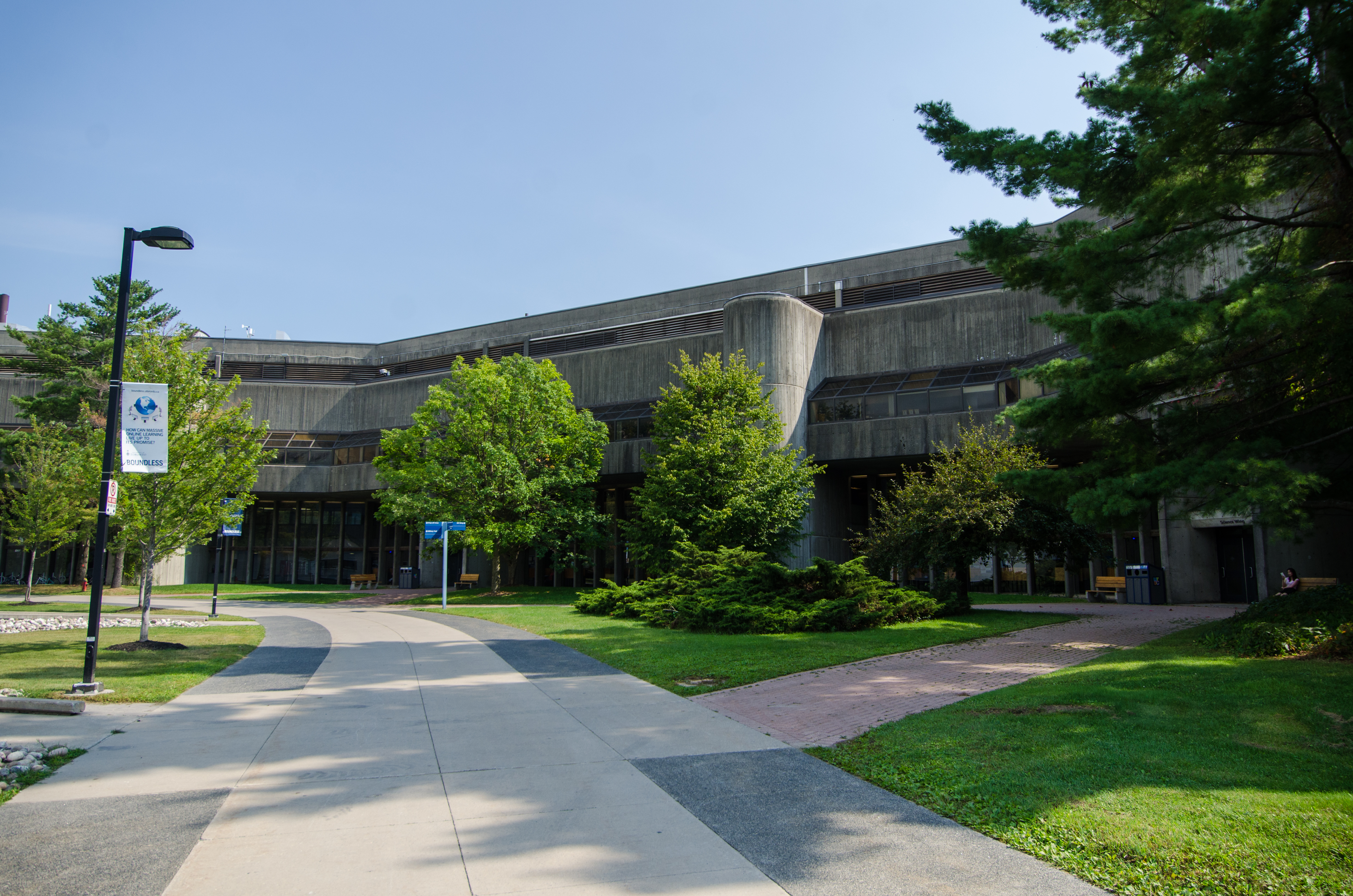
Science Wing exterior

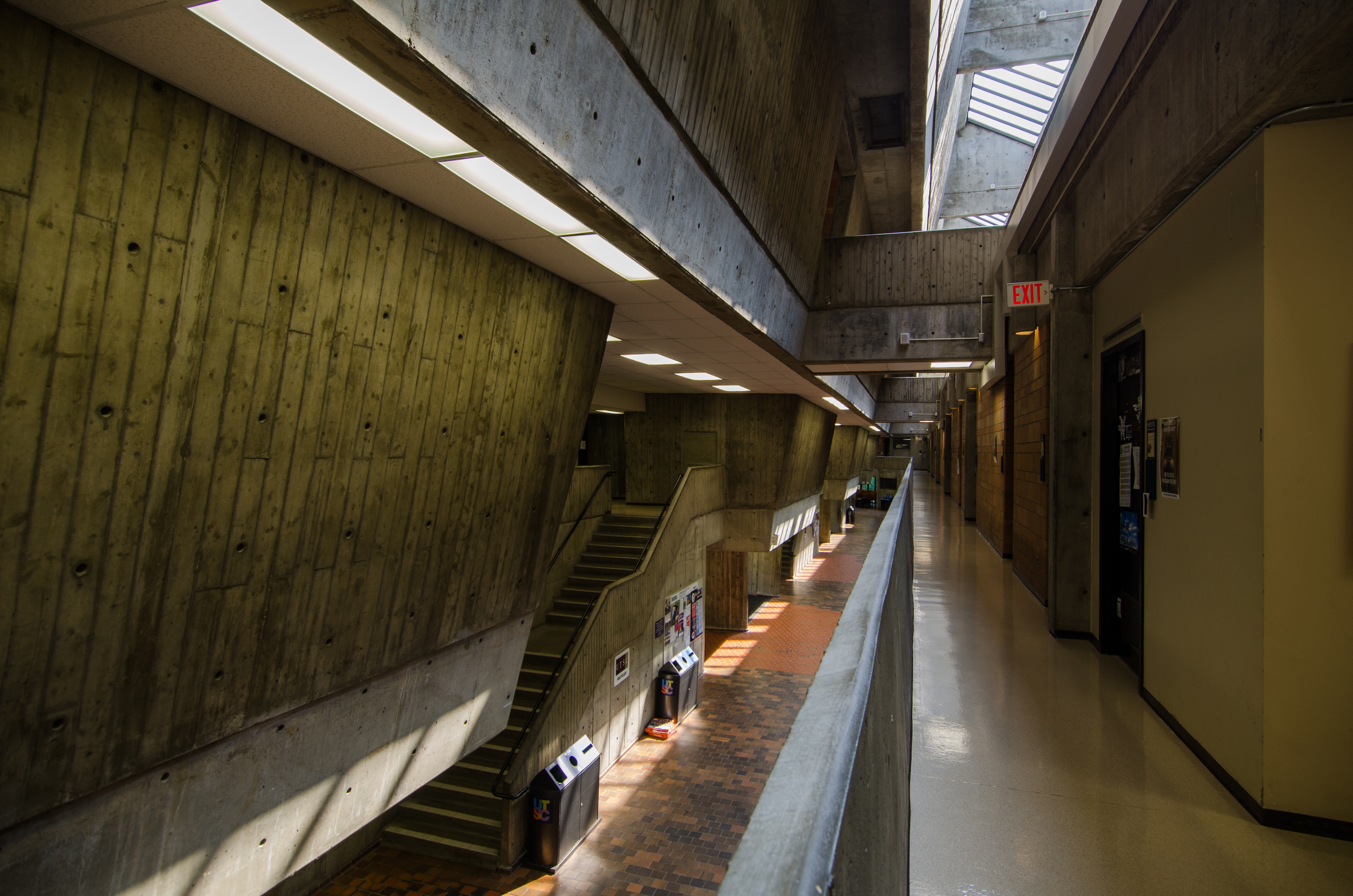
Interior hallway

== In popular culture ==
The Andrews Building has been used as a filming location for several popular movies, television series, and music videos. Three years after its opening, the building was featured in Toronto-born director David Cronenberg's directorial debut feature film, Stereo (1969). Since then, it can be seen in films including Resident Evil: Afterlife (2010), Total Recall (2012), Canadian director Denis Villeneuve's Enemy (2013), Suicide Squad (2016), director Guillermo del Toro's Pacific Rim (2013) and The Shape of Water (2017), Anon (2018), and Dream Scenario (2023).

The building has appeared in television series such as the legal drama Suits (2011–2019), Hannibal (2013–2015), The Hot Zone (2019–2021), Canadian space drama Killjoys (2015–2019), The Handmaid's Tale (2017–2025), the sci-fi series The Expanse (2015–2022) and the Netflix miniseries Guillermo del Toro's Cabinet of Curiosities (2022).

Canadian musician The Weeknd (himself raised in Scarborough) filmed the music video for his song "Secrets" in Toronto at the Andrews Building and Toronto Reference Library. The song appears on his 2016 album Starboy.

The Andrews Building appears in Drake's music video for "National Treasures" released in 2026.

== See also ==
- Partial list of works by John Andrews
- Brutalist architecture
- List of University of Toronto buildings
