= University of Toronto Mississauga Library =

Academic library of the University of Toronto

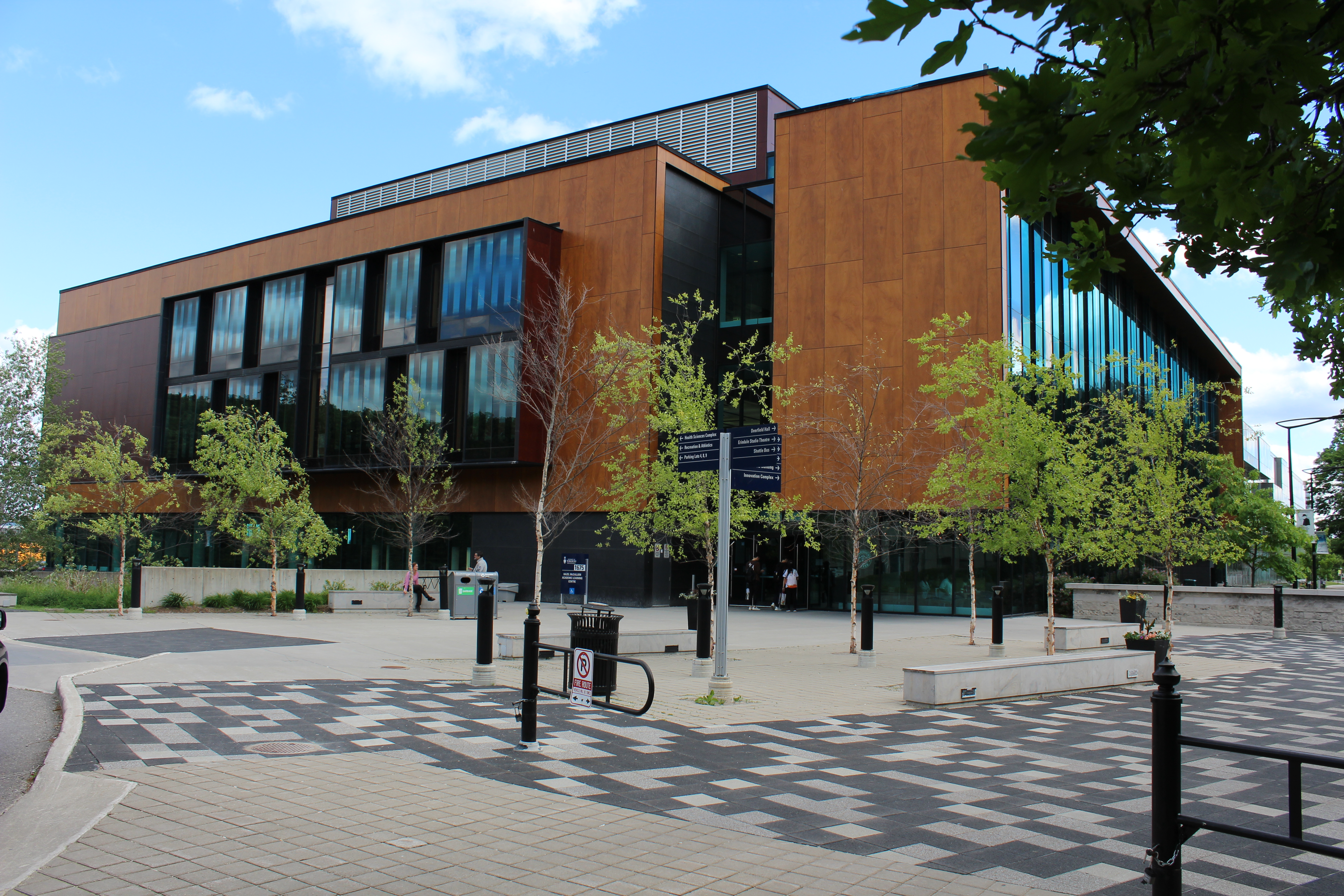
- Exterior of the Hazel McCallion Academic Learning Centre, which houses the library
- 43°33′03″N 79°39′46″W
- Location: Hazel McCallion Academic Learning Centre; 1675 Outer Circle; Mississauga, Ontario, Canada
- Type: Academic library
- Established: 1967 (59 years ago)
- Branch of: University of Toronto Libraries

Collection
- Size: 400,000

Other information
- Chief librarian: Paula Hannaford (interim)
- Public transit access: UTM bus terminal
- Website: Official website

The University of Toronto Mississauga Library (U of T Mississauga Library or UTML) is a branch of the University of Toronto Libraries system, located on the university's Mississauga campus in Mississauga, Ontario, Canada.

Originally located in the North Building then moved to the William G. Davis Building, the library is now housed in the Hazel McCallion Academic Learning Centre, built in 2006. It is the only library on campus and contains a collection of over 400,000 volumes in a broad range of subjects.

== History ==
The original Erindale College Library began when the University of Toronto’s Erindale College was created in 1967. Initially, it was a small, mainly undergraduate library located in the campus’ North Building. In 1972, it moved to a 44,000-square-foot (4,100 m^{2}) facility in the South Building (renamed the William G. Davis Building in 2009–10), becoming a full-service campus library. Early in 2000, it was renamed from the Erindale College Library to the University of Toronto Mississauga Library.

In 2004, construction began on a new 110,000-square-foot (10,200 m^{2}), $34-million library building project — the Hazel McCallion Academic Learning Centre, named after former City of Mississauga mayor Hazel McCallion. The new facility increased study space by 85 per cent, and better accommodated the campus’ growing student population than its predecessor, which was built for a student population half the size. The Hazel McCallion Academic Learning Centre opened for student use in October 2006.

== Collections ==
The library has a collection of print, electronic and networked resources in a wired and wireless environment. Its permanent collection comprises more than 400,000 volumes.

Since October 2020, the library has housed the Syd Bolton Collection, the largest known collection of video games and related materials in Canada and one of the largest in the world.

== Hazel McCallion Academic Learning Centre ==
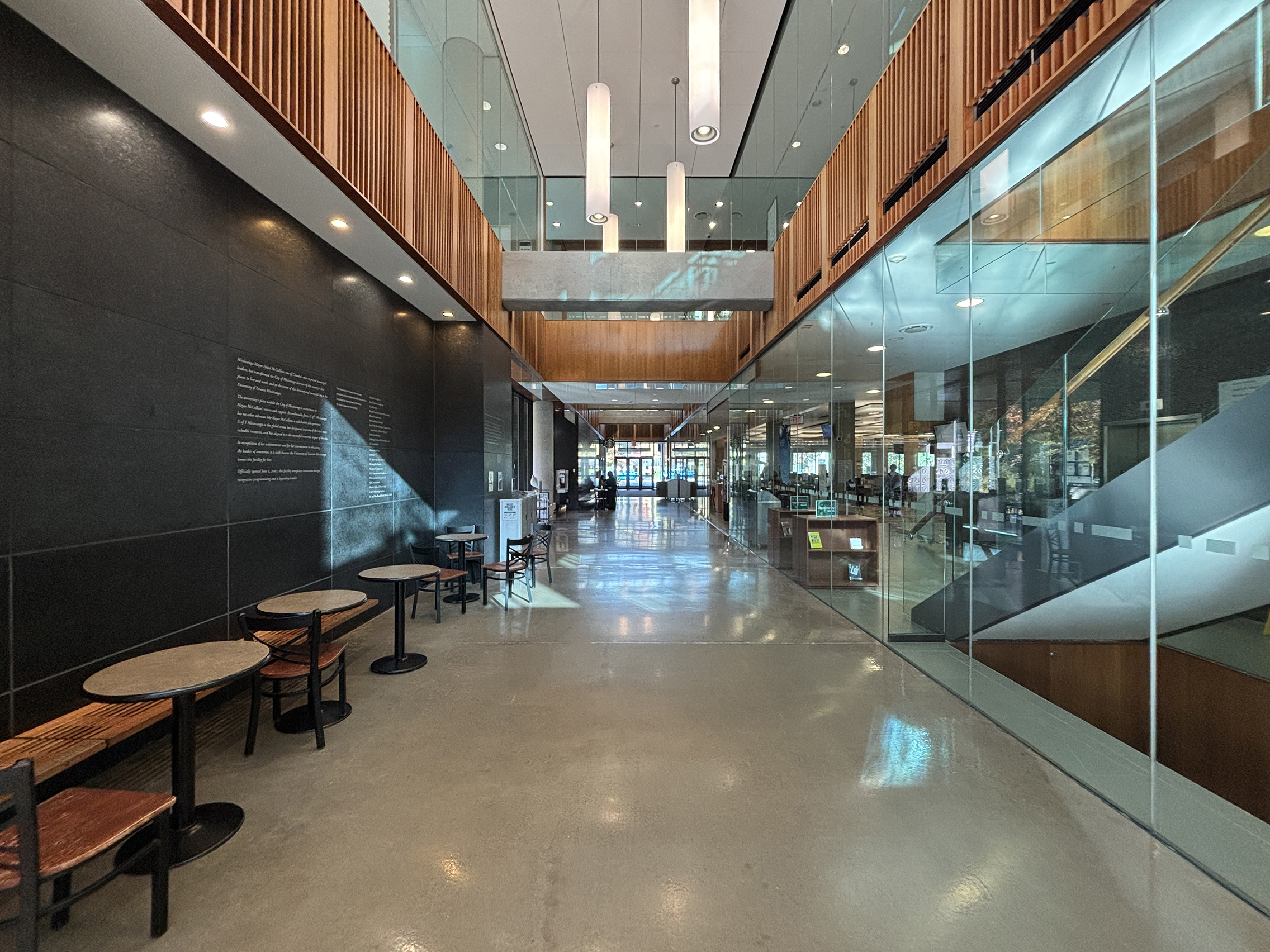
Interior of the Hazel McCallion Academic Learning Centre

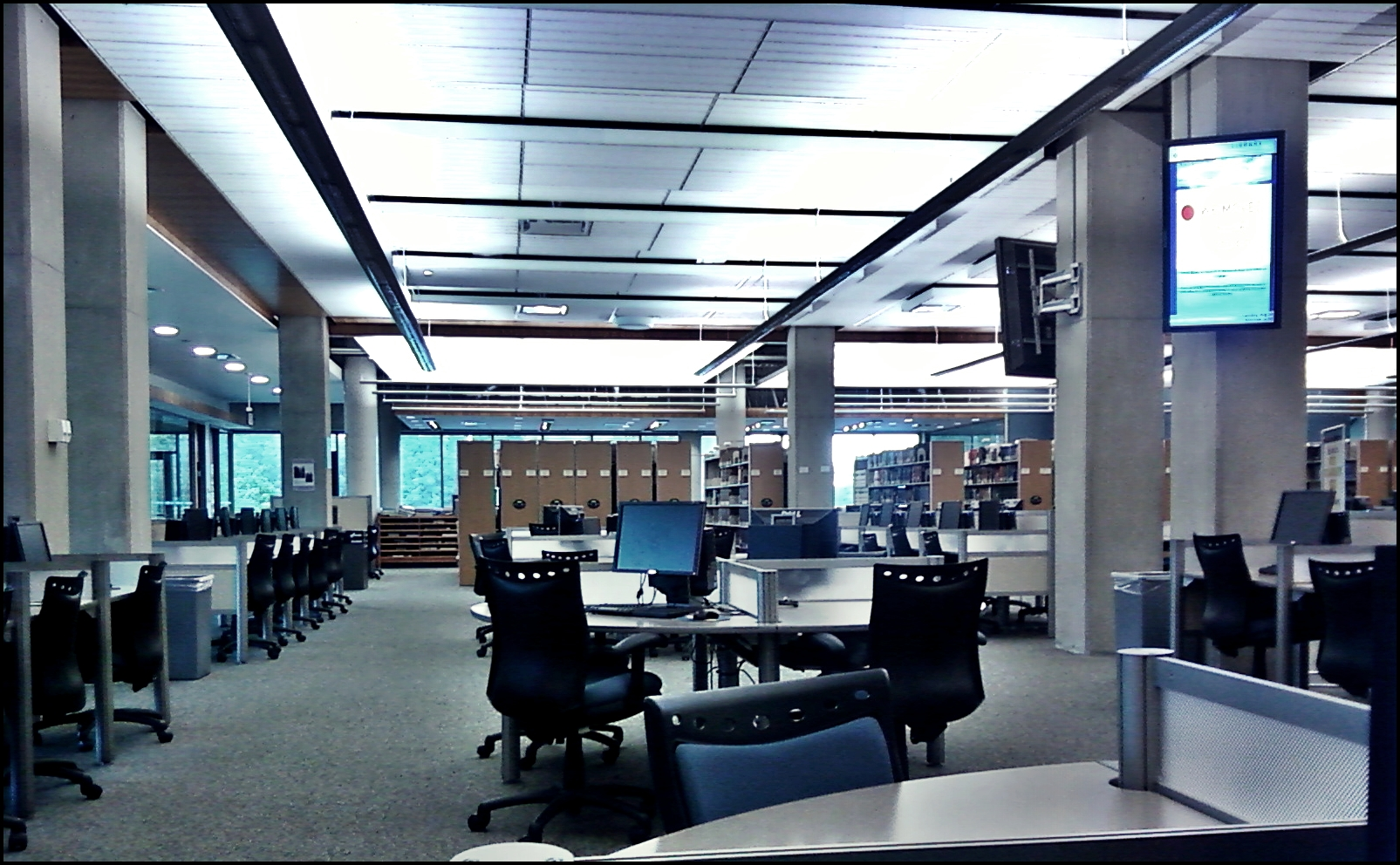
First floor of the library

Designed by Shore Tilbe Irwin & Partners (now Perkins + Will Toronto), the library facility was designed to be a "new breed" of libraries referred to as Academic Learning Centres, focused more on learning or "people" space over space for collections, and interested in engaging users in its teaching and learning mission. The design was inspired by the metaphor of a Japanese puzzle box.

The Hazel McCallion Academic Learning Centre features high density mobile shelving that houses the library’s permanent collection, as well as generous perimeter space for quiet study and collaborative learning, all with views of the surrounding campus and natural landscape. The building was the first at the University of Toronto to receive a silver LEEDs rating (Leadership in Energy and Environmental Design).

The library is divided into Learning Zones: Quiet Conversation Zones, Silent Study Zones, as well as Conversation and Cell Phone-Friendly Zones in busier areas. Zones are marked with signs as well as glass installations, acoustic panels and appropriate furniture.

The building also has a Starbucks on the first floor with outdoor patio seating.

=== Specialized learning spaces ===
The Hazel McCallion Academic Learning Centre features specialized learning spaces, including:

- Adaptive Technology Centre – A space with specialized assistive software, equipment and services.
- Amgen Canada Inc. Smart Classrooms – Teaching spaces where students learn, research, information, technological and spatial literacy skills. This space also functions as an extension of the Learning Commons, providing access to electronic resources and application software.
- AstraZeneca Canada Centre for Information and Technological Literacy – A space that provides support in the areas of instructional technology, geographic information systems, video, statistical software and data.
- Avie Bennett Community Novelties Reading Area – A space for leisure reading.
- Li Koon Chun Finance Learning Centre – Contains 32 dual-screen workstations, Bloomberg Terminals, Reuters 3000 Xtra and other research and analysis tools, as well as a stock market ticker board displaying live data feeds from the global financial community.
- RBC Learning Commons – Public computing area with desktop computers (PCs and MACs) and Netbooks and laptops for loan, a Print and Copy Centre, Information and Loans services, Research and Reference support and a Reserves section. A team of student assistants provide technical, service and referral support in the RBC Learning Commons.
- Outer Circle Recording Studio

== See also ==
- University of Toronto Libraries
- List of University of Toronto buildings
