= Yue Li =

Canadian professor of accounting

- Citizenship: Canadian
- Education: Huazhong University of Science & Technology; University of Toronto; Queen's University
- Known for: Research in Accounting Information and Financial Markets, Environmental Accounting, Hedge Accounting, Game Theory in Accounting Research and IPO Valuation
- Scientific career
- Fields: Accounting/Finance
- Workplaces: University of Toronto

Yue Li is an associate professor of accounting at the Institute for Management and Innovation and Rotman School of Management of the University of Toronto. His research interests include IPO Valuation, Accounting Information and Financial Markets, Environmental Accounting, Hedge Accounting, and Game Theory in Accounting Research.

== Education ==
Li received his Ph.D. in the fields of accounting/finance from Queen's University in Kingston, Canada in 1995. He obtained an MBA from the University of Toronto in accounting/finance in 1988 and a B.Sc. degree in applied chemistry from Huazhong University of Science & Technology in Wuhan, P. R. China in 1982.

== Research ==
Yue Li's research examines how accounting information and corporate disclosures affect market valuation of the firm. His particular area of expertise is in corporate disclosure of environmental information. Li serves on the editorial board of Advances in Environmental Accounting and Management. He has been published in the leading accounting research journals, including The Accounting Review, Contemporary Accounting Research, Journal of Accounting, Auditing & Finance, among others. His research has been presented in international conferences such as American Accounting Association Conference, Canadian Academic Accounting Association Conference, Financial Management Association Conference, Contemporary Accounting Research Conference, and Journal of Accounting, Auditing and Finance Conference.
