= Institute for Management and Innovation =

Academic unit of the University of Toronto

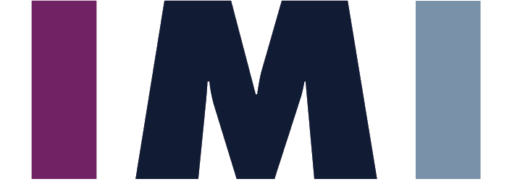
- Established: 2013; 13 years ago
- Parent institution: University of Toronto Mississauga
- Accreditation: AACSB
- Director: Shauna Brail
- Faculty: 45
- Location: Mississauga, Ontario, Canada; 43°32′54″N 79°39′46″W
- Website: utm.utoronto.ca/imi

The Institute for Management and Innovation (IMI) is a research institute and academic unit of the University of Toronto Mississauga. Established in 2013, it is housed in the Innovation Complex and primarily administers professional graduate programs on the Mississauga campus.

IMI is a graduate unit of the University of Toronto, with programs administered by the university's tri-campus School of Graduate Studies.

== History ==
The first cohort of postgraduate students to graduate from the Mississauga campus was in 1998, consisting of 43 students in the Master of Management and Professional Accounting (MMPA) program. The program is now operated by IMI.

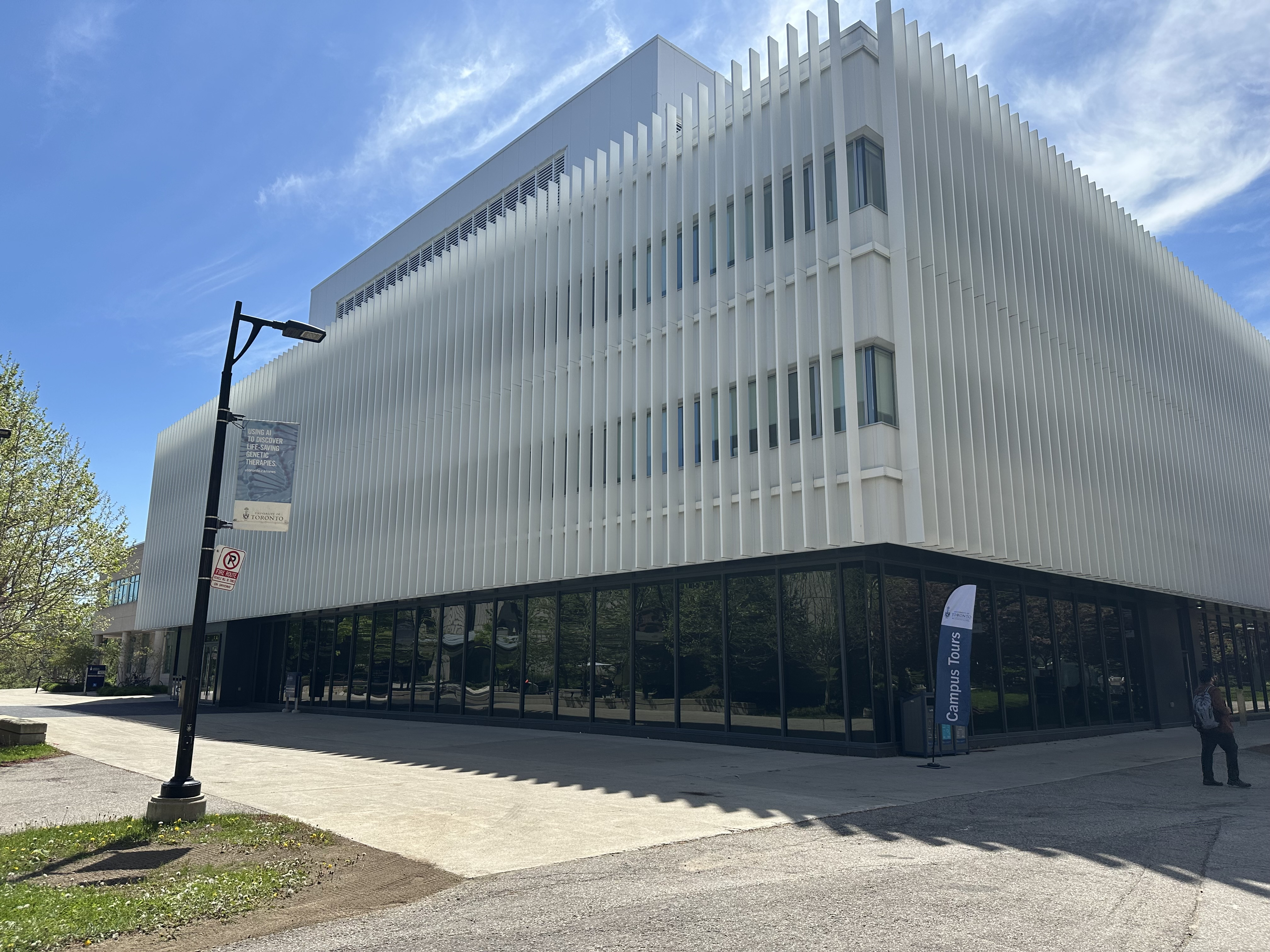
IMI is based in the Innovation Complex on the Mississauga campus

The Institute for Management and Innovation was founded in 2013 as a centre to consolidate professional degree programs on the Mississauga campus. Its establishment coincided with the opening of the four-storey Innovation Complex, a $29.7-million (CAD) expansion of the Kaneff Centre overseen by principal Deep Saini.

IMI participated in the inaugural Canada Climate Week Xchange (CCWX) in 2025.

== Initiatives and academics ==
IMI hosts several multidisciplinary master's programs through the School of Graduate Studies. Programs offered include a Master of Biotechnology (MBiotech), Master of Forensic Accounting (MFAcc), Master of Management of Innovation (MMI), Master of Management and Professional Accounting (MMPA), Master of Science in Sustainability Management (MScSM), and Master of Urban Innovation (MUI).

IMI's only undergraduate degree program is a minor in business, science and entrepreneurship. The institute also hosts the Master of Science in Biomedical Communications (MScBMC) degree, unique in Canada, in partnership with the Temerty Faculty of Medicine's Institute of Medical Science. The two-year program based in the Terrence Donnelly Health Sciences Complex on the Mississauga campus and is one of only four of its kind in the world.

All academic units for management education at the University of Toronto, including IMI, are accredited by the Association to Advance Collegiate Schools of Business (AACSB).

Notable faculty of the institute include accounting professor Yue Li.

=== ICUBE ===
The Institute for Management and Innovation hosts ICUBE UTM, a startup incubator that is part of the University of Toronto Entrepreneurship network. ICUBE sponsors pitch competitions with the City of Mississauga and awards funding for University of Toronto Mississauga students, which have supported notable businesses including the food sustainability company Just Vertical and fundraising platform Micharity.

=== Rankings ===
Although not exclusively attributed to the Institute for Management and Innovation, the University of Toronto ranked first in Canada and 33rd in the world for business and management studies by QS World University Rankings by Subject 2025. The university similarly ranked first in Canada and 24th in the world for business, economics, and management by Times Higher Education's World University Rankings by Subject 2025.

== See also ==
- Rotman School of Management
- List of academic units of the University of Toronto
