= Maanjiwe nendamowinan =

Building at the University of Toronto Mississauga

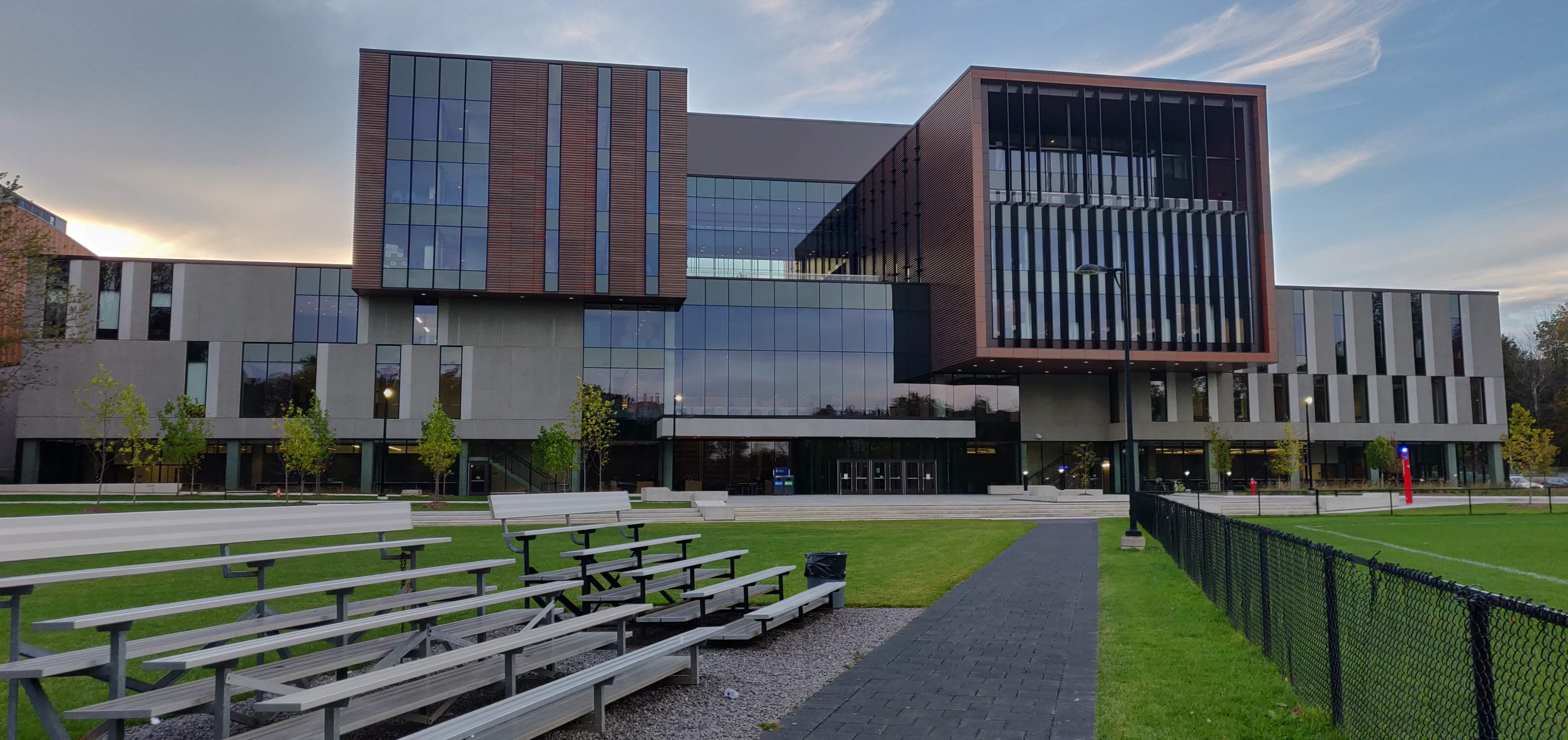
- The building in 2019
- Etymology: "Gathering of minds" in Anishinaabemowin

General information
- Type: Academic
- Location: 1535 Outer Circle, Mississauga, Ontario, Canada
- Coordinates: 43°33′04″N 79°39′57″W
- Opening: September 2018
- Inaugurated: November 22, 2019
- Cost: $89 million (CAD)
- Owner: University of Toronto

Height
- Height: 31.94m

Technical details
- Floor count: 6
- Floor area: 20,500m^{2}

Design and construction
- Architecture firm: Perkins&Will Canada
- Awards: Award of Merit (City of Mississauga); Citation Award (AIA); Global Excellence Award (IIDA); LEED Silver

Other information
- Public transit: UTM bus terminal

Maanjiwe nendamowinan (MAWN-jih-WAY nen-DEM-oh-WIN-ahn), (Note: Pronounced: /ˈmɔːn.dʒɪ.ˌweɪ nɛn.ˈdɛm.ˌoʊ.ˈhwɪn.æn/) commonly referred to by its building code MN, is an academic building on the Mississauga campus of the University of Toronto in Mississauga, Ontario, Canada. The building, whose name means "gathering of minds" in Anishinaabemowin, is a large, modern structure opened in 2018 that houses the campus's social sciences and humanities departments.

The building is featured prominently as a filming location for the Amazon Prime Video series Gen V, where it serves as the fictional Godolkin University's School of Crimefighting.

== History ==
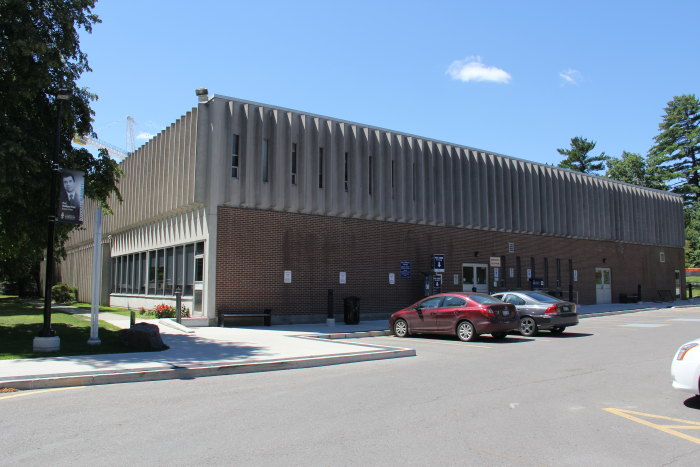
The former North Building, built in 1966 and demolished in 2015 to build Maanjiwe nendamowinan

The location of Maanjiwe nendamowinan is where the former North Building once stood, an original campus building which was intended to be temporary yet remained until 2015. The university made plans to replace it with something more modern and spacious, and the building was partially torn down for Deerfield Hall to be built in 2014 as the first phase of reconstruction. Construction continued on the second phase, dubbed the New North Building, until the building as it stands today was capped off in 2018, with an unofficial opening in September of that year.

Maanjiwe nendamowinan was officially inaugurated on November 22, 2019, in a ceremony attended by then-mayor of Mississauga Bonnie Crombie, chief R. Stacey Laforme of the Mississaugas of the Credit First Nation, and the University of Toronto administration including acting vice-president and UTM principal Ian Orchard, president Meric Gertler, and chancellor Rose Patten.

=== Naming ===
In 2019, the university began to seek suggestions on an official name for the building, which were reviewed by a "North 2 Naming Committee." On August 22, 2019, the university announced that the building would be officially named Maanjiwe nendamowinan after consulting the Mississaugas of the Credit First Nation, the Indigenous tribe whose treaty land is where the University of Toronto now exists. The name, which received unanimous approval, means "gathering of minds" in Anishinaabemowin.

== Construction ==
Maanjiwe nendamowinan cost approximately $89 million to build and consists of six storeys and 20,500 square metres (220,600 sq ft) of floor space. It was designed by American architectural firm Perkins&Will and is connected to the adjacent Deerfield Hall. The building contains a lecture hall, two active learning classrooms, lounge spaces, and offices of the Departments of English and Drama, Historical Studies, Language Studies, Philosophy, Political Science, and Sociology, as well as the Institute for the Study of University Pedagogy (ISUP) and Robert Gillespie Academic Skills Centre. The building's main atrium is known as the UTM Grand Hall. An office for the Mississaugas of the Credit First Nation (MCFN) was opened in the building in 2022.

== Awards ==
Maanjiwe nendamowinan earned a Leadership in Energy and Environmental Design (LEED) Silver certification for its sustainability features, including rainwater recycling, energy-efficient mechanical systems, a green roof, and bird-safe glass. In 2019, the International Interior Design Association (IIDA) awarded the building an IIDA Global Excellence Award in the education category, and in 2021 it won both a Citation Award from the American Institute of Architects (AIA), Canada Society chapter and an Award of Merit from the City of Mississauga Urban Design Awards.

== Shuttle bus stop ==
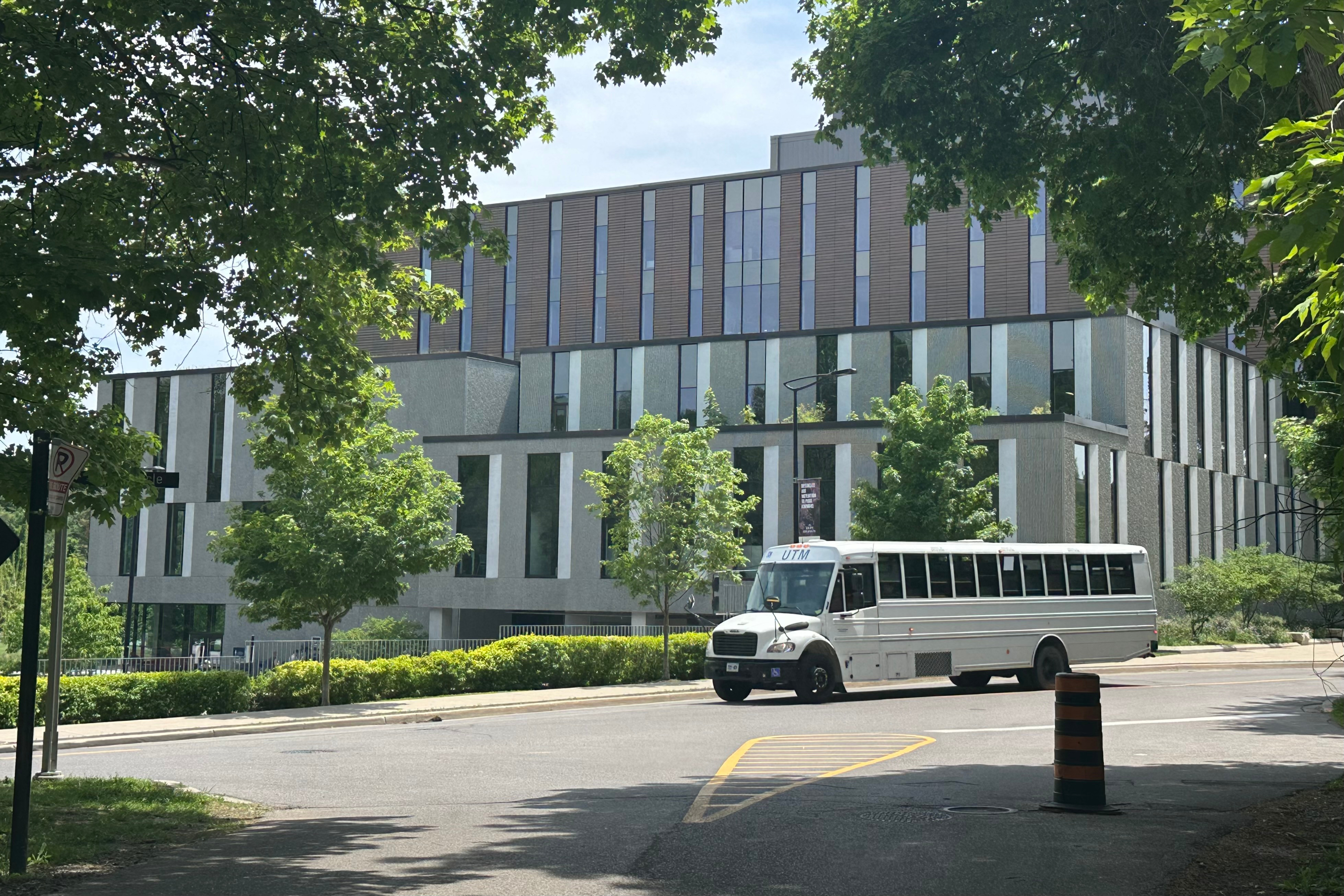
A UTM Shuttle Bus in front of Maanjiwe nendamowinan

A UTM Shuttle Bus stop is located on Outer Circle at the north entrance of Maanjiwe nendamowinan. The stop is on the route between the University of Toronto Mississauga and Sheridan College's Trafalgar Campus intended for students in joint programs with the college.

== In popular culture ==
The Amazon Prime Video series Gen V (2023–2025) filmed its first season in 2022, with the University of Toronto's campuses used for various locations in the show. Maanjiwe nendamowinan is used most extensively for exterior shots of the School of Crimefighting, with some interior hallways used occasionally.

In the medical drama series Doc (2025– ), Maanjiwe nendamowinan filled in for Westside Hospital.

== See also ==
- List of University of Toronto buildings
