= John Andrews (architect) =

Australian architect (1933–2022)

John Andrews AO
- Born: John Hamilton Andrews; 29 October 1933; Sydney, New South Wales
- Died: 24 March 2022 (aged 88); Orange, New South Wales
- Education: University of Sydney; Harvard University
- Occupation: Architect
- Children: Lee Andrews (Landscape Architect)
- Awards: Australian Institute of Architects Gold Medal (1980)
- Practice: John Andrews International
- Buildings: CN Tower, American Express Tower, Sydney Convention Centre, Cameron Offices

John Hamilton Andrews AO LFRAIA HonFAIA FRAIC RIBA (29 October 1933 – 24 March 2022) was an Australian architect, known for designing a number of acclaimed structures in Australia, Canada and the United States. He was Australia's first internationally recognised architect, and the 1980 RAIA Gold Medalist. He died peacefully in his hometown of Orange on 24 March 2022.

== Biography ==
John Andrews was born in Sydney, New South Wales, and graduated with a bachelor's degree from the University of Sydney in 1956. In 1957 he entered the masters of architecture program at Harvard University, where he studied under Sigfried Giedion and José Luis Sert. In 1958, in collaborations with three fellow Harvard students, he entered the design competition for Toronto City Hall and Square, coming in second place. After graduation he worked with John B. Parkin Associates in Don Mills, a suburb of Toronto, until 1962. From 1962 until 1970, he taught in the Architecture program at the University of Toronto's John H. Daniels Faculty of Architecture, Landscape and Design. From 1967 until 1968 John Andrews was Architecture Department chairman there. In 1962 he established John Andrews Architects in Toronto. In 1973 he expanded his practice to Sydney and renamed the firm John Andrews International Pty. Ltd.

From 2007 to 2022 Andrews resided and practiced in Orange in regional New South Wales.

== Partial list of works ==
The following buildings designed either in part or in full by Andrews:

Buildings designed either in part or in full by John Andrews
Building name	Image	Location	Years built	Heritage register(s)	Notes
Australia
Adelaide Convention Centre		Adelaide	1985–1987		Part of Adelaide Station Environs Redevelopment (ASER)
Age of Fishes Museum		Canowindra	1999–2001		(design and construction of the Age of Fishes Museum)
Australian Defence Force Academy (ADFA)		Canberra			
Callam Offices		Woden, Canberra	1977–1981	ACT Heritage Register (NI2008-354)	
Cameron Offices		Belconnen, Canberra	1973–1976	Commonwealth Heritage List (#105410)	(partially demolished)
Hooker Tower		Sydney central business district	1974		
Hyatt Hotel		Perth			
King George Tower (now NRMA House)		Sydney central business district	1976		
Octagon Offices		110 George Street, Parramatta			
RMIT University Student Union and Library		Melbourne City Centre			(subsumed into Building 8)
Sydney Convention and Exhibition Centre		Darling Harbour	1988		Demolished 2014
Convention Centre		Melbourne	1987–1990		
Canada
Bellmere Junior Public School		Toronto	1965		
Africa Place, Expo 67		Montreal, Quebec	1967		
CN Tower		Toronto	1973		(with WZMH Architects)
Andrews Building, University of Toronto Scarborough		Scarborough, Toronto	1963		Also known as the Science Wing and Humanities Wing
South Residence, University of Guelph		Guelph	1968		
Stephen Leacock Collegiate Institute complex		Scarborough, Toronto	1970		(with Abram and Ingleson)
D. B. Weldon Library, University of Western Ontario		London, Ontario	1967		
DeCew Residence, Brock University		St. Catharines, Ontario	1969		(with Salter Fleming Secord)
United States of America
Kent State University School of Art		Kent, Ohio	1972		
Gund Hall, Harvard Graduate School of Design		Cambridge, Massachusetts	1972		
Intelsat Headquarters (former)		Washington, D. C.	1988		
Miami Seaport Passenger Terminal		Miami, Florida	1970		

== Awards and recognition ==
John Andrews was the recipient of many honours and awards including:

- Centennial Medal (Canada)
- Massey Medal (Canada)
- Arnold Brunner Award, National Institute of Arts and Letters (U.S.)
- Ontario Association of Architects 25 Year Award for Scarborough College

He was awarded the RAIA Gold Medal by the Royal Australian Institute of Architects in 1980 and an Honor Award from the American Institute of Architects.

In 1981, Andrews was made an Officer of the Order of Australia (AO) "in recognition of service to architecture".

In 1988 Andrews was conferred with an honorary degree of Doctor of Architecture by the University of Sydney as "...a distinguished graduate of the University of Sydney. His career as an architect in Canada, the United States and Australia established him as one of the very small number of Australian architects with a truly international reputation."

He was further recognised with the John Andrews Award for Commercial Architecture by the ACT Chapter of the Australian Institute of Architects.
