= Mississauga Eagles =

Mississauga Eagles may refer to:

- Mississauga Eagles P.S.C., a Canadian soccer team that played in the Canadian Professional Soccer League in 1998
- Mississauga Eagles FC, a Canadian soccer team that played in the Canadian Soccer League in 2011 and 2012
- UTM Eagles, the intramural sports teams of the University of Toronto Mississauga
