= Recreation, Athletics and Wellness Centre =

Athletic facility at the University of Toronto Mississauga

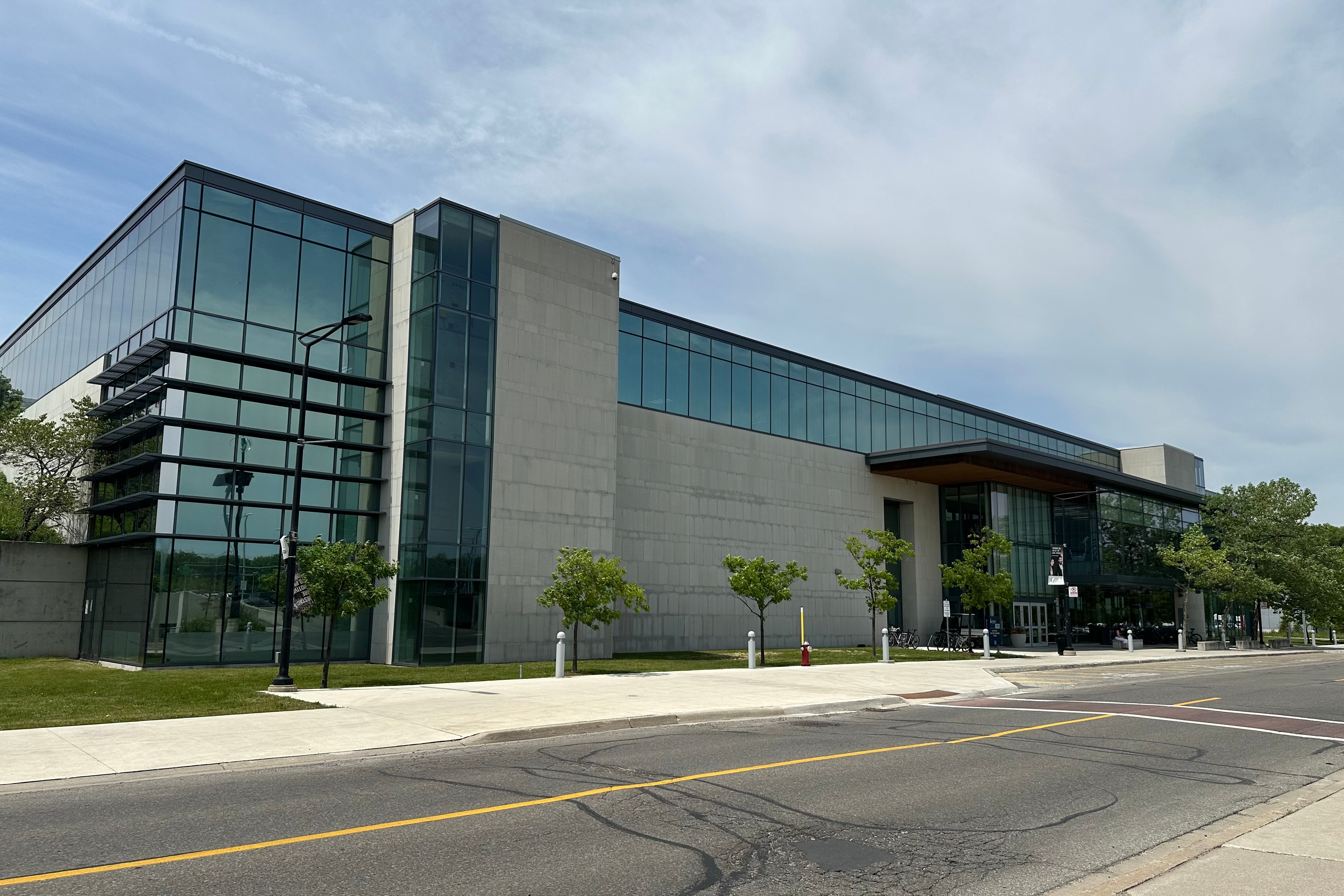
- The building seen from Outer Circle
- Interactive map of Recreation, Athletics and Wellness Centre
- Address: 1825 Outer Circle; Mississauga, Ontario; Canada
- Location: University of Toronto Mississauga
- Coordinates: 43°32′52″N 79°39′39″W
- Owner: University of Toronto
- Capacity: 880 (gym A/B); 200 (pool room)
- Public transit: UTM bus terminal

Construction
- Opened: 2006; 20 years ago
- Cost: $24.5 million
- Architect: Shore Tilbe Irwin & Partners

Tenants
- UTM Recreation, Athletics and Wellness (2006–present); UTM Eagles (CCAA) (2014–2021)

The Recreation, Athletics and Wellness Centre (RAWC, pronounced "rock") is an indoor athletic facility of the University of Toronto located on its Mississauga campus in Mississauga, Ontario, Canada. The RAWC has 74,000 square feet of athletics space, and its main gymnasium has a seating capacity of 880 people. It is the home venue of the UTM Eagles' indoor non-varsity sports teams.

The facility opened in 2006 and cost $24.5 million to build, conjoined with the William G. Davis Building. It includes a double gymnasium with stadium-style seating, a fitness centre, an indoor running track, a 25-metre swimming pool, an Olympic weight lifting room, and teaching studios. The facility is operated by the campus Department of Recreation, Athletics and Wellness (DRAW).

== Facilities ==
Attached to the south end of the Davis Building, the Recreation, Athletics & Wellness Centre includes a gym, weightlifting area, indoor track, four gymnasiums with basketball nets, pickle ball courts, and a 25-metre pool.

The RAWC's main gymnasium, called Gym A/B, has a total seating capacity of 880 people. The gym can be divided in two by a rectangle curtain, where Gym A has a seating capacity of 84 fans and Gym B has a capacity of 72. The indoor pool also has a 200-seat gallery.

The facility was designed by Shore Tilbe Irwin & Partners, and opened with a ceremony attended by then-U of T president David Naylor, chancellor and former Ontario premier David Peterson, Governing Council chair Jack Petch, as well as UTM principal Ian Orchard.

== Uses ==
The RAWC is the only indoor athletic facility on the University of Toronto Mississauga campus, and offers free membership for all University of Toronto students. It is the home venue of the UTM Eagles, the campus's former varsity sports team from 2014 to 2021, who now participate in Ontario Collegiate Recreation (OCR) and U of T intramurals exclusively. The RAWC has also hosted games of the Toronto Varsity Blues, the main collegiate sports team of the university.

Apart from athletics, the RAWC has been used to host various university events such as the Mississauga campus's annual all nations powwow, fairs, and expositions.

== See also ==
- List of University of Toronto buildings
