= University of Guelph =

Public university in Ontario, Canada

- Coat of arms of the university
- Motto: Rerum cognoscere causas (Latin)
- Motto in English: "To learn the reasons of realities"
- Type: Public university
- Established: May 8, 1964 (62 years ago); As constituents: OAC: 1874; Macdonald Institute: 1903; OVC: 1922
- Academic affiliations: CBIE; COU; IAU; Universities Canada
- Endowment: CA$536 million (2025)
- Chancellor: Mary Anne Chambers
- President: Rene Van Acker
- Faculty: 823
- Administrative staff: 3,100
- Students: 30,634
- Undergraduates: 25,325
- Postgraduates: 3,090
- Location: Guelph, Ontario, Canada; 43°32′00″N 80°13′25″W
- Campus: 412 ha (1,017 acres); Urban
- Other campuses: Guelph-Humber; Ridgetown
Colours
Red, gold, black and white
- Nickname: Gryphons
- Sporting affiliations: U Sports – OUA
- Website: www.uoguelph.ca
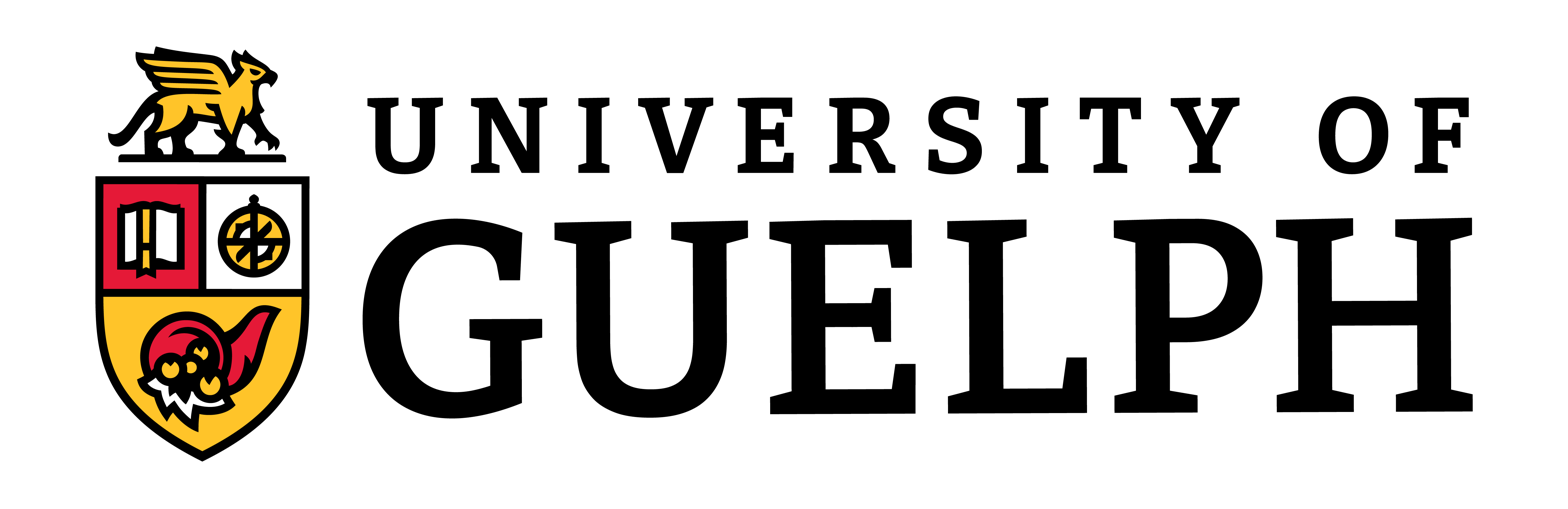

The University of Guelph (U of G or Guelph) is a comprehensive public research university in Guelph, Ontario, Canada. It was established in 1964 after the amalgamation of Ontario Agricultural College (1874), the MacDonald Institute (1903), and the Ontario Veterinary College (1922), and has since grown to an institution of over 30,000 students from more than 140 countries (including those at the Guelph-Humber campus, Ridgetown campus, off-campus degree enrolments, diploma enrolments, and part-time students) and employs 823 full-time faculty as of 2025. It offers 94 undergraduate degrees, 48 graduate programs, and 6 associate degrees in many different disciplines.

The university conducts significant research and offers a wide range of undergraduate, graduate, and professional degrees. According to the Journal of Hospitality & Tourism Research, the university has the highest research index for Hospitality and Tourism Management in Canada.

The faculty at the University of Guelph holds 31 Canada Research Chair positions in the natural sciences, engineering, health sciences, and social sciences. Academic achievements include the first scientific validation of water on Mars, alpha particle X-ray spectrometer (APXS) on board the Curiosity rover, and the Barcode of Life project for species identification.

== History ==
The University of Guelph traces its origins back to when the Ontario government bought 200 hectares (500 acres) of farmland from Frederick William Stone and opened the Ontario School of Agriculture on May 1, 1874, which was renamed the Ontario Agricultural College (OAC) in 1880. The Experimental Farm has been part of the original project along with the museum of agriculture and horticulture. Its first building was Moreton Lodge, located where Johnston Hall now stands, which included classrooms, residences, a library, and a dining room. In 1874, the school started an apiculture department, teaching students about bees and beekeeping, in a dedicated building. In more recent years, the program has continued at the Honey Bee Research Centre in the arboretum, conducting research on honeybee health, offering apiculture and beekeeping courses, and providing "many other educational experiences", including informative videos for beekeepers.

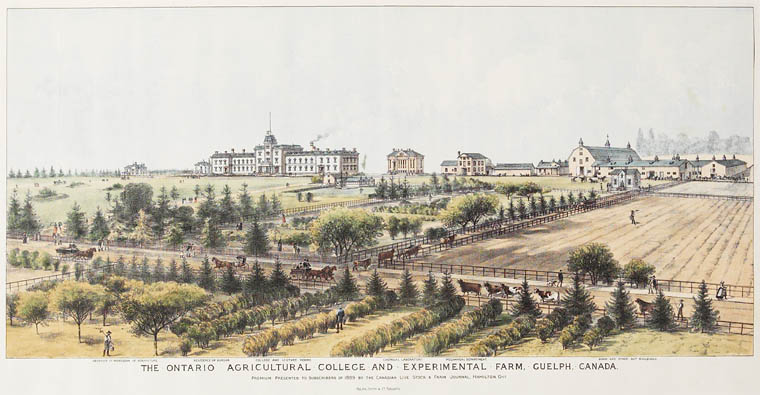
The Ontario Agricultural College and Experimental Farm, Guelph, Canada, 1889

The Macdonald Institute was established in 1903 to house women's home economics programs, nature studies, and some domestic art and science. It was named after its financier, Sir William Macdonald, who worked to promote domestic sciences in rural Canada, and founded Macdonald College and McGill University College of British Columbia. The Ontario Veterinary College (OVC), founded in Mimico in 1862, was moved to Guelph in 1922. Economist John Kenneth Galbraith was an undergraduate at the college (graduating in 1931). In 1919, the Ontario Agricultural College aimed to recruit "farm boys" through a low-cost, two-year program ($20.00 per year) and "the lowest possible rate" for room and board.

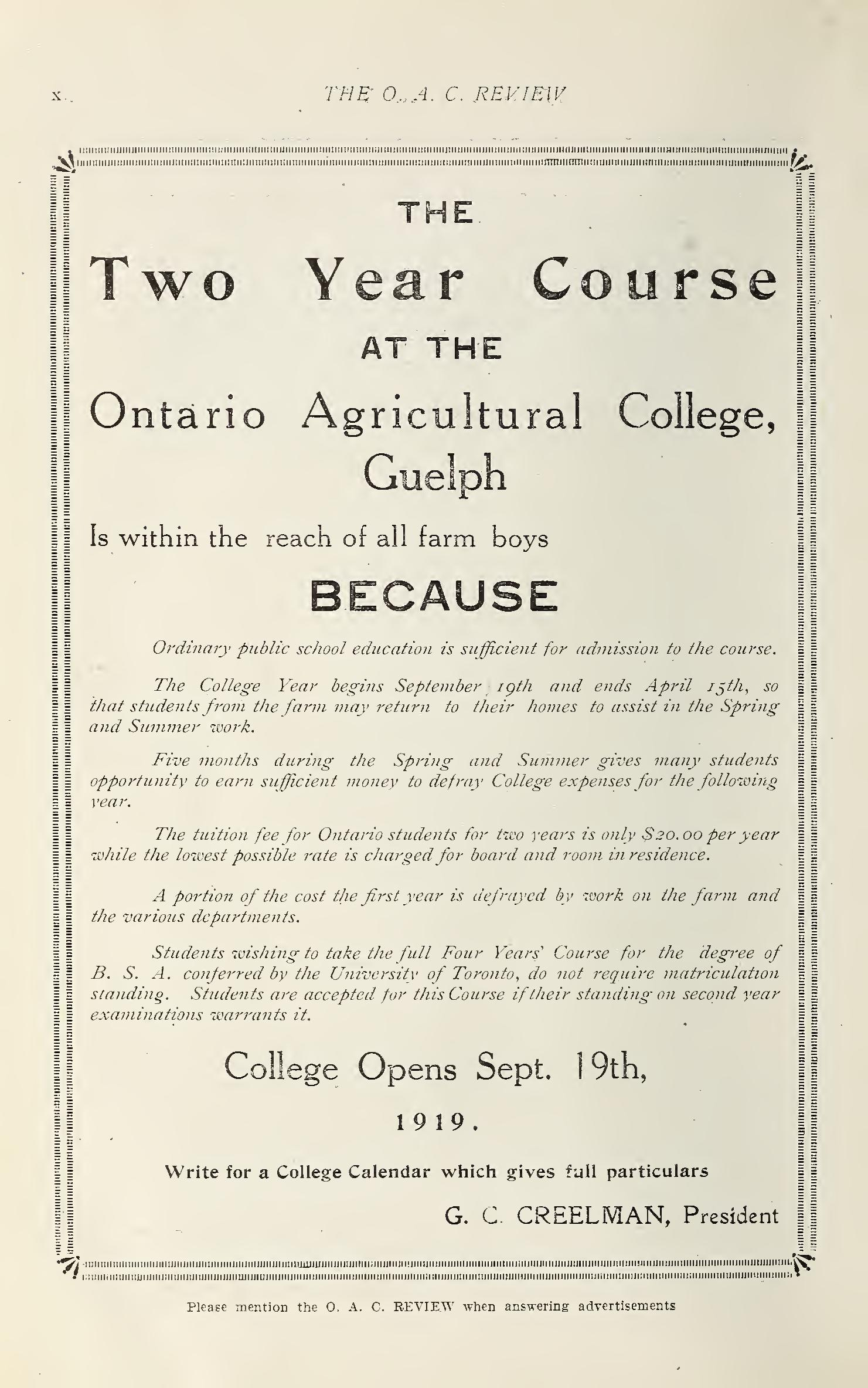
This is an ad for "farm boys" from the Ontario Agricultural College in 1919, recruiting them by talking about the low cost tuition

The Ontario Legislature amalgamated the three colleges into a single body, the University of Guelph, on May 8, 1964. The University of Guelph Act also brought about the Board of Governors to oversee administrative operations and financial management, and the Senate to address academic concerns. The non-denominational graduate and undergraduate institution was, and remains, known especially for its agricultural and veterinary programs.

Wellington College was established shortly after the University of Guelph Act and, five years later, was split into three colleges: the College of Arts (COA), which exists in the present day; the College of Physical Science; and the College of Social Science. The Macdonald Institute would also be renamed the College of Family and Consumer Studies during the split. After this split, the University of Guelph started reorganizing into its present-day form, starting from the establishment of the College of Biological Sciences (CBS) in 1971. The College of Physical Science would merge with the OAC's School of Engineering in 1989, creating the College of Engineering and Physical Sciences (CEPS). The College of Social Science and the College of Family and Consumer Studies were joined to create the College of Social and Applied Human Sciences (CSAHS) in 1998. Finally, the College of Management and Economics (CME) was established in 2006 through the segregation of business, management, and economics degrees and courses.

The university is named after the city. Guelph comes from the Italian Guelfo and the Bavarian-Germanic Welf, also known as Guelf. It is a reference to the reigning British monarch at the time Guelph was founded, King George IV, whose family was from the House of Hanover, a younger branch of the House of Welf was sometimes spelled as Gwelf.

== Campuses ==
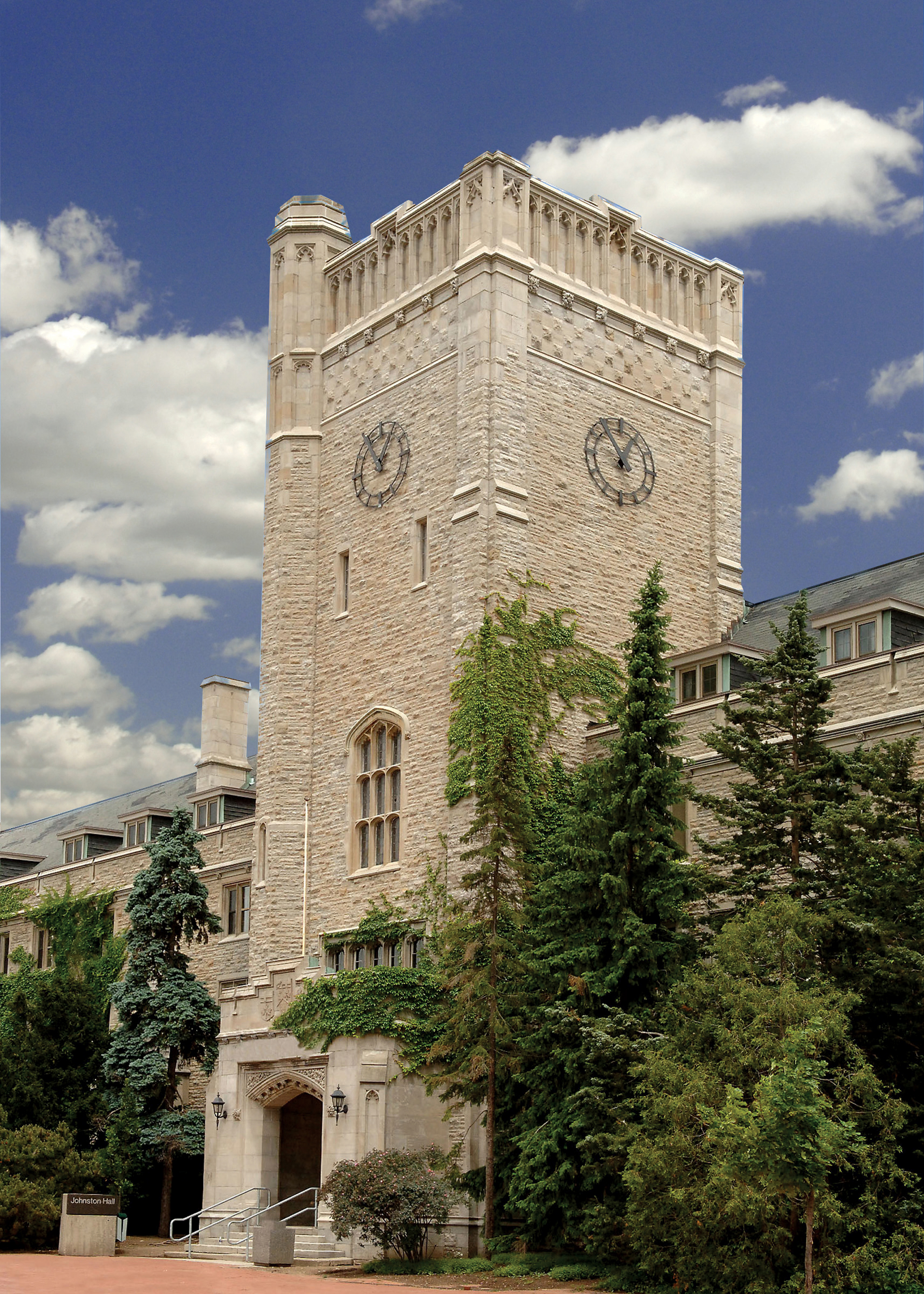
The Johnston Clock Tower at the main campus

=== Main campus ===
The University of Guelph's main campus lies in Guelph, Ontario, residing on traditional Anishinaabe and Haudenosaunee territory. The campus, approximately a 1 hour drive west of Toronto, is 412 hectares, including a 12-hectare Research Park and a 165-hectare arboretum.

The university's oldest buildings date back to the 19th century, with the oldest building on campus being Alumni House, built in 1879. Visible from much of the campus is Johnston Hall, a signature symbol of the university and one of its most recognizable landmarks. Built in 1931 as the new home for the Ontario Agricultural College's administration, it was constructed on the site of the torn-down Moreton Lodge, which had been built in the early 1870s. The portico from the original building, preserved after its demolition, remains on Johnston Green.

Campus safety at the main campus is the responsibility of the Campus Safety Office, which includes Special Constables, Dispatchers, Fire Prevention Officers, and the First Response Team.

==== Academic Facilities ====
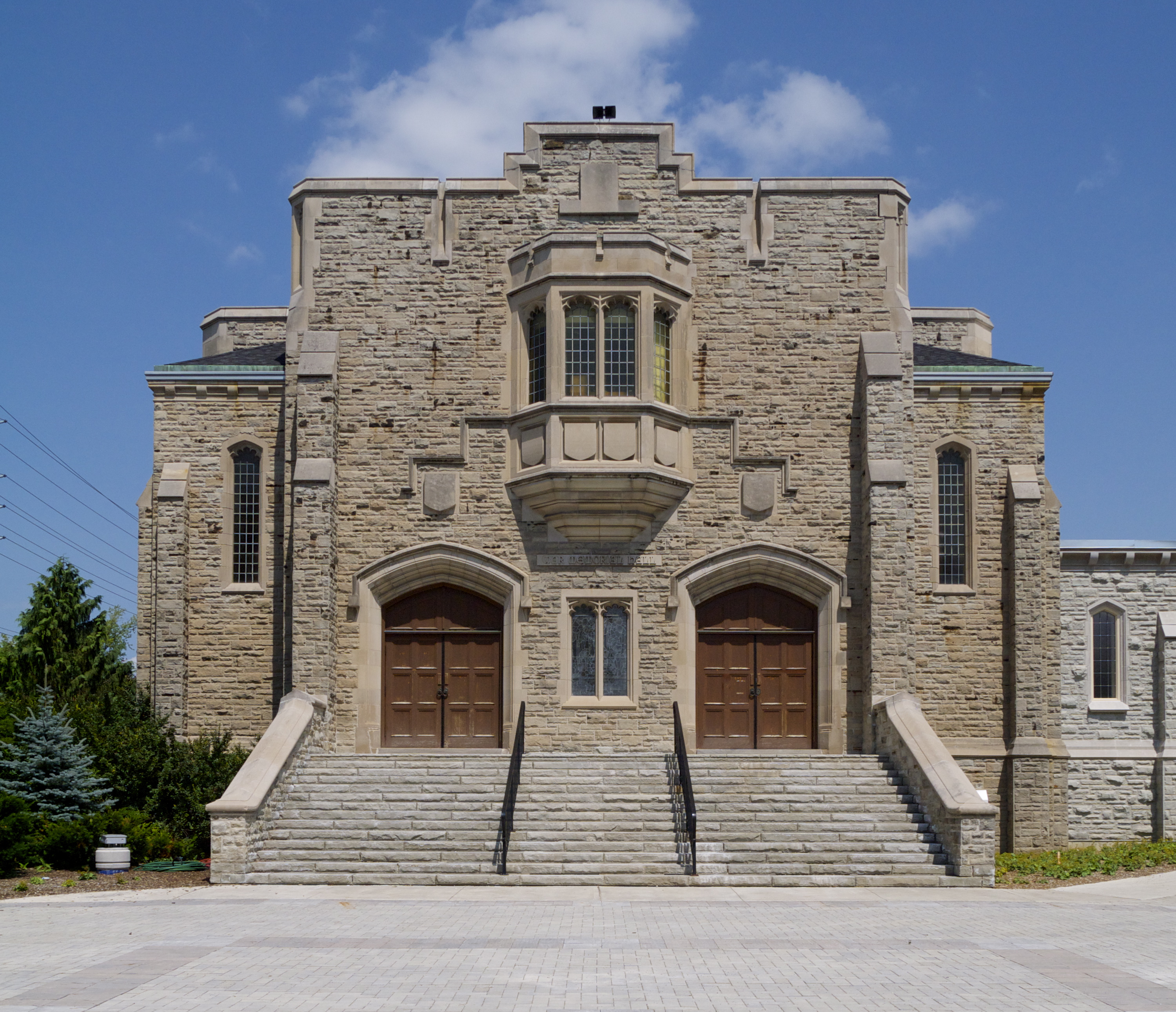
War Memorial Hall, built in 1924

The War Memorial Hall was erected in 1924 of stone-cut limestone by the Ontario Agriculture College; the landmark building was designed by architect Harry Reginald Coales as a lecture hall or theatre to honour students who had enlisted and died in the First World War. Two bronze tablets in the Memorial Chapel remember the alums who died in the First World War and in the Second World War.

Rozanski Hall, completed in 2003, is situated at the heart of the main campus. Equipped with electronic whiteboards, laptop sound, picture, wireless internet, and high-luminance video/data projectors, Rozanski Hall can concurrently accommodate over 1,500 students in several lecture halls.

The Summerlee Science Complex, completed in 2007, is a classroom and research complex built with the assistance of the Province of Ontario's Super Build program primarily for student learning and scientific research. The complex is also home to U of G's Advanced Analysis Centre (AAC), which is a group of research laboratories and is a modern, centralized, and highly serviced space for large-scale advanced analytical laboratories and provides an unequalled range of capabilities for research and advanced education at the interface of the physical and biological sciences. AAC contains over $40 million worth of research equipment within an area of over 1000 square meters.

In 2024, the Summerlee Science Complex atrium was renamed Waasamowin, which means "to be bathed in light", in support of efforts to Indigenize science at U of G and support and retain Indigenous students in STEM. Waasamowin is one of the favourite gathering spaces for students, faculty, and staff, and can accommodate a gathering of 200 students.

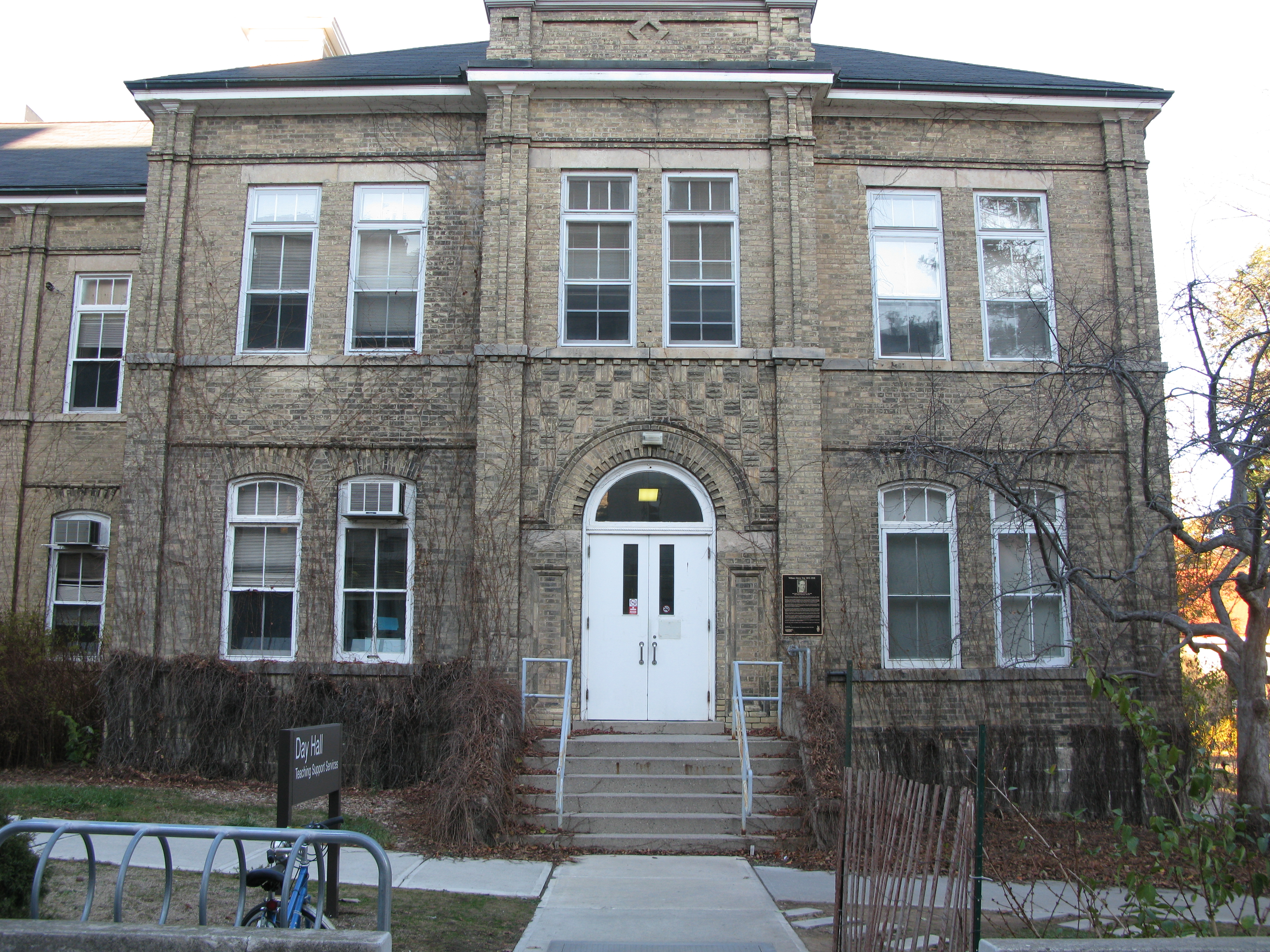
Day Hall, built in 1895

Originally built in the 1940s and expanded in the 1950s, the W.F. Mitchell Athletic Centre was upgraded and again expanded in the fall of 2016 to accommodate the needs of the university and the growth of the population of the city of Guelph since the 1950s. After a student referendum in 2010, students chose to contribute $45 million to the innovation of the W.F Mitchell Athletic Centre. The new 170,000-square-foot Athletic Centre serves as an all-purpose building, supporting students, athletes, and the public through a variety of new spaces, including a 22,000-square-foot fitness room, multiple gymnasiums, and a rock-climbing wall. It also includes multiple swimming pools, a jogging track, and a variety of fitness programs.

On June 25, 1988, No. 4 Wireless School Association erected a bronze plaque as a war memorial to the Royal Canadian Air Force No. 4 Wireless School, which was located on the campus (1941–1945); the plaque honours the memory of their comrades who died in the armed service of Canada during World War II.

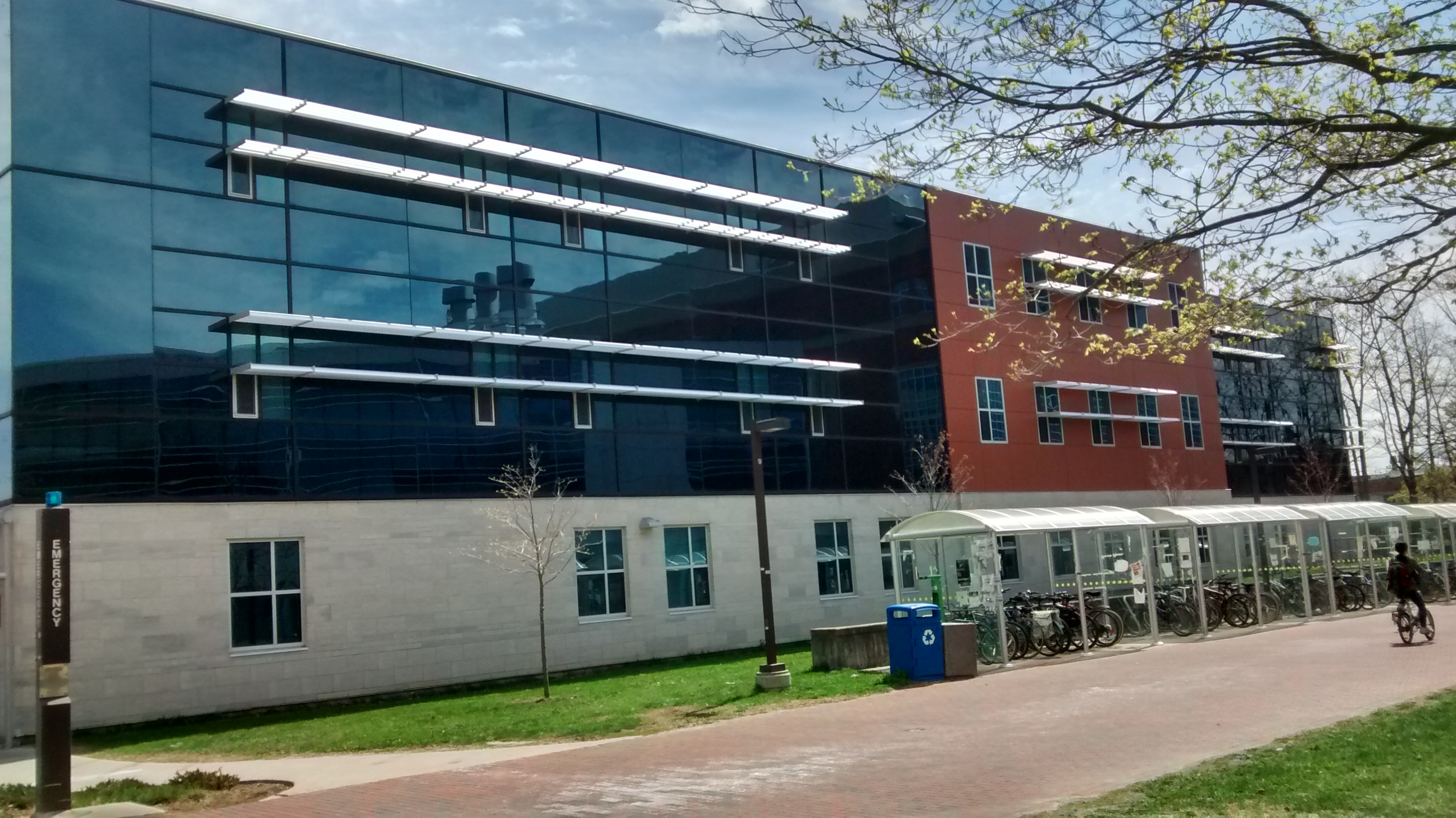
Alexander Hall (formerly Axelrod)

==== Library and art gallery ====
The six-storey McLaughlin Library provides students with more than 400 computers and access to books, periodicals, films, audiovisual and archival materials, government documents, and maps. During the 2017/2018 school year, the library received over 1.4 million visitors.

Students have access to millions of library resources through the automated library system that partners with 14 other academic libraries in Ontario. Guelph students, faculty, and staff also have access to electronic resources from any location at any time.

The MacDonald Stewart Art Centre, which includes the University of Guelph collection, is cosponsored by the University of Guelph and is located adjacent to the Northern end of campus at Gordon Street and College Avenue. The art centre is a public gallery and sculpture park that houses a collection of 4000 works, mainly Canadian, from c. 1700 to the present. The collection consists of mixed media, multimedia, and installations; painting; photography; prints and drawings; sculpture; costumes; glass; metalwork; silverwork and goldwork; textiles; and tapestries.

==== Housing and student facilities ====
Over 5,000 students live in on-campus residences, making the university home to the largest residence system in Ontario. The on-campus residences are made up of 16 communities and 4 residence styles.

South Residence, the largest residence on campus, is home to 1800 students and over 50 Residence Life staff members. It is split into three self-contained halls (Mountain Hall, Maritime Hall, and Prairie Hall) with independent fire alarm grids. It was built in 1968 by Australian architect John Andrews, a Brutalist architect who has designed several Canadian university residences, as well as Toronto's iconic CN Tower. The residence includes single, double, and triple rooms, and each student is required to purchase a meal plan. It is a co-ed residence with small alcoves and shared bathrooms.

Johnston Hall is one of the University of Guelph's best-known landmarks. It is a co-ed residence, home to 315 students.

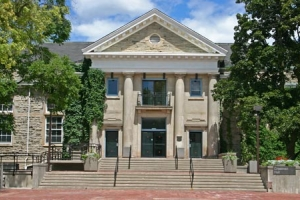
Creelman Hall, one of the many hospitality locations on campus

Lennox and Addington halls, commonly known as LA, are two linked buildings in the North area of campus. It is home to 575 students and includes single and double rooms.

Lambton Hall is a co-ed residence in the North area of campus, home to over 380 students in both suites and traditional single and double rooms.

Watson Hall is the only female-only residence, home to 50 female students.

The East residences comprise the East Village Townhouses and the East Towers. The townhouses have 164 units, with the majority having four single bedrooms. The towers consist of Glengarry, Lanark, and Dundas Hall, which house 610 residents. Groups of 6–12 students live in single or double rooms in an apartment-style suite. All East residences are co-ed, and purchasing a meal plan is optional as each unit includes a full kitchen or a kitchenette.

In mid-2024, the Days Inn hotel on Gordon Street was converted into a new temporary student residence, Gordon Hall, due to a massive increase in the number of first-year students joining in September. The University of Guelph has leased the building for three years (terminating in August 2026) and rebranded it to reflect a regular on-campus residence. The building currently has 86 rooms and holds a total of 169 students. In August 2025, the University of Guelph decided to extend their lease on the former Days Inn until April/May 2028. With slight changes, the building can now accommodate a total of 178 students.

On October 30, 2026, the University of Guelph officially began constructing a new residence building that is to be entirely owned and operated by the university to accommodate the increasing number of incoming students. Set at the southwest corner of College Avenue and McGilvray street, the residence (referred to by the university as the "78 College Residence Development" as of 2026) is to be a two-tower building with a six-storey north quad and a seven-story south quad, totalling 370,000 square feet of residence space. The new development is to include traditional dormitory-style rooms and suites totalling 1,250 beds, community and study spaces on each floor, as well as a 450-seat dining hall and two pedestrian-friendly outdoor courtyards. The university plans to welcome the first set of first-year students into the 78 College residence in fall 2029. The project is estimated at $275 million.

=== Ontario Agricultural College (OAC) campuses ===
The Ontario Agricultural College had a network of campuses and research stations throughout Ontario which were operated by the Ministry of Agriculture, Food, and Rural Affairs. At one time, courses were offered in English in Guelph, Kemptville and Ridgetown, and in French at Campus d'Alfred near Ottawa. From 1889 to 1961, this college published the OAC Review, a magazine for and by students, covering everything from political and social events to photographs from around campus.

In 2014, the University of Guelph announced that academic programmes at the Alfred and Kemptville campuses would close after the existing students completed their studies. In early 2017, the University of Guelph website clearly indicated that this institution was no longer offering programs at either location.

The OAC operates in Guelph and at the Ridgetown campus in Ridgetown, Ontario, at the former Ridgetown College of Agricultural Technology, on over 180 hectares (450 acres) of land. It does not offer degree programs in this location; instead, the focus is on technology transfer, with two- and three-year diploma programs. Specialties are agriculture, veterinary technology, environmental management, and horticulture. This location also offers one-year certificate programs in performance horse handling and veterinary office administration. There is also an apprenticeship program for Dairy Herdsperson (new for 2017).

=== University of Guelph-Humber ===
The University of Guelph-Humber is a satellite campus created in 2002 by a partnership between the University of Guelph and Humber College. Located on Humber's North Campus in Toronto, it offers seven four-year academic programs that grant an honours degree from the University of Guelph and a college diploma from Humber College.

As of the 2024/2025 academic year, 4,523 students were enrolled at the University of Guelph-Humber. 78% of these were full-time students and 22% were part-time students.

== Administration ==
The governance of the University of Guelph is a bicameral system consisting of the Senate and the Board of Governors. The Senate consists of faculty, students, administrative staff, librarians, and alums. It is responsible for academic policies and programming, including admission requirements, program creation/modification/deletion, examinations, and academic misconduct. The Board of Governors consists of a combination of government-appointed representatives, faculty, staff, alums, and students. It is responsible for the university's general business and administration, including finance, capital planning, human resources, and ancillary services.

== Academics ==
=== Joint graduate programs ===
- Guelph-Waterloo Centre for Graduate Work in Chemistry and Biochemistry (GWC2) is one of Canada's largest and most successful graduate schools.
- Guelph-Waterloo Physics Institute (GWPI) is a joint graduate program offered by the Departments of Physics at the University of Waterloo and Guelph.

=== Colleges ===
The University of Guelph is composed of eight colleges, delivering leading teaching and research across a range of disciplines:

- College of Arts
- College of Biological Science
- Gordon S. Lang School of Business and Economics
- College of Computational, Mathematical and Physical Sciences
- College of Engineering
- College of Social and Applied Human Sciences
- Ontario Agricultural College
- Ontario Veterinary College

=== Courses ===
A Taylor Swift course launched in early 2025. It is a 12-week program that ran from January to April for 600 University of Guelph students. The case study is a part of the University of Guelph's Icons of Music op-ed course. It was co-designed by Alyssa Woods and Robert Michael Edwards, two professors at the institution. This program takes a different approach by examining the key issues in today's pop music culture. It examines how art, literature, sexuality, and religion intersect with pop culture and pop music. The course will also include an examination of the Canadian leg of Taylor Swift's The Eras Tour.

=== Rankings and reputation ===
University rankings

World rankings
- ARWU World: 501–600
- QS World: =504
- THE World: 401–500
- USNWR World: 540
- 19–20

Canadian rankings
- QS National: 19
- THE National: 17–19
- USNWR National: 18
- Maclean's Comprehensive: 6
- Maclean's Reputation: 17

The University of Guelph is one of Canada's top comprehensive and research-intensive universities.

In the 2024 Research Infosource Inc. ranking of Canada's Top 50 Research Universities, U of G was ranked second in the comprehensive category.f

In 2025, U of G was ranked in the top 6 for Best Comprehensive University, and #1 for Total Research Dollars according to the 2025 Maclean's University Rankings.

2025 Times Higher Education (THE) World University Rankings by subject ranked the University of Guelph among the top 150 universities in the world for life sciences.

U of G placed 201–300 among the top universities in world for reputation and tied for ninth among Canadian institutions according to the 2025 Times Higher Education (THE) World Reputation Rankings.

The University of Guelph has also been named as one of the world's top universities for the study of 12 subjects, according to the QS World University Rankings by Subject 2025:

- U of G's Ontario Veterinary College (OVC) placed sixth worldwide and first in Canada for Veterinary Science.
- The Ontario Agricultural College (OAC) ranked 30th in the world and second in Canada for agriculture and forestry.
- The Gordon S. Lang School of Business and Economics placed in the 51–100 ranking globally and tied for first in Canada for hospitality and leisure management.

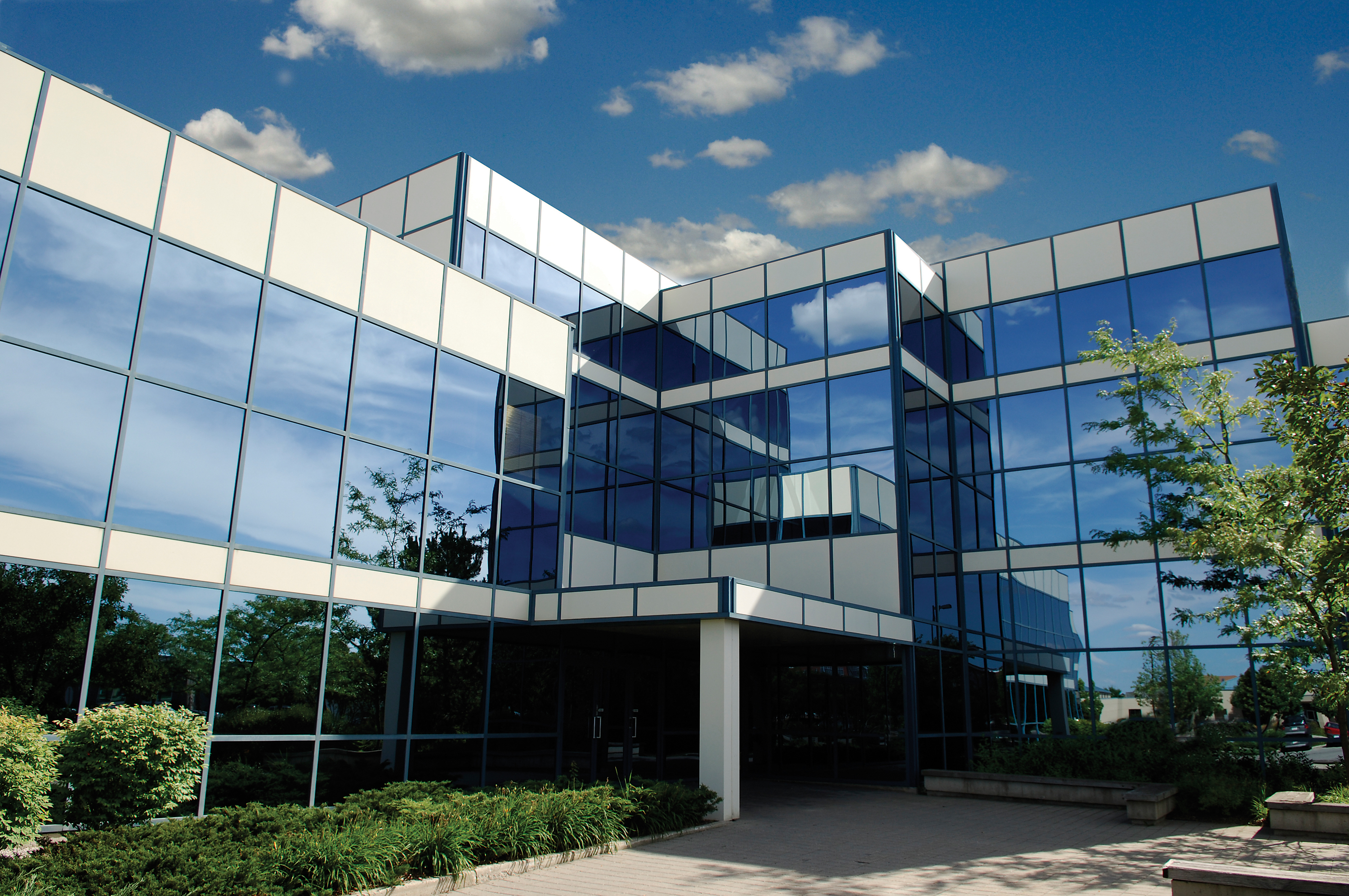
The university's Research Park Centre

In the Canadian University Report by The Globe and Mail, Guelph was ranked in the top 3 in 15 of 19 categories among medium-sized universities. This included the top spot in course registration, academic counselling, student residences, information technology, campus atmosphere, environmental commitment, and work-play balance.

According to a 2012 study by The Impact Group, the University of Guelph was, at the time, Canada's most inventive university in terms of invention disclosures per full-time faculty member and the number of inventions per million dollars of research funding.

Forbes ranked this university as number 61 on its list of Canada's Best Employers 2019. The magazine stated, "Guelph is considered one of Canada's top universities for its rigorous academic offerings combined with experiential learning and research training".

Additionally, the University of Guelph's Sustainability MBA program was ranked as the best sustainability MBA in Canada and ninth in the world during the 16th annual Better World MBA Rankings in 2018 by the Toronto-based Corporate Knights.

== Collaborations ==
Canadian Space Agency

The CSA supports current research and innovation for space instruments, primarily the APXS found on the Mars rovers and the Mars Science Laboratory. Other initiatives include developing air filters for crewed spacecraft and researching changes in astronauts' skin sensitivity and balance in space.

RIM

The university holds a partnership with Research In Motion (RIM) through the Center for Mobile Education and Research, the chair for Women in Science and Engineering and the financial and educational support RIM extends to the University of Guelph.

Huawei

The university receives research funding from Huawei but has not disclosed the details of the funding.

Career fair at Bingeman's Park

A collaborative effort between the University of Waterloo, the University of Guelph, Wilfrid Laurier University, and Conestoga College, the Partnerships for Employment Career Fair is the largest in the country.

Collaboration with the Government of Ontario

The Ontario Agri-Food Innovation Alliance is a partnership between the University of Guelph and the Ontario Ministry of Agriculture, Food and Agribusiness that conducts research, provides laboratory services and supports student training for the agri-food sector.

Emperor Investments – Alumni of the John F. Wood Centre for Business and Student Enterprise business incubator

The University of Guelph's John F. Wood Centre for Business and Student Enterprise business incubator provided funds, space, and mentorship to Emperor Investments, which has developed an automated investment platform that focuses on personalized pure-equity investment portfolios for small investors.

== Student life ==
=== Organizations ===
Demographics of student body (2024–25)
	Undergraduate	Graduate
Male	40.8%	40.0%
Female	59.2%	60.0%
Canadian student	95.9%	74.9%
International student	4.1%	25.1%

The university's Student Organization Policy officially governs the student government on campus. This document, created in 2005 and revised in 2026, provides the basis for accrediting student groups on campus. The student groups listed as Primary Student Organizations under the policy are:

- Central Student Association (CSA)
- Graduate Students' Association (GSA)
- College of Arts Student Union (CASU)
- College of Biological Science Student Council (CBSSC)
- Gordon S. Lang School of Business and Economics Students' Association (LSA)
- College of Computing, Mathematics, & Physical Sciences Student Council (CCMPSSC)
- Engineering Society (EngSoc)
- College of Social & Applied Human Sciences Student Alliance (CSAHS-SA)
- Student Federation of the Ontario Agricultural College (SFOAC)
- Central Veterinary Students' Association (CVSA)
- Interhall Council (IHC)

Each of the above PSOs is accredited and thus accountable for many of the campus's clubs and student groups. The CSA accredits the most student groups, with approximately 200 accredited today. Generally, CSA-accredited groups are special-interest groups (such as Curtain Call Productions, a musical theatre club), political groups (such as the Guelph Young Liberals) or religious groups (such as the Muslim Students' Association). The College Governments (CASU, CBSSC, LSA, CCMPSSC, EngSoc, CSAHS-SA, SFOAC, and the CVSA) accredit academically focused groups. In contrast, IHC accredits 14 groups (including the temporary residence Gordon Hall for 2022–2027) as hall councils, one for each residence hall on campus.

Across the campus, members of the Residence Student Government, known as Interhall Council, contribute to the programming in each hall. This group of 62 elected members works with students within their halls and is also responsible for facilitating a hall council for hall members to attend. During the 2011/2012 year, a council was struck at the West Residence Family Housing units and the temporary Brock House residence, bringing the total number of councils to 14. Interhall Council also serves as a liaison among students, Student Housing Services, the University Administration, and other on-campus organizations.

=== Media ===
Newspapers and magazines

- The Ontarion – since 1951 and publishes monthly
- At Guelph – university's official newspaper
- The Portico – magazine sent to alumni each semester to keep them in touch with the university
- Osnap – a monthly humour publication put out by the engineering society covering events
- Kaleidoscope – student-run magazine of art and creative writing published twice a year (Fall semester and Winter semester)

Radio

- CFRU-FM is a community campus station serving the students and community of Guelph.

Former student media

- The Cannon – Originally launched in 2002 as a student media website co-founded by the Guelph Campus Co-op and the Central Student Association (CSA), The Cannon featured student-submitted articles, event listings, and opinion pieces. It has since shifted away from student journalism and now primarily operates as a classifieds platform for students to buy and sell housing, textbooks, and other items. The site's name references Old Jeremiah, a cannon on campus that has traditionally served as a public message board.
- Hornblower: The HTM Magazine – Published from 1973 to 2021, the Hornblower was the official publication of the School of Hospitality and Tourism Management.

=== Athletics ===
The university is represented in the Ontario University Athletics and U Sports by the Guelph Gryphons. The school colors are red, black, and yellow or gold. UofG's mascot is a Gryphon named Gryph. There are 19 intramural teams, 20 varsity teams, and 22 sports clubs. OUA only sports include baseball (men), figure skating (men & women), golf, Nordic skiing, rowing, and rugby union (men). Currently, 7 out of every 10 Guelph students participate in athletics, recreation, or fitness programming.

Nationally, the OUA is one of the CIS conferences, along with Atlantic University Sport, Canada West Universities Athletic Association, and the Quebec Student Sports Federation. CIS sports which UG participates in include basketball, cross country running, field hockey (women), Canadian football (men), ice hockey, rugby union (women), soccer, swimming, track & field, volleyball and wrestling.

The Gryphon's men's football team won its only national championship in 1984. In 2008, the Gryphon's men's lacrosse team won the Baggataway Cup at the Canadian national field lacrosse championships with a 14–9 win over McGill University at Ron Joyce Stadium in Hamilton. The Gryphons are particularly well known for their exploits in athletics, having won the men's and women's cross-country titles consecutively ten times (2006–2014) and eleven times (2005–2016), respectively. The field hockey team won the national title in 2011.

In 2020, the university track-and-field head coach, David Scott-Thomas, was given a lifetime ban by Athletics Canada for violating its code of conduct. The Globe and Mail reported that Scott-Thomas had an alleged sexual relationship with an underage student athlete dating back to 2002–2004 (of consenting age, but unlawful with a person in a position of trust or authority) and multiple students also accused him of having fostered a toxic sporting culture for many years. The university faced heavy criticism over its handling of the scandal when the reporting revealed that the administration had been aware of the allegations since 2006, but did little to address them and continued to employ the coach. It was reported that the university quietly ended its relationship with Scott-Thomas and assistant coach Guyson Kuruneri in December 2019 after The Globe and Mail presented the university with the allegations against both Scott-Thomas and the administration's handling of the 2006 and more recent complaints, and requested an interview with the school administrators. More than 200 faculty and staff wrote a letter to the university president demanding transparency and an independent review. In the letter, they categorized the content of The Globe and Mail report as "evidence of the worst kind of abuse of power" and indicated that "high-level administrators at the time may have participated in willfully ignoring and minimizing this abuse."

In 2021, a group of alumni from the university track and field program wrote an open letter expressing concerns that "the systems that enabled the health and well-being of many athletes to be harmed by individuals in positions of power are still in place," and urging the university "to undertake an independent, comprehensive, and transparent investigation to determine how its existing policies failed to protect student-athletes from an abusive environment.". The University eventually agreed to engage with these alumni in a restorative justice process, which concluded in 2025.

=== Traditions ===
==== Painting Old Jeremiah ====
Old Jeremiah

Old Jeremiah is the name of an antique British naval gun that rests along Winegard Walk in Branion Plaza, at the heart of the University of Guelph campus. Rumoured to have seen battle during the War of 1812, Old Jeremiah was last fired in April 1913. After World War I, the gun's barrel was plugged, and it was brought to campus by students as a sign of remembrance for those lost in battle. It is often referred to simply and affectionately as The Cannon. During the 1970s, Old Jeremiah was briefly relocated to Johnston Green and renamed the Big Johnston.

As a result of jovial rivalry between Engineering and Agricultural Science students ("Aggies"), the cannon has seen plenty of movement around the Guelph campus through practical jokes between the two majors. Although it is nearly impossible to determine the cannon's previous locations, it is rumoured to have traveled all over campus, at one point even perching on top of MacNaughton (a prominent university building containing the bookstore), and at another even disappearing altogether and showing up a day later on the University of Western Ontario campus. Eventually, fed up with Old Jeremiah's movement, university officials cemented the cannon in place, where it sits today. However, as a final stab at humour, a group of students shifted the still-mobile cannon's direction and aimed it at the fourth floor of the University Center, home of the institution's senior administration. Old Jeremiah rests in this position today. Due to its appearance at the University of Western Ontario ("Western"), this sparked a long rivalry between the 2 universities.

Despite its movement, the cannon enjoyed relative tranquility until the 1950s, when an aspiring entrepreneurial student came up with the idea of painting a message on the highly visible landmark. The act of "painting the cannon" has since become a campus tradition, with students, residents, sports teams, clubs, and others braving the early morning hours to paint messages on the cannon, most often about upcoming events but also including birthday announcements, wedding proposals, and insults. The etiquette governing "painting the cannon" is unofficial but well understood: 1) do not begin painting the cannon until the sun has set, 2) be finished by the time the first students arrive for classes in the morning, and 3) avoid profanity or coarse language. It is a well-accepted practice to "guard" the cannon until sunrise to avoid another person or group painting over one's message.

In fall 2010, Master of Fine Arts student and art teacher Dawn Johnston began stripping Old Jeremiah of the layers of paint it had accumulated since the 1950s as an art project. Calling it "[her] form of sculpture", Johnston completed the project over a week within a wooden enclosure to avoid the watchful eyes of passing students. Some students were upset about the removal, claiming Johnston was "taking away [their] history", although the project was done with the approval of university faculty. Upon completion, the enclosure was removed, revealing the bare cannon; however, the tradition of painting Old Jeremiah has since resumed.

==== Pep rally ====
During the University of Guelph's orientation program, which takes place each year at the beginning of Orientation Week, all new students within each residence are taught a dance–often referred to as the Hall Boogie–which is performed to a variety of mixed popular songs. Awards are presented to the Halls that demonstrate the best spirit, creativity, synchronization, and coordination. Many of the dances are very impressive, despite being practised for typically an hour or less.

A University of Guelph dance move, Winding Your Toy, is almost always incorporated into each boogie, usually to a bass-heavy dance track. A winding motion is made with the rear hand–as if winding a wind-up toy–while the knees are bent in rhythm. The origins of "winding the toy" are not well known, yet it retains notoriety among students and friends of students at the university.

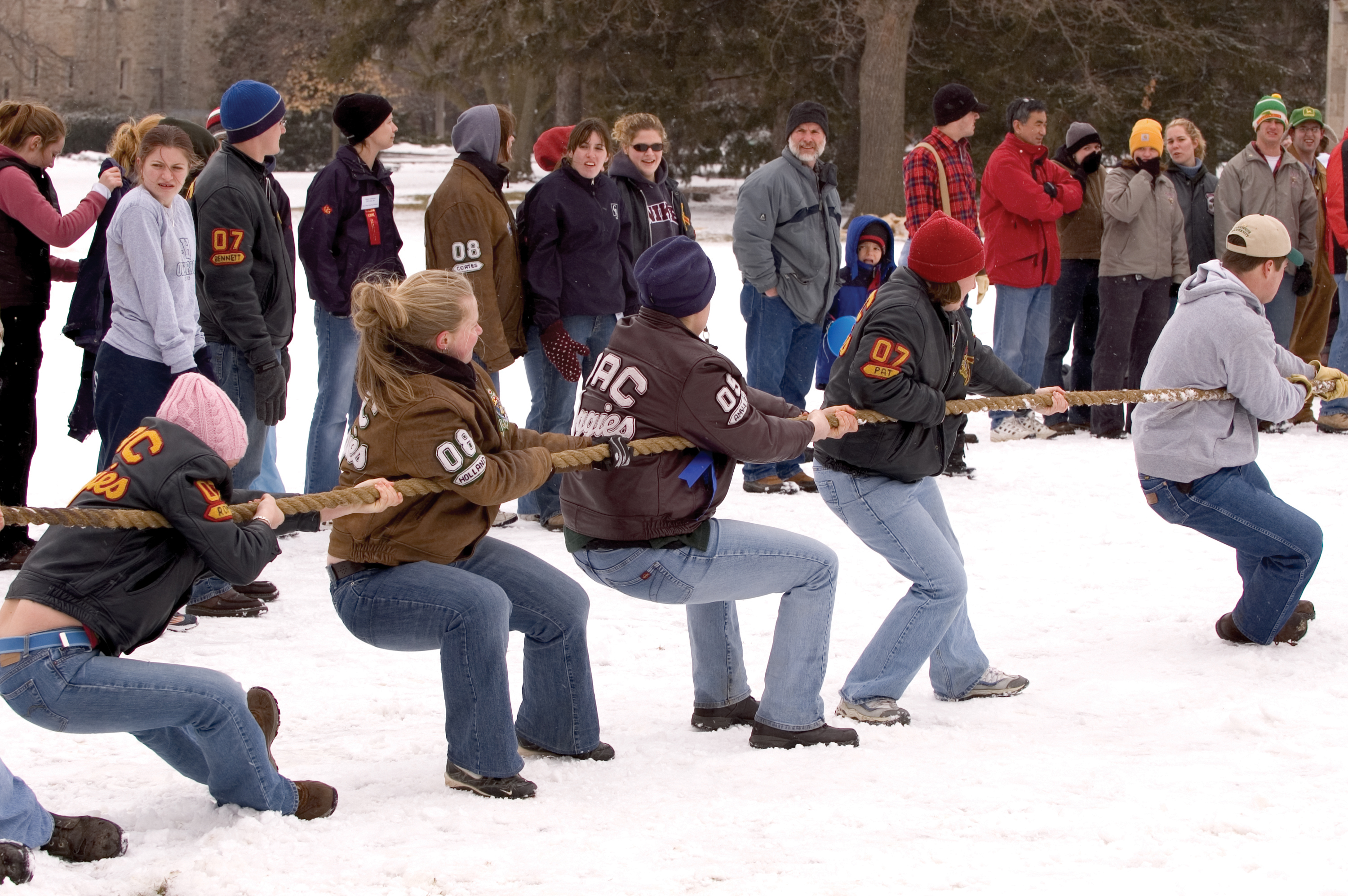
A team of Aggies during tug-of-war at College Royal in 2010

The rally is the kick-off to the remainder of the orientation activities. The University of Guelph must apply for a special noise permit for the event, as the activity can often be heard for miles.

In 2004, "Student Power" was introduced as a low-key alternative to the Pep Rally for anyone who may not be inclined to participate in the highly energetic, boisterous event.

During the renovation of the location where the Pep Rally is held (the school's football field) in 2012, an event named "Rally for Change" was held in place, in which hundreds of University of Guelph students went out into the local community and did street performances to raise money for Cancer research. The Pep Rally was held on a later date. This event has since become a tradition, with plans to incorporate it into the orientation program in 2013.

==== College Royal ====
College Royal is the largest student-run open house in North America, normally run the third weekend in March. College Royal consists of approximately two weeks of events for students leading up to the open house, including the College Royal Ball. The open house allows community members to tour various university buildings and involves a variety of events including livestock shows, club displays, and a pancake breakfast.

College Royal began in 1925 as an opportunity for Ontario Agricultural College students to gain experience showing livestock. It was named after the Royal Agricultural Winter Fair held in Toronto. It expanded in the following decades to include a variety of different events. In 2024, College Royal celebrated its 100th anniversary.

The 2006 College Royal was visited by Rick Mercer, taping a segment for his show, the Rick Mercer Report.

== See also ==
- Canadian government scientific research organizations
- Canadian industrial research and development organizations
- Canadian Interuniversity Sport
- Canadian university scientific research organizations
- Higher education in Ontario
- List of Ontario Universities
- Muck Crops Research Station
- Ontario Student Assistance Program
- University of Guelph Arboretum
