= Johnston Hall (University of Guelph) =

Coordinates: 43.53308°N 80.22848°W

- Front of Johnston Hall, 2026.

Facts
- Location: Guelph, Ontario
- Former Name: Moreton Lodge
- Founder: William Johnston
- Built: 1931
- Nickname: J-Hall
- Mascot: Dragon
- Governing Body: University of Guelph
- Primary Use: Residence Hall, Ontario Agricultural College(OAC), Office of Teaching & Learning (temporary), School of Continuing Studies, Campus Co-op Bookstore
- Map Location: Click here to see Johnston Hall on a map

Johnston Hall at the University of Guelph was named after William Johnston (1848–1885) who was the founder and first principal of the Ontario Agricultural College from 1874 to 1879. Johnston Hall was built in 1931 as a student residence and home of administrative offices. Johnston Hall is the second building that opened in 1932 as the first building, the Italianate-style Moreton Lodge, was demolished in 1928 - this is represented by the portico which resides on Johnston Green. The Portico was the front entrance to the F.W. Stone Farmhouse which was part of old Johnston Hall. During the Second World War, both Johnston Hall and Johnston Green served as headquarters for the Royal Canadian Air Force. Today, Johnston Hall is a symbol and landmark of the agricultural college and the University of Guelph.

== Residence information ==
Johnston Hall serves many purposes for the University of Guelph; however, it is primarily used as a medium-sized residence hall. It accommodates 315 students, who live on the top three floors of the building. Johnston Hall is known for its traditional architecture, and its spacious tower lounge makes it a favourite among students. In fact, the university receives thousands of applications, with students making Johnston Hall their first choice, but only 315 get in. The process works on a lottery basis, and each student has an equal advantage as long as they have applied before the deadline set by the University of Guelph.

This is the famous Clock Tower of Johnston Hall

=== Academically enriched environment ===
Johnston Hall acts as an academically enriched environment through the assignment of academic clusters. That is, students in similar programs are grouped together. This allows students to share classes, living space and friendships in order to help new students adjust to the challenges of university life. This is extremely helpful as the majority of occupants are first-year students, who have little to no experience living independently or with other students.

Johnston Hall is supported by a team of Residence Life Staff (RLS). The RLS consists of a community assistant, eight residence assistants, who are spread out strategically to oversee particular sections of all three floors, and five cluster leaders to assist with academic-related activities. Johnston Hall is one of the only residence buildings without cable in individual dorm rooms. However, there are television sets in the common areas that are accessible at all times.

=== Design of Johnston Hall ===
The building is designed with rooms running off both sides of the corridor on each floor. Rooms are primarily doubles or triples, with the exception of a few singles on each floor. In addition, the rooms are laid out to have male and female designated rooms side by side. Although Johnston Hall is a co-ed residence, it does not have co-ed rooms (where males and females share the same room). Additionally, the rooms are set up by degree program. Each year, administration attempts to position all science students or business students on one floor, or at least in one entire section of a floor, depending on the variability of programs. This is done to facilitate team-building and to encourage students to work together on related academic activities.

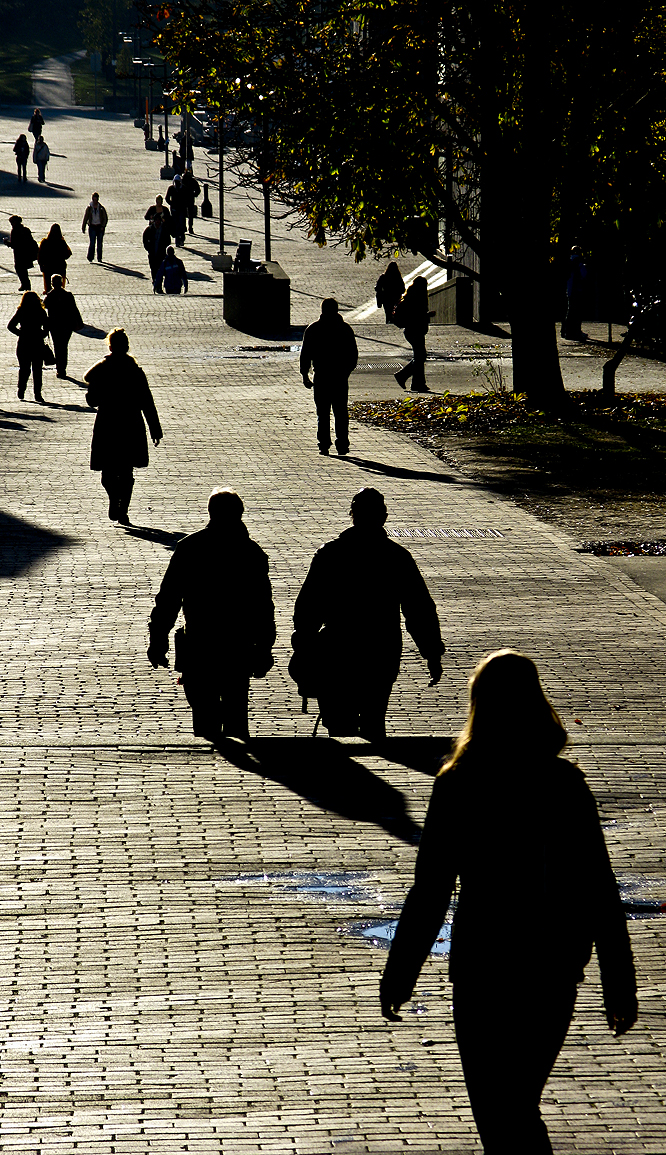
This is Winegard Walk, right between Johnston Hall and Johnston Green, where thousands of students walk each day

The building has two large separate male and female washrooms on each floor and a small kitchenette/study lounge. The lounge includes such items as a microwave, sink, cabinets, and study cubicles, as well as a dining room table. All rooms are equipped with twin-sized single mattresses and large dressers, bookshelves, and a wooden desk with a lamp. Some of the triple rooms contain new furniture including bunk beds, smaller but more spacious desks and cabinets. Outside of the rooms, the residence has areas for recreation and student entertainment. The most popular area, known as the "Tower Lounge", allows for large-scale activities to take place, such as billiards, ping pong, cooking, television set with couches, meeting areas, study tables, and vending machines. The residence has laundry facilities, fully equipped with washers and dryers, which are card operated. For students with music interests, there is a piano room available located on the fourth floor, in the North wing.

=== Security and accessibility ===
Johnston Hall is one of the only residences at the University of Guelph with cameras in all hallways. These cameras are 360-degree cameras that are installed into the ceiling panels, usually 2-3 cameras per straight hallway. The cameras are not monitored on a 24-hour basis, but used as a precautionary measure in case an incident does occur. However, Johnston Hall is locked on a 24-hour basis, and residents need to scan their student ID card to enter the building, and use a personal key to enter their residence room and mailbox. In terms of accessibility, Johnston Hall is a handicap friendly building, which is serviced by one elevator that can only be used by occupants with a designated key. Otherwise, most students use the wide staircases located in nearly every hallway.

== Co-op bookstore ==
The OAC Students' Co-op, now called the University of Guelph Campus Co-op was established on November 26, 1913, by seven students from Guelph and Wellington County. It was established to provide a cost-effective and structured business on-campus that would sell students their textbooks and supplies. As the only other bookstore was downtown, the Co-op provided a convenient and valuable service.

The co-op bookstore is democratically owned and controlled by students, and operates out of the basement of Johnston Hall on the University of Guelph campus. Membership is available to all students at the cost of $10 and is valid for one year. Becoming a member of the bookstore, students are eligible for 5 percent discounts on all new purchases. Through these memberships, the Guelph Campus co-op rebated over $120,000 to its members. The bookstore is a non-share consumer co-operative that is governed by the Co-operative Corporations Act of Ontario and the GCC Bylaws.

The co-op bookstore runs various programs, including one of its major "textbook buy backs", at the end of every semester. Tables, and pricing guides are positioned around the university where students can come and have their books appraised, and bought back. The co-op gives students cash back for all of their books. Most of the time, the books are bought back at a fraction of the price they were sold. In fact, some books, which have newer editions may not even be purchased back.

The co-op's main competitor is the University Bookstore, created and operated by the University of Guelph. This bookstore is much bigger and has a larger variety of products. It is run by University of Guelph staff, and not owned by students. In addition, it does not offer students the opportunity to become members and receive discounts. However, the prices for books are very similar and if one bookstore does not have the book in stock, they will recommend trying the other. In addition, an indirect competitor is TheCannon, an online posting site where students can sell their textbook to their peers. This site has become favoured because textbooks can be bought and sold for fair prices.

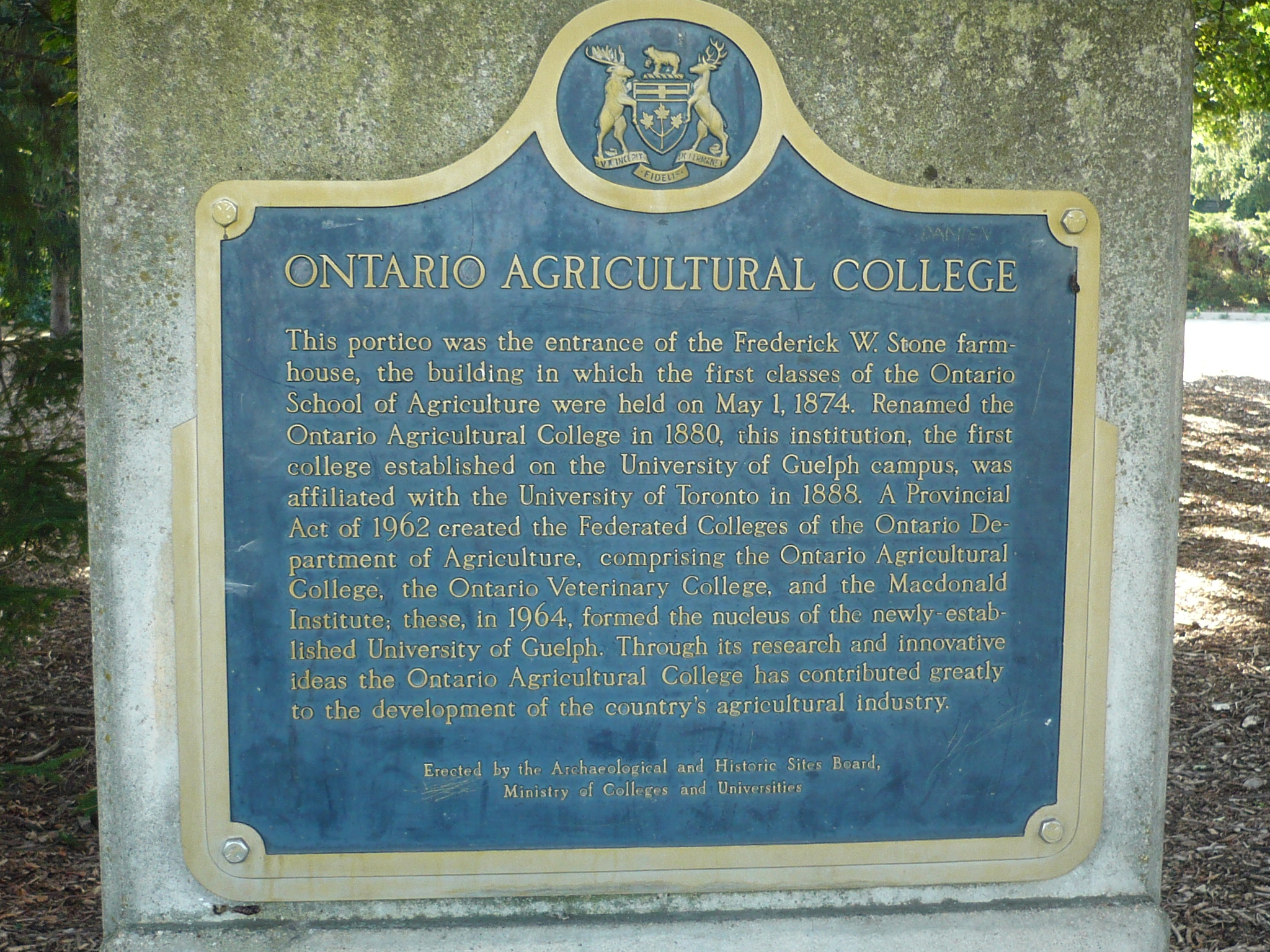
This is a photograph of the plaque recognizing the Portico and the OAC (click on picture to enlarge and read declaration)

== School of Continuing Studies ==
Each year the School of Continuing Studies (formerly Open Learning & Educational Support) and its partners offer more than 235 learning opportunities while serving more than 19,000 registrations from around the world. The School of Continuing Studies currently has 56 staff members. The Office of Open Learning is one of the units that occupy a portion of Johnston Hall. They occupy the north wing on the main floor and a large portion of the south wing in the basement. The university's Distance Education (DE) courses are offered by various academic departments in partnership with their office. The School of Continuing Studies provides the administrative and technical support involved in taking on a DE course. In addition to DE courses, continuing education courses and full programs are administered by the School of Continuing Studies.

In summary, the School of Continuing Studies has three main areas of responsibility:

- Distance Education - DE (undergraduate & graduate credit courses)
- Continuing Education (courses and programs offered both on-campus and in online format). One specific example includes the English as a Second language program which is held on campus.
- Open Learning program (this program enables students who are not currently registered in a degree program at the U of G, access to degree credit courses. Credits obtained through the Open Learning program can be banked for eventual application to a degree program at U of G or another university. Students wanting to take a U of G DE course on a letter of permission from another university can take courses through the open learning program. In the summer, the Office of Open Learning receives many letters of permission from students coming from other universities in Canada wishing to take a course or two.

The Open Learning program (i.e. the offering of degree credit courses to those not currently enrolled in degree credit programs at Guelph) was approved by University of Guelph Senate on June 21, 1994. The School of Continuing Studies was formerly known as the Open Learning & Educational Support (OpenEd) department, which formed out of the previous Office of Open Learning. The Office of Open Learning was formed when the Distance Education Division and the Office of Continuing Education merged; this was approved by the University Senate on January 17, 1995. The Office of Continuing Education has roots dating back to the 1960s.

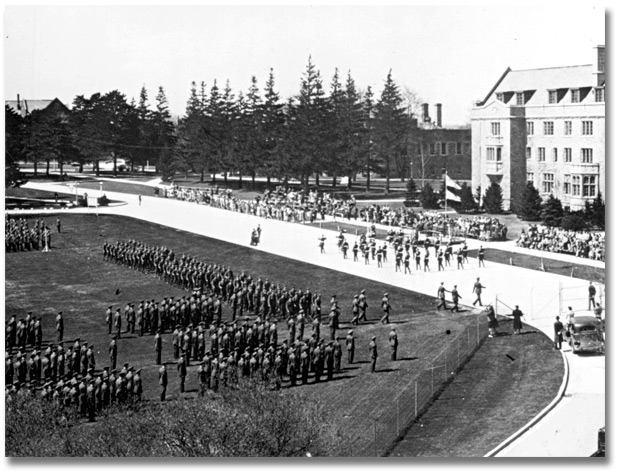
This is a picture taken in the 1930s of the Canadian Forces training on Johnston Green, right in front of Johnston Hall, the old building

== Ontario Agricultural College ==
The Ontario Agricultural College (OAC) first began its operations in Moreton Lodge, where Johnston Hall stands today. Ever since Johnston Hall was built in late 1931, the OAC has occupied the basement and first floor of the building. The OAC has its own offices, storage rooms, dining and conference facilities as well as small lecture rooms for OAC classes within Johnston Hall. Although the OAC was established in 1874, it would later become one of three founding colleges of the University of Guelph in 1964. Prior to this, the college was an associate agricultural college of the University of Toronto. Today the college has four campuses in Alfred, Guelph, Kemptville, and Ridgetown, Ontario, Canada with over 3000 students enrolled.

OAC includes the Faculty of Environmental Sciences, which is a leading facility in environmental education and research across the University of Guelph. In addition, there are many environmental courses offered by faculty from OAC, available to all University of Guelph students. This Faculty was permanently relocated to the OAC in 2006, and began its operation in Johnston Hall. In 2009, the School of Environmental Sciences was formed by a merger of the departments of Environmental Biology and Land Resource Sciences, and the Faculty of Environmental Sciences, creating a large body that would operate out of Johnston Hall.

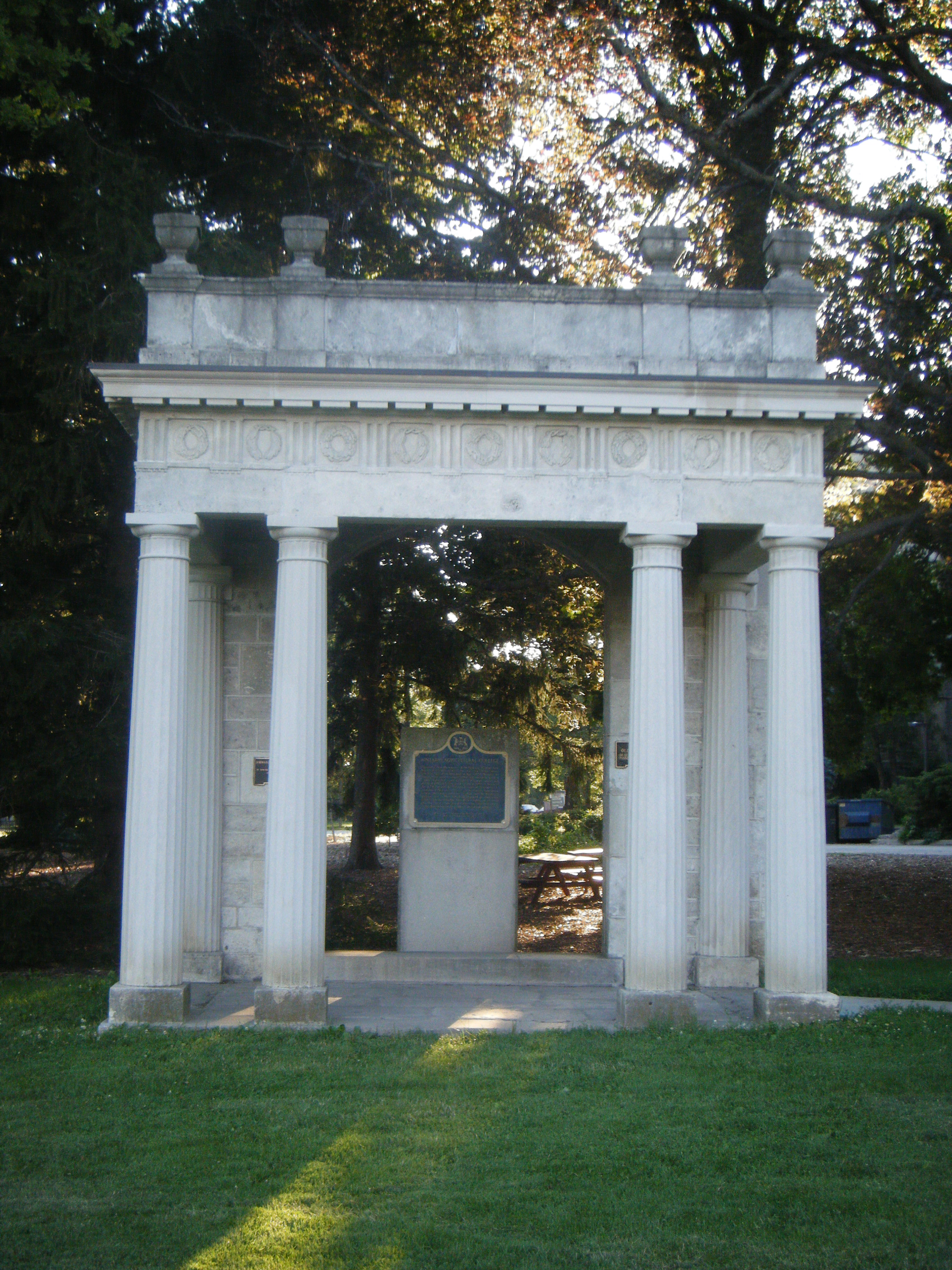
This is a photo of the Portico, the entrance to the old Johnston Hall that stood prior to 1931 that was preserved when the building was torn down. It now sits on Johnston Green

.

== Johnston Green ==
Johnston Hall overlooks one of the most popular hangout spots on the campus of the University of Guelph, Johnston Green. At any time of day or year, students can be seen playing recreational sports such as frisbee and football; it's also where the Orientation week concerts and dances are held. Johnston Green is not only a place for students and peers to relax but also functions as a shortcut to many buildings on campus such as War Memorial Hall, Massey Hall and more.

Johnston Green is a place where people get together, but it also holds some of the university's historical landmarks. Old Jeremiah, or the cannon as we know it today, was once situated on Johnston Green during the 1970s but has since been moved back to its original location, closer to the University Centre, where it sits today in the middle of Winegard Walk. Another landmark that sits on Johnston Green is The Portico. The Portico has been around since 1874 when the first students walked through it as it was the door to the house of Frederick W. Stone. Eventually the university purchased the building to use it as a lecture hall and a residence building. The building was torn down to make way for Johnston Hall, and The Portico was saved and moved onto Johnston Green as a commemorative item Guelph alumni certainly enjoy the sentimentality of The Portico. This landmark is also a popular place for students to take their graduation photos.

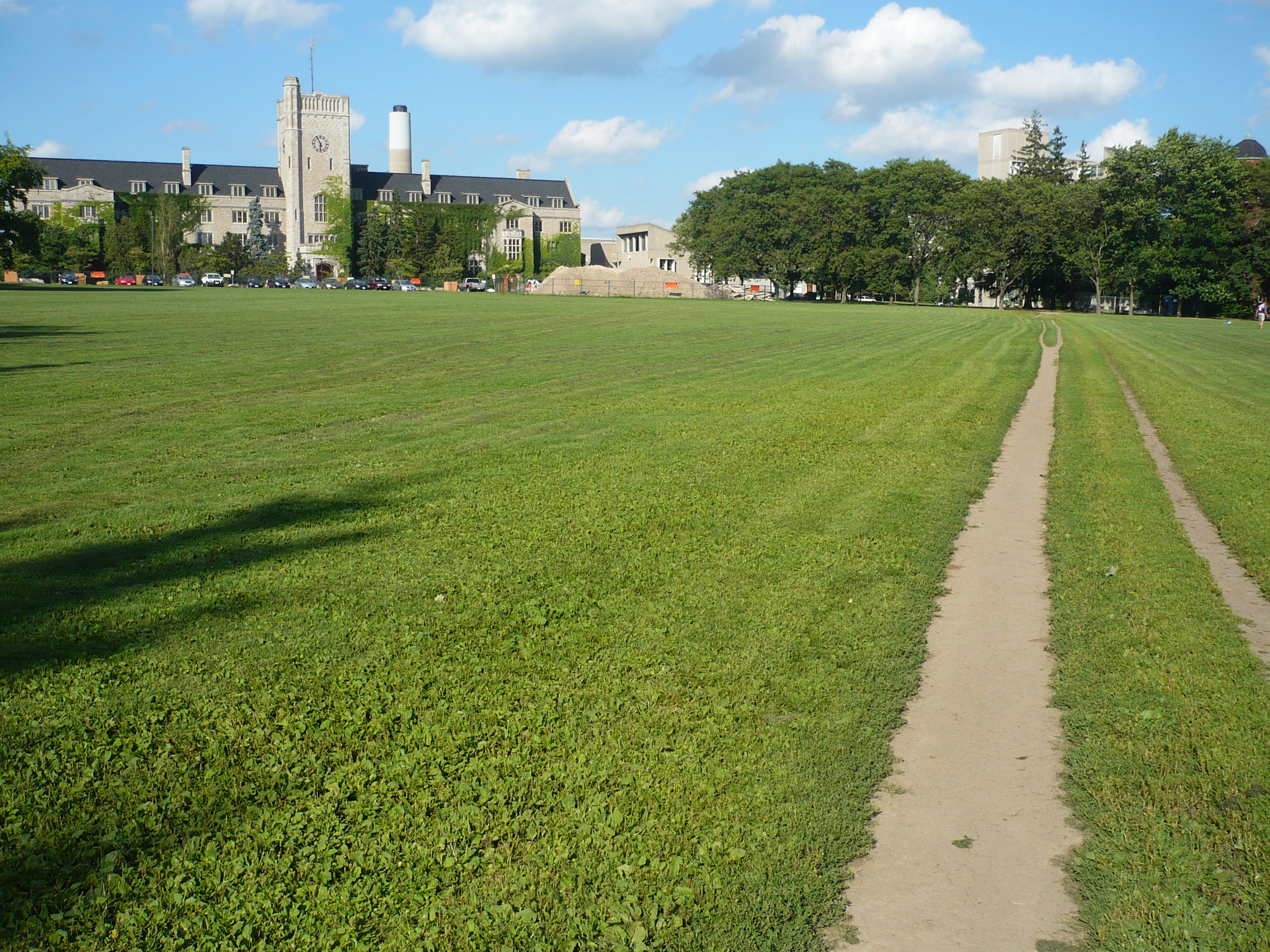
This is a photograph of Johnston Green, a large grassy area in front of Johnston Hall

=== Winegard Walk ===
Winegard Walk is one of the primary unifying walkways on the University of Guelph's campus. Winegard runs north and west along Macdonald Street and south and west along South Ring Road and the intersection of Stone Road and Gordon Street. Johnston Hall's building frontage opens up onto the midpoint of Winegard Walk with Johnston Green also framing the walkway across from Johnston Hall.
