= David Shoalts =

Canadian sports reporter and columnist

- Born: 7 February 1955 (age 71); Wainfleet, Ontario, Canada
- Education: University of Waterloo; Conestoga College
- Notable work: Greed and Glory: The Fall of Hockey Czar Alan Eagleson; Hockey Fight in Canada: The Big Media Faceoff Over the NHL
- Spouse: Yvonne (married)
- Awards: Outstanding Sportswriting Award (2009)

David Shoalts (born 7 February 1955) is a Canadian sports reporter and former columnist for The Globe and Mail.

A graduate from Conestoga College, Shoalts has also worked for the Calgary Herald and Toronto Sun. In 2009, Shoalts and journalist Paul Waldie were awarded the Outstanding Sportswriting Award by Sports Media Canada for their coverage of the Phoenix Coyotes.

== Early life and education ==
Shoalts was born in Wainfleet, Ontario. He stated that while his father, uncle, and brother were in the construction business, he took after his mother who wrote a gardening column. He graduated from Pelham Secondary School in 1973 and attended the University of Waterloo before transferring to the journalism department at Conestoga College. Shoalts stated he did not take his education seriously until after his first year at the University of Waterloo, when he decided he wanted to pursue journalism as a career. While at Conestoga College, he wrote for the student newspaper, Spoke.

== Career ==
After graduating from Conestoga College, Shoalts earned an internship at The Kitchener-Waterloo Record, where he covered the Canadian Football League (CFL). From there he was hired at the Calgary Herald in 1979.

In 1983, Shoalts was hired by the Toronto Sun as a copyeditor. In 1984, Shoalts was hired by The Globe and Mail to work on page layout and design, although he eventually earned a writing position. In 1986, Shoalts covered the CFL and worked in the Globe's news department in 1991 before returning to sports and hockey. While working for the Globe in 1993, Shoalts and William Houston published a book titled Greed and Glory: The Fall of Hockey Czar Alan Eagleson which detailed Alan Eagleson's legal battle.

While working for The Globe and Mail from Boston in 2007, Shoalts wrote a book titled Tales From The Toronto Maple Leafs which included anecdotes from various Toronto Maple Leafs personnel about the history of the hockey team. In 2009, Shoalts and journalist Paul Waldie won the Outstanding Sportswriting Award from Sports Media Canada for their coverage of the Phoenix Coyotes. In 2010, Conestoga College awarded him the Alumni of Distinction Award for Media and Design.

In 2018, Shoalts published a book titled Hockey Fight in Canada: The Big Media Faceoff Over the NHL which described the NHL ending their deal with CBC and signing with Rogers.

== Publications ==
The following is a list of major publications:

- Greed and Glory: The Fall of Hockey Czar Alan Eagleson (1993)
- Tales from the Toronto Maple Leafs (2007)
- Tales from the Toronto Maple Leafs Locker Room: A Collection of the Greatest Maple Leafs Stories Ever Told (2012)
- Hockey Fight in Canada: The Big Media Faceoff Over the NHL (2018)

== Personal life ==
Shoalts and his wife Yvonne had two children together, however his son died in 2012.

In 2016, Shoalts began performing stand-up comedy in comedy clubs.
