= CJIQ-FM =

Radio station in Kitchener, Ontario

Coordinates: 43°15′39″N 80°26′38″W

- Kitchener, Ontario; Canada
- Broadcast area: Waterloo Region
- Frequency: 88.3 MHz
- Branding: CJIQ 88.3

Programming
- Format: Campus - Alternative Rock

Ownership
- Owner: Conestoga College

History
- First air date: January 8, 2001

Technical information
- Class: B
- ERP: 3,020 watts (8,220 watts maximum)
- HAAT: 249 metres (817 ft)

Links
- Website: cjiqfm.com

CJIQ-FM (88.3 MHz) is a non-commercial Canadian radio station in Kitchener, Ontario, serving the tri-cities of Kitchener, Cambridge and Waterloo. It is the campus radio station of Conestoga College and it airs an alternative rock format with other genres of music heard on weekends. The station is run and staffed by the students of the Broadcast Radio and Journalism programs at the Doon campus.

CJIQ broadcasts with an effective radiated power (ERP) of 3,020 watts (8,220 watts maximum). Its transmitter is atop the CIII-TV Global tower in Ayr. CJIQ can also be heard on Rogers Digital Cable 947.

== History ==
The station was granted an instructional license from the Canadian Radio-television and Telecommunications Commission in July of 1999, and signed on for testing in November 2000.

When It officially launched on January 8, 2001 the station was originally called “The Condor” named after the school’s mascot. It aired a hot adult contemporary and contemporary hit radio format. That was later changed to alternative rock.
