= UTM Eagles =

Intramural athletics teams of the University of Toronto Mississauga

- College: University of Toronto Mississauga
- Nickname: Eagles
- Affiliation: Ontario Collegiate Recreation
- Athletic director: Peter Mumford
- Location: Mississauga, Ontario
- Arena: Recreation, Athletics and Wellness Centre
- Other venues: South Field
- Colours: Navy blue, white, and silver
- Mascot: Rocky the Eagle
- Website: utmeagles.ca
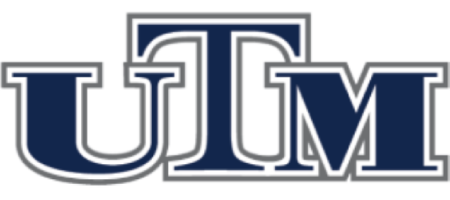

The UTM Eagles are the intramural and extramural athletic teams that represent the University of Toronto Mississauga (UTM). Its teams compete in Ontario Collegiate Recreation (OCR) extramurals organized by the Ontario Colleges Athletic Association (OCAA) and in University of Toronto Intramurals, including the Tri-Campus League.

UTM has been an associate member of the OCAA since 1993, and had its own varsity sports franchise in the Canadian Collegiate Athletic Association from 2014 to 2021. The main varsity sports program for UTM students is the Toronto Varsity Blues, organized by the Faculty of Kinesiology and Physical Education on the St. George campus.

== Sports sponsored ==
=== University of Toronto Tri-Campus League ===
The Eagles represent the Mississauga campus in the University of Toronto Tri-Campus League, the highest level in U of T Intramurals for athletes to compete at a level below the Varsity Blues, the university-wide intercollegiate teams. In Tri-Campus sports, teams represent their home campus and face those from the other U of T campuses.

Men's sports	Women's sports
Ice hockey	Ice hockey
Basketball	Basketball
Indoor soccer	Indoor soccer
Outdoor soccer	Outdoor soccer
Volleyball	Volleyball
Co-ed sports
Ultimate frisbee

=== Ontario Collegiate Recreation ===
The UTM Eagles have been an associate member of the extramural Ontario Collegiate Recreation (OCR) program since 1993, when the campus was then known as Erindale College. U of T Mississauga has hosted OCAA tournaments since the mid-2000s, and competes in OCR extramural games including basketball, soccer, and cricket. In April 2025, the Eagles competed in the OCR's first ever women’s cricket tournament, hosted at Conestoga College.

== History ==
The Department of Athletics at Erindale College was established in 1967 alongside the Erindale College Athletic and Recreation Association (ECARA). The college's first indoor facility was made from a converted four car garage, while athletics spaces at Erindale Secondary School and Huron Park Recreation Centre were used for the expanding program. Erindale College teams played in the University of Toronto's Interfaculty sports (now known as U of T Intramurals) under the name Erindale Wendigoes, later changed to the Erindale Warriors for men's teams and Erindale Hustlers for women's teams. In the 1970s, the college attempted to establish its own intercollegiate program, with a petition signed by 1,700 students to allow it to compete in the Ontario University Athletics (OUA) basketball league. The request was denied, but Erindale continued to play in exhibition games, while its rowing team was its only intercollegiate sport.

The campus joined Ontario Collegiate Recreation (OCR) in 1993. In 1999, the teams' eagle logo was created by student Nejatie Bahroz, and the UTM Eagles colours of navy blue, white and silver replaced the former Kelly green, white and black. The opening of the Recreation, Athletics and Wellness Centre (RAWC) in 2006 greatly expanded indoor athletics space on the campus.

The University of Toronto Mississauga became the 30th full member of the Ontario Colleges Athletic Association (OCAA) on April 28, 2014. It joined other smaller university campuses such as Laurier Brantford and the Lakehead University Orillia Campus in the College Association rather than OUA. Under the direction of Ken Duncliffe, head of the campus's athletics department (now known as the Department of Recreation, Athletics and Wellness), the Eagles varsity program was created to give UTM students an option to participate in varsity sports at a lower level than the Varsity Blues. The Blues, which participate in Ontario University Athletics (OUA), are based on the larger St. George campus and serve as the primary intercollegiate sports program available to students from all three University of Toronto campuses.

The UTM Eagles varsity program consisted of six teams: women's basketball, men's basketball, women's soccer, men's soccer, badminton, and cross country. Basketball games were held in the Recreation, Athletics and Wellness Centre (RAWC) and soccer on the South Athletic Field.

In 2020 during the COVID-19 pandemic the OCAA temporarily ceased operations, and a year later in November 2021, the athletics department announced the unexpected suspension of the Eagles varsity sports program, citing low participation numbers. This decision was met with resistance from students, who created a change.org petition and social media campaign to reinstate the program. The varsity program remains suspended, with the University of Toronto recommending that Mississauga students participate in sports through the Tri-Campus League or the Varsity Blues.

=== Former varsity sports ===
Men's sports	Women's sports
Basketball	Basketball
Soccer	Soccer
Co-ed sports
Badminton
Cross country
