= Ontario Colleges Athletic Association =

Governing body for college sport in Ontario

- Association: CCAA
- No. of teams: 26
- Headquarters: Toronto, Ontario
- Region: Ontario
- Website: www.ocaa.com

The Ontario Colleges Athletic Association (OCAA) is the governing body of all competitive college sports in the Canadian province of Ontario. The OCAA is a part of the Canadian Colleges Athletic Association (CCAA). The OCAA, with Ontario University Athletics, governs post-secondary school educational sports in Ontario.

== History ==
Founded on June 9, 1967, as a result of an increasing need expressed by several institutions in the province to develop sport, fitness and recreational opportunities at the college level, the Association was founded by members of seven institutions across the province: Algonquin College, Centennial College, Fanshawe College, George Brown College, Mohawk College, Northern College and St. Clair College. Forty-eight teams competed in the eight OCAA sanctioned sports. Ten more colleges joined the fold in 1968 and by 1971 the OCAA was an athletic conference with 30 members. The largest percentage of growth in participation occurred in 1982-83 when the Association initiated a tiered system in some of its league sports. This system enabled colleges to participate and develop in the league structure.

1971 also brought about the beginning of inter-provincial competitions, with Ontario and Quebec playing off in seven sports. The following year, East met West and the Canadian Colleges Athletic Association (CCAA) was founded.

As the OCAA continued to grow and develop, the administration for the Association also experienced change. In the early years, an executive committee directed the affairs with the first members of the OCAA's executive committee including Hal Wilson, President (Algonquin); Gord Smith, vice-president (Lambton); and Joe Marko, Secretary-Treasurer (Mohawk). The day-to-day affairs of the Association were managed by the Executive and 26 Senior and Junior Convenors.

Since then, the OCAA Executive has expanded to seven positions: President, Past President, 1st Vice President and four vice-presidents. Perhaps the most important development of the OCAA, from an administrative and program development perspective, was the hiring of an executive director in August 1976. This and the establishment of a Central Office, enabled the OCAA to professionalize its operations and give its members a focal point for continued growth.

As excellence became a more integral part of the OCAA mandate, initiatives such as the Media Guide & Directory, and the weekly Newsletter “The Record” gave member institutions a higher profile in the sport community and with the media.

In 1983, the OCAA hosted the National Championships in Toronto and North Bay where more than 700 athletes competed in six national championships events. Most observers agree that no other CCAA conference has come close to matching the hosting job Ontario did that year. The OCAA is still a member of the CCAA and remains active in hosting various national championships.

In May 1984, in response to the need of enhance women's programs offered in the OCAA, the Association, with Seneca's Bonnie Bacvar as chairperson, established the Women's Sport Development Committee. During its tenure, this committee undertook a number of innovative projects promoting OCAA women's sports to high school students and establishing an ongoing professional development seminar for administrators and coaches for women's athletic programs. In 1993-94 the committee was honoured with a national award from the CCAA in recognition of its leadership and innovation.

It has been a major boost to the OCAA that the Central Office is located in the Sport Alliance of Ontario (SAO) building (formerly the Ontario Sport & Recreation Centre) in Toronto since 1991 allowing the organization to be surrounded by numerous Provincial Sport Organizations (PSO's) which facilitates cooperative programming.

The OCAA's growth and development has not been limited solely to membership and varsity success. In an effort to increase activity and healthy living within the student population, the OCAA and the Ontario College Committee on Campus Recreation (OCCCR) developed the Active Living Challenge. This program was created to enable a greater portion of the student body to receive the health benefits which recreational and competitive activity can provide.

In 2009-2010 the OCAA's 30 members compete in 14 league (7) and tournament sports (7). In nine of these sports, the OCAA Champion go on to compete nationally within the CCAA.

A high standard of competition has already been achieved by Ontario college teams both at the Provincial and National levels. In 2008-09 OCAA institutions produced outstanding National Championship performances which included the Algonquin College Men's Soccer reaching their fifth consecutive national championship final and medal, including capturing the 2006-2007 National Championship title for the second time in six seasons and most recently a silver medal in 2008–09. Algonquin's program continued their national medal haul in both men's basketball and volleyball both capturing bronze.

The women were also successful on the national scene as OCAA Cross-Country runner Dawn Martin of St. Lawrence College - Brockville captured bronze in. In team competition, the Sheridan women's basketball team made history as the first OCAA team capturing the silver medal.

Other notable accomplishments in OCAA history include the Humber Hawks Men's Basketball team earning three consecutive National Championships (1990–93); the Seneca Scouts Women's Volleyball team capturing seven consecutive Provincial Championships (1989–96); the Sheridan Bruins Men's Volleyball team for their unprecedented six consecutive gold medals at the Ontario Championships (1988–94); and in 1996–97, Durham and Humber advancing to the first all-Ontario final at the National Men's Basketball Championship, a feat not repeated again until 2000-2001 when Humber and Sheridan met at Humber.

== Member institutions ==
=== League members ===
- Algonquin College Wolves
- Collège Boréal Vipères
- Cambrian College Golden Shield
- Canadore College Panthers
- Centennial College Colts
- La Cité collégiale Coyotes
- Conestoga College Condors
- Confederation College Thunder Hawks
- Durham College Lords
- Fanshawe College Falcons
- Fleming College Phoenix
- George Brown Polytechnic Huskies
- Georgian College Grizzlies
- Humber Polytechnic Hawks
- Lakehead University Orillia Thunderwolves
- Lambton College Lions
- Loyalist College Lancers
- Mohawk College Mountaineers
- Niagara College Knights
- Redeemer University Royals
- St. Clair College Saints
- St. Lawrence College Surge
- Sault College Cougars
- Seneca Polytechnic Sting
- Sheridan College Bruins
- Wilfrid Laurier University Brantford Golden Hawks

=== Associate members ===
- King's University College
- Ontario Tech University Ridgebacks
- Trent University Peterborough Excalibur
- University of Toronto Mississauga Eagles

== Sports ==
- Badminton – Men's and Women's
- Basketball – Men's and Women's
- Cross Country Running – Men's and Women's
- Curling – Men's, Women's and Mixed
- Fastball – Women's
- Golf – Men's and Women's
- Soccer – Men's and Women's
- Rugby – Men's (division 1 and 2) and Women's
- Volleyball – Men's and Women's
- Indoor Soccer – Men's and Women's
- Baseball – Men's

=== Ice hockey ===
Ice hockey was once a big sport in the OCAA. From 1967 until the 2000s, the sport was played as an intercollegiate sport, but in 2004 down to just three schools (St. Clair, Humber, Fleming), the league chose not to operate any longer. The Windsor St. Clair Saints operated for four more seasons, two touring to play American Colleges and two in the Ontario Hockey Association's Senior "AAA" Loop, Major League Hockey, in contention for the Allan Cup. The Saints folded in 2008. In 2009, the Nipissing Lakers joined the Ontario University Athletics Hockey League.

Most of these schools still operate intramural leagues and even varsity teams, but there is no formal league to play in. The former championship trophy resides at St. Clair College in Windsor, Ontario.

== OCAA Hall of Fame ==
The OCAA Hall of Fame was established in the year 2003 to honour the achievements of its former athletes, coaches and builders. On April 30, 2003, 265 people attended the inaugural induction ceremony in Toronto to pay tribute to the first 103 inductees, and celebrate the OCAA's rich history. In 2005, members of the OCAA gathered in Hamilton, Ontario to honour 30 new members inducted into the Hall of Fame and in 2007 another 37 new members were inducted at the ceremony in Oshawa. In 2009, the OCAA inducted 87 new members including members of the All-Millennium team's for Fastball, Soccer and Badminton in Windsor.

== See also ==
- Canadian Collegiate Athletic Association
