= Conestoga College =

Public college in Kitchener, Ontario, Canada

Coordinates: 43°23′13″N 80°24′41″W

Conestoga College Institute of Technology and Advanced Learning
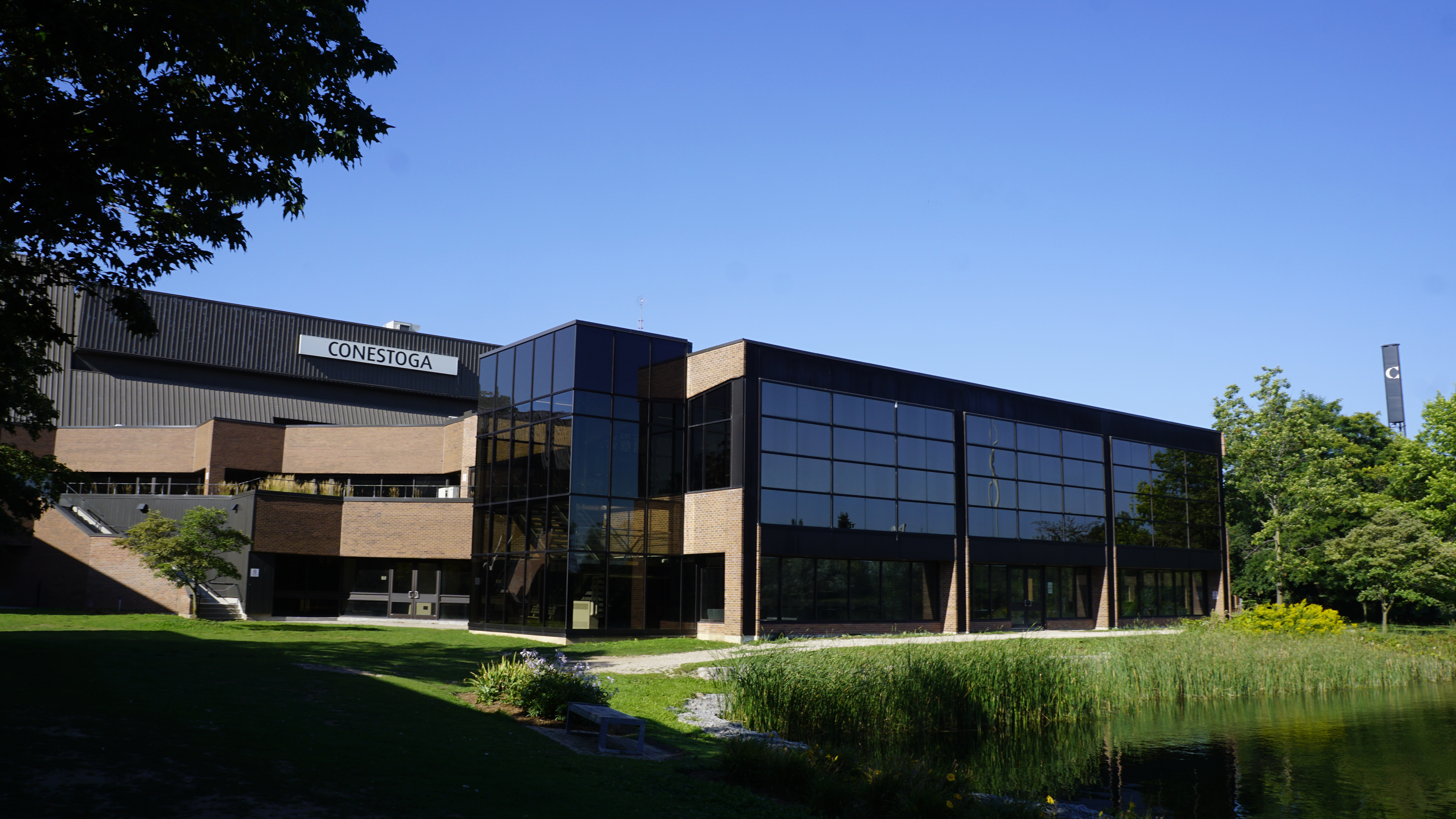
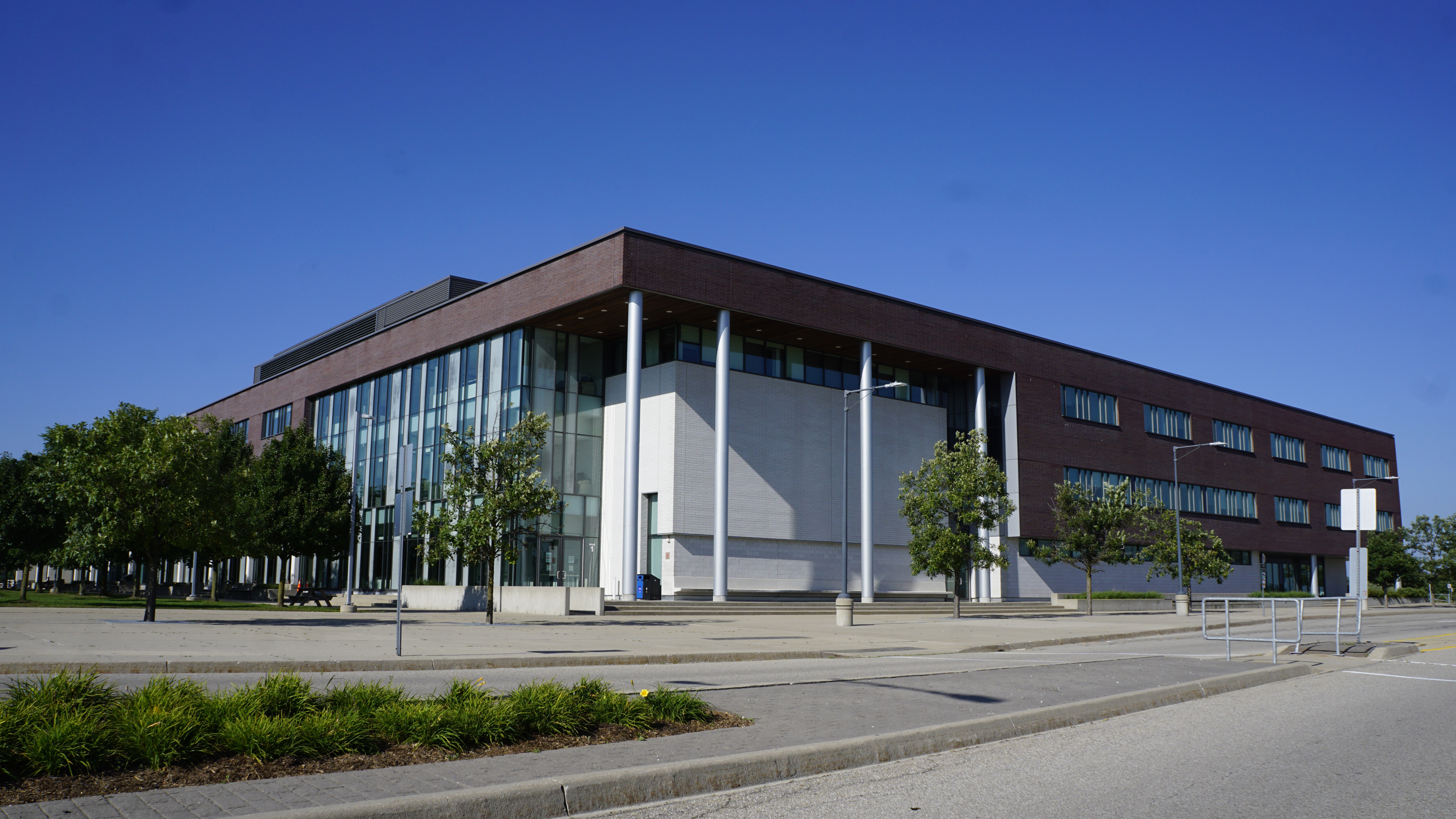
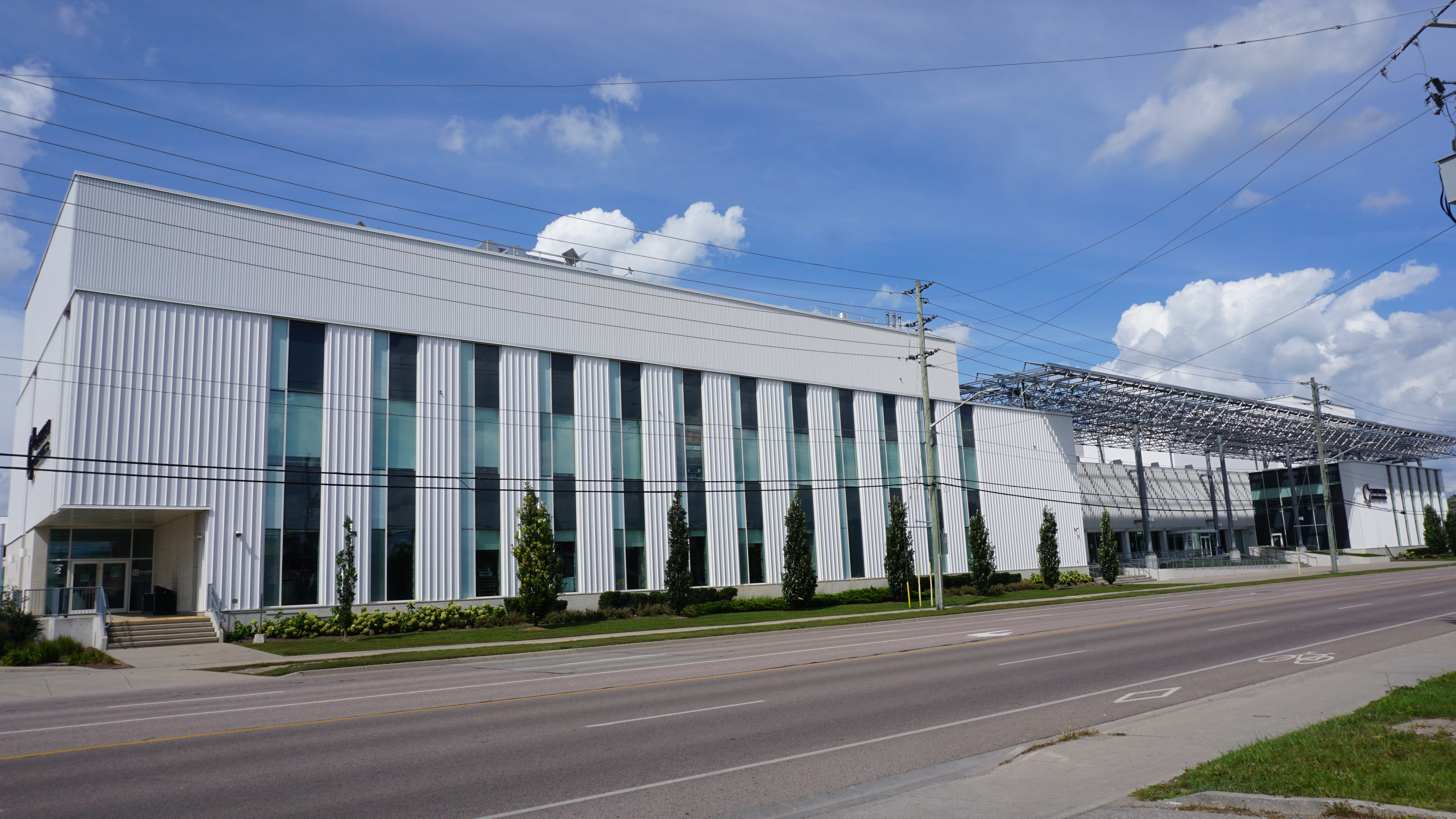
- Doon Campus Cambridge Campus Waterloo Campus
- Type: Public college
- Established: 1967
- Affiliations: CCAA, ACCC, AUCC, OCAA, CBIE, Polytechnics Canada
- President: Norma McDonald Ewing
- Vice-president: List of vice-presidents: Dean Bulloch; Michelle Chretien; Joorg Dallmeier; Carolyn Galvin; Gary Hallam; Eric Johnstone; Norman Macdonald-Ewing; Julia Oosterman; Connie Phelps; Sandra Schelling; Tim Schill; Trish Weigel-Green
- Students: 11,000 full-time; 30,000 part-time (2025: 10,553 FTEs)
- Location: Kitchener, Ontario, Canada
- Campus: Urban
- Sports teams: Conestoga Condors
- Colours: Navy and red
- Mascot: Condor
- Website: Official website

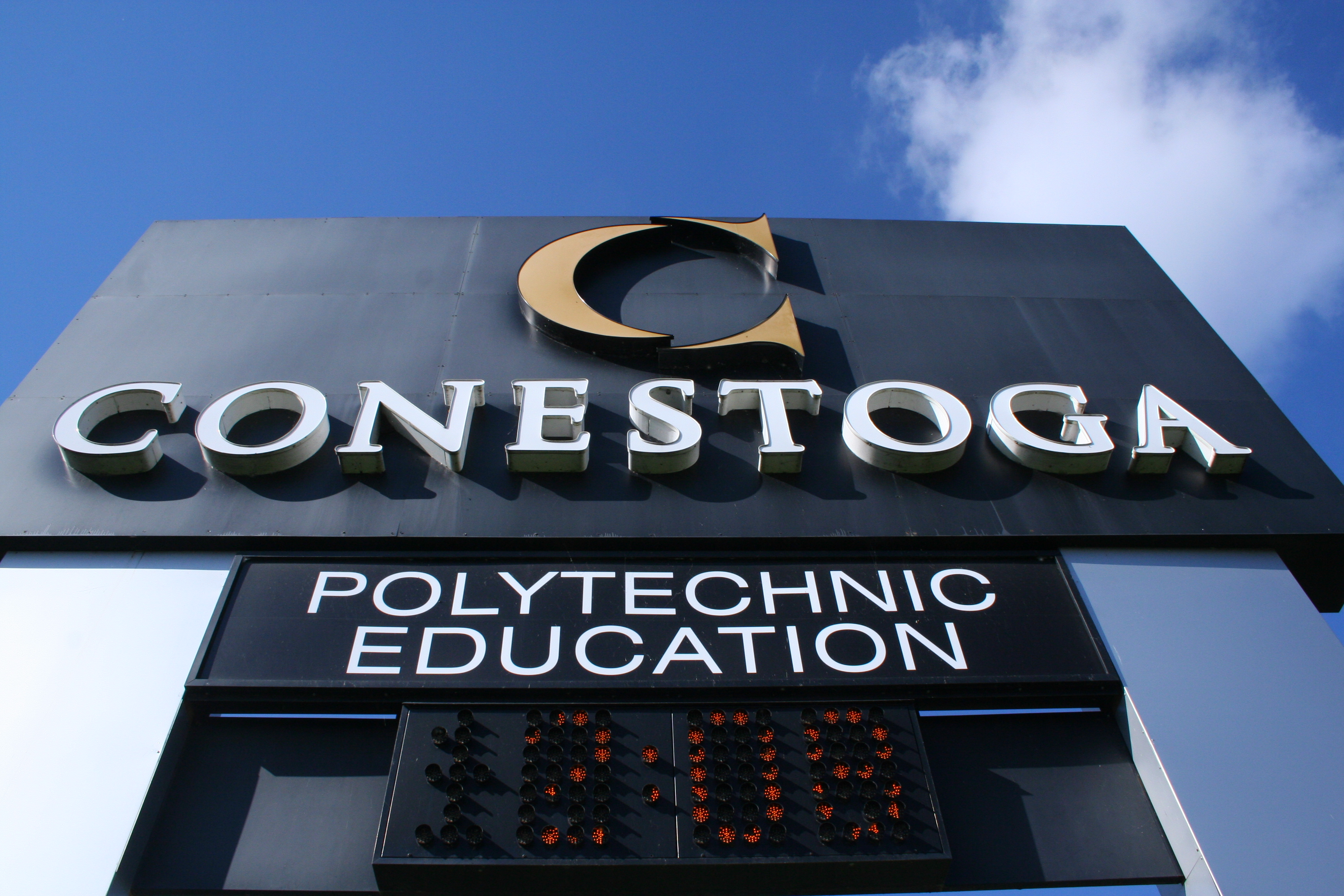
Doon Campus sign

Conestoga College Institute of Technology and Advanced Learning is a public college located in Kitchener, Ontario, Canada.

== History ==
In 1967, the college was founded as Conestoga College of Applied Arts and Technology by the government of Ontario to grant diplomas and certificates in career-related, skills-oriented programs.

The college started to offer degree programs in B.Eng. Mechanical Systems Engineering and B.A. Tech Architecture - Project and Facility Management starting in August 2003, and B.A. Tech in Integrated Telecommunication and Computer Technology in 2007.

== John Tibbits international student controversy ==
Corruption and the abandonment of academic ethics and standards to enroll foreign students was alleged in 2016. Conestoga faculty began reporting widespread cheating and fraud dating back to at least 2019. The early 2020s saw 70% to 81% of Conestoga's enrollees as international students, most commonly from India, and a 1,579% increase in international student population since 2014. Its total revenue increased over $137 million year over year.

By 2023, Conestoga College accounted for 30,395 international study permits, more than twice as many as any other post-secondary institution in Canada. In October federal Minister of Immigration Marc Miller threatened a federal crack down on Canadian post secondary institutions operating as "bad actors" if they did not clean up their act. President John Tibbits responded claiming Conestoga was "unfairly grouped" with "bad actors in the sector." In November Cambridge MP Bryan May publicly criticized Conestoga saying "They are exploiting these students." Reports of increased use of local food banks by Conestoga college and other students continued.

In January 2024, at a public event, Conestoga president John Tibbits called fellow Sault College president David Orazietti "a whore" in reference to enrolment practices. In February union locals called for Tibbits to resign. In March, Conestoga College was criticized by the Minister of Immigration over its practice of foreign enrolment. In April Orazietti filed a $200K defamation lawsuit against Conestoga and its president. Public criticism of Conestoga's business practices came also from their own staff. The following month Conestoga announced they were offering 160 employees early retirement in December 2024 in an effort to cut costs following decreased international student demand.

In March 2024, it was reported the college was expected to lose over half of its current international students. In April college staff, faculty and students went public with concerns citing a lack of fundamental skills among those admitted and students who struggle to make ends meet while the college posted a surplus of over $100 million in 2022–23. In August 2024 Conestoga defended running a 2023-24 surplus of over a quarter billion dollars. Prime Minister Justin Trudeau criticized colleges of profiting from high enrolment of foreign students in November, Conestoga declined to respond to his comments. Immigration Minister Marc Miller called out Conestoga saying that making $100 million surplus "isn't the vocation of a college". In December it was reported that 550 Conestoga students had made asylum claims. Canadian colleges working with recruiting entities in India processing tens of thousands of student visas have been implicated in human trafficking by Indian authorities. Conestoga paid $20 million in commissions to international recruitment agencies in 2019–20.

2025 marked a decline in enrolment leading to an announcement of significant staff layoffs. On the same day these layoffs were announced, a 30% salary increase to nearly $640,000 for president John Tibbets was announced. Further layoffs were announced during orientation week, as well as last minute program cuts.

John Tibbits announced his retirement on 14 January 2026.

In May 2026, the Ontario government college removed the college's board of governors, replacing it with a single administrator, Linda Franklin, a former CEO of Colleges Ontario.

In July 2026, the college's reported a $32.8 million operating deficit for the financial year ending March 31, 2026 as tuition revenue fell by 57%. The two prior years had seen surpluses of $121 and $252 million.

== Academic program ==
Conestoga has one, two, three, or four-year programs, as well as apprenticeship training programs. There are also many options available to students including four-year degrees in Mechanical Systems Engineering, Integrated Telecommunications and Computer Technology, Architecture, Health Informatics or the International Business Management degree which started in the fall of 2006. Conestoga staff and local politicians have been critical of international student enrolment in business programs.

=== Trades and apprenticeship ===
The college operates trades programs at the campuses in Kitchener, Waterloo, Cambridge and Guelph; training facilities are operated in Brantford and Ingersoll. The school's programs include Construction, Motive Power, Industrial and Service sectors, as well as Traditional Apprenticeship and, most recently, Pre-apprenticeship, offered in partnership with private enterprise companies. The college's president revealed a plan in late 2019 to consolidate all of the trades programs at one location in future, but the date of the move was not disclosed at that time.

=== UArctic ===
Conestoga college is an active member of the University of the Arctic. UArctic is an international cooperative network based in the Circumpolar Arctic region, consisting of more than 200 universities, colleges, and other organizations with an interest in promoting education and research in the Arctic region.

The college participates in UArctic's mobility program north2north. The aim of that program is to enable students of member institutions to study in different parts of the North.

== Campuses ==
Doon Campus is the main campus for Conestoga College. It is located at the south end of Kitchener and houses the central administration offices as well as the majority of courses offered by the college. Regional campuses have select programs.

1. Brantford: 274 Colborne St.
2. Cambridge: 850 Fountain St. South, 25 Reuter Drive
3. Guelph: 460 Speedvale Ave. West
4. Ingersoll: 420 Thomas St.
5. Kitchener: 299 Doon Valley Drive (Doon Campus), 49 Frederick St. (downtown)
6. Milton: 8160 Parkhill Dr., 433 Steeles Ave. East
7. Stratford: 130 Youngs St.
8. Waterloo: 108 University Av. East

=== Planned Milton Campus ===
The town of Milton and Wilfrid Laurier University had been working together since 2008 to develop the 61-hectare (150-acre) campus in Milton within the planned Milton Education Village (MEV) on 61 hectares (150 acres) of land donated by the town. The university subsequently partnered with Conestoga College which would also add a satellite campus at that location.

In April 2018, the Province announced a funding plan of $90 million for the project. Construction of the 61-hectare (150-acre) campus was expected to conclude in Q3 of 2021; in the meantime, the college would offer courses in rented premises, commencing in September 2019.

In October 2018, however, the new provincial government (elected in June 2018) withdrew the funding before any construction had begun, citing a greater than expected provincial deficit. This effectively cancelled the plans for the joint project with Laurier. Mayor Gord Krantz said the town would explore alternatives for funding the Milton Education Village campus. A news release issued by the college said that it would continue working with Laurier, "the government, industry and community partners to develop a revised model for the cost-effective delivery of post-secondary education ... in Milton..."

=== Cambridge expansion ===
The college decided to purchase 17 hectares (42 acres) of land in this city in 2019, to relocate all of the trades programs (offered at various campuses) to Cambridge at a future date. Specifics were not immediately provided at the time of the announcement in late 2019. The new campus opened in Fall 2022 on 16 hectares (40 acres) of land at Reuter Drive, next to Highway 401. The college aims to modernize and consolidate all skilled trades programs in this single location.

=== Planned Guelph expansion ===
The college has operated a small campus in Guelph for some years, but in late 2019, it advised the news media that a major expansion was planned after the trades program was relocated to Cambridge. "Within five or six years, we will have at least 5,000 students there ... [with] full-service programming," said college President John Tibbits. At the time, the Guelph campus had approximately 1,000 students.

In 2023, the college announced it would be purchasing a soon-to-be vacant building in downtown Guelph, with the first phase of a new campus scheduled to open in 2025. At full capacity, the new downtown Guelph campus will have approximately 5,000 students.

=== Other buildings ===
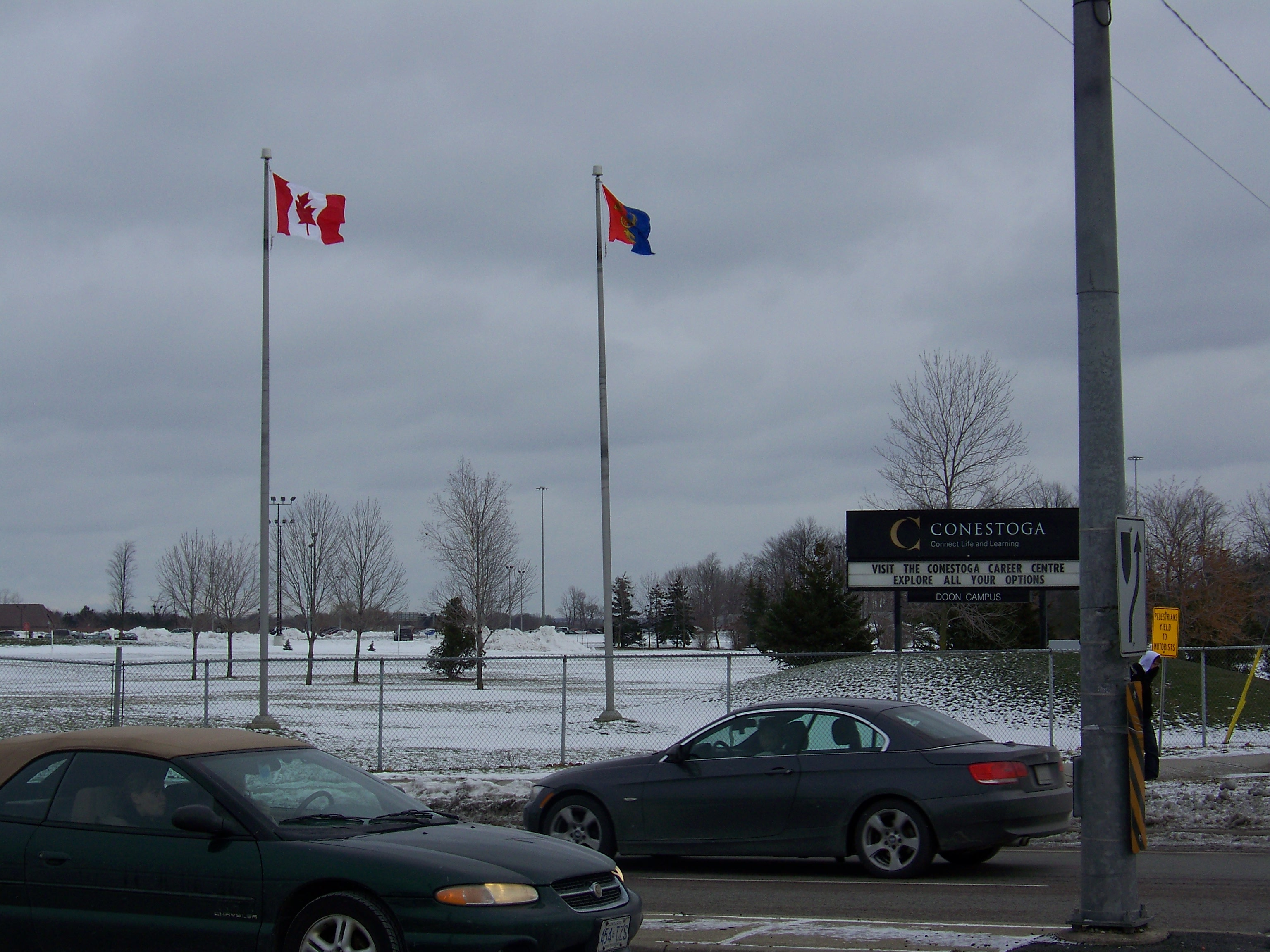
Doon Campus from Homer Watson Blvd.

- Recreation Centre
- ATS Centre
- Woodworking Centre of Ontario

=== Future ===
In 2011, the School of Engineering and Information Technology was relocated to a new expansion of the Doon campus opposite the current facility across Highway 401. This City of Cambridge site will eventually hold 93,000 square metres (1,000,000 sq ft) of space.

Phase one of the new Cambridge Campus was finished and open for the start of the fall 2011 semester. 24,000-square-metre (260,000 sq ft) building is home to the School of Engineering and Information Technology, as well as to the Institute for Food Processing Technology. The Engineering facility has programs with a focus on advanced manufacturing, robotics, renewable energy, telecommunications, and information technology. The expansion has increased capacity by 2,350 additional full-time spaces and allowed for an additional 800 new spaces for apprentices.

In May 2019, a new downtown campus for the International Business program was announced to be opening at Kitchener's Market Square in January 2020. It will host 1,000 students to start.

== Residences ==
Conestoga's Kitchener - Conestoga College Blvd. residence is close to the Kitchener - Doon and Cambridge - Fountain Street campuses. Scheduled to open in fall 2023, the Waterloo - University Ave. residence is close to the Waterloo campus and a short drive to the Kitchener - Downtown campus. Despite the international student body at Conestoga College increasing by 1579%, on-campus student housing does not meet the demand of enrolled students resulting in many students struggling to find housing in the region.

== Student Life Centre ==
=== Student media ===
- 88.3 CJIQ is the college's campus radio station. It is used as part of the Broadcasting: Radio course and Journalism program.
- Conestoga Connected is a weekly half-hour newsmagazine all about Conestoga College student programs, news, events, innovations, sports, life off-campus and alumni. It is created and produced by second-year Broadcast Television students.
- Conestoga College Digital TV (CCDTV) is an online TV station run by the School of Creative Industries. It features original shows and updates students about the current affairs. The channel officially launched on June 12, 2024.

=== Student sports ===
Conestoga College student sports teams are named the "Condors". They compete against varsity level teams. There are also intramural and extramural programs.

== Notable alumni ==
- Will Ferguson, Ontario politician and Cabinet member
- Barry Greenwald, whose 1975 student film Metamorphosis at Conestoga College won the Short Film Palme d'Or at the Cannes Film Festival
- Brenda Halloran, RN and mayor of Waterloo
- Mark Hebscher, television and radio personality, and author
- Brenda Irving, CBC Television sports journalist
- David Shoalts, sports reporter and columnist for the Globe and Mail
- Jonny Staub, radio and television personality
- Elizabeth Wettlaufer, serial killer and former registered nurse

== Gallery ==
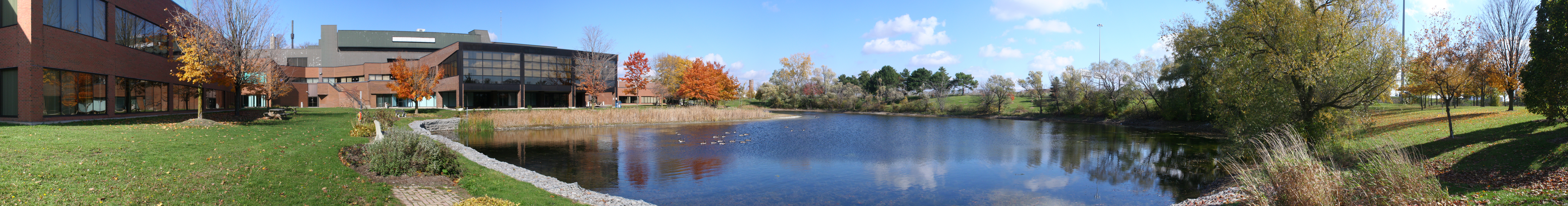
Doon Campus Library and pond

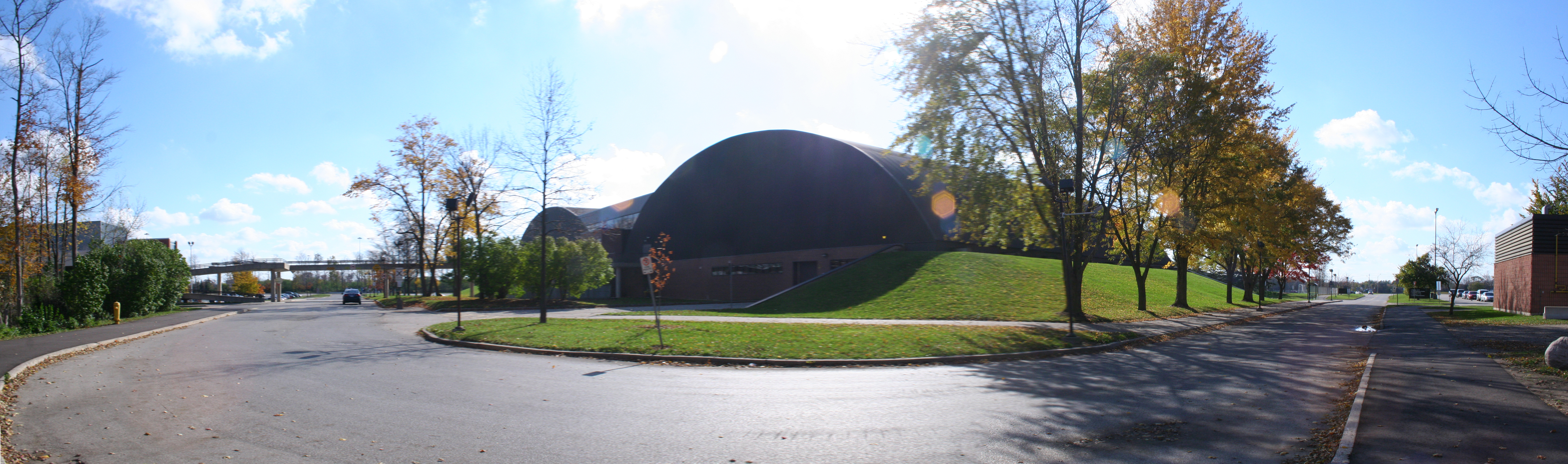
Doon Campus sidewalk

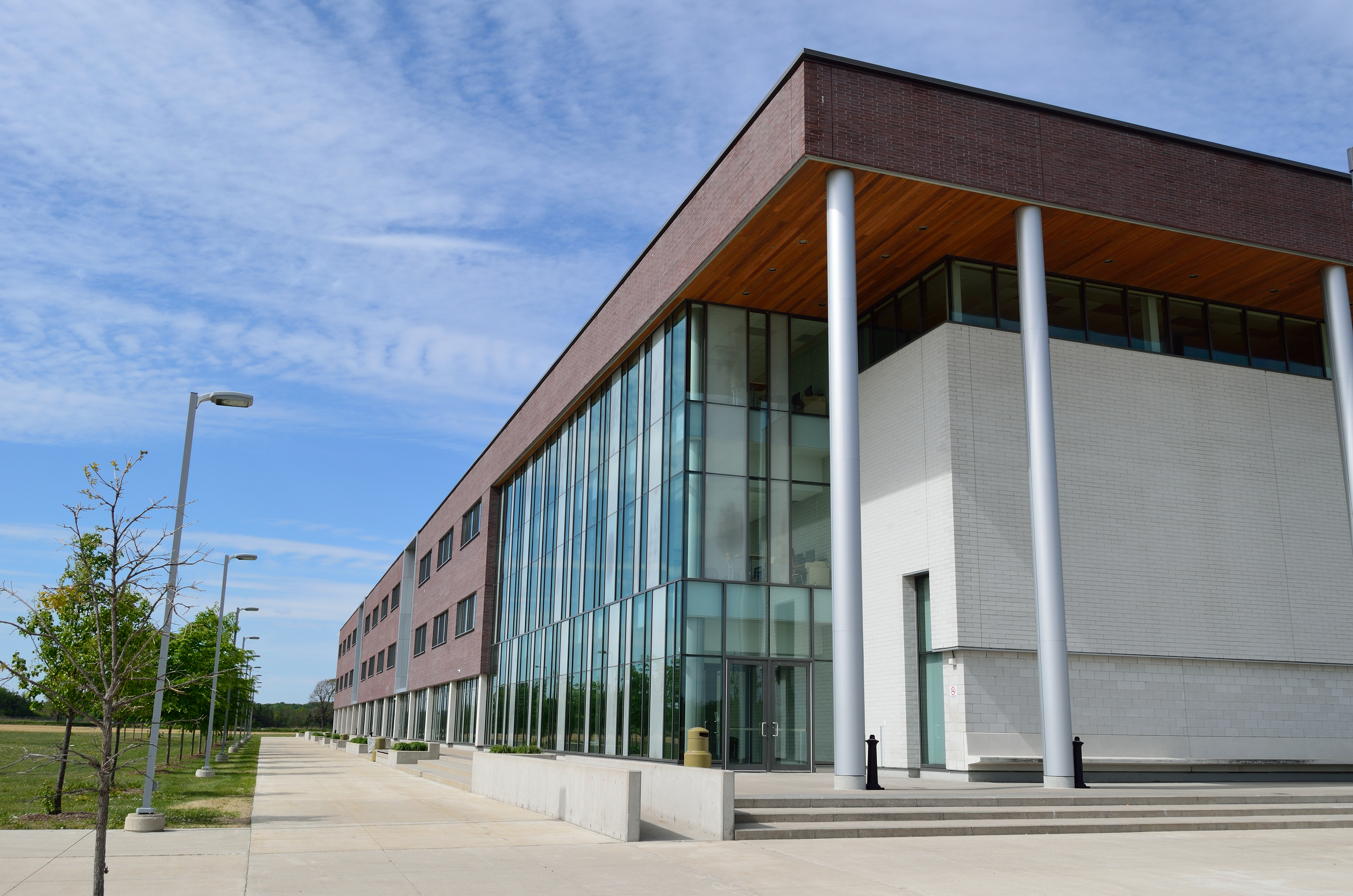
Cambridge Campus building

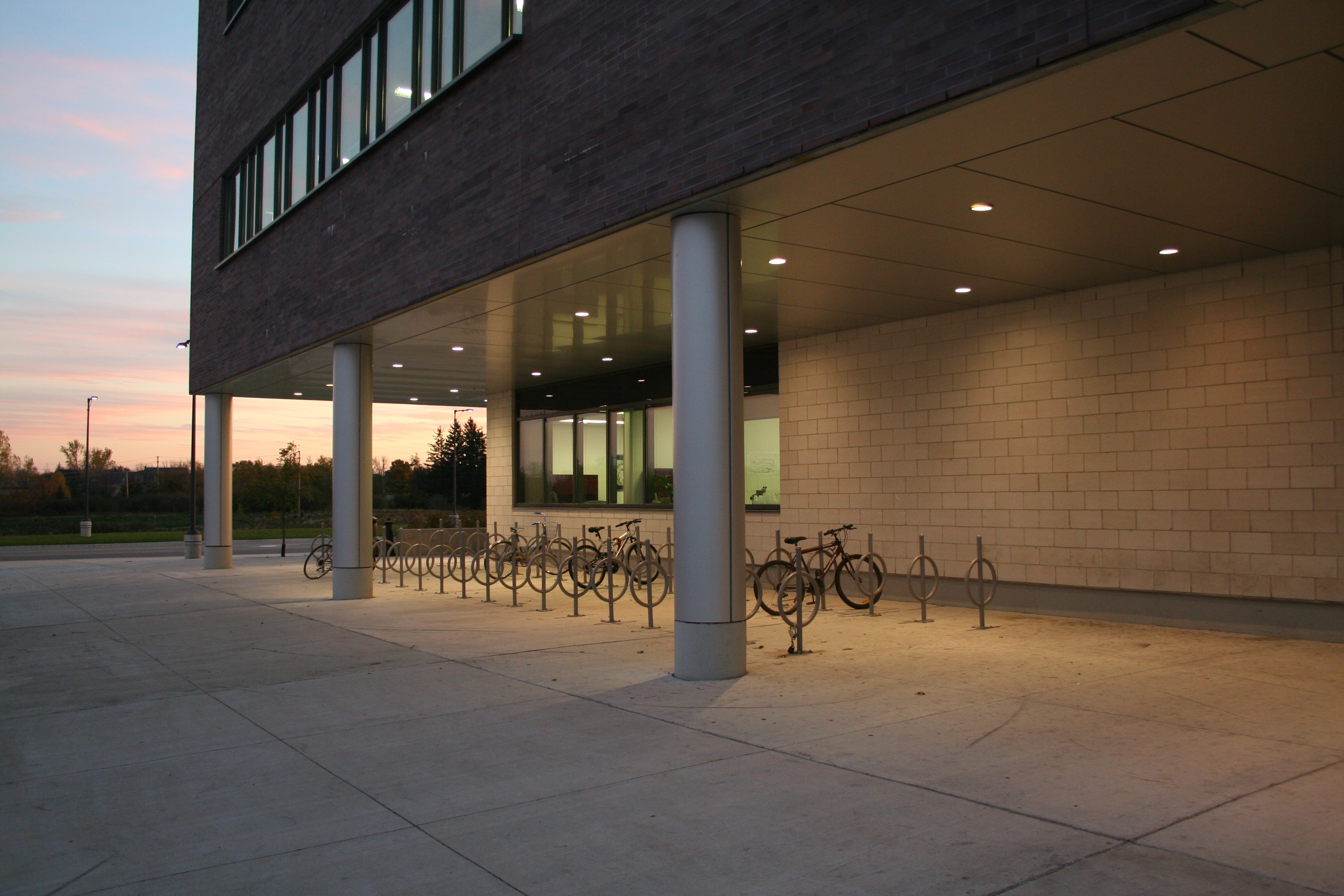
Cambridge Campus bike rack

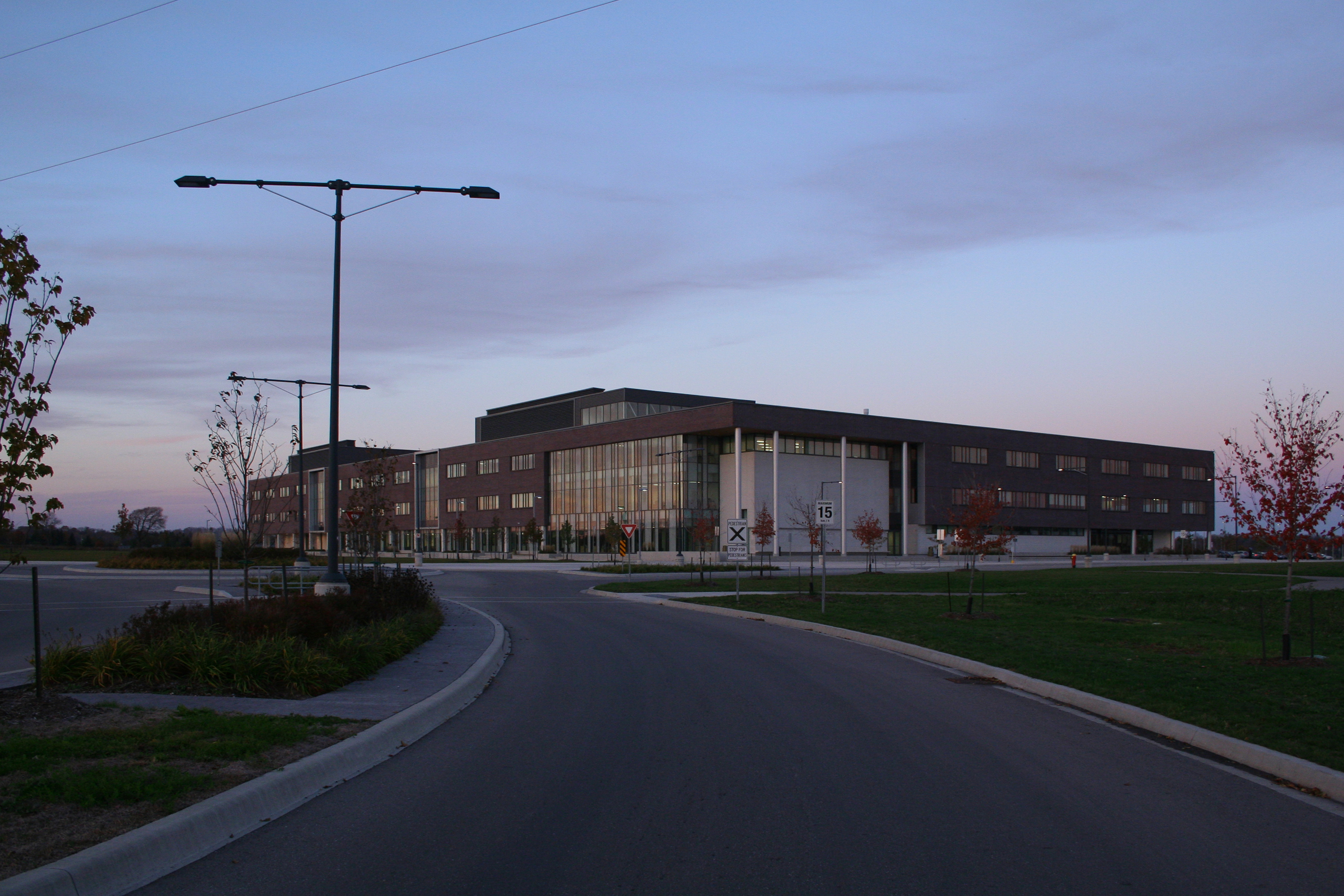
Cambridge Campus

== See also ==
- Higher education in Ontario
- List of colleges in Ontario
