= Fidani =

Fidani is a surname of Italian origin. Notable people with the surname include:

- Carlo Fidani, Canadian businessman and philanthropist
- Demofilo Fidani (1914−1994), Italian film director
- Orazio Fidani (1610−1656), Italian painter
- Orey Fidani (born 1986), Canadian racing driver
- Sébastien Fidani (born 1978), French former professional footballer
