= Sandra Trehub =

Canadian psychologist (1938–2023)

Sandra Trehub (May 21, 1938 — January 20, 2023) was a Canadian psychologist recognized for her research in the psychology of music. She completed her PhD in psychology at McGill University, and subsequently joined the faculty of the Department of Psychological and Brain Sciences at the University of Toronto Mississauga, where she spent her entire career.

Trehub conducted research on the development of auditory perception among infants and young children. She also conducted research on the impacts of singing to infants in the course of caregiving. In one study, Trehub and colleagues demonstrated that infants who were sung to stayed settled for twice as long compared to when those who were spoken to.

Trehub died on January 20, 2023. She was awarded the Society for Music Perception and Cognition Achievement Award in 2013. The citation for the award stated that Trehub's "pioneering and seminal research in developmental music cognition has been a crucial contribution" to the psychology of music.

== Selected works ==
- Trehub, Sandra E. (1976). "The Discrimination of Foreign Speech Contrasts by Infants and Adults". Child Development. 47 (2): 466–472. doi:10.2307/1128803. JSTOR 1128803.
- Trehub, Sandra E.; Bull, Dale; Thorpe, Leigh A. (1984). "Infants' Perception of Melodies: The Role of Melodic Contour". Child Development. 55 (3): 821–30. doi:10.2307/1130133. JSTOR 1130133. PMID 6734320.
- Trainor, Laurel J.; Trehub, Sandra E. (1992). "A comparison of infants' and adults' sensitivity to Western musical structure". Journal of Experimental Psychology: Human Perception and Performance. 18 (2): 394–402. doi:10.1037/0096-1523.18.2.394. PMID 1593226.
- Trehub, Sandra E. (2003). "The developmental origins of musicality". Nature Neuroscience. 6 (7): 669–673. doi:10.1038/nn1084. PMID 12830157. S2CID 18964113.
- Trehub, Sandra (2003). "Musical Predispositions in Infancy: An Update". In Peretz, Isabelle; Zatorre, Robert J. (eds.). The Cognitive Neuroscience of Music. Oxford: Oxford University Press. ISBN 978-0-19-852519-6.
- Hannon, Erin E.; Trehub, Sandra E. (2005). "Metrical Categories in Infancy and Adulthood". Psychological Science. 16 (1): 48–55. doi:10.1111/j.0956-7976.2005.00779.x. PMID 15660851. S2CID 5740696.
- Hannon, E. E.; Trehub, S. E. (2005). "Tuning in to musical rhythms: Infants learn more readily than adults". Proceedings of the National Academy of Sciences. 102 (35): 12639–12643. Bibcode:2005PNAS..10212639H. doi:10.1073/pnas.0504254102. PMC 1194930. PMID 16105946.
- Trehub, Sandra E.; Hannon, Erin E. (2006). "Infant music perception: Domain-general or domain-specific mechanisms?". Cognition. 100 (1): 73–99. doi:10.1016/j.cognition.2005.11.006. PMID 16380107. S2CID 21506075.
