= Rebecca Wittmann =

Canadian historian

Rebecca Elizabeth Wittmann
- Born: February 3, 1970 (age 56)
- Education: University of Toronto (BA, PhD); University of Southern California (MA)
- Occupations: Historian, writer, and professor
- Writing career
- Subjects: Holocaust, postwar Germany, trials of Nazi perpetrators and terrorists, and German legal history
- Notable work: Beyond Justice: The Auschwitz Trial
- Notable awards: Fraenkel Prize in Contemporary European History (2005);

Rebecca Elizabeth Wittmann is a Canadian historian, writer, and associate professor of history at the University of Toronto Mississauga. Her research interests focus primarily on the Holocaust, post-war Germany, the trials of Nazi perpetrators, and German legal history. Beyond Justice: The Auschwitz Trial, her debut book, was awarded the Fraenkel Prize in Contemporary History from the Wiener Library in 2005.

== Early life and education ==
Wittmann was born on February 3, 1970.

In 1992, she graduated from the University of Toronto with her Bachelor of Arts degree. Two years later, Wittmann earned her Master's degree from the University of Southern California. In 2001, she graduated with her PhD from the University of Toronto.

== Career ==
Wittmann is an associate professor of history at the University of Toronto Mississauga. She mainly teaches classes in Modern and Contemporary Europe, the Holocaust, and remembering atrocities. In her classes, Wittmann encourages her students to "deconstruct their notion of evil."

She has previously earned fellowships from the Alexander von Humboldt Foundation, Social Sciences and Humanities Research Council of Canada, United States Holocaust Memorial Museum, and German Academic Exchange Service (DAAD). Wittmann has written for various journals, including German History, Ethics and International Affairs, Central European History and Lessons and Legacies.

In 2005, Wittmann's first book, Beyond Justice: The Auschwitz Trial won the Fraenkel Prize in Contemporary European History for Best Book Manuscript from the Wiener Library. At the time she was doing research for the book, the trial had not yet been transcribed. Wittmann had to listen to the tapes of the trials, which helped bring, "to life the atmosphere of the trial in a way that the written word can't do."

Currently, she is working on her second book titled, Nazism and Terrorism: The Madjanek and Stammheim Trials in 1975 West Germany. So far, she has spent a year researching in Germany.

== Awards ==
- Alexander von Humboldt Fellowship, 2004-05
- Fraenkel Prize in Contemporary European History for Best Book Manuscript, Wiener Library, 2005
- Dean's Special Merit Award for Teaching and Research Excellence, University of Toronto Mississauga, 2005
- Fritz Stem Dissertation Prize for the 2001 dissertation in Germany history, German Historical Institute, Washington D.C., 2002
- Honorable Mention, Bullen Prize for the Best 2001 history dissertation written in Canada, Canadian Historical Association, 2002

== Bibliography ==
=== Books ===
- Beyond Justice: The Auschwitz Trial, 2005, ISBN 978-0674016941

=== Articles ===
- "The Wheels of Justice Turn Slowly: The Pre-Trial Investigations of the Frankfurt Auschwitz Trial," Central European History, 2002
- "Indicting Auschwitz? The Paradox of the Auschwitz Trial," German History, 2003
- Wittmann, Rebecca E. (Spring 2003). "Telling the story : survivor testimony and the narration of the Frankfurt Auschwitz trial". Bulletin of the German Historical Institute. 32: 93–101. Archived from the original on 2017-10-05.
- "Legitimating the Criminal State: Former Nazi Judges on the Stand at the Frankfurt Auschwitz Trial," Lessons and Legacies VI: New Currents in Holocaust Research, 2004
