= Jessica Burgner-Kahrs =

German roboticist (born 1981)

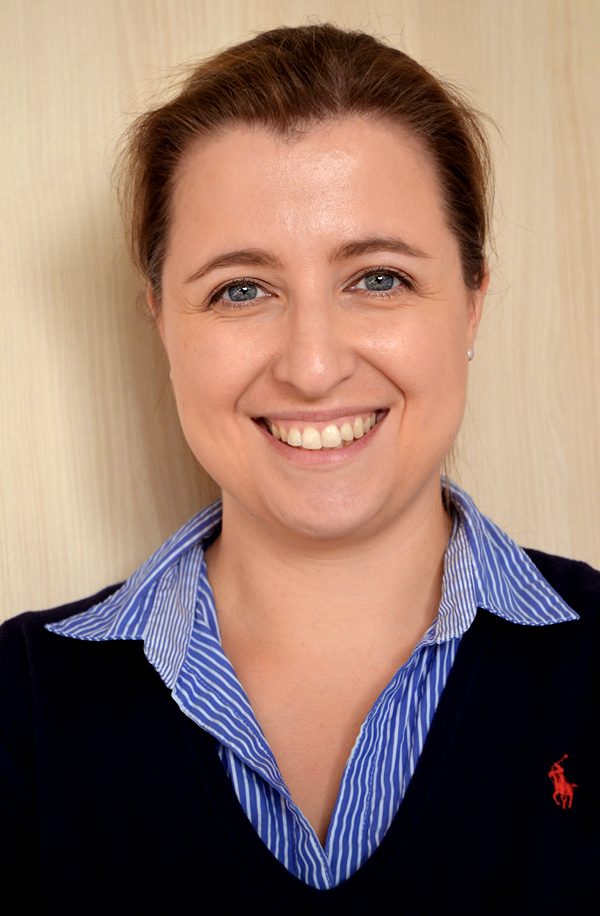
- Burgner-Kahrs in 2017
- Born: 1981 (age 44–45)

Academic background
- Education: Karlsruhe Institute of Technology

Academic work
- Institutions: University of Toronto
- Website: cs.toronto.edu/~jbk

Jessica Burgner-Kahrs (born 1981) is a German roboticist who works in Canada as an associate professor at the University of Toronto. Her research concerns continuum robotics, which she defines as the study of robots that can bend smoothly along their length (like a snake or tentacle) rather than being articulated at a discrete set of joints. The applications of this technology include minimally invasive surgery and servicing industrial machinery.

== Education and career ==
Burgner-Kahrs was born in 1981 in Wuppertal. She earned a diplom (the German equivalent of a master's degree) in computer science in 2006 at the Karlsruhe Institute of Technology. Continuing her studies there, she completed a doctorate (Dr.-Ing.) in 2010. Her dissertation, Robot Assisted Laser Osteotomy, was supervised by Heinz Wörn.

After postdoctoral research in the US at the Vanderbilt University Department of Mechanical Engineering, she returned to Germany in 2012 as a German Academic Exchange Service Fellow at Leibniz University Hannover. In 2013 she was awarded an Emmy Noether Fellowship. She became an associate professor at Leibniz University Hannover before moving to her present position at the University of Toronto (U of T) in 2019. At U of T, she holds joint affiliations with the Department of Mathematical and Computational Sciences, Department of Computer Science, and the Department of Mechanical & Industrial Engineering. She directs the Continuum Robotics Laboratory on U of T's Mississauga campus, and is an associate director of the university's Robotics Institute.

== Recognition ==
Burgner-Kahrs was a 2015 recipient of the Heinz Maier-Leibnitz Prize of the German Research Foundation, "the most important prize for early career researchers in Germany".
