= Terrence Donnelly Health Sciences Complex =

Building at the University of Toronto Mississauga

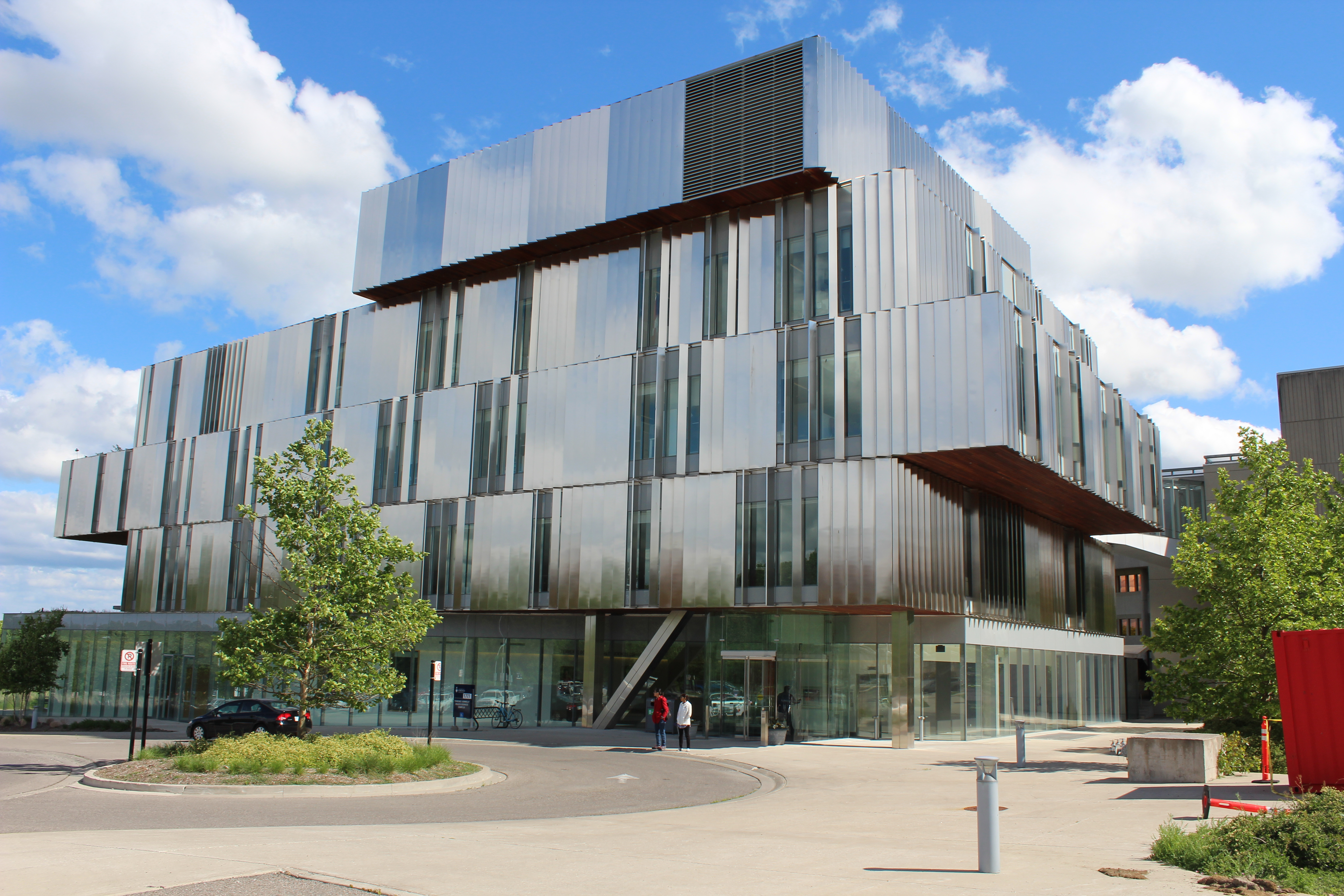

General information
- Location: 1777 Outer Circle; Mississauga, Ontario, Canada
- Coordinates: 43°32′59″N 79°39′43″W
- Opening: November 1, 2011 (15 years ago)
- Owner: University of Toronto

Technical details
- Floor count: 4
- Floor area: 5,960m^{2}

Other information
- Public transit: UTM bus terminal

The Terrence Donnelly Health Sciences Complex (TDHSC) is an academic building of the University of Toronto located on its Mississauga campus in Mississauga, Ontario, Canada. The building is home to the Mississauga Academy of Medicine (MAM), one of the four academies in the Temerty Faculty of Medicine's MD program. It was built in 2011 as part of an effort to expand Ontario health care education, and is the only medical school location in Mississauga.

The Faculty of Medicine is affiliated with Trillium Health Partners' teaching hospitals in Mississauga for students in the Mississauga Academy of Medicine. Apart from MAM, the Health Sciences Complex houses the UTM Biomedical Communications program and the Department of Anthropology. It was designed by Kongats Architects Toronto, with funding provided by Carlo Fidani, Terrence Donnelly, and the Provincial Government. Carlo Fidani donated $10 million for building costs, scholarships, and a chair in family and community medicine. Terrence Donnelly donated $12 million to building costs and scholarships. Capital funding for the project of $30.3 million was provided by the Provincial Government. The construction for the 5,960 square meter (64,153 square feet), four-storey building began the summer of 2009. The building officially opened on November 1, 2011.

The building was designed like a "stacked box," built on a slope between the Communication, Culture and Technology and William G. Davis buildings, with an elevated walkway built connecting to the latter. Inside the building are modern classrooms, seminar rooms, computer facilities, learning spaces and laboratories, a student lounge, and outdoor terrace.

== Awards ==
The TDHSC was designed to achieve a North American LEED Gold sustainability designation and received a 2012 Governor General's Medal in Architecture.

== See also ==
- List of University of Toronto buildings
