= University of Toronto Mississauga =

University of Toronto campus in Mississauga, Canada

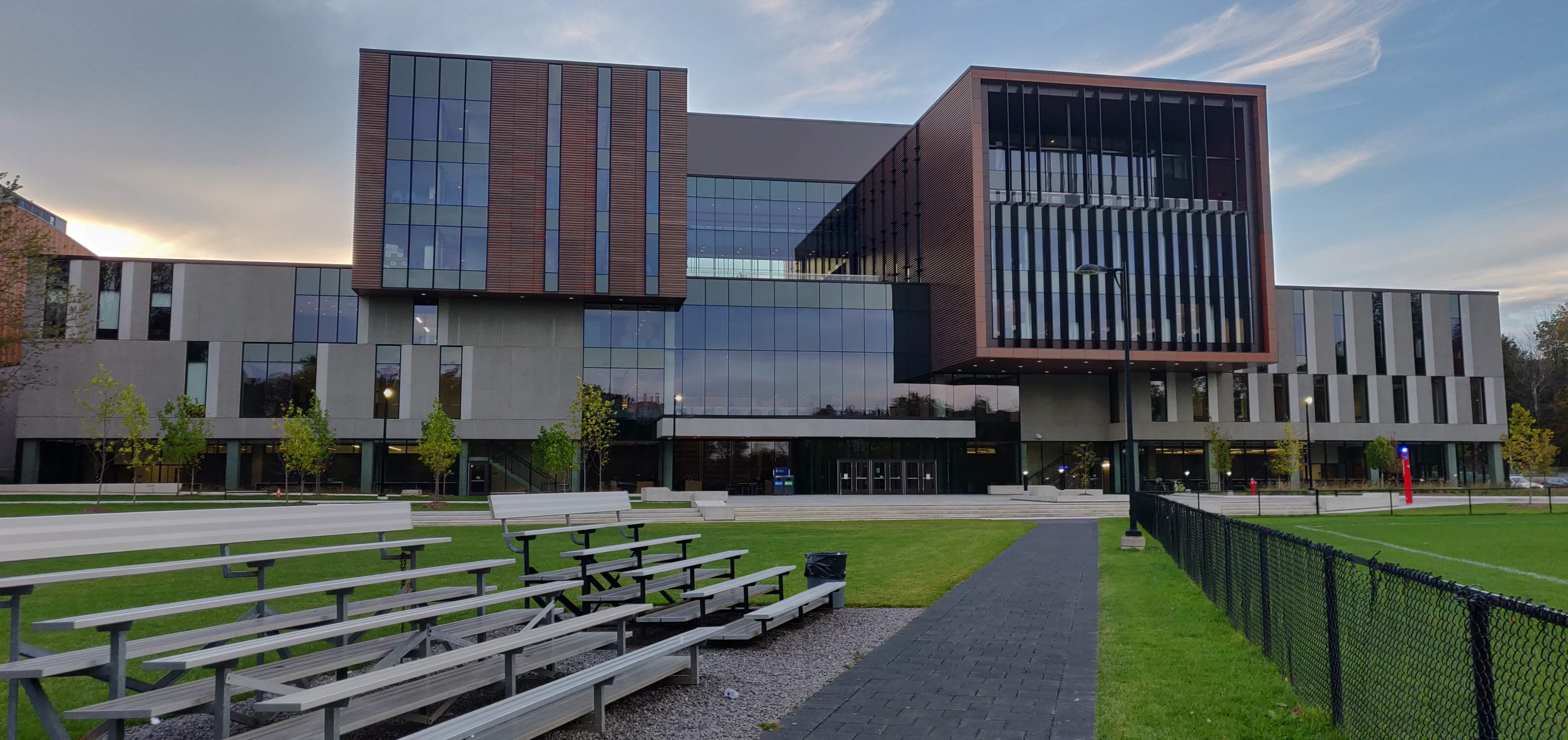
- Maanjiwe nendamowinan, opened in 2018
- Other name: Mississauga Campus
- Former names: Erindale College (1965–2003); University of Toronto at Mississauga (1998–2007)
- Motto: Tantum nobis creditum (Latin)
- Motto in English: "So much has been entrusted to us"
- Type: Public
- Established: 1967; 59 years ago
- Parent institution: University of Toronto
- Principal: Alexandra Gillespie
- Dean: William Gough
- Total staff: 3,700+ (2026)
- Students: 17,361 (2026)
- Undergraduates: 16,546
- Postgraduates: 815
- Location: Mississauga, Ontario, Canada; 43°32′54″N 79°39′48″W
- Campus: Suburban, 225 acres (91 ha)
- Newspaper: The Medium
- Mascot: Rocky the Eagle
- Website: utm.utoronto.ca

The University of Toronto Mississauga (U of T Mississauga or UTM) is one of the three campuses of the University of Toronto and its second-largest academic division, located in Mississauga, Ontario, Canada. Opened in 1967, the campus comprises 225 acres (91 ha) of Greenbelt forest along the valley of the Credit River, situated between the neighbourhoods of Erin Mills and Erindale.

Originally established as Erindale College, a constituent college of the Faculty of Arts and Science, it became its own academic division of the university in 2003 following significant growth in student enrolment. The campus has since expanded to become the University of Toronto's second-largest location in terms of both enrolment and land area, the other two of which are the St. George and Scarborough campuses.

The Mississauga campus offers more than 180 programs at both the undergraduate and graduate level, offered through 15 academic departments, four institutions, and other University of Toronto divisions, including the Temerty Faculty of Medicine and Lawrence Bloomberg Faculty of Nursing. The campus mainly provides undergraduate education in arts, science, and business—similar to the Faculty of Arts and Science on the St. George campus—and offers graduate programs through the tri-campus School of Graduate Studies.

== Campus history ==
=== Pre-colonization ===
Before the arrival of European colonizers, the grounds on which the University of Toronto Mississauga stands today were inhabited by Indigenous peoples. The area surrounding the Missinnihe (the "trusting creek"), known today as the Credit River, was covered by a peace agreement between the Anishinaabe and Haudensaunee Confederacy under a Dish With One Spoon treaty. Other groups to use the land included the Huron-Wendat, the Seneca, and later the Mississaugas of the Credit First Nation. Ownership of the land was transferred from the Mississaugas to the British Crown under Treaty 13A, part of the Toronto Purchase which was finalized in 1805 and remained disputed until a 2010 settlement by the Mississaugas and the Government of Canada.

=== Erindale College (1967–2003) ===
Following the Second World War and the resulting baby boom, a predicted influx of university-aged applicants led the University of Toronto under president Claude Bissell to develop plans for new constituent colleges which would expand its students capacity. Among these new colleges planned in the late 1950s, two would be at a distance from the university's original campus in Toronto to serve the growing Greater Toronto Area. In 1963, the university purchased a 150-acre area of a village called Springfield-on-the-Credit in the rural Township of Toronto (in what is now the city of Mississauga) and a separate plot of land east of Toronto which would become Scarborough College the same year. The Toronto Township site was mainly farmland and included Lislehurst, part of the estate of Charlotte Schreiber's family which had been sold to businessman Reginald Watkins in 1928.

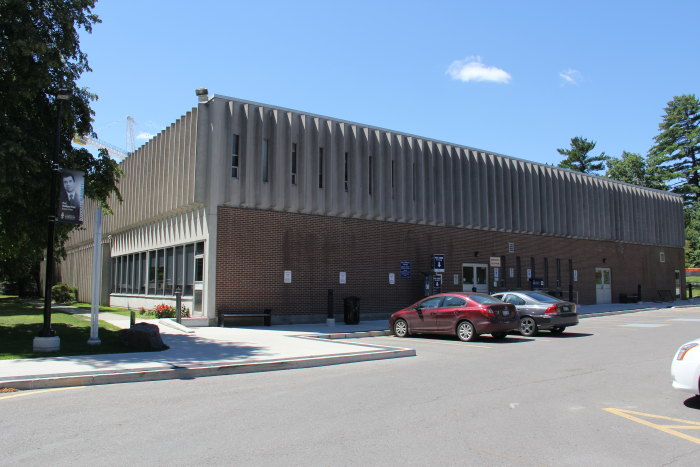
The North Building was the first to be built at Erindale College.

Erindale College, named after the nearby community of Erindale, was founded on May 23, 1963, shortly after Scarborough College; however, its campus did not welcome its first cohort until four years later in 1967. Erindale and Scarborough colleges were created as part of an expansion of the Faculty of Arts and Science's collegiate system following the establishment of New College in 1962 and Innis College in 1964, and they became the first regional expansions of the University of Toronto since the Ajax Division, which closed more than a decade prior. They were the first and only colleges to establish their campuses at a distance from the original St. George campus. Erindale's first courses leading to the Bachelor of Arts degree were offered in 1965, at Thomas L. Kennedy Secondary School in Toronto Township. David Carlton Williams, who spearheaded the effort to establish the new campuses outside of Toronto, was appointed as Erindale's first principal. The college's first dean was John Colman. Williams asked chemistry professor E. A. (Peter) Robinson to be the college's first associate dean, a role which he began in 1966. Robinson later went on to become dean of Erindale and its third principal. Construction of a temporary academic building began in 1966, later known as the North Building. The site was officially opened as Erindale College in September 1967 to an inaugural class of 155 students.

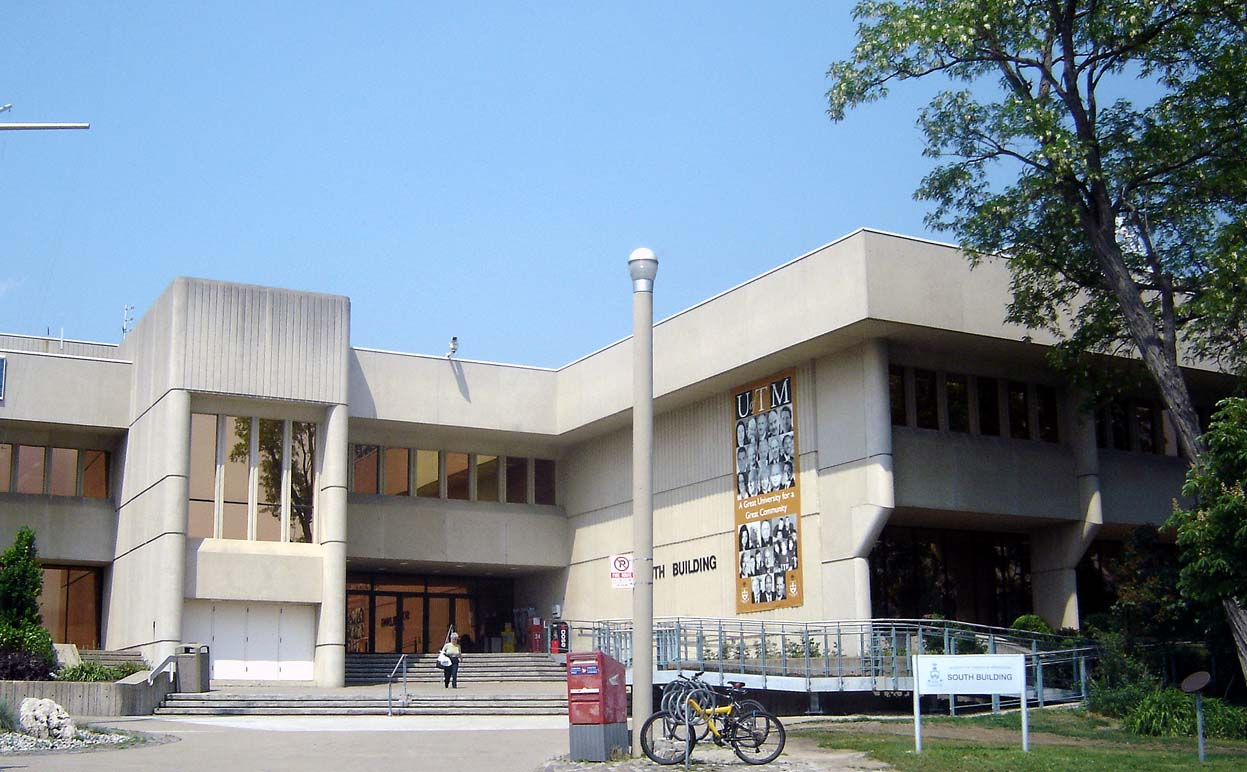
The main college building, the William G. Davis Building, in 2005; then known as the South Building.

During this time, Erindale operated under academic direction of the Faculty of Arts and Science as "the U. of T.'s western off-campus college." In 1969, the college hosted the first showcase of Moon rock samples in Canada. In 1970, it saw its first graduating class, which consisted of 70 students. Architect and University of Toronto professor John Andrews was commissioned to create the original Campus Master Plan after his work at Scarborough, however the project was taken over by Raymond Moriyama, who envisioned one "central mega-structure" atop the Credit River Valley that would preserve the surrounding natural environment. Construction on the first portion of the South Building (later renamed the William G. Davis Building) was completed in 1971, called the Research Wing and later named in honour of Erindale's second principal, John Tuzo Wilson. The final part of the South Building was completed in 1973. In 1975, Erindale College became the first college of the University of Toronto to be granted its own official coat of arms; it displayed the Latin motto tantum nobis creditum, meaning "so much has been entrusted to us."

The period that followed the opening of the South Building saw Erindale College maintain a slow and steady growth. In 1981, the campus hosted the annual Society for American Baseball Research (SABR) conference, the first time it was held outside of the United States. In 1992, the Kaneff Centre was opened, named after benefactor Ignat Kaneff. In 1998, Erindale College became known as the University of Toronto at Mississauga, while retaining the Erindale name officially. It's Student Centre was opened in 1999, serving as the headquarters of the Erindale College Student Union, The Medium newspaper, and various student clubs and societies.

=== Modern history ===
The campus took its current form as an academic division of the University of Toronto in the 2003–2004 year, becoming a faculty separate from the Faculty of Arts and Science. The position of its dean was formally instated and the campus formed new academic departments under its new structure. The role of the campus principal, held at the time by biology professor Ian Orchard, was expanded to now include vice-presidential responsibilities of the University of Toronto. The turn of the century saw substantial growth in its student population, and the campus underwent an expansion with the addition of several large academic buildings, including the Communication, Culture and Technology (CCT) building in 2004, and the Recreation, Athletics and Wellness Centre (RAWC) in 2006. Residence halls Erindale Hall and Oscar Peterson Hall were completed in 2003 and 2007 respectively. In 2007, the campus officially adopted its present name, the University of Toronto Mississauga. That same year, the university acquired the nearby Old Erindale Public School (now known as Alumni House) and the campus celebrated its 40th anniversary, a milestone which was capped off with the grand opening of the Hazel McCallion Academic Learning Centre – the new campus library building – on June 2, 2007.

The 2010s saw the campus grow by approximately 1,000 students every year. More buildings were under construction to accommodate the student population, and older ones such as the South Building (renamed the William G. Davis Building) saw major renovations to modernize the spaces. New buildings were designed to be modern, both in appearance and their prioritization of sustainability with the goal of meeting LEED certification in all new campus structures. These included the Instructional Centre and Terrence Donnelly Health Sciences Complex in 2011. The Mississauga Academy of Medicine (MAM) opened in 2011 with a class of 54 students. It was created as a clinical partnership between the Temerty Faculty of Medicine and the three hospitals of the Trillium Health Partners system to expand the university's MD Program to the Mississauga campus.

2014 saw a $35 million expansion of the Kaneff Centre known as the Innovation Complex, which coincided with the establishment of the Institute for Management and Innovation (IMI), an academic unit which provides interdisciplinary graduate programs including a Master of Management and Professional Accounting (MMPA) degree.

In April of that year, the UTM Eagles started a varsity sports program becoming the 30th member of the Ontario College Athletic Association (OCAA). Sports offered included badminton, cross country, and men's and women's indoor soccer.

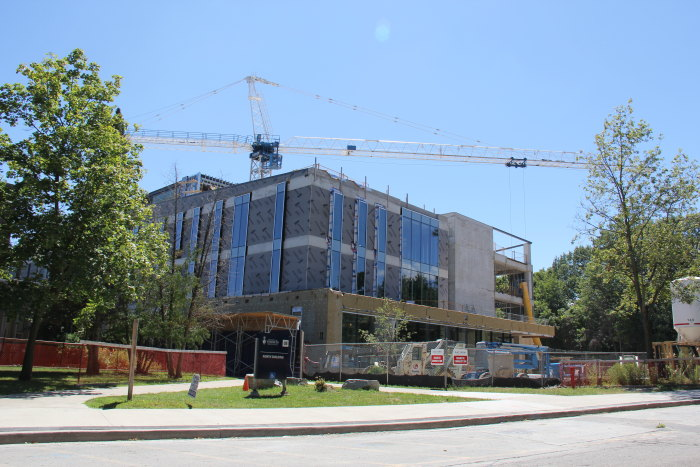
Deerfield Hall under construction in 2013

Also during this time, plans were developed to replace the aging North Building, which had lasted since the campus opened in 1967 despite its original intention of being temporary. The building was demolished in two stages and partially replaced by Deerfield Hall as the first phase of reconstruction. The remaining North Building was fully removed by 2015, with some of its materials repurposed to build phase two, dubbed the New North Building: a large, modern, six-storey structure in its place. In 2017, the campus celebrated its 50th anniversary, a milestone that coincided with Canada's sesquicentennial. Phase two of the North Building reconstruction was finished in 2018 and officially named Maanjiwe nendamowinan (an Anishinaabemowin term meaning "gathering of minds") in 2019 following input from the campus community and the Mississaugas of the Credit First Nation.

The Eagles varsity program stopped competing in 2020 during a temporary suspension of OCAA athletics due to the COVID-19 pandemic, and the program did not return once the OCAA resumed competition. The program formally ceased operations following the 2021–22 academic year.

In 2022, the Amazon Prime Video television series Gen V filmed its first season, with production mainly taking place at the University of Toronto Mississauga and the Greater Toronto Area. Gen V returned to the campus to film its second season in 2024.

In September 2026, the University of Toronto's Lawrence Bloomberg Faculty of Nursing expanded its undergraduate nursing program with its first cohort at the Mississauga campus. The same year, the first new student residence on campus since Oscar Peterson Hall opened, comprising six-stories and 400 beds. On November 2, 2026, UTM issued a shelter-in-place order as a 19-year-old man carrying a firearm entered the McLuhan Court residence, resulting in an evacuation of nearby residences. Although no students were injured, the man is suspected to have shot himself inside the residence following an hours-long standoff with Peel Regional Police. While the campus remained opened, classes were cancelled the following day.

== Location and natural environment ==
University of Toronto Mississauga Housing Museums/galleries Venues Green spaces Athletics Libraries Transit

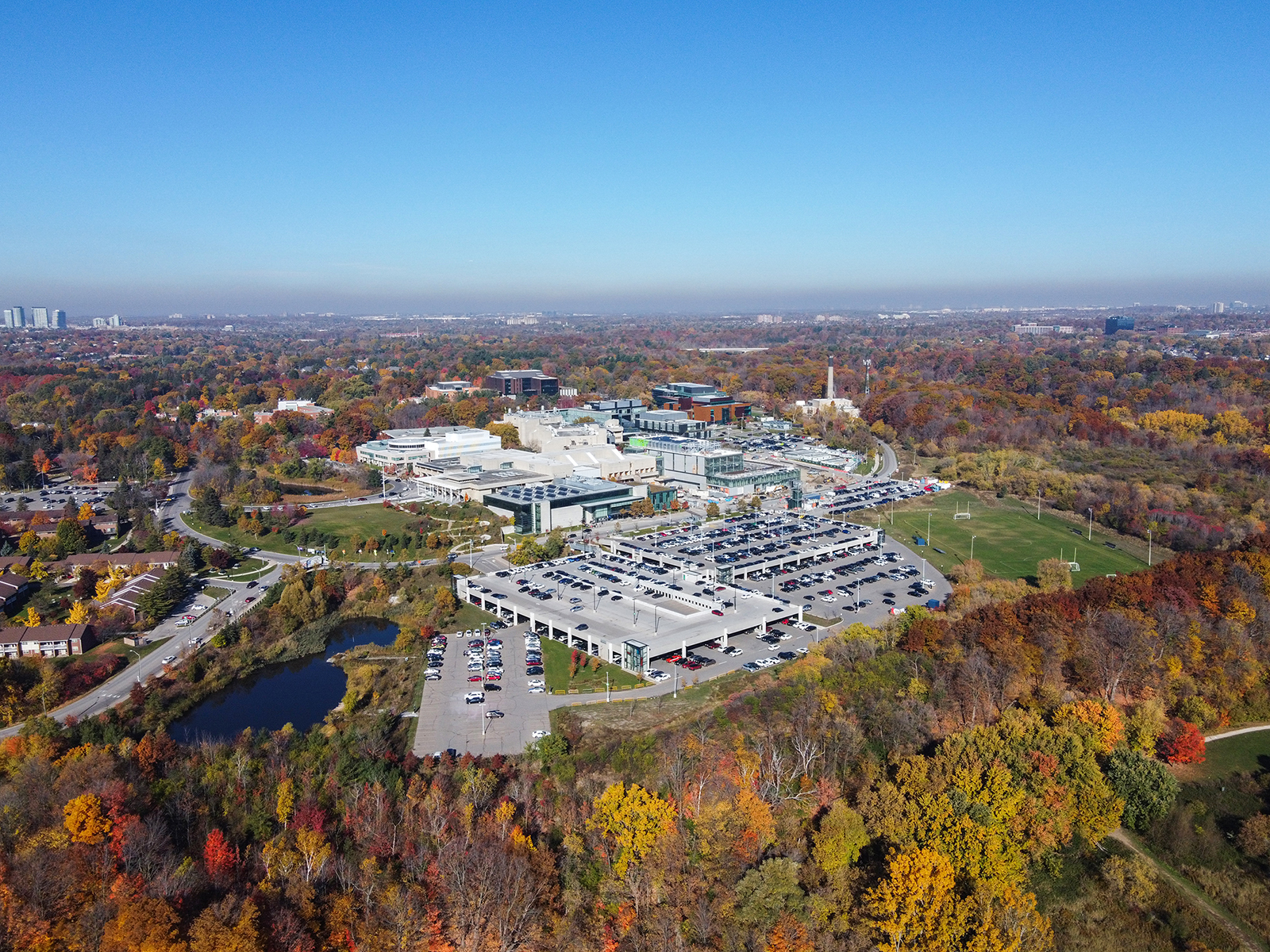
An aerial view of the Mississauga campus facing north in 2022

The Mississauga campus is located between Erin Mills and Erindale on 225 acres of Greenbelt forest at the west bank of the Credit River, approximately 33 kilometres west of the St. George campus in downtown Toronto. It is the second-largest University of Toronto campus in terms of land area. The area is roughly bounded by Mississauga Road to the southwest, Burnhamthorpe Road to the northwest, and the Credit River to the east and southeast. It is an enclave of Erin Mills, a neighbourhood in west Mississauga, but considered a "Special Purpose Character Area" which is not officially part of any neighbourhood. Nearby suburban areas along Mississauga Road and the Credit Woodlands are fairly affluent sections of the city.

The Mississauga campus is known for its close proximity to nature. The UTM Nature Trail extends from the northern end of Principal's Road near Lislehurst, a historic building used as the principal's residence, along the bank of the Credit River to the southern end of the campus. Erindale Park is also within walking distance of the campus. The surrounding forest is home to a variety of wildlife including Jefferson salamanders, skunks, Canada geese, and most notably deer. Families of white-tailed deer are often present in the area and frequently found roaming the campus. The deer are the subject of interest from the campus community, as social media accounts have been created for the animals, the building Deerfield Hall named for them, and a student ID card created for one given the name "Hartley Fawn."

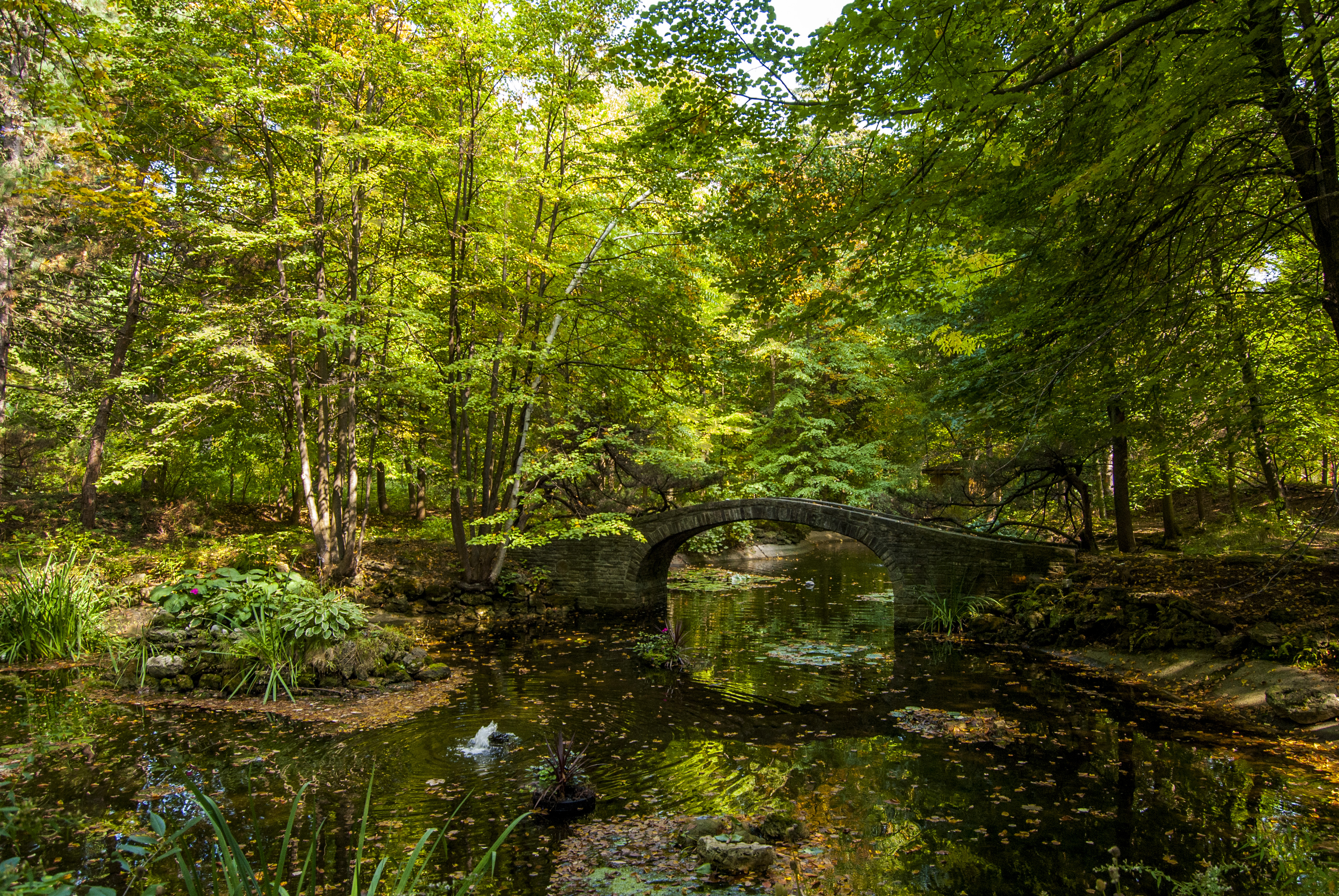
The Wilson Pond Bridge near Lislehurst, believed to be built in the 1920s–30s by Reginald Watkins.

The Mississauga campus earned Canada's first Silver Fair Trade Campus designation for the food and drink options provided on site. Every new building on campus since 2006 has been LEED-certified Silver or higher, and the Science Building as well as the Instructional Centre use geothermal heating. Some buildings also use reclaimed rain water in their plumbing. The University of Toronto Mississauga is a Gold-certified institution under the Association for the Advancement of Sustainability in Higher Education's (AASHE) Sustainability Tracking, Assessment, and Rating System (STARS). The University of Toronto was ranked the most sustainable university in the world in 2024 and 2025.

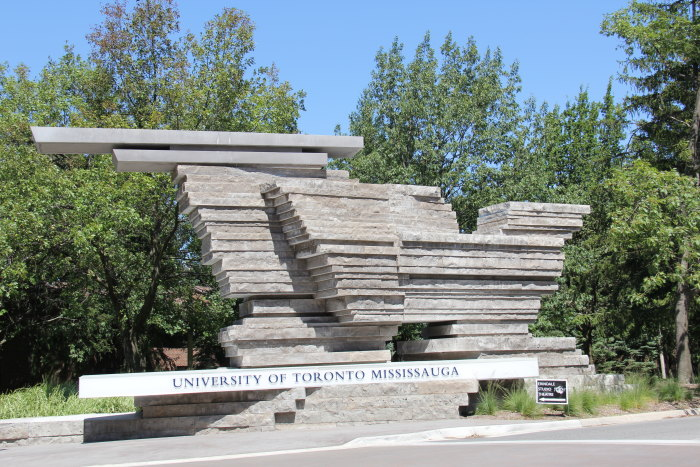
The campus entrance monument

In 2013, $1 million was spent on constructing a large stone monument at the entrance way to the campus, along with general repairs to nearby sidewalks, pedestrian crossings, lighting, and electrical equipment. The stone monument became the centre of a controversy, with an almost universally negative reaction from students due to what was seen as excessive expenditure and lack of student involvement in the approval process, though the university said that a student was on the committee that approved the project.

== Buildings ==
The Mississauga campus consists of a small number of large buildings enclosed within Outer Circle, a ring road surrounding the main academic precinct. The William G. Davis Building was the first to be built, with the original intention of being a central mega-structure and the only building on the campus. It remains the largest on the campus and has undergone numerous expansions since its opening in 1973. The campus saw substantial development in the early 2000s including residence halls and numerous academic buildings which grew outward from the Davis Building.

Mississauga campus buildings
- Academic Annex (AX)
- Alumni House (WC)
- Central Utilities Plant
- Communication, Culture and Technology Building (CC)
- Deerfield Hall (DH)
- Erindale Studio Theatre (DW)
- Forensic Crime Scene House
- Grounds Building (GF)
- Hazel McCallion Academic Learning Centre (HM)
- Innovation Complex (KN)
- Instructional Centre (IB)
- Kaneff Centre (KN)
- Leacock Lane Residence
- Lislehurst
- Maanjiwe nendamowinan (MN)
- MaGrath Valley Residence
- McLuhan Court Residence
- New Residence Building
- Oscar Peterson Hall
- Paleomagnetism Lab
- Putnam Place Residence
- Research Greenhouse (BG)
- Recreation, Athletics and Wellness Centre (RA)
- Roy Ivor Hall Residence
- Schreiberwood Residence
- Science Building (SB)
- Student Centre (XR)
- Terrence Donnelly Health Sciences Complex (HB)
- William G. Davis Building (DV)

=== William G. Davis Building ===
The oldest and largest building on campus, the William G. Davis Building (formerly the South Building), was built as a megalithic structure, predominantly out of concrete, as was typical of the brutalist architecture style of the late 1960s. It was one of architect Raymond Moriyama's first major commissions. The Davis Building has since expanded along with the addition of many more buildings over the decades following an increase in enrolment at the beginning of the twenty-first century.

=== Kaneff Centre/Innovation Complex ===
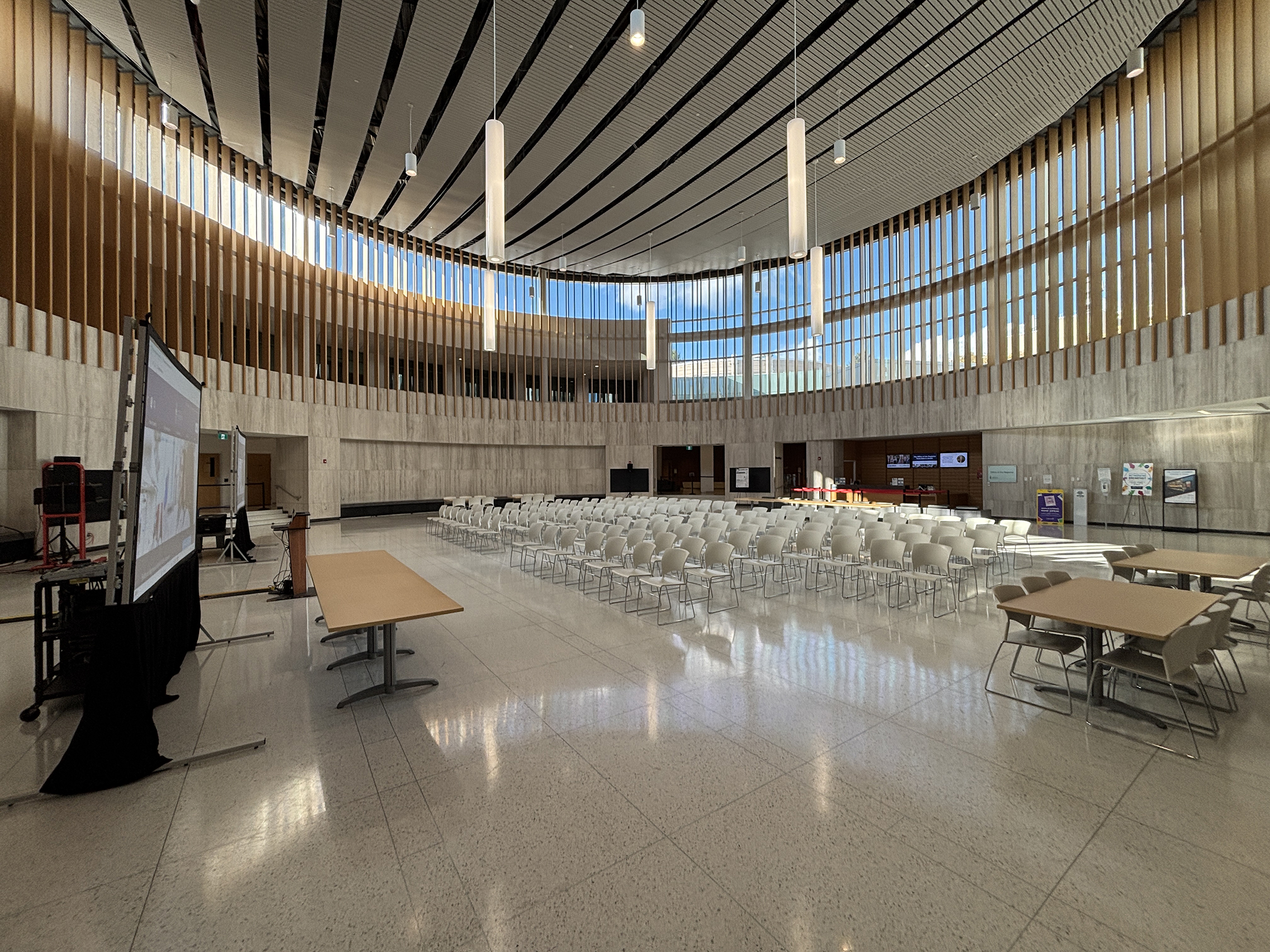
The Rotunda in the Kaneff Centre/Innovation Complex

The Innovation Complex is an expansion of the Kaneff Centre that serves as a multi-functional hub for academic, administrative, and social activities. The addition filled in the central green space within the Kaneff Centre and features a central rotunda, designed with warm-toned travertine and white oak, providing a gathering space for faculty and students which frequently hosts speaking events. It houses the Institute for Management and Innovation (IMI), which offers interdisciplinary business management education at the graduate level. The facility includes lecture rooms, behaviour research labs, and a mock trading floor, and is built to LEED Silver standards, incorporating sustainable features like a green roof and natural light harvesting. The building was designed by Moriyama & Teshima Architects and built by PCL Constructors Canada Inc. It is also the location of the campus's registrar's office.

=== Communication, Culture and Technology Building ===
The Communication, Culture and Technology (CCT) building, designed by Saucier + Perrot, was opened in September 2004. It is characterized by a black and glass exterior. The interior is finished in concrete and gray paint, with black plastic melamine on many surfaces. It houses the Institute of Communication, Culture, Information and Technology (ICCIT) and the MiST Theatre.

=== Terrence Donnelly Health Sciences Complex ===
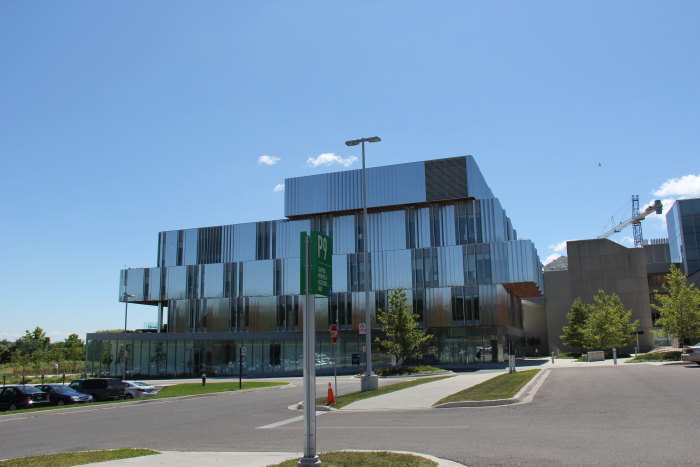
The Health Sciences Complex, home to the Mississauga Academy of Medicine and Biomedical Communications Program

The Mississauga Academy of Medicine is housed across two floors inside the Terrence Donnelly Health Sciences Complex. Built in 2011, the building is the home of the Temerty Faculty of Medicine on the Mississauga campus, and contains classroom spaces, seminar rooms, computer facilities, learning spaces and laboratories. Students are provided with fully equipped student lounge and outdoor terrace to relax and socialize. Students are able to share lectures and learning experiences both inside and outside the classroom through advanced technologies.

=== Instructional Centre ===
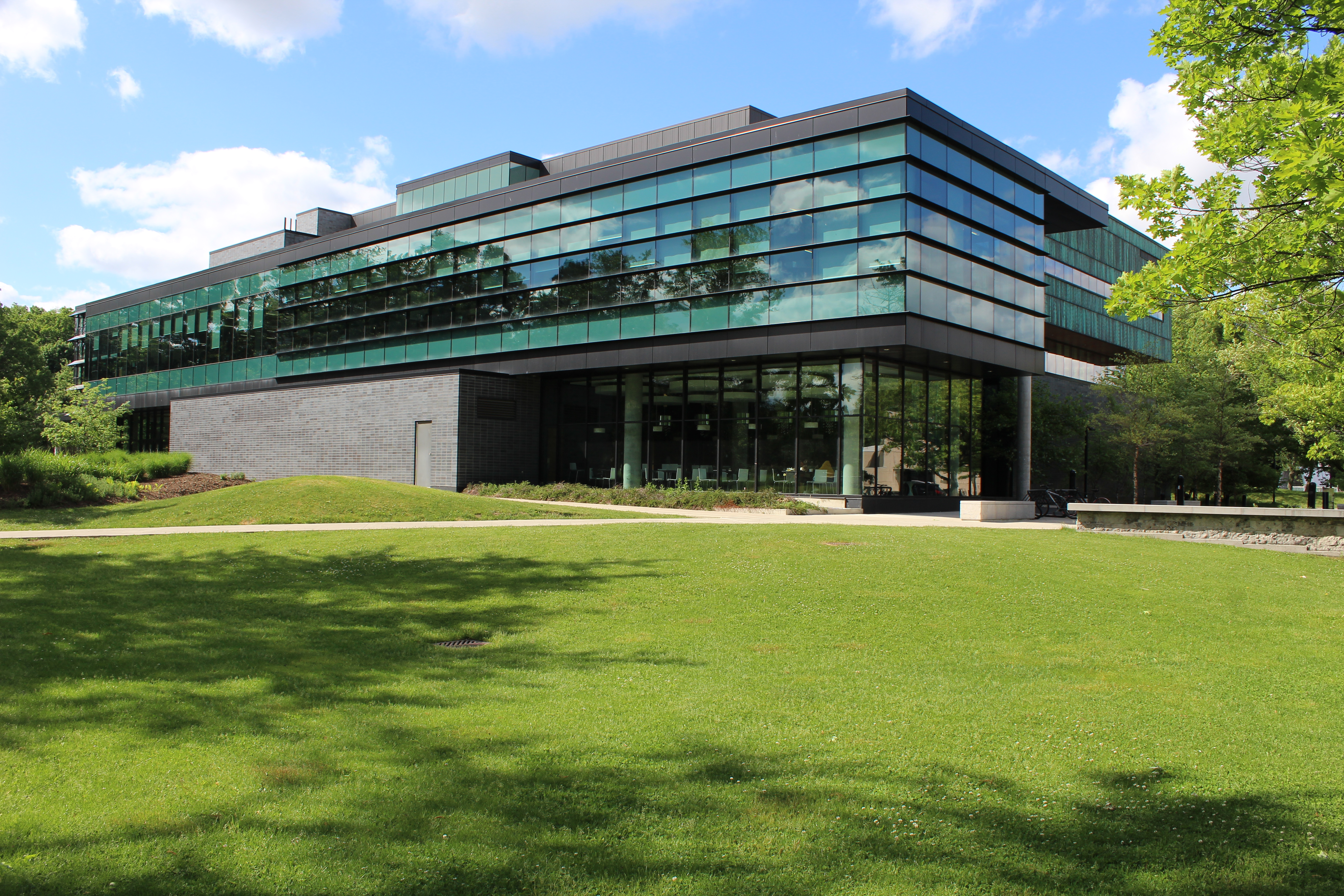
The construction of the Instructional Centre was spurred from the doubling of student enrolment since the early 2000s.

In response to growth in enrolment during the 2000s and 2010s, the Mississauga campus expanded to meet the needs of its growing student population. The Instructional Centre (IB) had plans drawn out in 2002 and opened in 2012 as the only building on campus to be purely dedicated to lecture halls and study spaces (as well as a food and lounge area). Located next to the Hazel McCallion Academic Learning Centre on Outer Circle, IB covers a total of 13,000 square metres (140,000 sq ft) of space spread out throughout its three stories. The building is composed of green oxidized copper strips on both the outside and inside. The campus's Instructional Centre includes geothermal heating and cooling systems under the nearby North Field as well as awnings with thin photovoltaic cells. Other renewable energy features include green roofs, reflective membranes to reduce heat as well as energy and water-efficient lighting and fixtures. The Instructional Centre shares its name with a building on the Scarborough campus with the building code IC, and thus uses IB as a distinction.

The construction of the building and the Health Sciences Complex meant the loss of 450 campus parking spaces, however the buildings together accommodate up to 2,500 students simultaneously. Within the Instructional Centre are two lecture halls with the capacity to fit as many as 500 students each. Also included are study rooms and a 24/7 computer lab.

The Instructional Centre was designed by Perkins+Will Canada, and won the Award of Excellence at the 30th annual Mississauga Urban Design Awards competition.

=== Deerfield Hall ===
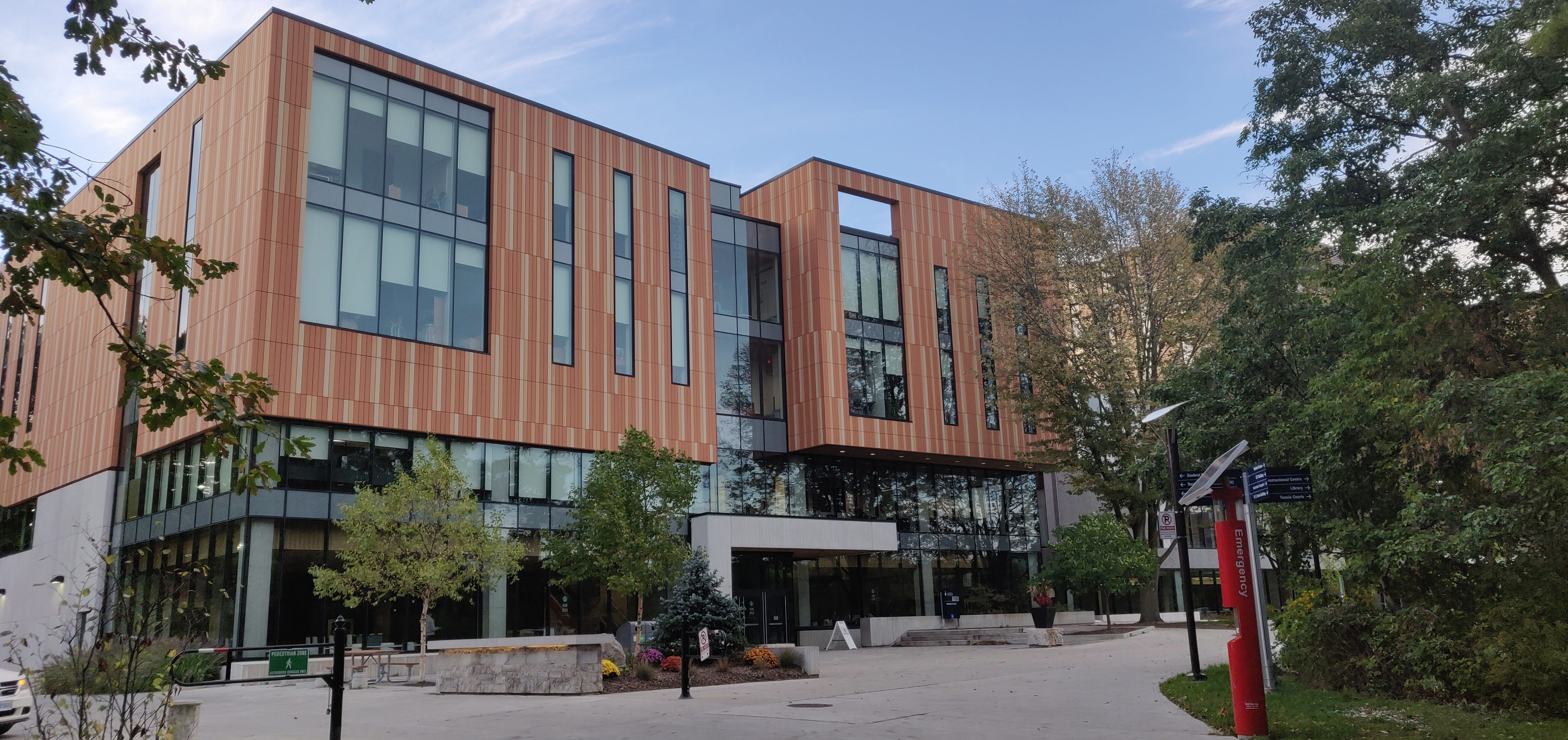
Deerfield Hall, opened in 2014

Deerfield Hall is part of the New North reconstruction on the northern end of campus. It features four storeys with theatre rehearsal space, computer labs, classrooms, offices, formal and informal study space and an expanded food services area.

=== Maanjiwe nendamowinan ===
Maanjiwe nendamowinan is a 220,595-square-foot, six-storey structure opened in September 2018. The LEED-certified project cost approximately $89 million. The Mississaugas of the Credit First Nation (MCFN) on whose traditional territory the campus now stands, recommended Maanjiwe nendamowinan (pronounced Mahn-ji-way nen-da-mow-in-ahn), a formally endorsed Anishinaabemowin name meaning “gathering of minds.”

=== Science Building ===
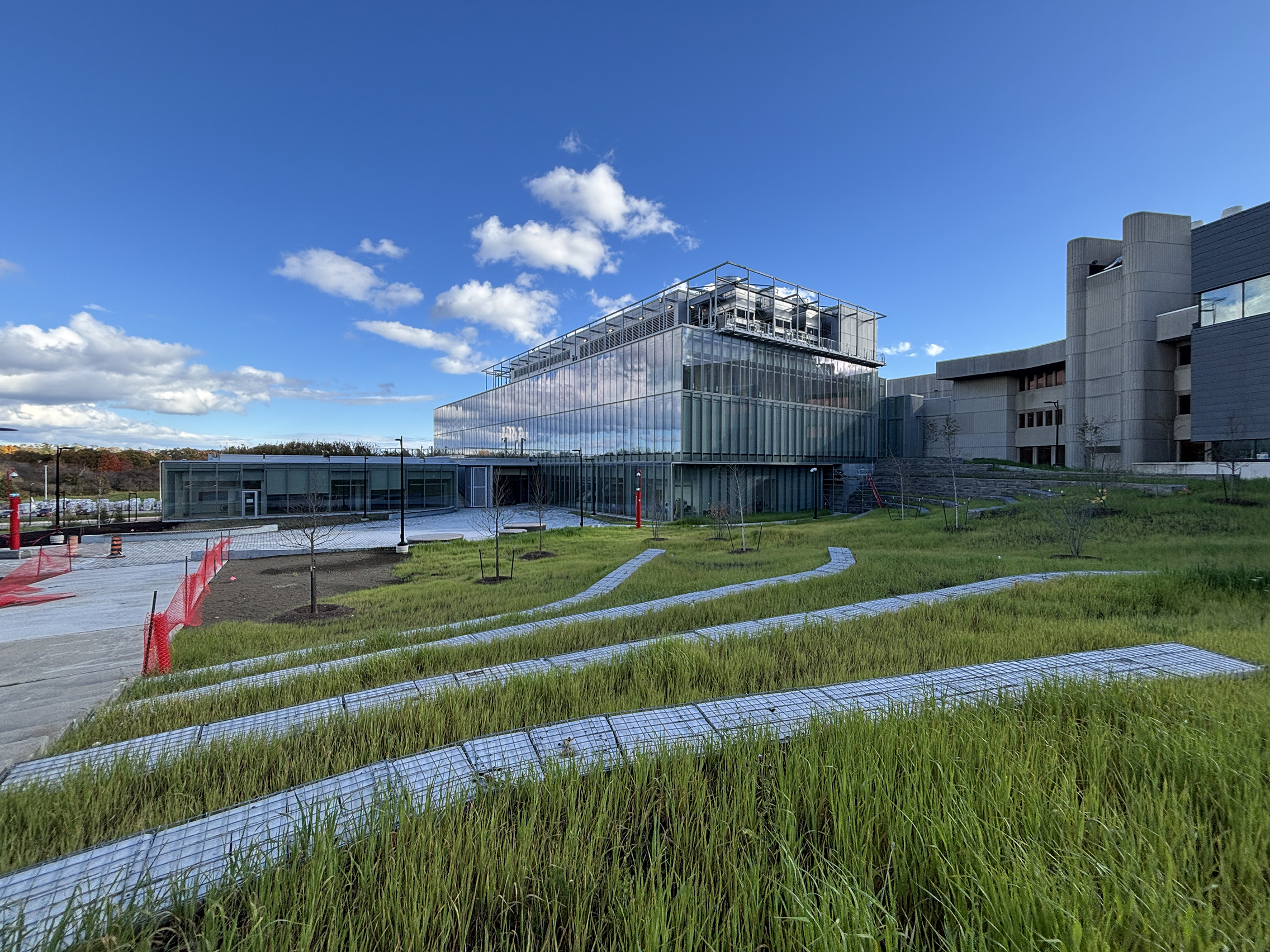
The Science Building, opened in 2024, home to the University of Toronto's first wet lab icubator

The Science Building, which officially opened in Fall 2024, features energy-efficient wet lab biological and chemical laboratory facilities. Designed to achieve LEED Gold certification, the building incorporates sustainable systems such as a geothermal heating and cooling system, a rooftop solar photovoltaic array, and a rainwater harvesting system. Spanning 15,550 square meters over four stories, it created new spaces for faculty and student offices, gathering and conference spaces, and a high-performance data centre. The facility is linked to the adjacent William G. Davis Building and aims to help reduce the campus's carbon footprint by 2030.

=== North Building ===
The North Building was the original educational building on the campus, formerly known as Erindale College. Construction for the North Building began in 1966. It was originally intended to be temporary and to be used for administrative purposes such as the registrar's office, but remained until 2015. Classes in the building began for the 1967 school year, with 155 students, 28 faculty, and 40 staff. Since then numerous additions and remodels were made. Before its demolition, the only part of the original structure that remained were the cafeteria and some classrooms on the first floor. The building was home to the Department of Humanities. Room capacities ranged from 48-person classrooms to a 200-person lecture hall and a cafe containing Coyote Jacks, Pita Pit, Tim Hortons and Mr. Sub vendors. The North Building was demolished in 2015, and replaced by Deerfield Hall and the six-storey Maanjiwe nendamowinan which opened in 2018.

== Governance and administration ==
The Mississauga campus operates under the University of Toronto Governing Council, which is the unicameral governing body of all campuses of the University of Toronto, established in 1972. On behalf of the Governing Council, the UTM Campus Council is the main authority for matters specific to the Mississauga campus. The Council, established on July 1, 2013, consists of 28 members: half of which are internal members, including staff, students and faculty, and half are external, such as alumni and community members. The council has three standing committees: the Academic Affairs Committee, Campus Affairs Committee, and Campus Council Agenda Committee.

Head administrative officers at the University of Toronto Mississauga include the campus principal, who also serves as a vice-president of the University of Toronto, and the dean, who is also the campus's vice-principal (academic).

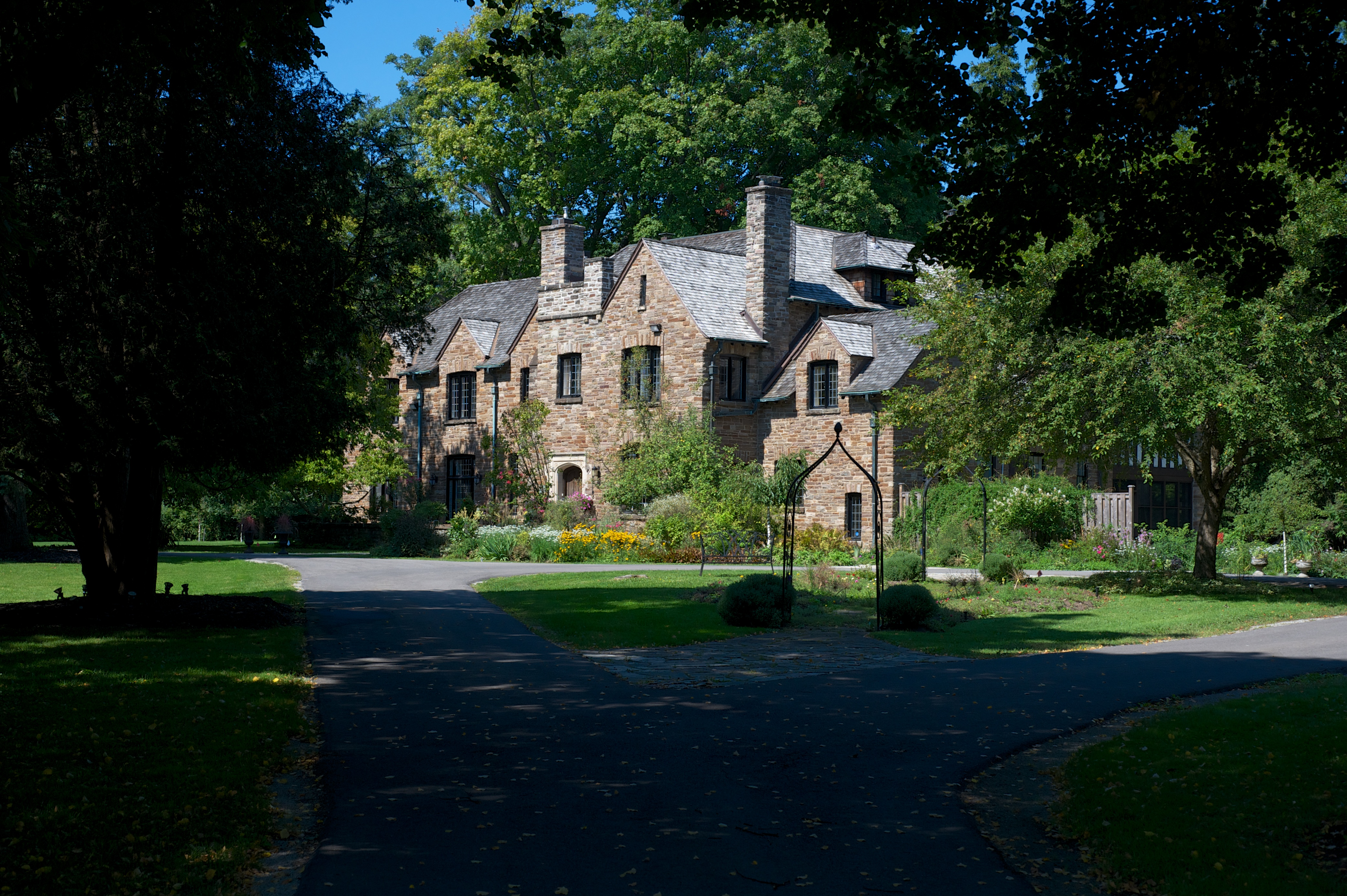
Lislehurst is the official residence of the campus principal

The principal is the executive head of the Mississauga campus, and reports directly to the president of the University of Toronto. The role was expanded to also include vice-presidential responsibilities when the University of Toronto Mississauga became a fully-fledged academic division in 2003. The vice-president and principal (VP-principal) serves as the only ex-officio voting member of the UTM Campus Council, along with the secretary of the Governing Council who is an ex officio, non-voting member. The administrative offices of both the campus VP-principal and dean are located in the William G. Davis Building. Lislehurst is the principal's traditional residence, a historic building on the north end of the campus. The University of Toronto Mississauga's current principal is Alexandra Gillespie, a professor in the Department of English and Drama who previously served as the department chair. Her term began on July 1, 2020 and was renewed in 2025, set to last until December 31, 2027.

Deans of Erindale College

- John S. Colman (1966–1969)
- E. A. (Peter) Robinson (1969–1976)

Deans of the University of Toronto Mississauga

- Cheryl Misak (2003–2005; 2007)
- Charles Jones (acting 2005–2007)
- Gage Averill (2007–2010)
- Amy Mullin (interim 2010–2011; 2011–2015)
- Amrita Daniere (2016–2021; acting 2022–2023)
- Angela Lange (acting 2018)
- Rhonda McEwen (2021–2022)
- Nicholas Rule (2023–2024)
- William Gough (interim 2024–2026; 2026–present)

== Academics ==
Exterior of the Hazel McCallion Academic Learning Centre

The University of Toronto Mississauga is an academic division of the University of Toronto, responsible for its own faculty, staff and undergraduate programs. Like the University of Toronto Scarborough, it consists of several of its own academic units which administer programs in arts, science, and business on its campus, similar to the role of the Faculty of Arts and Science on the St. George campus. U of T Mississauga offers more than 180 programs in 95 areas of study, leading to undergraduate degrees including a Honours Bachelor of Arts (HBA), Honours Bachelor of Science (HBSc), Bachelor of Commerce (BCom), and Bachelor of Business Administration (BBA). Undergraduate students are admitted to one of several broad admission categories rather than a specific program, and complete their first year undeclared, before applying to their chosen program of study (known as a "POSt") before beginning their second year. Undergraduate students are able to take a limited number of courses at any of the three University of Toronto campuses. Programs unique to U of T Mississauga include the oldest forensic science program in Canada and a biomedical communications program, the only of its kind in the country. It also hosts a joint program in partnership with Sheridan College known as Art and Art History, leading to both a university degree from the University of Toronto and a college diploma from Sheridan. The campus offers a game studies minor that explores video games as cultural, artistic, and technological forms. Developed by the Department of English and Drama in partnership with the Institute of Communication, Culture, Information and Technology (ICCIT), the program focuses on the analysis, history, theory, and design of games, emphasizing their narrative potential. This initiative was created by the acquisition of the Syd Bolton Collection, Canada's largest video game archive, featuring over 14,000 games and numerous gaming consoles and literature.

Most University of Toronto divisions operate primarily at St. George, however the Temerty Faculty of Medicine and Lawrence Bloomberg Faculty of Nursing also operate undergraduate programs on the Mississauga campus, since 2011 and 2026 respectively.

Graduate education at all three campuses is overseen by the University of Toronto's singular School of Graduate Studies, and several tri-campus graduate programs are available at the Mississauga campus. Divisions offering such programs include:

- Faculty of Applied Science and Engineering
- Faculty of Arts and Science
- Faculty of Information
- Rotman School of Management
- Ontario Institute for Studies in Education

=== Departments and units ===
U of T Mississauga comprises several academic units, including 15 departments and four institutes, which administer undergraduate programs on the Mississauga campus. The Institute for Management and Innovation (IMI) primarily operates graduate programs through the School of Graduate Studies. Below is a list of all units:

- Department of Anthropology
- Department of Biology
- Department of Chemical and Physical Sciences
- Institute of Communication, Culture, Information and Technology
- Department of Economics
- Department of English and Drama
- Institute of Forensic Sciences
- Department of Geography, Geomatics and Environment
- Department of Historical Studies
- Department of Language Studies
- Institute for Management and Innovation
- Department of Management
- Department of Mathematical and Computational Sciences
- Department of Philosophy
- Department of Political Science
- Professional Accounting Centre
- Professional Graduate Programs Centre
- Department of Psychological and Brain Sciences
- Department of Sociology
- Centre for South Asian Critical Humanities
- Institute for the Study of University Pedagogy
- Centre for Urban Environments
- Department of Visual Studies
- Environment Programs
- Women and Gender Studies Program

==== Co-op Internship Program ====
In 2024, U of T Mississauga launched the University of Toronto Mississauga Co-op Internship Program (UTMCIP) across six of its academic departments, allowing students in select programs to enrol in a stream which includes a 12- or 16-month internship. UTMCIP replaces its former Professional Experience Year (PEY) program.

=== Library ===
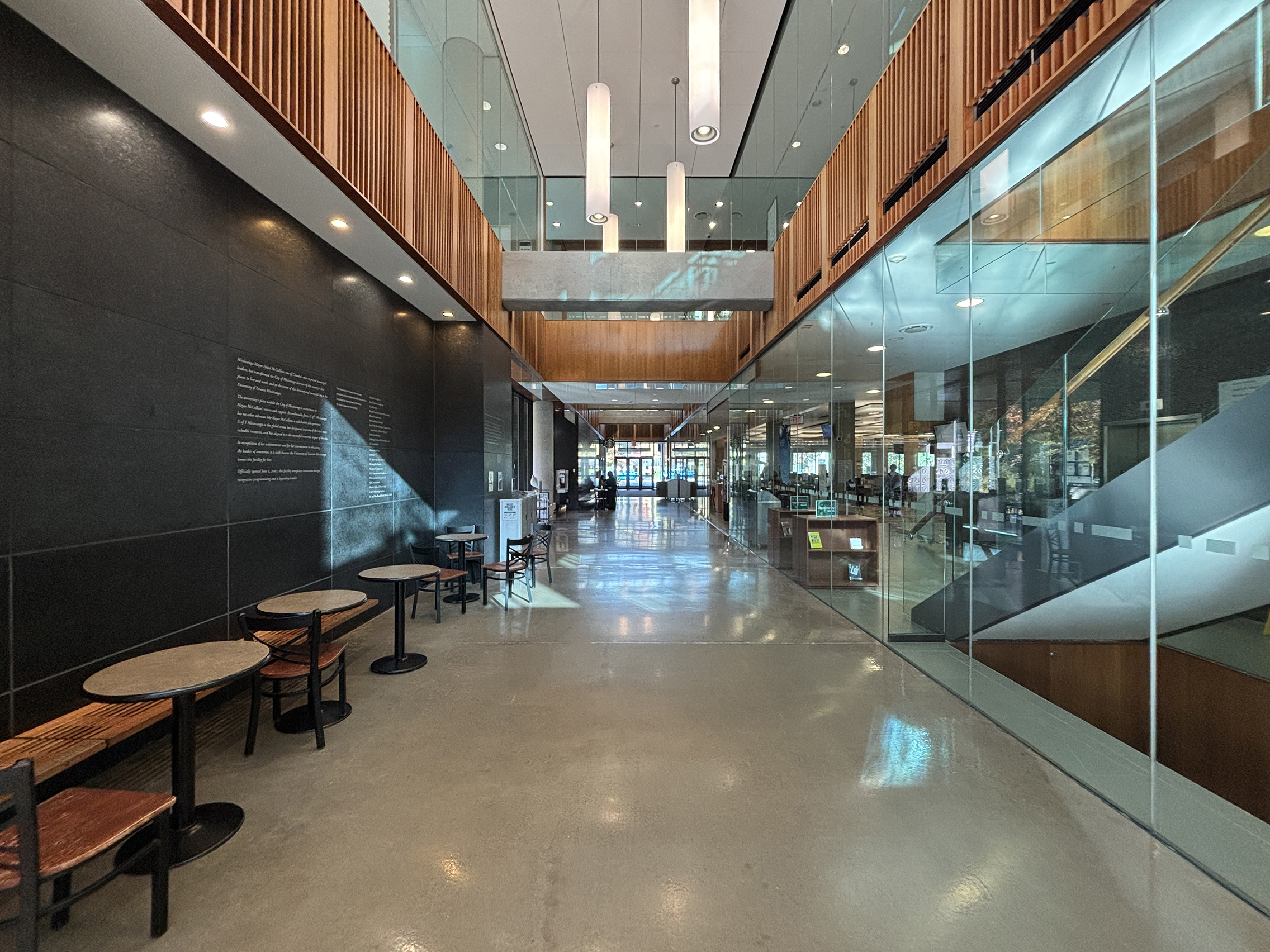
Interior of the Hazel McCallion Academic Learning Centre and Library

The campus library is the University of Toronto Mississauga Library, located in the Hazel McCallion Academic Learning Centre. Its current location opened on October 8, 2006. The building, designed by Shore Tilbe Irwin + Partners and named after former Mississauga mayor Hazel McCallion, consists of four floors with a mixture of group study tables, study rooms, and individual silent study space. Prior to the building's construction, a campus library has existed since its founding in 1967, variously located in North Building and the William G. Davis Building.

=== Research ===
The Mississauga campus is the site of research in a broad range of fields including paleontology, biology, pedagogy, robotics, and machine learning. It is home to several of the University of Toronto's research centres including:

- The Centre for Nonlinear Analysis and Modeling (CNAM) – a centre which studies the interdisciplinary field of nonlinear systems.
- The Continuum Robotics Lab – a hub for research on continuum robotics directed by Jessica Burgner-Kahrs.
- The Data Sciences Institute – a tri-campus initiative where Mississauga researchers focus on responsible use of data science.
- ICUBE – part of the University of Toronto Innovation network, an incubator for entrepreneurship and early-stage start-ups.
- The Institute for the Study of University Pedagogy (ISUP) – a centre for research on teaching and learning.
- The Reisz Lab – a research group focusing on vertebrate paleontology.
- SpinUP – part of the University of Toronto Innovation network and the University of Toronto's first wet lab incubator.

=== Robert Gillespie Academic Skills Centre ===
The Robert Gillespie Academic Skills Centre (RGASC) is a hub for learning and teaching on campus, closely associated with the Institute for the Study of University Pedagogy. Founded by Cleo Boyd in the summer of 1996 as the Academic Skills Centre, it was renamed in 2005 for its principal benefactor Robert Gillespie, an engineer and former chief executive officer of General Electric Canada. The RGASC is located on the third floor of Maanjiwe nendamowinan, and offers workshops, facilitated study groups, and skill-development appointments for all University of Toronto students, specifically in writing, math and numeracy, and study skills.

== Student life ==
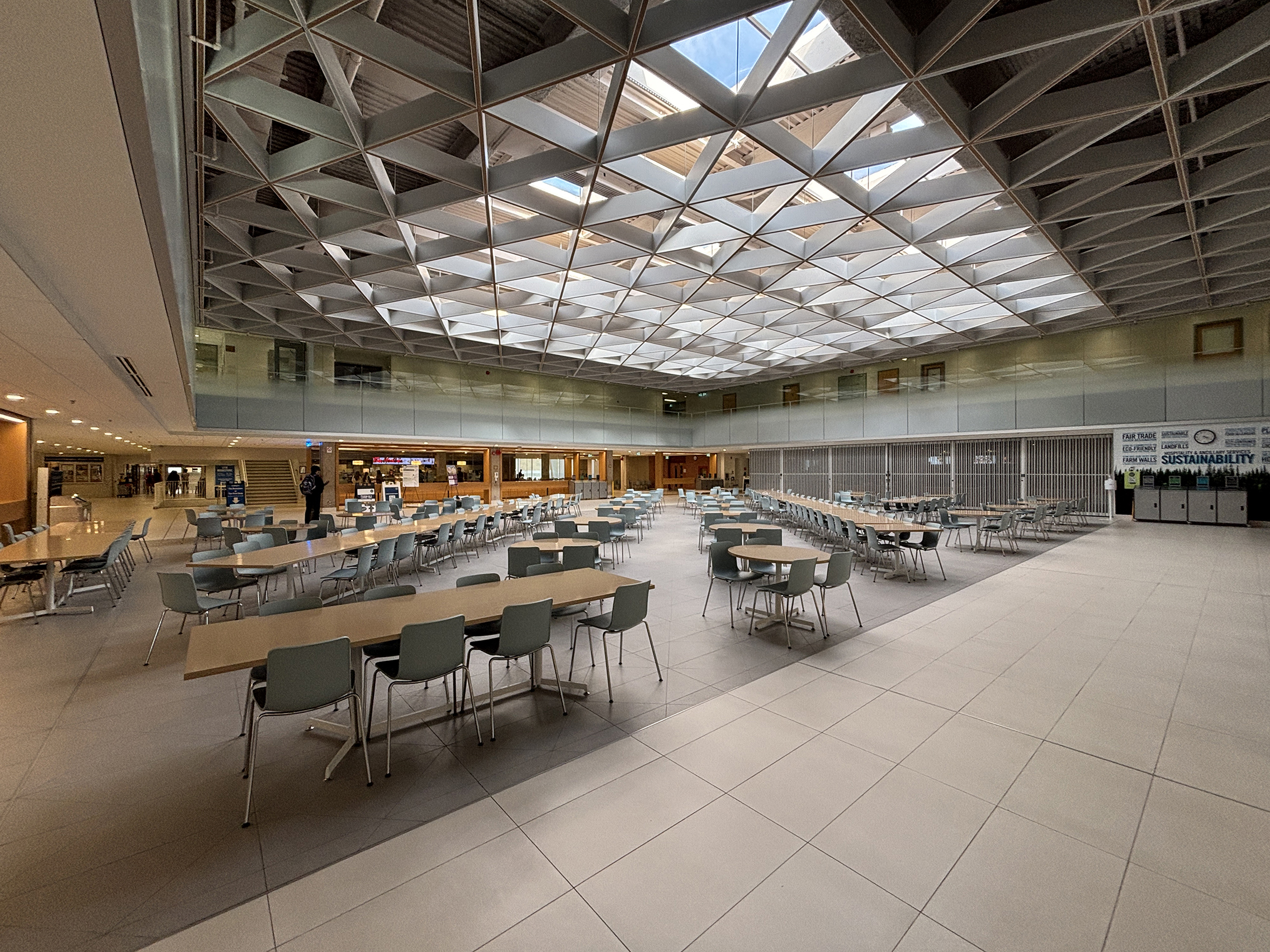
William G. Davis Building Meeting Place

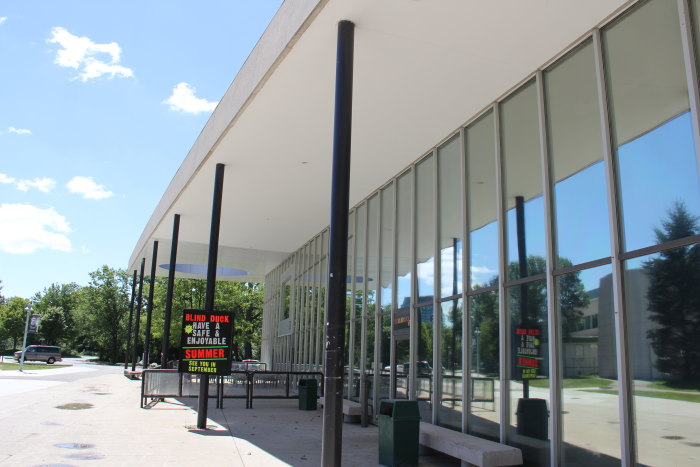
A patio for the Blind Duck pub at the Student Centre

Campus dining and lounge spaces on campus include the Student Centre, two Starbucks locations in the Library and Deerfield Hall, a Second Cup Cafe location in the Kaneff Centre, the Davis Building's Meeting Place and Food Court, Oscar Peterson Hall's Colman Commons, CCT's Circuit Cafe, and the IB Court dining and lounge area, among others. There are also various outdoor patio and seating areas.

The Student Centre offers a variety of events and programs available to students. The Blind Duck pub, located in the Student Centre, is popular eating spot on campus where students and staff are able to socialize. The Blind Duck also hosts many student events including the First Pub, Last Pub, and Halloween Pub where various artists such as Shawn Desman and Mia Martina have performed. Students can find on-campus employment opportunities at The Blind Duck as it is owned and operated by the University of Toronto Mississauga Students' Union (UTMSU). Events offered to students include movie nights held every Monday evening, occasional guest speakers, and a variety of other events run by the student centre. The student centre also houses other student organizations including the campus newspaper, radio station, student union, and numerous other student societies.

In 2024, the university opened the newly renovated Student Services Hub on the main floor of the William G. Davis Building. This space serves as a "first stop" for students seeking resources and support, uniting several essential services, including the Career Centre, Accessibility Services, and the International Education Centre. The Hub features a central service desk, an expanded career exploration resource area, and various workshops and meetings spaces.

The campus is home to CFRE-FM, broadcasting twenty-four hours a day at 91.9FM out of the Student Centre. With a focus on Canadian and independent music, students and community members are encouraged to apply for a show, as no experience is required. There is also a student newspaper, The Medium.

The main practice facility of the Toronto Argonauts professional football team was located on the campus until 2014.

Students who contribute much to student life are recognized through various awards including the University of Toronto Student Leadership Awards (UTSLA) and the University of Toronto Mississauga Student Leadership Awards. Students can also receive awards for their involvement and academic excellence through individual academic departments, such as the Department of Political Science's Most Promising Theory Student award. In addition, the Centre for Student Engagement and UTMSU reward successful student groups by hosting yearly award ceremonies and galas for student clubs and societies that have excelled throughout an academic year.

=== Athletics ===
The Recreation, Athletics and Wellness Centre (RAWC), attached to the Davis Building, is the home of campus athletics. It hosts the Campus Rec Intramural Program and supplies sports equipment for drop-ins with a student card or membership. These sports include basketball, soccer, volleyball, table tennis, and racquet sports. In addition to these sports, the centre offers organized classes in dance, martial arts, yoga, and swimming. The facility has two gymnasiums, one North American-sized squash court, two international-sized squash courts, one pool with a whirlpool on deck, and a fitness and training centre, among other studios and multipurpose rooms. The RAWC hosts frequent drop-ins for students to play sports casually.

==== Varsity sports ====
All three University of Toronto campuses, including Mississauga, are represented by the Toronto Varsity Blues in the Ontario University Athletics (OUA) division of U Sports.

The UTM Eagles had a separate intercollegiate sports program in the Ontario Colleges Athletic Association (OCAA) from 2014–2021, however it was suspended during the COVID-19 pandemic citing low participation.

==== Intramural and recreational sports ====
The University of Toronto Tri-Campus League is an intramural sports tournament where the university's three campuses compete in various sports. The Mississauga campus is represented by the UTM Eagles, which participate in ice hockey, basketball, indoor and outdoor soccer, volleyball, and ultimate frisbee.

In addition to Tri-Campus sports, the campus is affiliated with the Canadian Collegiate Athletic Association through the Ontario Colleges Athletic Association (OCAA). The Eagles participate in Ontario Collegiate Recreation (OCR), an extramural sporting program hosted by the OCAA.

=== Residence ===
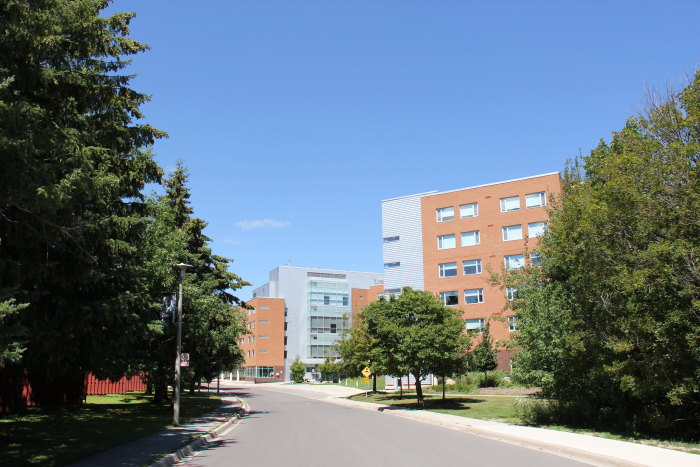
Oscar Peterson Hall, the largest student residence hall on the campus

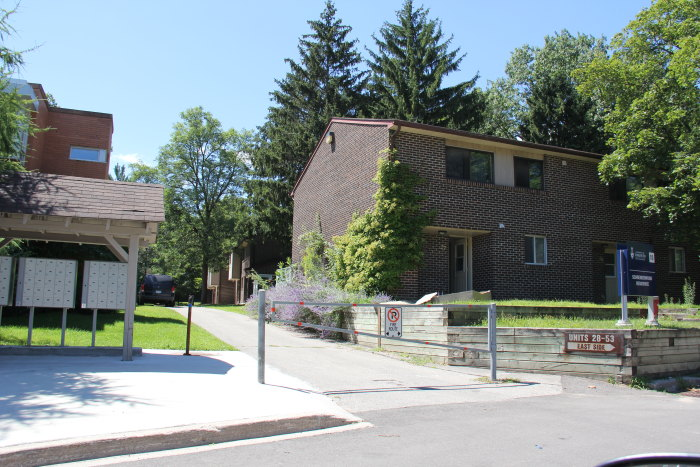
A residence block on campus

The Mississauga campus houses approximately 2,000 students in residence and guarantees housing to those in first year. Undergraduate residences include Oscar Peterson Hall (OPH), Roy Ivor Hall, Erindale Hall, McLuhan Court, Putnam Place, Leacock Lane, MaGrath Valley, Schreiberwood, and the New Residence Building. First-year residence includes OPH, McLuhan Court, Roy Ivor Hall, Erindale Hall, MaGrath Valley, and Schreiberwood. Upper-year housing includes Putnam Place and Leacock Lane.

OPH is a traditional-style residence with single rooms and shared bathrooms. Colman Commons, located in OPH, is the main dining facility for students living on residence. Putnam Place and Leacock Lane are townhouse-style residences with four single rooms, one bathroom, a living room and a kitchen per house. Roy Ivor Hall and Erindale Hall are first-year apartment suites with four bedrooms, two bathrooms, a living room and kitchen per suite. Each bedroom in Erindale hall is a double bedroom while each bedroom in Roy Ivor hall is a single bedroom. Each residence is fully equipped with laundry machines and common lounges.

The university held a groundbreaking ceremony for a new student residence on campus scheduled to open in 2026. Located next to Oscar Peterson Hall, this residence will be the Mississauga campus's first new housing facility since 2007 and is part of a tri-campus initiative to add 1,446 new student housing spaces. The building will feature 115 single bedrooms, 135 double bedrooms, and 15 rooms for support staff, totaling 400 beds and covering 116,560 square feet and six stories. It will include study spaces, lounges, laundry facilities, and areas for social programs, increasing the campus's housing capacity to approximately 1,900 students. Designed by Montgomery Sisam Architects and Christensen & Co., the residence is harmonized with the campus's natural ravine setting, featuring wood and stone cladding at the podium and copper-toned aluminum on upper levels. It aims for LEED Silver certification, incorporating eco-friendly systems such as solar panels and water-efficient fixtures, and aligns with several United Nations Sustainable Development Goals (SDGs). This project is part of the University of Toronto Mississauga's 2021 Campus Master Plan, which includes plans for enhanced outdoor spaces and improved cycling infrastructure.

=== Theatre ===
The Erindale Studio Theatre is a black box theatre with an audience capacity of up to 85 people, depending on the stage configuration. The building itself was formerly a bus garage and science lab, but was converted into a theatre in 1993. It has a modern lighting and audio system, as well as a full carpentry shop, costume shop, box office and painting facilities.

Theatre Erindale is a theatre production company at the university for students in the joint Theatre and Drama Studies program with Sheridan College. The company presents a season of five plays in the Erindale Studio Theatre. These plays include classics, modern pieces and a yearly collective developed by the third year class. Several shows have been included in the Ontario Arts Review Top 10 List since 2005. The season's shows are also supported by students of the Technical Production program at Sheridan College who do placements in stage management, lighting operation, and sound operation.

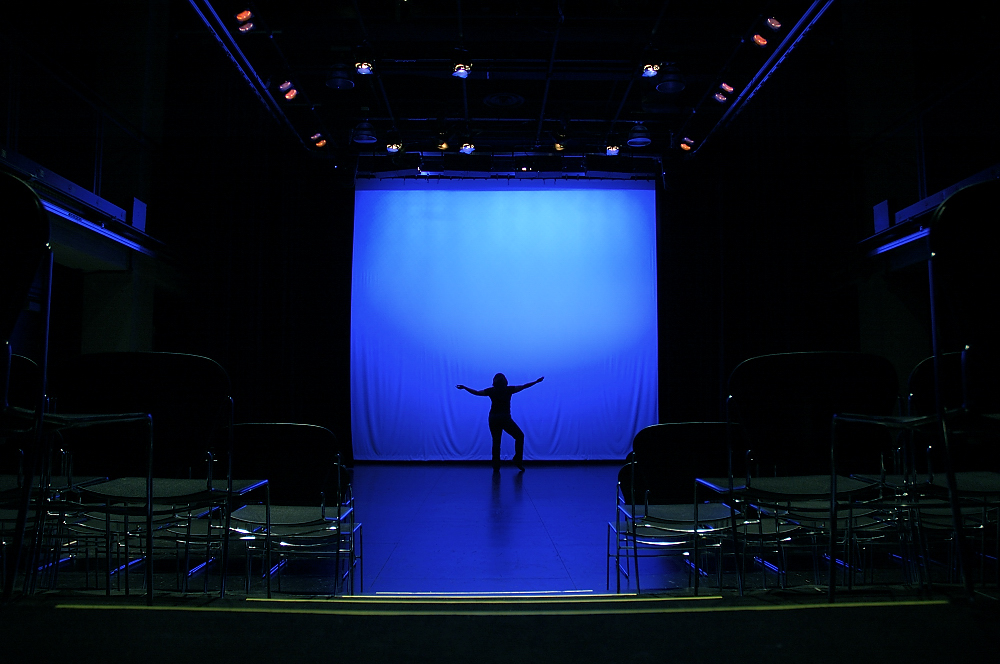
MiST Theatre in the CCT Building

The Multimedia Studio Theatre (MiST) is a modern, flexible theatre space used as a venue for drama lectures, performances by touring companies, independent student productions, Theatre Erindale's annual Beck Festival of student-directed performances, and the drama club's annual production. The Blackwood Gallery on campus has used MiST on several occasions for receptions, conferences, and art exhibits. The theatre is contained in the Communication, Culture and Technology Building (CCT) and designed by Saucier + Perrotte Architectes.

=== Blackwood Gallery ===
The Blackwood is an art centre at U of T Mississauga campus which operates two main campus art exhibits: the Blackwood Gallery, located in the Kaneff Centre/Innovation Complex, and the E-Gallery, located in the Communication, Culture and Technology Building (CCT). The Blackwood collects, maintains, preserves, and exhibits over 450 works of the University of Toronto Mississauga's permanent collection, and exhibits student work from the Art & Art History joint program with Sheridan College. It also maintains numerous light box art exhibits around the campus. Mississauga's first public art gallery was established on campus in 1969 as the Erindale College Art Gallery. It was renamed in 1992 as The Blackwood Gallery in honour of Canadian artist David Blackwood who was artist-in-residence at Erindale College from 1967 to 1973.

=== Students' unions ===
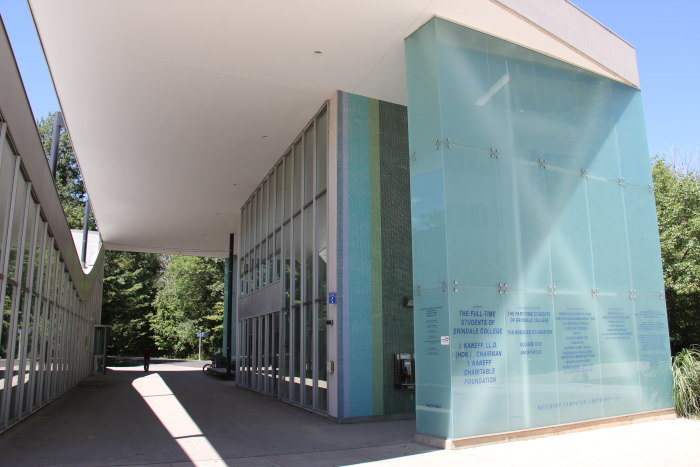
Part of the campus's Student Centre

The University of Toronto Mississauga Students' Union (UTMSU) represents the interests of full-time undergraduate students registered at the Mississauga campus. Part-time undergrads at all three campuses, including Mississauga, are represented by the Association of Part-time Undergraduate Students at the University of Toronto (APUS). Likewise, the tri-campus University of Toronto Graduate Students' Union (UTGSU) is the official representative body for graduate students.

At the Mississauga campus, almost every academic department has an academic society. These societies are student-led, faculty-endorsed organizations that focus on a specific program area. Students are able to work with others who are enrolled in the same program where they can discuss and participate in a variety of academic goals. A wide variety of UTMSU-sponsored clubs also exist on campus, representing students in a range of hobbies, interests, religions and cultures.

The UTMSU organizes frosh week, an event held annually aimed at welcoming first year students into the university. Hosting approximately 1,200 students every year, frosh week offers a variety of events and activities meant to introduce students to university life and allow first year students to meet other incoming students. Frosh week events are held both on and off the campus. Featured at the 2011 frosh week Shawn Desman performed for students at The Blind Duck. Other frosh week activities included off campus visits to Medieval Times, Canada's Wonderland and the St. George campus.

=== Transportation ===
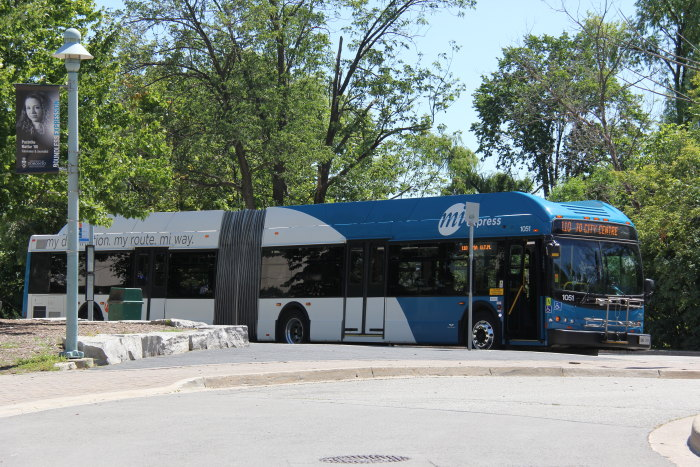
A MiWay bus at the University of Toronto Mississauga

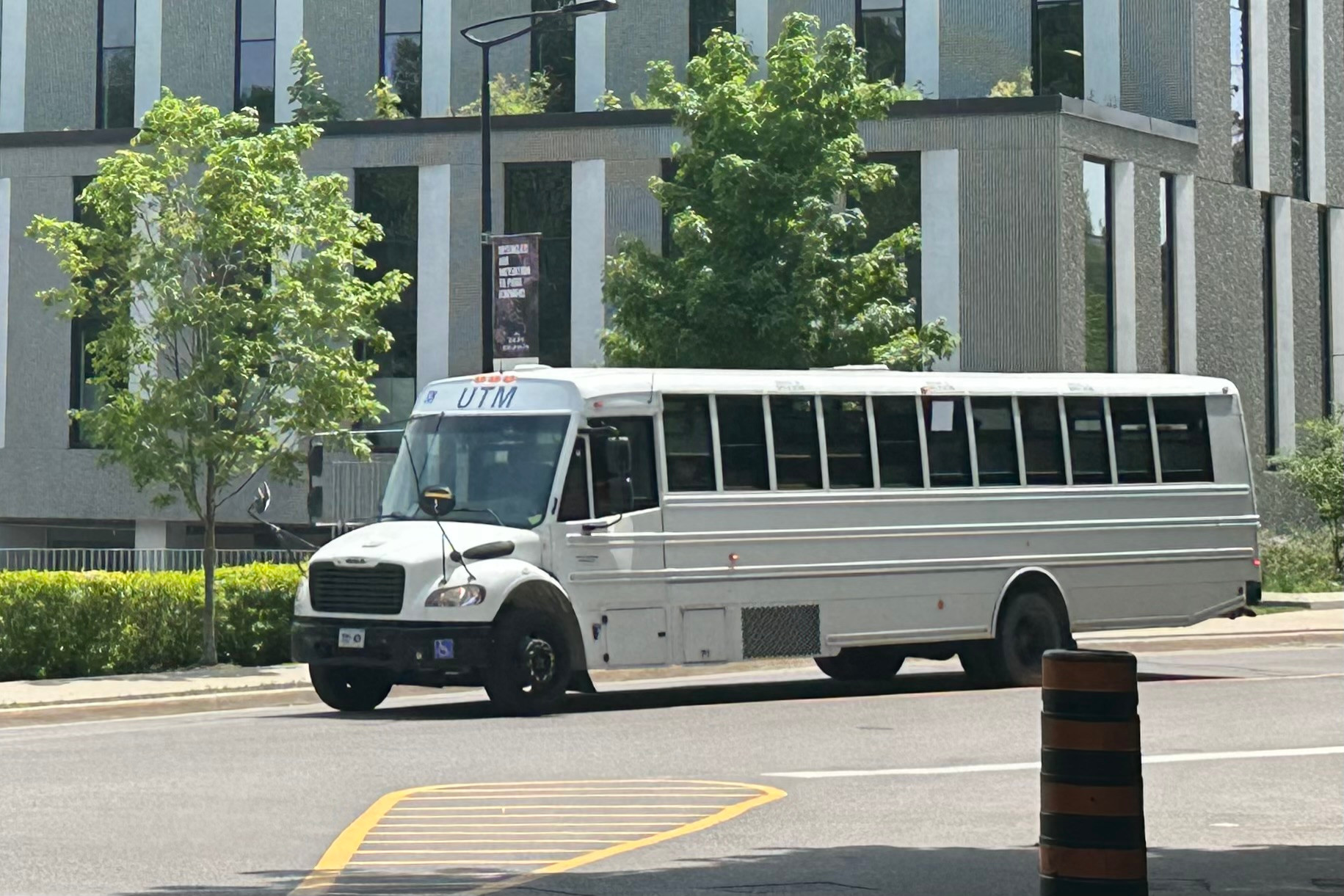
A campus shuttle bus by Maanjiwe nendamowinan

The campus is a hub for MiWay busses operated by the City of Mississauga. The University of Toronto Mississauga bus terminal is a stop on several local and express MiWay routes and one express Brampton Transit route.

The University of Toronto Mississauga operates a shuttle bus service for students to travel to and from the St. George campus or Sheridan College's Trafalgar campus. The service is free for University of Toronto students registered at the Mississauga campus, and available to other riders for a fare. In 2012–13, the service had an annual ridership of approximately 340,000 people, with an average monthly ridership of about 25,000 in 2019.

Some form of shuttle bus service has existed between the University of Toronto's Mississauga and St. George campuses since before 1980. Before 1990, a similar service existed between the St. George and Scarborough campuses, however it was cancelled that year citing low ridership and high costs. Due to City of Toronto by-laws, the university would not be permitted to return service to a Scarborough–St. George shuttle since the amalgamation of Toronto, as the Toronto Transit Commission (TTC) is the exclusive and sole provider of public transportation services in the city. The Mississauga-St. George shuttle bus is unaffected by the rule because it does not run entirely within city limits, as it operates across transit jurisdictions of the TTC and MiWay.

The shuttle bus fleet consists of white school bus-style vehicles under a lease. In 2017, the fleet was replaced by new buses equipped with WiFi capabilities and shock-proof technology.

=== Demographics ===
Student Demographics (UTM, 2024–25)
	Undergraduate	Graduate
Men	45.5%	34.1%
Women	51.7%	64.0%
Other gender or unreported	2.8%	1.9%
Canadian student	74.3%	73.7%
International student	25.7%	26.3%

The Mississauga campus comprises 17 per cent of the University of Toronto's student enrolment as a whole, with about a quarter as many students as the St. George campus. The Mississauga campus gender ratio is more balanced than St. George at the undergraduate level, however there is a notably higher proportion of women enrolled at the graduate level. Mississauga also has the smallest proportion of international students of the three campuses with 25.7 per cent, as opposed to 29.0 per cent at St. George and 30.7 per cent at the Scarborough campus.

== Notable alumni and faculty ==
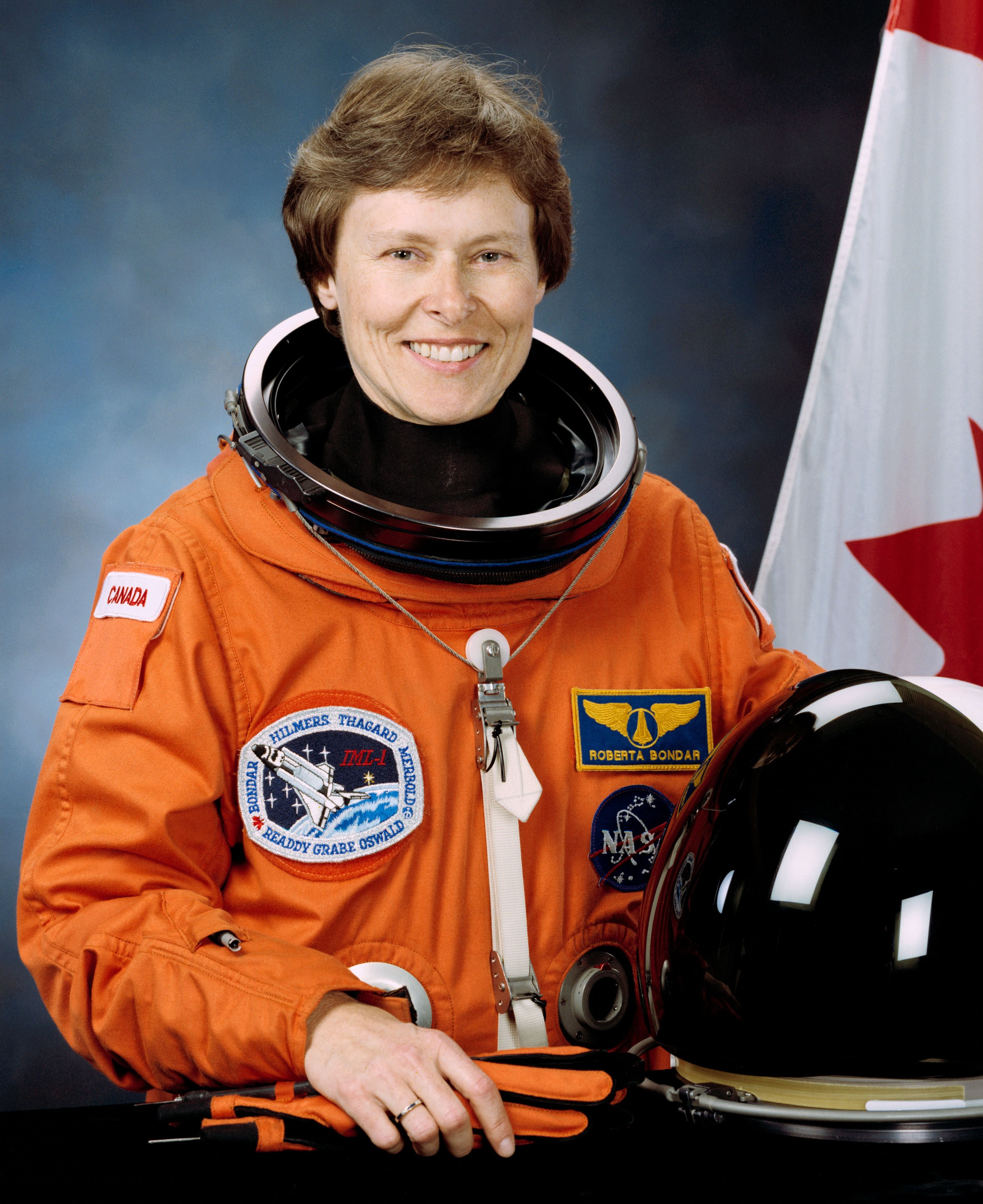
Roberta Bondar, neurologist and astronaut, first Canadian woman in space

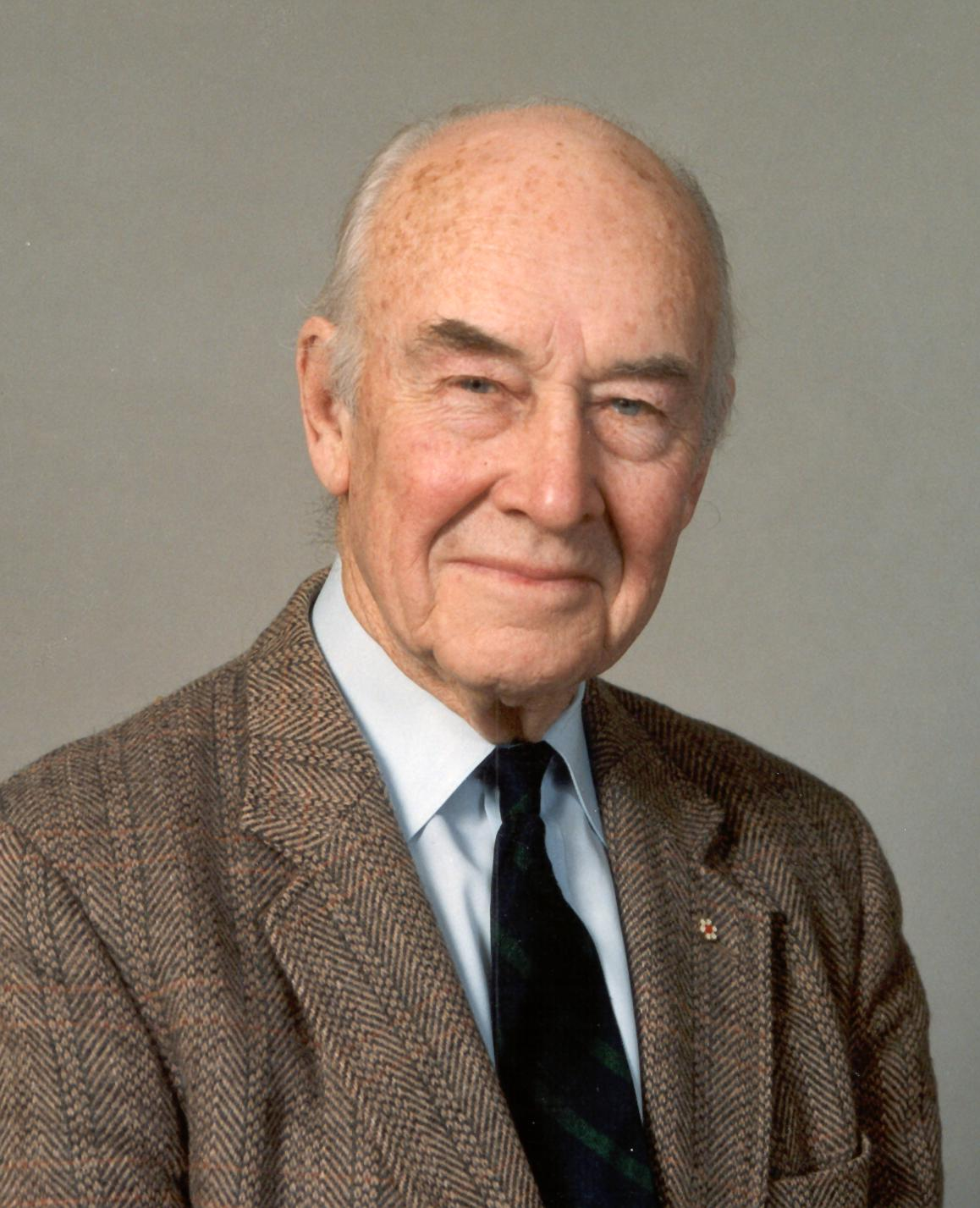
John Tuzo Wilson, geophysicist and geologist

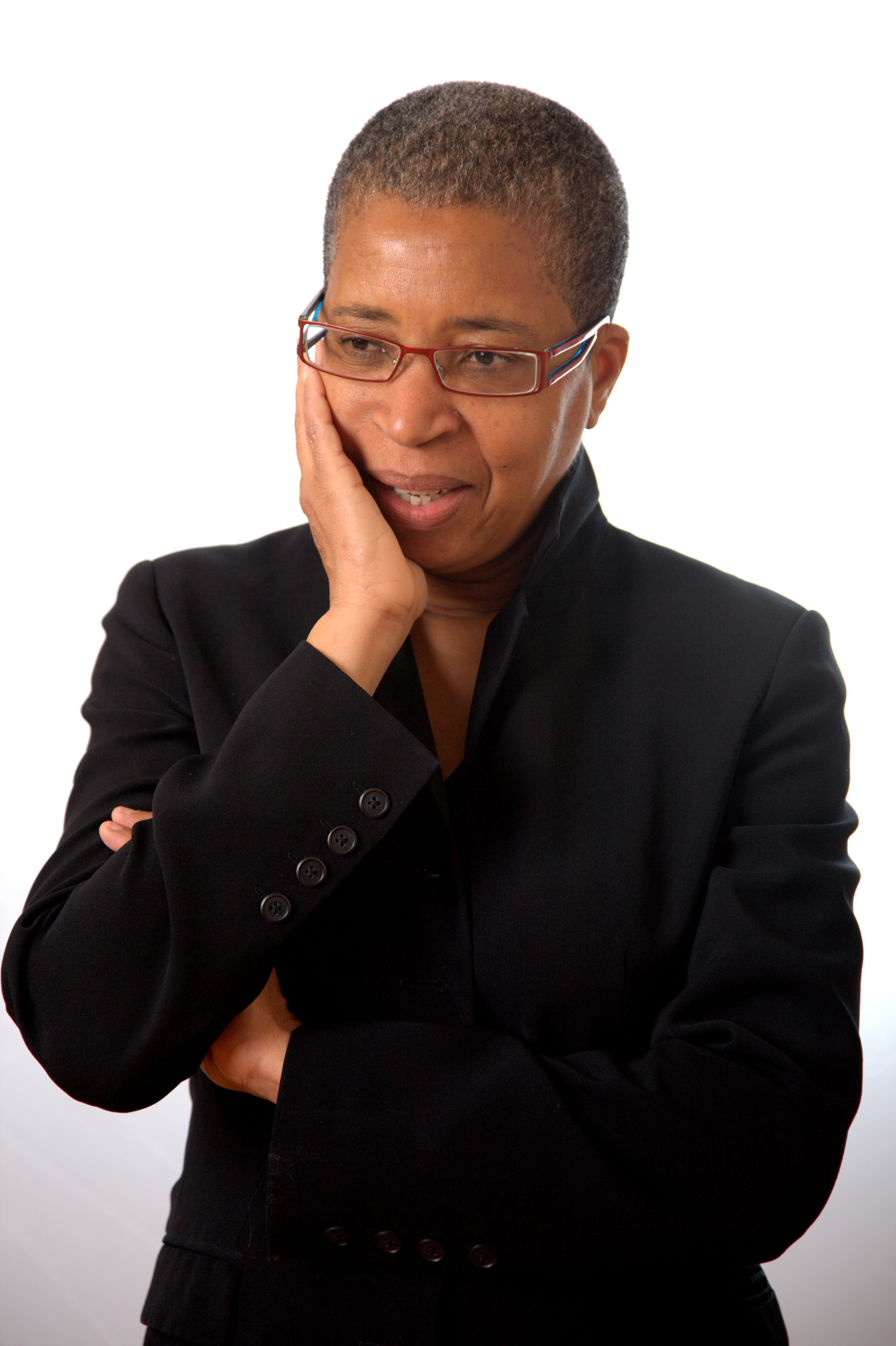
Dionne Brand, poet, novelist and community activist

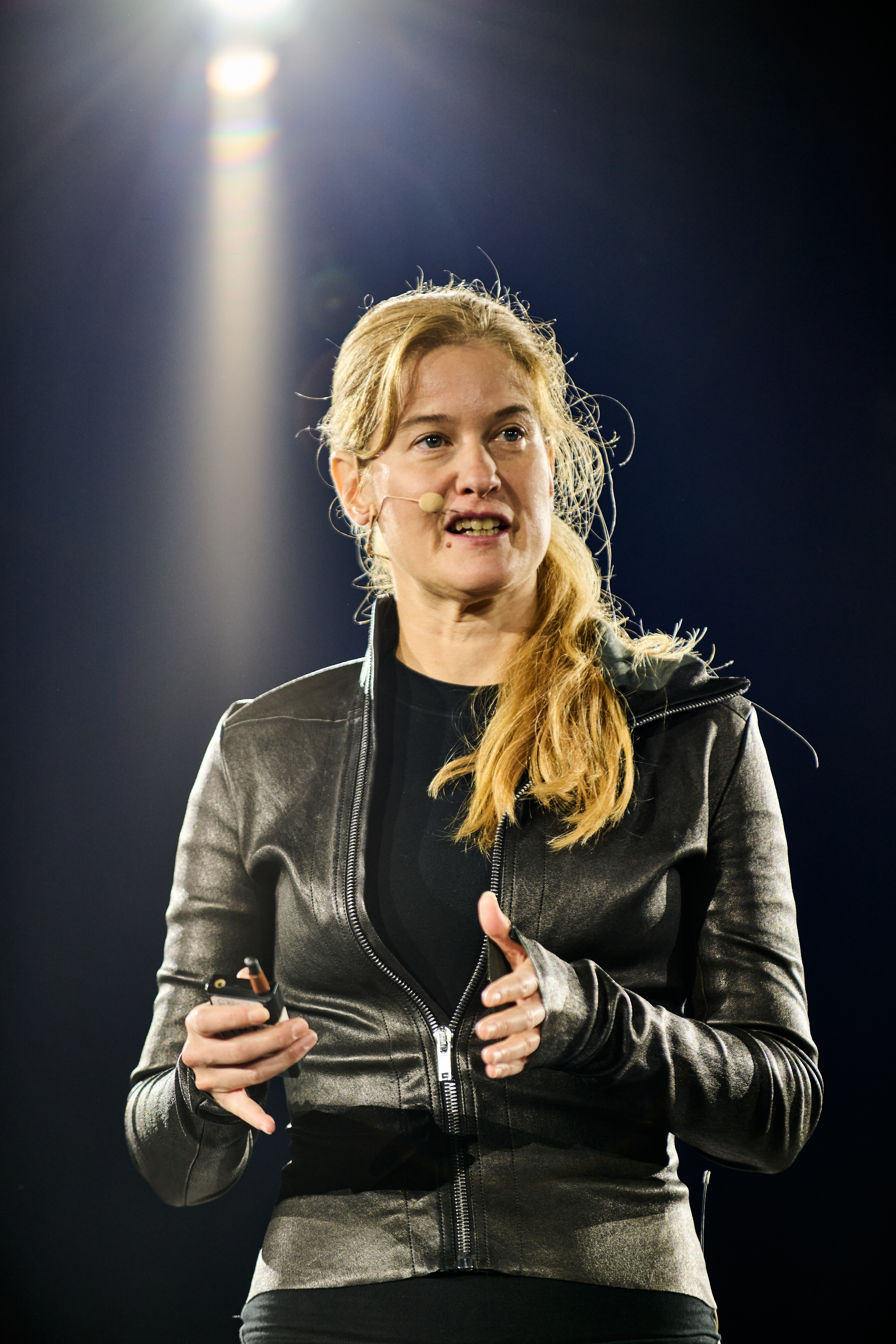
Sanja Fidler, artificial intelligence researcher and co-founder of the Vector Institute

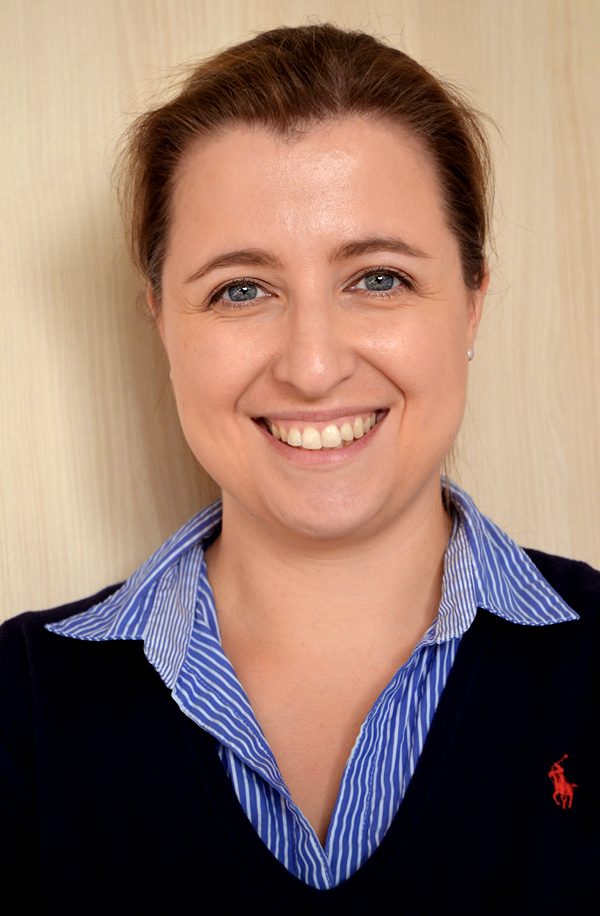
Jessica Burgner-Kahrs, roboticist and director of the Continuum Robotics Laboratory
- Fares Al Soud – Member of Parliament for Mississauga Centre
- Sidney Aster – professor of historical studies
- Peter William Ball – botanist and professor
- Alicia Brown – two-time Olympian (track)
- Jessica Burgner-Kahrs – associate professor of computer science and roboticist, director of the Continuum Robotics Lab
- Cody Caetano – author
- Claire Carver-Dias – Olympic synchronized swimmer, writer
- Fergus I. M. Craik – professor of psychology and cognitive psychologist known for his research on levels of processing in memory
- André Dae Kim – actor, Degrassi: The Next Generation, Vampire Academy
- Bruce Dowbiggin – journalist
- Sanja Fidler – associate professor of computer science, vice-president of AI research at Nvidia, co-founder of the Vector Institute
- Alison Fleming – neuroscientist and professor
- Ruslan Gaziev – competitive swimmer and 2020 Olympian
- Robert Gerlai – behavioural neuroscientist and distinguished professor of psychology
- Alexandra Gillespie – 10th principal, professor of English and historian specializing in manuscript studies, medieval literature, and global book history
- Michael Glanzberg – professor of philosophy
- Lesley Hampton – fashion designer
- Amanda E. Hargrove – professor of medicinal chemistry, former editor-in-chief of Medicinal Research Reviews
- Marc T. J. Johnson – professor of biology and Canada Research Chair for Urban Environmental Science
- Yael Karshon – professor of mathematics
- Konstantin Khanin – professor of mathematics
- Vikas Kohli – musician and music producer
- Harold Sonny Ladoo – novelist, author of No Pain Like This Body (1972)
- Yue Li – professor of accounting
- Yevgeny Liokumovich – professor of mathematics
- Michael Lynch – professor, poet, journalist, and activist; pioneer of queer studies in Canadian academia
- Tina Malti – distinguished professor of child development
- Rhonda McEwen – professor (ICCIT) and researcher, former dean, 14th president and vice-chancellor of Victoria University, Toronto
- Richie Mehta – film director and writer
- Cheryl Misak – former dean and acting principal
- Lindsey Middleton – actor
- Desmond Morton – 5th principal
- Morris Moscovitch – professor of psychology, Max and Gianna Glassman Chair in Neuropsychology and Aging and Professor of Psychology
- Emmy Murphy – professor of mathematics
- Jennifer Nagel – professor of philosophy and acting chair of the Department of Philosophy; former president of the Canadian Philosophical Association
- Philip Oreopoulos – distinguished professor of economics
- Nisha Pahuja – documentary filmmaker
- Charles Rackoff – professor of computer science
- Robert R. Reisz – professor of biology and paleontologist specializing in the study of early amniote and tetrapod evolution
- E. A. Robinson – 3rd principal, professor emeritus, chemist and researcher
- Mari Ruti – professor of philosophy
- Glenn Schellenberg – professor of psychology
- Luis A. Seco – professor of mathematics
- Wali Shah – singer-songwriter, educational speaker
- Zaib Shaikh – actor, writer and director
- Arul Shankar – professor of mathematics
- Metta Spencer – professor of sociology
- Sven Spengemann – politician, former Member of Parliament for Mississauga—Lakeshore
- Rosemary Sullivan – professor of English
- Mohamad Tavakoli-Targhi – professor of history and Near and Middle Eastern civilizations
- Sergio Tenenbaum – professor of philosophy
- Sandra Trehub – professor of psychology
- Bogomila Welsh-Ovcharov – professor of art history
- John Tuzo Wilson – 2nd principal, professor emeritus, geophysicist and geologist known for the discovery of tectonic plates, former director general of the Ontario Science Centre
- Rebecca Wittmann – professor of history
- David Yee – playwright and actor
- Daniel Zingaro – associate professor of computer science specializing in computer science education and online learning

== Insignias and other representations ==
During its time as a constituent college, Erindale College was granted its own coat of arms, however it fell out of common use in the early 2000s when the campus became a fully-fledged academic division and adopted its current name. Today, the University of Toronto Mississauga uses the university's coat of arms as its official logo and U of T Blue as its primary colour, consistent with all other divisions of the University of Toronto.

The Erindale College coat of arms includes the campus's Latin motto tantum nobis creditum, which means "so much has been entrusted to us."

Coat of arms of Erindale College
Notes Granted January 8, 1975, by the College of Arms Crest An oak tree fructed Or leaved and issuant from a tower proper, all rising from barry wavy Azure and Argent; Escutcheon Vert a chevron barry wavy Argent and Azure, all within a bordure embattled Or; Motto TANTUM NOBIS CREDITUM (Latin for "so much has been entrusted to us") Badge A pomme charged with a pile throughout Or overall a fess wavy Azure charged with a barrulet wavy Argent; Symbolism Arms: Green and yellow are the college's colours, referring to the natural setting of the campus. The chevron with the wavy blue and white stripes represents the bend in the Credit River next to which Erindale College (now the University of Toronto Mississauga) is located. The crenellated border alludes to the architecture of the main building of the campus. Crest: The oak tree is the crest of the University of Toronto. The tower and waves represent the campus buildings rising above the Credit River. Motto: This Latin phrase means "So much has been entrusted to us." The word Creditum is a punning reference to the Credit River.

== In popular culture ==
The University of Toronto Mississauga has been used as a filming location for movies such as Downsizing (2017), which features both the Hazel McCallion Academic Learning Centre and Communication, Culture and Technology (CCT) Building, and Disney Channel's Zombies 2 (2020) and Zombies 3 (2022). TV series filmed on the campus include The Handmaid's Tale (2017–2025), medical dramas Good Sam (2022) and Doc (2025– ), and The Boys (2019–2026), which filmed inside the Innovation Complex.

Most notably, the Mississauga campus was the primary filming location of The Boys' spin-off show Gen V (2023–2025). In the Amazon Prime Video series, the campus is used as its main setting, Godolkin University, a college for superpowered individuals. In its two seasons, Gen V predominantly featured campus buildings such as Maanjiwe nendamowinan, the Instructional Centre, Erindale Hall, and the Hazel McCallion Academic Learning Centre.

== See also ==
- University of Toronto Campus Safety
- Education in Mississauga
