= Daniel Zingaro =

Canadian academic

- Citizenship: Canadian

Academic background
- Education: McMaster University (BSc, MSc); Ontario Institute for Studies in Education (PhD)

Academic work
- Discipline: Computer Science, Scholarship of Teaching and Learning
- Institutions: University of Toronto Mississauga
- Website: www.danielzingaro.com

Daniel Zingaro is a professor at the University of Toronto Mississauga. His main areas of research are in evaluating Computer science education and online learning. He has co-authored over 80 articles in peer-reviewed journals and conferences; and also authored a textbook, "Invariants: a Generative Approach to Programming.

Born visually impaired, Zingaro completed B.Sc. and M.Sc. in computer science from McMaster University. He then received a Ph.D. from Ontario Institute for Studies in Education (OISE) at the University of Toronto in Computer Science Education. His master's thesis was about formalizing and proving properties of parsers. His doctoral thesis was titled " Evaluating Peer Instruction in First-year University Computer Science Courses". Daniel Zingaro designed accessible computer games and published work in Computers & Education, International Computing Education Research (ICER) conference, Computer Science Education, British Journal of Educational Technology, and Transactions on Computing Education.

== Selected publications ==
- Oztok, Murat; Zingaro, Daniel; Brett, Clare; Hewitt, Jim (2013). "Exploring asynchronous and synchronous tool use in online courses". Computers & Education. 60 (1): 87–94. doi:10.1016/j.compedu.2012.08.007. hdl:1807/35511. ISSN 0360-1315.
- Zingaro, Daniel; Porter, Leo (1 February 2014). "Peer Instruction in computing: The value of instructor intervention". Computers & Education. 71: 87–96. doi:10.1016/j.compedu.2013.09.015. ISSN 0360-1315.
- Atkinson, Daniel; Dookie, Lesley; Jagger, Susan; Jao, Limin; Kim, Vivien; Oztok, Murat; Romkey, Lisa; Tan, Michael; Thomas, Reed; Zingaro, Daniel (2014). "Introduction to the Special Issue on Graduate Student Innovations in Science, Mathematics, and Technology Education Research". Canadian Journal of Science, Mathematics and Technology Education. 14 (2): 109–119. Bibcode:2014CJSMT..14..109A. doi:10.1080/14926156.2014.903322. S2CID 144054590.
- Taylor, C.; Zingaro, D.; Porter, L.; Webb, K.C.; Lee, C.B.; Clancy, M. (2 October 2014). "Computer science concept inventories: past and future". Computer Science Education. 24 (4): 253–276. Bibcode:2014CSEd...24..253T. doi:10.1080/08993408.2014.970779. ISSN 0899-3408. S2CID 3402232.
- Porter, Leo; Zingaro, Daniel; Lister, Raymond (28 July 2014). Predicting student success using fine grain clicker data. ACM. pp. 51–58. doi:10.1145/2632320.2632354. ISBN 9781450327558. S2CID 10875262.
- Zingaro, Daniel (5 March 2014). "Peer instruction contributes to self-efficacy in CS1". Proceedings of the 45th ACM technical symposium on Computer science education. pp. 373–378. doi:10.1145/2538862.2538878. ISBN 978-1-4503-2605-6. S2CID 1752471.
- Zingaro, Daniel; Makos, Alexandra; Sharmin, Sadia; Wang, Lindsay; Despres-Bedward, Antoine; Oztok, Murat (20 June 2017). Student Moderators in Asynchronous Online Discussion: Scaffolding Their Questions. pp. 198–202. ISBN 978-1-939797-29-2.
- Zingaro, Daniel (2015). "Examining Interest and Grades in Computer Science 1: A Study of Pedagogy and Achievement Goals". ACM Transactions on Computing Education. 15 (3): 14:1–14:18. doi:10.1145/2802752. S2CID 18049836.
- Zingaro, Daniel (2018). "Achievement Goals in CS1". Achievement Goals in CS1: Replication and Extension. Sigcse '18. pp. 687–692. doi:10.1145/3159450.3159452. ISBN 978-1-4503-5103-4. S2CID 3456406.
- Zingaro, Daniel (2012). "Student Moderators in Asynchronous Online Discussion: A Question of Questions" (PDF). MERLOT Journal of Online Learning and Teaching. 8 (3): 159–173.

== Awards ==
- ICER Best Paper Award, 2014
- SIGCSE 2016 best paper award
- JOLT 2012 best paper award
