= Sanja Fidler =

Slovenian-Canadian computer vision researcher

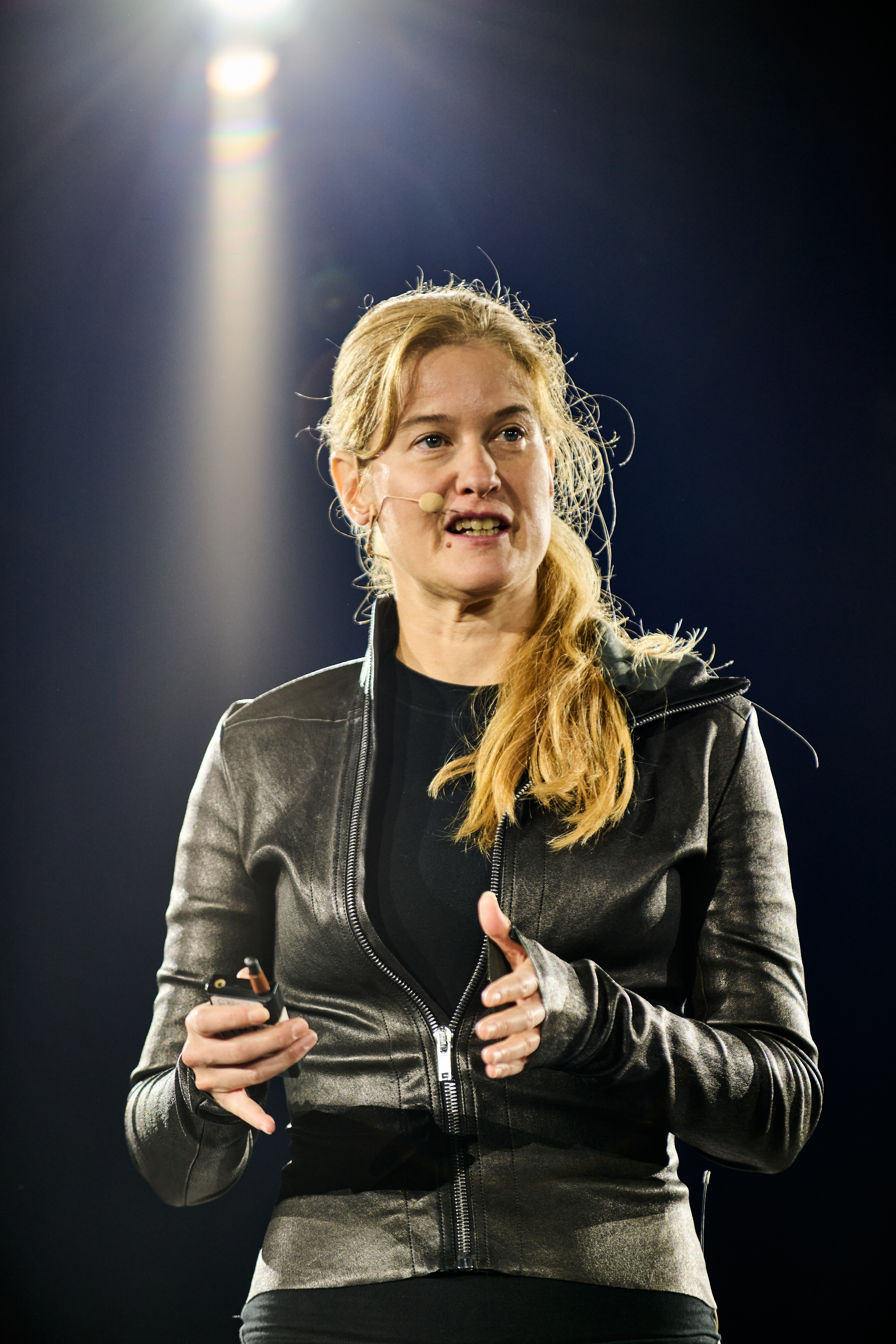
- Fidler speaking at a conference in 2025
- Born: Slovenia
- Education: University of Ljubljana (PhD, BSc)
- Awards: Canada CIFAR AI Chair, Connaught New Researcher Award, Nvidia Pioneers of AI Award
- Scientific career
- Workplaces: University of Toronto; Veeda Innovation Inc.
- Thesis: Recognizing visual object categories with subspace methods and a learned hierarchical shape vocabulary (2010)
- Website: www.cs.utoronto.ca/~fidler/

Sanja Fidler is a Slovenian-Canadian computer scientist. She is an associate professor at the University of Toronto Mississauga and the chief executive officer of Veeda Innovation Inc. Previously, she was vice-president of artificial intelligence (AI) research at Nvidia from 2022 to 2026, leading Nvidia's Spatial Intelligence Lab. She is also a co-founder of the Vector Institute and CIFAR AI Chair. Her research is in the areas of computer vision and artificial intelligence.

== Education ==
Fidler was born in Slovenia and attended the University of Ljubljana, where she received a BSc in Applied Mathematics in 2002 and a Ph.D. in Computer Science in 2010. Following that she was a visiting scientist at UC Berkeley and a postdoctoral scholar at the University of Toronto (U of T).

== Career ==
Fidler's major research interests include 2D and 3D object detection, object segmentation and image labeling, and 3D scene understanding. Several of her works have received popular press coverage, including a pop-song generator and an algorithm to suggest fashion improvements.

Prior to joining U of T, she was an assistant professor at the Toyota Technological Institute at Chicago (TTIC). She became an assistant professor at U of T's St. George campus in 2014 before joining the Department of Mathematical and Computational Sciences at its Mississauga campus in 2016, where she has held the role of associate professor since 2020.

In 2018, she was appointed a Director of AI at Nvidia, having been hired by Jensen Huang to lead its Toronto research lab. She was vice-president of AI research at Nvidia from 2022 to 2026.

In 2026, she became the chief executive officer of Veeda Innovation Inc., a Toronto-based AI startup.

== Awards ==
Among Fidler's awards are the Connaught New Researcher Award, an Nvidia Pioneers of AI Award, Amazon Academic Research Award, and Facebook Faculty Award. She served as Program Chair of ICCV 2021. She has also served as Area Chair of several machine learning and vision conferences including NeurIPS, ICLR, CVPR, ICCV, and ECCV.
