= Mari Ruti =

Canadian philosopher (1964–2023)

- Born: Marjut Hannele Ruti; March 31, 1964; Nuijamaa, Finland
- Died: June 8, 2023 (aged 59); Mahone Bay, Nova Scotia, Canada

Academic background
- Education: Brown University (BA); Harvard University (MA, MA, PhD)
- Thesis: What then for My Soul? Subjectivity, Existential Enablement, and the Eetaphorics of Psychic Life (2000)
- Doctoral advisor: Alice Jardine
- Influences: Sigmund Freud; Jacques Lacan

Academic work
- Era: Contemporary philosophy
- Region: Western philosophy
- School or tradition: Continental philosophy
- Institutions: Harvard University; University of Toronto
- Main interests: Critical theory, psychoanalysis, continental philosophy, poststucturalism, phenomenology, feminist theory, queer theory
- Website: https://www.mari-ruti.com

Mari Ruti (March 31, 1964 – June 8, 2023) was a Finnish-Canadian philosopher. She had served as Distinguished Professor of Critical Theory and of Gender and Sexuality Studies at the University of Toronto. She was appointed to the university's graduate department of philosophy and as an undergraduate instructor at the Mississauga campus philosophy department. She was an interdisciplinary scholar within the theoretical humanities working at the intersection of contemporary theory, continental philosophy, psychoanalytic theory, cultural studies, trauma theory, posthumanist ethics, gender, and sexuality studies.

== Early life and education ==
Ruti was born on March 31, 1964, in Nuijamaa, Finland, in "a rural area near the Soviet border", to parents Jukka and Ritva Ruti, who, on their earnings as laborers, "lived in a home with no indoor heating, running water, or plumbing". Speaking of her parents, Ruti said, “I watched my mother wilt away tending a conveyer belt at a factory... and my father work harder—and sleep less and worry more—than anyone should ever be expected to.” On long bus rides—it was more than 2 hours to the nearest school—she would read, an intentional focus on education that would lead to her "ma[king] her way to the United States as a high school exchange student".

Ruti was awarded scholarship to attend Brown University, and moved to the United States at age 20, graduating from there with a BA in 1988.

She received a DEA (Diplôme d’Études Approfondies) in 1996 from Université Paris 7, where she was a student of Julia Kristeva. She went on to receive an MA and a PhD from Harvard University (the former in the Sociology Department, and the latter in 2000, in the Comparative Literature Department,).

== Career ==
From 2000 to 2004, Ruti held a lectureship at Harvard's Program for Studies of Women, Gender, and Sexuality, also serving as the program's assistant director. She arrived at the University of Toronto in 2004, was tenured in 2008, promoted to full professor in 2013, and promoted to Distinguished Professor in 2017.

Ruti's undergraduate courses focused on contemporary theory, literary criticism, cultural studies, film theory, psychoanalysis, trauma theory, and feminist theory. Her English graduate seminars focused on contemporary theory, continental philosophy, psychoanalytic theory, posthumanist ethics, trauma, and affect theory. She also taught the annual graduate seminar on queer theory at The Mark S. Bonham Centre for Sexual Diversity Studies (SDS). This seminar is the core requirement for the SDS Graduate Certificate, and it draws a diverse group of graduate students from both the humanities and the social sciences.

From 2011 to 2015, Ruti held a Canadian government Social Sciences and Humanities Research Council (SSHRC) Standard Research Grant of $70,000. From 2017 to 2021, she held an SSHRC Insight Grant of $104,000. Ruti co-edited the Psychoanalytic Horizons Book Series for Bloomsbury Press. From 2016 to 2017, Ruti was Visiting Professor and Director of Graduate Studies at the Harvard Program for Studies of Women, Gender, and Sexuality.

== Research ==
Ruti described her research as addressing "questions of subjectivity, relationality, psychic life, desire, affect, power, agency, autonomy, creativity, oppression, social change, and contemporary ethics. ... [Her] more politically oriented scholarship examines questions of social power, oppression, and agency."

Some of Ruti's politically oriented work was motivated by her background of having grown up in poverty.

== Death ==
Ruti was diagnosed with stage four breast cancer in 2018. Initially given only a year to live, she ended up living five years after her diagnosis. She died from cancer-related complications at the hospital near her home in Mahone Bay, Nova Scotia, on June 8, 2023, at the age of 59.

== Books ==
The following are books the title subject listed on their faculty web page at the University of Toronto, as of November 2022:

- Reinventing the Soul: Posthumanist Theory and Psychic Life (New York: Other Press, 2006).
- A World of Fragile Things: Psychoanalysis and the Art of Living (Albany, NY: SUNY Press, 2009).
- The Summons of Love (New York: Columbia University Press, 2011).
- The Singularity of Being: Lacan and the Immortal Within (New York: Fordham University Press, 2012).
- The Call of Character: Living a Life Worth Living (New York: Columbia University Press, 2013).
- Between Levinas and Lacan: Self, Other, Ethics (New York: Bloomsbury Press, 2015).
- The Age of Scientific Sexism: How Evolutionary Psychology Promotes Gender Profiling and Fans the Battle of the Sexes (New York: Bloomsbury Press, 2015).
- Feminist Film Theory and "Pretty Woman" (New York: Bloomsbury Press, 2016).
- The Ethics of Opting Out: Queer Theory's Defiant Subjects (New York: Columbia University Press, 2017).
- Penis Envy and Other Bad Feelings: The Emotional Costs of Everyday Life (New York: Columbia University Press, 2018).
- Distillations: Theory, Ethics, Affect (New York: Bloomsbury, 2018).
- Critical Theory Between Klein and Lacan: A Dialogue (New York: Bloomsbury, 2019). With Amy Allen.

Other works include:

- Femininity and Bad Feelings: On Everyday Life (New York: Columbia University Press, forthcoming).
- The Case for Falling in Love: Why We Can’t Master the Madness of Love—and Why That’s the Best Part (Naperville, IL: Sourcebooks Casablanca, 2011). ISBN 9781402250804.
