= Carlo Fidani =

Canadian businessman and philanthropist

Carlo Fidani OOnt is a Canadian businessman and philanthropist from Toronto, Ontario. He is chairman of the Orlando Corporation, a Mississauga-based real estate company with interests in construction and development, and property leasing and management. Fidani is also president of the Carlo Fidani Foundation.

== Family and career ==
In 1948, Fidani's grandfather, who was also known as Carlo Fidani, founded Fidani and Sons, which is now known as the Orlando Corporation. The company was eventually transferred to Orey Fidani, Fidani's father, who expanded the business.

In 2000, following the death of his father, Fidani became Chairman of Orlando Corp.

Fidani has a son who is also named Orey Fidani. He is a racing driver currently competing in the IMSA SportsCar Championship.

== Community involvement ==
In 2010, Fidani made a $10 million donation to the University of Toronto's Faculty of Medicine to assist with Ontario's chronic shortage of family physicians. His donation inspired broad support from the community, including an additional $12 million donation from Terrence Donnelly. This allowed the university to lay the foundation for the Terrence Donnelly Health Sciences Complex and Mississauga Academy of Medicine. The new academy first welcomed medical students in August 2011 and adds 54 MDs to Ontario with each graduating class.

In 2016, Fidani by way of the Orlando Corp., launched a gift-matching initiative that will see it donate up to $15 million to William Osler Health System's three hospital sites in the Toronto area.
