= Postbaccalaureate program =

Educational program

Postbaccalaureate programs (post-bacc) are reserved for students who are working toward a second entry degree. These programs are offered for those who already have a first undergraduate degree. Post Baccalaureate programs are not considered traditional graduate education, but their standing is typically more advanced than a bachelor's degree. Some of these programs are offered under the umbrella of continuing education and could be a foundational program that leads to a graduate degree. Programs like post-degree diploma, graduate diploma, graduate certificates or a pre-medical to a master's degree in a field such as biomedical or health sciences come under the range of post-baccalaureate programs. In addition, students who wish to pursue a master's degree in a field other than their BS/BA degree, may be admitted to a college or university individualized or preset postbaccalaureate program to earn the necessary entry credits in their new chosen area/subject. These courses of study would include an equivalent blend of foundation year graduate/professional school studies and final year of the specific bachelor's program or essential courses of the specific bachelor's program to take-up a graduate degree in the new field of studies. This also provides opportunity to those who prepare for changing careers and profession or as a supportive for those interested in continuing education to familiarize with new modalities in their particular fields. The usual length of the programs is 8 months to 1 year and the advanced grad-entry program that offers equivalency with first year of a graduate degree is for 2 years.

The first postbaccalaurate program was created in 1955 at Columbia University.
