= Rhonda McEwen =

Trinidadian-Canadian academic

- Dr. Rhonda McEwen in 2026

9th President and Vice-Chancellor of the University of Victoria
- Incumbent
- Assumed office October 14, 2026
- Chancellor: Marion Buller
- Preceded by: Robina Thomas (acting)

14th President and Vice-Chancellor of Victoria University, Toronto
- In office July 1, 2022 – July 1, 2026
- Chancellor: Nick Saul; Steve Paikin
- Preceded by: William Robins
- Succeeded by: William Robins (interim)

Vice-Principal (Academic) and Dean of the University of Toronto Mississauga
- In office July 1, 2021 – July 1, 2022
- Principal: Alexandra Gillespie
- Preceded by: Amrita Danière
- Succeeded by: Nicholas Rule

Personal details
- Born: 1970 or 1971 (age 55–56) Trinidad and Tobago
- Occupation: Professor, academic administrator

Academic background
- Education: University of the West Indies at St. Augustine (BSc); The City University (MBA); University of Colorado Boulder (MSc); University of Toronto (PhD)

Academic work
- Institutions: University of Toronto
- Website: rhondamcewen.vicu.utoronto.ca

Rhonda N. McEwen (born 1970 or 1971) is a Trinidadian-Canadian academic who is currently the ninth president of the University of Victoria. Previously, she was dean of the University of Toronto Mississauga, director of the Institute of Communication, Culture, Information and Technology (ICCIT), and the 14th president and vice-chancellor of Victoria University at the University of Toronto. As president of Victoria University, she became the first Black woman to lead a university in Canada.

Her research involves new technologies and information practices, particularly communication through mobile devices and tablets, communicating with robots, virtual reality, and social networks.

== Early life and education ==
McEwen was born in Trinidad and Tobago in 1970 or 1971. Her parents moved her and her family to Menomonie, Wisconsin in the United States in the late 1970s to pursue higher education. McEwen attended the University of the West Indies at St. Augustine, obtaining a Bachelor of Science (BSc) degree in sociology and management in 1994. She graduated with a Master of Business Administration (MBA) in information technology from Cass Business School at the City University (1997) and a Master of Science (MSc) in telecommunications from the University of Colorado Boulder (2000).

== Career ==
After university she worked in London and later Toronto with positions at Deloitte and IBM, where she was a consultant on information technology management. She moved to Toronto in 2003 and earned her PhD in information from the University of Toronto Faculty of Information in 2009, with a thesis on the role of mobile phones in social networks. Her research involved studying how cellphones helped first-year U of T and Toronto Metropolitan University students build and maintain friendships during their transition to university.

In 2011, her research on touchscreen technology for children on the autism spectrum was featured on 60 Minutes. This led to her joining an advisory group for Sesame Workshop, the non-profit which produces Sesame Street, which sought to discuss autism on its TV program. A new muppet that she helped create named Julia was introduced in 2017. McEwen had suggested that the character be a girl.

McEwen joined the University of Toronto in 2011 as an assistant professor of emerging media and communication in the Institute of Communication, Culture, Information and Technology (ICCIT) at its Mississauga campus (UTM). She taught courses on both the Mississauga and St. George campuses and served as UTM's special advisor to the vice-president and principal on anti-racism and equity. She has also held faculty appointments at the Department of Computer Science and Faculty of Information.

In 2019, she was appointed director of ICCIT. During her time as director, the institute became its own academic unit and grew considerably, establishing a professional experience certificate in digital media, communication and technology.

On July 1, 2021, McEwen was appointed vice-principal (academic) and dean of UTM for a five-year term alongside principal Alexandra Gillespie.

In 2022, she was named the 14th president and vice-chancellor of Victoria University, a federated university in the University of Toronto, with a five-year term beginning on July 1, 2022. Her predecessor as dean of UTM, Amrita Danière, was chosen to return to the role in the interim following McEwen's appointment at Victoria University.

=== Term as president of Victoria University ===
During her term as president in 2023, students at Victoria University protested the institution's investment in fossil fuels through its endowment funds. A student group called Climate Justice U of T occupied the Victoria College building (nicknamed Old Vic) for 18 days from March 27 to April 13, 2023. According to McEwen, between six and nine million dollars from the institution's endowment financed fossil fuel companies at the time, which comprised 3.2 per cent of its total investment. Following the protest, the Victoria University Board of Regents approved a motion on April 13 to divest from fossil fuel companies by 2030. In a 2026 interview for the Toronto Star, McEwen claimed that "The board was already working on this issue before I even got there." However, she stated that she was "honoured to be the president in the chair that gets to be part of the announcement."

=== Term as President of the University of Victoria ===
The University of Victoria in British Columbia announced on June 2, 2026 that she will be its ninth president and vice-chancellor, and began her term on October 14, 2026.

== Personal life ==
McEwen's heritage traces back to Merikins, Black refugees who left Nova Scotia and fought alongside the British during the War of 1812, and settled in Trinidad to escape bondage.

She is married and has two children including a daughter who is autistic and non-verbal.

== Awards and honours ==
She was granted awards including: a Tier 2 Canada Research Chair in Tactile Interfaces, Communication and Cognition; an Ontario Centres of Excellence grant; and several Social Sciences and Humanities Research Council (SSHRC) Insight Grants.

In 2025, she was appointed an honorary captain of the Canadian navy in Halifax.

== Selected publications ==
- Dubé, A. and McEwen, R. 2017. Understanding Tablets from Early Childhood to Adulthood. Routledge.
- Campigotto, R. and McEwen, R. 2013. "Especially social: Exploring the use of an iOS application in special needs classrooms". Computers & Education. 60 (1). Pergamon. 74-86.
- Dubé, A. and McEwen, R. 2015. "Engaging or distracting: Children’s tablet computer use in education". International Forum of Educational Technology and Society.
- McEwen, R. N. and Scheaffer, K. 2013. "Virtual mourning and memory construction on Facebook: Here are the terms of use". Bulletin of Science, Technology & Society. 33 (3-4). SAGE Publications. 64-75.
- McEwen, R., Ong, L. R., Yang, X. and Zihayat, M. 2020. "A big data analytics framework for detecting user-level depression from social networks". International Journal of Information Management. 54. Pergamon. 102141.
- Dubé, A. K. and McEwen, R. N. 2015. "Do gestures matter? The implications of using touchscreen devices in mathematics instruction". Learning and Instruction. 40. Pergamon. 89-98.
