= Master of Arts (Scottish Ancient universities) =

Undergraduate degree

In some Scottish universities, a Master of Arts (MA; Scots: Maister o Arts, Scottish Gaelic: Maighstir nan Ealan) is the holder of a degree awarded to undergraduates, usually as a first degree. It follows either a three-year general or four-year Honours degree course in humanities or social sciences and is awarded by one of several institutions.

Chiefly, these are the ancient universities of Scotland – St Andrews, Glasgow, Aberdeen, and Edinburgh. Other institutions which provide undergraduate programmes leading to an MA degree include the University of Dundee, because of its history as a constituent college of the University of St Andrews, or Heriot-Watt University at honours level only. Other Scottish universities either award the Master of Arts degree as a postgraduate qualification or not at all.

The first two years of an undergraduate Master of Arts course consist of ordinary Bachelor level courses; however, after these, students who are accepted to pursue the Honours route will complete more advanced subjects and write a dissertation in their fourth year. Students who choose to do a "general" degree will complete their third year at a lower level of specialisation, and receive a Bachelor of Arts (BA) degree or MA without Honours. For the postgraduate degree referred to in other places as "Master of Arts", some Scottish universities usually award the degree of Master of Letters (MLitt) or Master of Science (MSc). Generally, non-ancient universities in Scotland (e.g. University of Strathclyde, The Robert Gordon University, Edinburgh Napier University, etc.), award arts degrees as Bachelor of Arts.

== Subjects awarded ==
At these ancient Scottish universities, the degree of Master of Arts (MA) is usually awarded only in the liberal arts, the humanities, the fine arts, the social sciences and theology. For some science subjects, the degree of Bachelor of Science (BSc) is awarded for four years of study and that of Bachelor of Laws (LLB) after a four-year course in law. Both of these can be awarded with honours after four years or as ordinary or designated degrees after three years. An LLB can also be awarded in two years on an accelerated programme if the student has already obtained a first degree.

Degrees in some disciplines, such as psychology, can lead either to the degree of MA or that of BSc. For example, those studying psychology or management at the University of St Andrews or the University of Dundee may graduate MA or BSc, depending on whether they are a member of the Faculty of Arts or the Faculty of Sciences respectively. At the University of Aberdeen, students studying psychology are awarded an MA or a BSc, depending on which of the two they register for; while the psychology content is identical for both, the difference lies in the non-psychology constituent courses taken in the first and second years. Those on MA programmes study psychology alongside the lit arts (such as languages) or social sciences, while those on BSc programmes study pure sciences such as biology.

The Universities of Glasgow, Aberdeen, and Edinburgh also offer the degree of Bachelor of Divinity (BD) as a four-year course. This degree is offered at St Mary's College, St Andrews, but as a postgraduate degree for a graduate who is already a Master of Arts, while the undergraduate degree in divinity (theology) is designated Master of Theology (MTheol).

Newer undergraduate courses lead either to a bachelor's degree or to a master's degree in the advanced undergraduate degree scheme as above.
