= William Tomlinson (disambiguation) =

William Tomlinson was a cricketer.

William Tomlinson may also refer to:

- Sir William Tomlinson, 1st Baronet (1838–1912), English lawyer, colliery owner and Conservative politician
- William Rae Tomlinson (1902–1979), Liberal party member of the Canadian House of Commons
- William Weaver Tomlinson (1858–1916), historian
- Bill Tomlinson, informatics researcher
- Bill Tomlinson (footballer) (1927–2000), Australian rules footballer
- Will Tomlinson (born 1986), boxer
