= Birgit Penzenstadler =

German software engineering professor

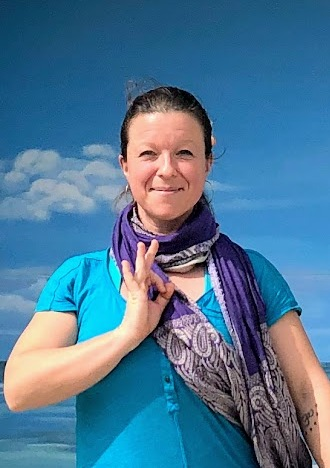
- Penzenstadler in 2019
- Born: September 9, 1981; Erding, Germany
- Education: University of Passau (MSc); Technical University of Munich (PhD); Technical University of Munich (Habilitation); UC Irvine (Postdoc)
- Known for: The Karlskrona Manifesto; Safety, Security, Now Sustainability: The Nonfunctional Requirement for the 21st Century; Sustainability in software engineering: A systematic literature review Requirements: The key to sustainability
- Title: Associate Professor
- Scientific career
- Fields: Software Engineering for Sustainability
- Workplaces: Chalmers University of Technology; Lappeenranta University of Technology
- Doctoral advisor: Manfred Broy
- Other academic advisors: Bill Tomlinson; Debra Richardson
- Website: birgit.penzenstadler.de

Birgit Penzenstadler (born September 9, 1981 in Erding, Germany) is a German associate professor of Software Engineering at Chalmers University of Technology and adjunct docent at Lappeenranta University of Technology.

She is well known for her work on environmental sustainability in software engineering and for being one of the founders of the sustainability design initiative, which seeks to advance the research on sustainability in technical disciplines such as computer science and software engineering.

She holds a PhD in Software Engineering from the Technical University of Munich, Germany. Furthermore, she is a 500-RYT yoga teacher with additional certification in breathwork (pranayama), an Embodied Mindfulness Coach, Reiki level II practitioner, and NET (narrative exposure therapy) facilitator.

== Work ==
She has been investigating well-being (www.twinkleflip.com), resilience, and sustainability from a point of view of software engineering during the past ten years, working on a body of knowledge and concepts of how to support sustainability from within RE. Part of these efforts are documented with the Karlskrona Alliance that published a body of work including the Karlskrona Manifesto (see also http://www.sustainabilitydesign.org). Penzenstadler guides meditation and breathwork on Insight Timer. https://insighttimer.com/blove

She gave a TEDx talk in 2022 in Goeteborg about how wellbeing, resilience and sustainability are connected and how to consider them when designing technology. https://www.youtube.com/watch?v=04JkvbF4I9A

Prior to Chalmers University of Technology, Birgit was a professor at California State University, Long Beach. Also she has completed a postdoctoral fellowship at the University of California, Irvine with Prof. Debra J. Richardson and Prof. Bill Tomlinson. They developed framework called SE4S that supports the infusion of sustainability in the requirements engineering (RE) and quality assurance (QA) stages of software engineering processes.

Penzenstadler coined the term "Software Engineering for Sustainability" in 2013. Also, she was the main organizer of the workshop series “Requirements Engineering for Sustainable Systems” 2012-2021 at the International Requirements Engineering Conferences. She led the Resilience Lab at California State University, Long Beach during 2015- 2019 which focused on research that evaluated the properties of a software system in relation to sustainability.
