= Christoph Becker =

Austrian-Canadian academic

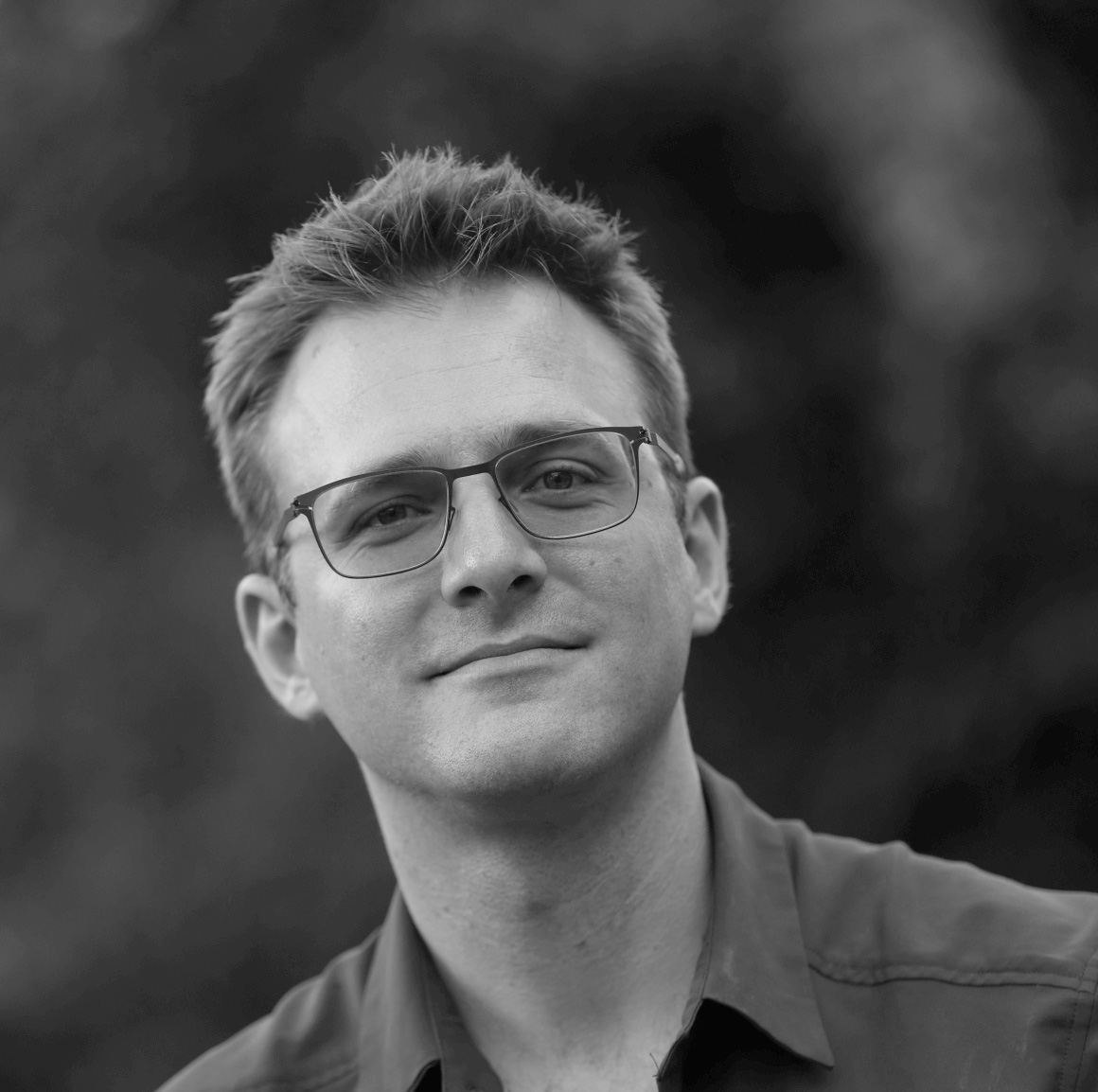
- Born: Austria
- Education: Vienna University of Technology (BSc computer science, MSc computer science, MSc economics, doctorate computer science)
- Employer: University of Toronto
- Known for: Sustainability in System Design Digital Curation Digital Preservation Planning
- Notable work: Karlskrona Manifesto (2015); Insolvent: How to Reorient Computing for Just Sustainability (2023)
- Website: christoph-becker.info

Christoph Becker is an Austrian computer scientist, Full Professor at the Faculty of Information and the School of the Environment at the University of Toronto. He leads the Just Sustainability Design Lab, where his research focuses on sustainability and social justice in computing and technology design.

Becker is one of the co-founders of the Karlskrona Manifesto for Sustainability Design and is the author of the book Insolvent: How to Reorient Computing for Just Sustainability, published by MIT Press in 2023.

== Career ==
Becker received his BSc in computer science, MSc in software engineering, MSc in economics and computer science, and doctorate in computer science at the Vienna University of Technology. After completing his PhD in 2010 with a thesis on decision-making in digital preservation, he spent a winter in Lisbon as a visiting post-doctoral researcher with the Information Systems research group at IST Lisbon. He returned to Vienna to lead a research program on scalable decision support for digital preservation as part of the large-scale EC-funded project SCAPE: Scalable Preservation Environments, which he co-developed with an international consortium of universities, memory organizations, industrial research and commercial partners.

In 2013, Becker moved to Toronto, Canada, to join the University of Toronto's Faculty of Information as an assistant professor. He became an associate professor in 2018 and a full professor in 2023. He also holds an appointment in the University of Toronto's School of the Environment.

Becker leads the Just Sustainability Design Lab, an interdisciplinary research group exploring how technology can serve social justice, environmental sustainability, and community well-being. He also is one of the Fellows of the University of Toronto's Sustainable Development Goals Academy.

His book Insolvent: How to Reorient Computing for Just Sustainability appeared at MIT Press from June 2023. The book was named a finalist for the 2024 Association of American Publishers PROSE Award in the Engineering and Technology category, and was also selected as 2024 Choice Outstanding Academic Title.

== Research ==
Becker's research focuses on just sustainability design, a framework for systems design practice, research, and pedagogy that gives priority to environmental sustainability and social justice. The framework examines how the effects of systems design choices may be distributed unevenly across people, communities, places, and time. It seeks not only to prevent or reduce harm, but also to use systems design to bring about socially just and ecologically sustainable change.

Becker directed the Digital Curation Institute at the University of Toronto from 2014 to 2024. His earlier research focused on digital preservation, digital curation, archiving, and digital libraries. This work included the development of methods and decision-support systems for the long-term preservation of digital information.

He has received funding from the National Science and Engineering Research Council of Canada, Ontario Research Fund, Canada Foundation for Innovation, the European Commission's Framework Program, the Vienna Science and Technology Fund, the United Nations' Food and Agriculture Organization, the University of Toronto's Connaught Fund, and School of Cities Urban Challenge Grants.

Becker is an associate editor of the recently launched ACM Journal of Responsible Computing, a member of the program committees of ICSE, CHASE, ICT4S, Computing within Limits, and EASE, and a co-founder of TechOtherwise.

== Works ==
- Insolvent: How to Reorient Computing for Just Sustainability
- Christoph Becker - Google Scholar

== Public Writing ==
- Christoph Becker, Toward justice and sustainability in the tech industry. TechTarget, September 2023.
- Christoph Becker, Andrew Clement. It's time to defund Big Tech and empower communities. Toronto Star.
- Christopher Frauenberger, Ann Light, Christoph Becker, Dawn Walker, Curtis McCord, Steve Easterbrook, Lisa Nathan, Irina Shklovski, Elizabeth Patitsas. Ein neuer Kompass für die digitale Zukunft. Kommentare der anderen, DerStandard.at

== Awards ==
- 2025: Best Paper Awards, 28th ACM SIGCHI Conference on Computer-Supported Cooperative Work & Social Computing (CSCW), for "Near Data" and "Far Data" for Urban Sustainability: How Do Community Advocates Envision Data Intermediaries? https://doi.org/10.1145/3710901
- 2019: Best Paper award, 6th International Conference on ICT for Sustainability (ICT4S), for "Sidewalk and Toronto: Critical Systems Heuristics and the Smart City" arXiv:1906.02266.
- 2019: W. Kaye Lamb Prize of the Association of Canadian Archivists (ACA) for article "Metaphors We Work By: Reframing Digital Objects, Significant Properties and the Design of Digital Preservation Systems"
- 2014: Best Demo award, Combined ACM/IEEE Joint Conference on Digital Libraries & Theory and Practice of Digital Libraries Conference, for SCAPE Planning and Watch System
- 2012: Digital Preservation Coalition: Digital Preservation Award for Research & Innovation in Digital Preservation for the PLANETS project (Digital Preservation Award - Wikipedia)
- 2011: Shortlisted for the German/Austrian/Swiss computer science doctoral dissertation award.
- 2010: German Association for the Advancement of Information Sciences: Thesis award for doctoral thesis, "Trustworthy preservation planning".
