= University of Toronto Faculty of Information =

Faculty of the University of Toronto

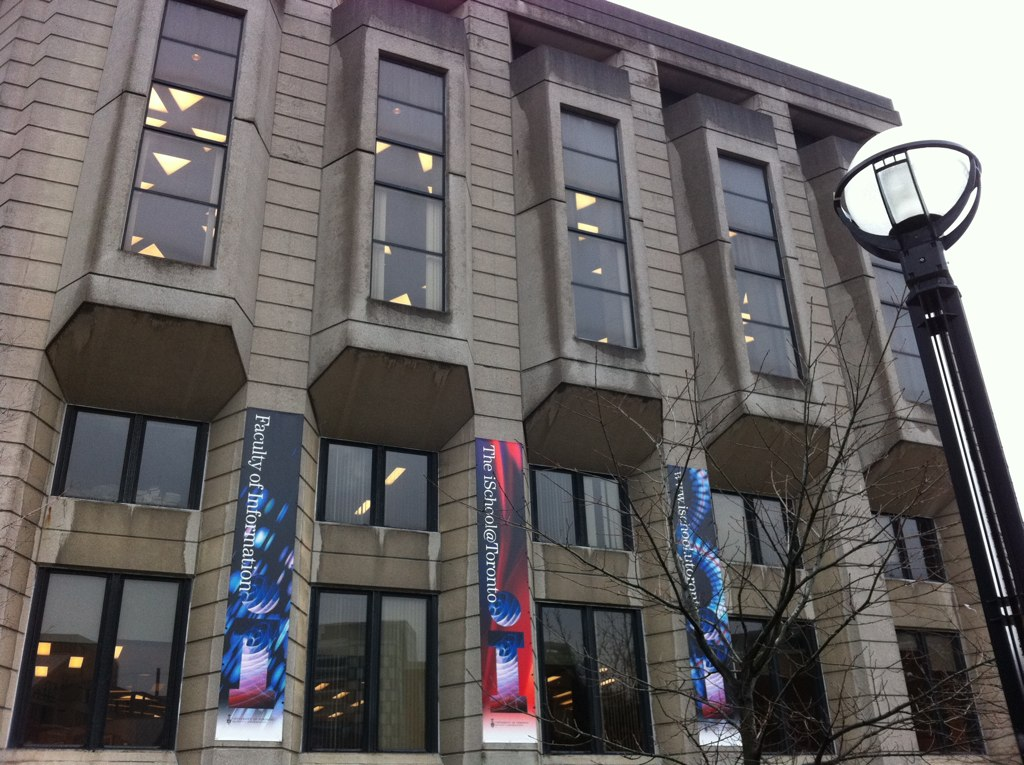
- Claude T. Bissell Building is currently undergoing renovations
- Type: Public information school
- Established: 1928; 98 years ago
- Parent institution: University of Toronto
- Accreditation: ALA
- Academic affiliations: iSchool Organization
- Dean: Javed Mostafa
- Faculty: 76 (UTSG, UTSC, and UTM; full-time and adjunct)
- Students: 1,283
- Location: Toronto, Ontario, Canada; 43°39′54″N 79°23′58″W
- Website: ischool.utoronto.ca

The Faculty of Information is the information school (iSchool) of the University of Toronto, based on its St. George campus in downtown Toronto, Ontario, Canada. Established in 1928 as a library school to train professionals in library and information science, its research and teaching expanded over the decades to encompass various adjacent technical and non-technical fields.

To acknowledge this broader shift in academic inquiry from solely libraries, the faculty became a tier one member of the iSchool Association in 2005, and added the iSchool designation to its name in 2006, becoming the first information school in Canada to do so. It has since become a hub at the university for interdisciplinary inquiry and teaching in human-computer interaction, data science, knowledge management, information systems, information policy, museum studies, culture and technology, digital humanities and information science.

The Faculty of Information is housed at the Claude Bissell building, which is attached to the John P. Robarts Research Library and the Thomas Fisher Rare Book Library. As of August 2026, the building is undergoing a renovation intended to modernize its facilities and better support the Faculty's research and teaching activities. During the renovation period, the Faculty of Information has relocated to two locations on Spadina Avenue in Toronto: 455 Spadina Avenue and 481 Spadina Avenue.

== History ==
The Faculty of Information was founded as the University of Toronto Library School within the Ontario College of Education in 1928 and was initially housed at 315 Bloor Street. In 1971, the school moved again to its present location at 140 St. George Street. The name changed to the Faculty of Library and Information Science in 1982 and then the Faculty of Information Studies in 1994. In 2005, the faculty joined the iSchool movement and accordingly in 2006, it was renamed the Faculty of Information (iSchool).

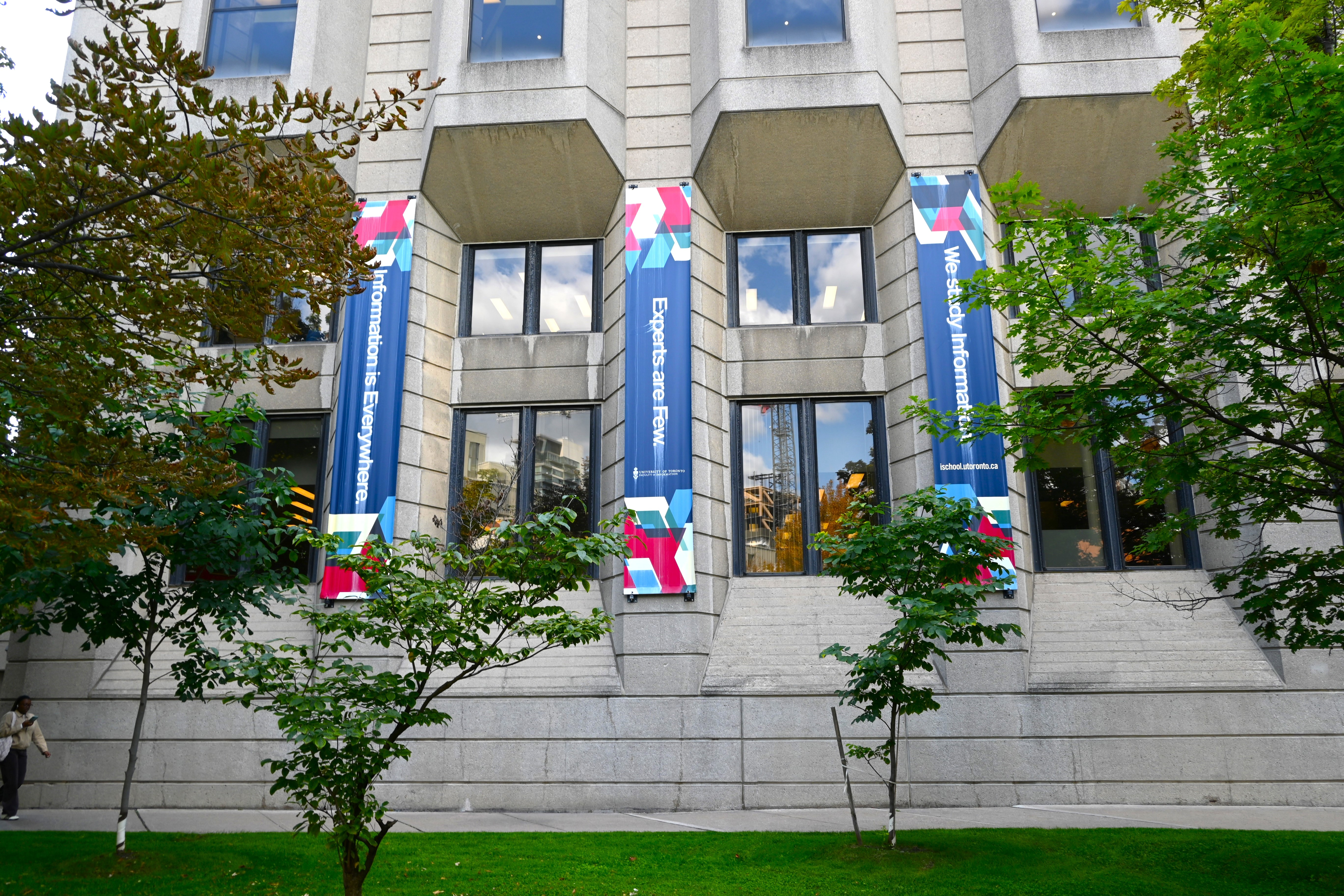
Banners outside the Bissell Building.

The faculty has offered a variety of degrees since its inception, which haved reflected the evolving needs of professions in information and technology related professions, as well as librarianship. Between 1928 and 1936, it offered one-year Diploma in Librarianship, and from 1936 to 1970, a one-year Bachelor of Library Science degree, which was accredited by the American Library Association in 1937. The late 1960s saw the emergence of the Master of Library Science (MLS) degree as the first professional degree in librarianship, which was introduced in the school in 1970 and required four semesters to complete. The doctoral program was established in 1971, with Claire England holding the first PhD in library science that was awarded in Canada in 1974.

In 1988, the faculty began to offer a Master of Information Science (MIS) degree. In 1995, the MLS and MIS degrees were both replaced with the Master of Information Studies (MISt) degree, which had three areas of specialization: archival studies, information systems, and library and information science. The name of the degree was changed to Master of Information (MI) in 2009.

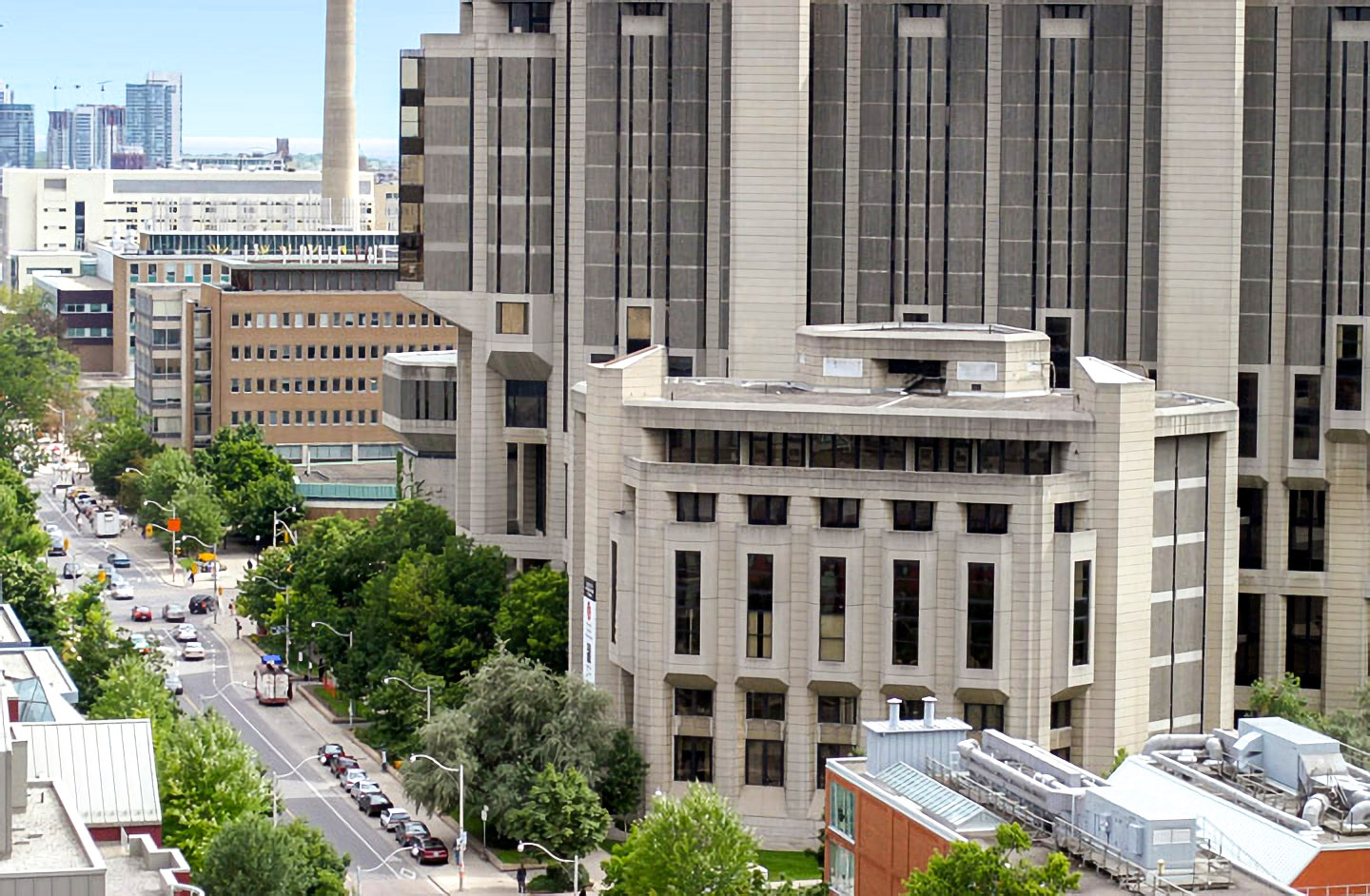
Aerial view of the Bissell Building (lower middle) on the University of Toronto St. George campus

In 2006, the faculty began to offer a Master of Museum Studies (MMSt) degree when the Department of Museum Studies joined the Faculty of Information. The MMSt is a professionally oriented degree that aims to train professionals in galleries, museums and other cultural heritage institutions.

In 2019, the school welcomed the first cohort of its second-entry Bachelor of Information program. The curriculum blends social sciences, humanities, and computing science to study how societies interact with information technologies and to provide students with the skills needed to understand and create change in a data- and technology-intensive world. Conceived with a design and professionally-oriented focus, it aims to integrate students' prior academic training in the first two or more undergraduate years with coursework in computing, data science, design, and critical technology studies. The BI is unique for integrating design thinking, critical scholarship, and hands-on learning (including studio courses and a required Work Integrated Learning Practicum) into a single program, aiming to produce graduates ready for careers in information technology, policy and research, or cultural stewardship

== Academics ==
The Faculty offers degrees related to information studies: a second-entry undergraduate Bachelor of Information, a Master of Information (organised into 8 concentrations), a Master of Museum Studies, and a PhD in Information, along with combined degree programs awarded in collaboration with other academic divisions at the university, on both the St. George and Mississauga campuses.

=== Undergraduate program ===
The Bachelor of Information (BI) is a professional program that blends coursework in the social sciences, humanities, and computer science to formally study how people and societies interact with information technologies. Being a second-entry program, students apply for the program at least by the end of their second year of undergraduate study. Many students also apply at the end of their third year or after completing an undergraduate degree in another field. Grades as well as a statement of intent for switching form the basis of their application to the program, with student fit for the faculty and program are emphasized in admissions decisions.

The BI imparts graduates with a interdisciplinary set of technical and conceptual tools that prepare them for computing- or data-related positions in industry, or for possible graduate study in Human Computer Interaction, Archives and Records Management, Librarianship, Policy Studies, Business or Computer Science.

The Faculty is transitioning its undergraduate curriculum to meet the evolving demands of the real world. The four-year Bachelor of Information (BI) degree is designed for students who want to understand both the technical and human dimensions of the digital world. The program prepares students to design, build, analyze and improve information systems responsibly and ethically.

The new degree received official approval from the Ontario Universities Council on Quality Assurance in April. It will welcome its first cohort of students in September 2027, with applications opening in fall 2026 for direct entry from high school.

==== Coursework ====
Courses in the program involve lecture and technical studio work, instructed by professors from the graduate Information program and industry practitioners.

In the first year, lecture courses give rigorous training in critical analysis and in issues around technology and society, while studio courses offer hands-on training with conceptual frameworks, computer hardware, and software commonly used in user experience design, computer programming and data science professions. A practicum preparation course helps students become acquainted with information professions, transitions students from their previous studies, and provides guidance in acquiring their summer practicum position.

Between the first and second years, students take a practicum course which is a work integrated learning experience enabling them to get practical experience related to Information in an outside-of-classroom setting. These positions have ranged from industry roles in user experience design or data science, to research assistantships on campus with faculty doing similar work.

In the second year, more advanced lecture and studio work builds upon the foundational training, coupled with elective and independent research courses taken either from the Faculty of Information or other University of Toronto faculties such as Engineering or Arts and Science. In their final term, students are required to complete a capstone course, where teams of students are paired with a faculty advisor to solve an open-ended design problem typically within the realm of information technology. Previous projects have encompassed a social media account archival platform, a trash collection robot, and a terms and conditions summarization tool, among others.

=== Graduate programs ===
Master of Information (MI)

- Archives and Records Management (ARM)
- Critical Information Policy Studies (CIPS)
- Culture and Technology (C&T)
- Human-Centred Data Science (HCDS)
- Information Systems and Design (ISD)
- Knowledge Management and Information Management (KMIM)
- Library and Information Science (LIS)
- User Experience Design (UXD)

Master of Museum Studies (MMSt)

Combined Degree Program (CDP)

This program permits graduate students to complete a Master of Information (MI) and a Master of Museum Studies (MMSt) concurrently within the span of three years.

=== PhD program ===
The Faculty of Information offers a PhD in Information, a four-year advanced research degree, attracting students from a wide range of backgrounds, who conduct research at the intersection of information, technology, culture, people, and communities.

=== Collaborative specializations ===
Collaborative Specializations are open to all graduate students in the Faculty of Information. They are designed to allow students to focus on specialized subject interests and since they are a result of cooperation between different graduate units at the university, separate admission process is required of those who wish enter them. Currently, there are eight collaborative specializations available: Aging, Palliative & Supportive Care Across the Life Course; Book History and Print Culture, based at Massey College; Environment Studies, Food Studies; Jewish Studies; Knowledge Media Design, led by Faculty of Information; Sexual Diversity Studies; Women and Gender Studies.

== Research institutes ==
=== Knowledge Media Design Institute ===
The Knowledge Media Design Institute (KMDI) was founded by Professor Ron Baecker and focuses on exploring and critiquing the knowledge media that enable people to communicate, create, learn, share, and collaborate. In 2018, KMDI merged with the Semaphore Research Cluster, which was co-founded in 2011 by Professors Matt Ratto, Sara Grimes, and Rhonda McEwen.

KMDI is concerned with the ever-evolving interaction between humans and technology, with a mission to carry out research and education that will inform the design of devices, systems, and applications to enhance and ameliorate the role of humans in a world of embedded, supporting, and sometimes controlling technologies.

The institute has over 60 faculty from more than 25 departments and 11 faculties across the tri-campus system. KMDI also runs a Makerspace and Virtual Reality Studio in the Bissell Building. Its research portfolio includes action research projects, cross-sector collaborations, and community outreach initiatives exploring the social, cultural, ethical, and political implications of technologies ranging from 3D printers to social media platforms and environmental data infrastructures.

The KMDI is directed by Dr. Beth Coleman, Dr. Matt Ratto, and Dr. Javed Mostafa.

=== Centre for Culture and Technology ===
Located in the historic Coach House, the centre was first launched in 1963 as the Centre for Culture and Technology by Marshall McLuhan who was a professor of English. McLuhan's 1965 draft Constitution stated the centre was established to advance understanding of the origins and effects of technology and investigate the psychic and social consequences of technologies.

The Coach House building became the centre's home in 1968. After McLuhan's death in 1980, the centre continued as the McLuhan Program for Culture and Technology. The Centre joined the Faculty of Information as a distinct research and teaching unit in 1994, with Derrick de Kerckhove directing from 1983 to 2008. In 2009, it was renamed the Coach House Institute, then in 2016 became the McLuhan Centre for Culture and Technology. However, in 2022–23, the McLuhan family rescinded permission to use the McLuhan name, and it reverted to Centre for Culture and Technology.

Currently, the centre is dedicated to theoretical, aesthetic and critical inquiry into how contemporary media shape contemporary forms of experience and our prospects for living together, with inquiry dedicated not only to contemporary media and its effects, but also to contemporary critical approaches including feminist, queer, decolonial, and antiracist perspectives.

The director of the Centre for Culture and Technology is Scott C. Richmond.

=== Digital Curation Institute ===
The Digital Curation Institute (DCI) was established in 2010 at the Faculty of Information, is an interdisciplinary unit at the Faculty of Information involved with the active management of digital information for future use, treating digital curation as a design question, a decision problem, and a policy issue at the intersection of an array of connected disciplines. The institute is currently directed by Christoph Becker, who focuses on sustainability and digital preservation research.

The DCI was launched with the international conference "Curation Matters" and comprises scholars, researchers, faculty and students from multiple disciplines investigating principles, theories, technologies, and tools related to the creation, management, use, interpretation and preservation of digital resources.

The institute emphasizes that information professionals, researchers, and organizations have a unique opportunity to play crucial, central roles in this complex ecosystem. Research areas include digital preservation, sustainability in digital curation, cultural heritage informatics, data management, and museum studies.

The DCI offers opportunities for graduate students including research assistantships, access to lectures and workshops, and connections with partners across the university. It previously ran a fellowship program that brought international researchers to Toronto.

== Academic leadership ==
Leadership at the faculty has gone through many changes through its history. The title of Dean was formalised in 1972 when the School of Library Science at the university administratively gained official "Faculty" status.

Deans of the Faculty of Information
Term	Name
2023 – Current	Javed Mostafa
2016 – 2023	Wendy Duff
2009 – 2015	Seamus Ross
2003 – 2008	Brian Cantwell Smith
1995 – 2003	Lynne Howarth
1990 – 1995	Adele M. Fasick
1984 – 1990	Ann H. Schabas
1979 – 1984	Katherine H. Packer
1972 – 1978	Francess Georgina Halpenny
1972	R. Brian Land

Directors of the School of Library Science
Term	Name
1964 – 1972	R. Brian Land
1951 – 1964	Bertha Bassam
1928 – 1951	Winifred G. Barnstead

== Publications ==
The iJournal is the Faculty's open access academic journal. Founded in 2016, it is written, edited, directed, designed and produced by students at the Faculty of Information, primarily in the graduate program. The topics of the iJournal reflects the multiple disciplines that make up the information sciences taught at the faculty.

MISC Monthly Newsletter is published by the Master of Information Student Council (MISC), a group of elected volunteers that work to improve student life for MI students at University of Toronto's Faculty of Information.

The Master of Museum Studies Student Association (MUSSA) at the University of Toronto communicates information about student events, activities, and general updates throughout the academic year.

The Faculty of Information's official Informed newsletter is published monthly, with occasional special editions. The alumni magazine, also called Informed, is now published annually in January.

== Alumni Association ==
The Faculty of Information Alumni Association (FIAA) was first founded in 1929 and represents the over 6,700 graduates of the Faculty of Information. It sponsors a number of events and programs, including Job Shadowing and publishes an online magazine, Informed, dedicated to news about the Faculty of Information and its alumni.

== Notable alumni ==
- Phyllis Yaffe, Canadian politician and media executive and the former Consul General of Canada in New York, United States
- Vickery Bowles, Retired City Librarian, Toronto Public Library
- Kelly Anne McKinley, CEO, Bay Area Discovery Museum
- Carol Radford-Grant, Provincial Archivist, Government of Saskatchewan
- Masoud Al-Rawahi, co-founder and CEO, PhazeRo
- Mary Berg, chef and television host

== See also ==
- Institute of Communication, Culture, Information and Technology
