= List of academic units of the University of Toronto =

This list of academic units of the University of Toronto includes all academic divisions of the University of Toronto, as well as academic departments and extra-departmental units (type EDU:A and EDU:B) within those divisions.

== List ==
Note that academic divisions are listed in bold.

- **Applied Science and Engineering, Faculty of**
  - Aerospace Studies, Institute for
  - Biomedical Engineering, Institute of
  - Chemical Engineering and Applied Chemistry, Department of
  - Civil and Mineral Engineering, Department of
  - Electrical and Computer Engineering, The Edward S. Rogers Sr. Department of
  - Engineering Science, Division of
  - Materials Science and Engineering, Department of
  - Mechanical and Industrial Engineering, Department of
  - Studies in Trans-disciplinary Engineering Education and Practice, Institute for
- **Architecture, Landscape, and Design, John H. Daniels Faculty of**
- **Arts and Science, Faculty of**
  - African Studies Centre
  - Anthropology, Department of
  - Astronomy and Astrophysics, David A. Dunlap Department of
  - Astronomy and Astrophysics, Dunlap Institute for
  - Art History, Department of
  - Caribbean Studies, Centre for
  - Cell and Systems Biology, Department of
  - Chemistry, Department of
  - Cinema Studies Institute
  - Classics, Department of
  - Comparative Literature, Centre for
  - Computer Science, Department of
  - Criminology and Sociolegal Studies, Centre for
  - Diaspora and Transnational Studies, Centre for
  - Drama, Theatre and Performance Studies, Centre for
  - Earth Sciences, Department of
  - East Asian Studies, Department of
  - Ecology and Evolutionary Biology, Department of
  - Economics, Department of
  - English, Department of
  - Environment, School of the
  - European and Eurasian Studies, Centre for
  - French, Department of
  - Geography and Planning, Department of
  - Germanic Languages and Literatures, Department of
  - Global Affairs and Public Policy, Munk School of
  - History, Department of
  - History and Philosophy of Science and Technology, Institute for the
  - Indigenous Studies, Centre for
  - Industrial Relations and Human Resources, Centre for
  - Italian Studies, Department of
  - Jewish Studies, Anne Tanenbaum Centre for
  - Linguistics, Department of
  - Mathematics, Department of
  - Medieval Studies, Centre for
  - Near and Middle Eastern Civilizations, Department of
  - Philosophy, Department of
  - Physics, Department of
  - Political Science, Department of
  - Psychology, Department of
  - Religion, Department for the Study of
  - Slavic Languages and Literatures, Department of
  - Sexual Diversity Studies, Mark S. Bonham Centre for
  - Sociology, Department of
  - Spanish and Portuguese, Department of
  - Statistical Sciences, Department of
  - Theoretical Astrophysics, Canadian Institute for
  - Women and Gender Studies Institute
- **Continuing Studies, School of**
- **Dentistry, Faculty of**
- **Education, Ontario Institute for Studies in**
  - Applied Psychology and Human Development, Department of
  - Child Study, Dr. Eric Jackman Institute of
  - Curriculum, Teaching and Learning, Department of
  - Leadership, Higher and Adult Education, Department of
  - Social Justice Education, Department of
- **Graduate Studies, School of**
- **Information, Faculty of**
- **Kinesiology and Physical Education, Faculty of**
- **Law, Henry N.R. Jackman Faculty of**
- **Management, Joseph L. Rotman School of**
- **Medicine, Temerty Faculty of**
  - Anesthesiology and Pain Medicine, Department of
  - Biochemistry, Department of
  - Cellular and Biomolecular Research, Terrence Donnelly Centre for
  - Family and Community Medicine, Department of
  - Immunology, Department of
  - Laboratory Medicine and Pathobiology, Department of
  - Medical Biophysics, Department of
  - Medical Imaging, Department of
  - Medical Science, Institute of
  - Medicine, Department of
  - Molecular Genetics, Department of
  - Nutritional Sciences, Department of
  - Obstetrics and Gynecology, Department of
  - Occupational Science and Occupational Therapy, Department of
  - Ophthalmology and Vision Sciences, Department of
  - Otolaryngology - Head and Neck Surgery, Department of
  - Paediatrics, Department of
  - Pharmacology and Toxicology, Department of
  - Physical Therapy, Department of
  - Physiology, Department of
  - Psychiatry, Department of
  - Radiation Oncology, Department of
  - Rehabilitation Sciences Institute
  - Speech-Language Pathology, Department of
  - Surgery, Department of
- **Music, Faculty of**
- **Nursing, Lawrence S. Bloomberg Faculty of**
- **Pharmacy, Leslie Dan Faculty of**
- **Public Health, Dalla Lana School of**
  - Health Policy, Management and Evaluation, Institute of
- **Social Work, Factor-Inwentash Faculty of**
- **University of Toronto Mississauga**
  - Anthropology, Department of
  - Biology, Department of
  - Chemical and Physical Sciences, Department of
  - Communication, Culture, Information and Technology, Institute of
  - Economics, Department of
  - English and Drama, Department of
  - Forensic Sciences, Institute of
  - Geography, Geomatics and Environment, Department of
  - Historical Studies, Department of
  - Language Studies, Department of
  - Management, Department of
  - Management and Innovation, Institute for
  - Mathematical and Computational Sciences, Department of
  - Philosophy, Department of
  - Political Science, Department of
  - Professional Graduate Programs Centre
  - Psychological and Brain Sciences, Department of
  - Sociology, Department of
  - Study of University Pedagogy, Institute for the
  - Visual Studies, Department of
- **University of Toronto Scarborough**
  - Anthropology, Department of
  - Arts, Culture and Media, Department of
  - Biological Sciences, Department of
  - Computer and Mathematical Sciences, Department of
  - English, Department of
  - Environmental and Physical Sciences, Department of
  - Global Development Studies, Department of
  - Health and Society, Department of
  - Historical and Cultural Studies, Department of
  - Human Geography, Department of
  - Language Studies, Department of
  - Management, Department of
  - Philosophy, Department of
  - Political Sciences, Department of
  - Psychology, Department of
  - Sociology, Department of
