= Francess Halpenny =

Canadian editor and professor

- Born: May 27, 1919; Ottawa, Ontario, Canada
- Died: December 25, 2017 (aged 98); Toronto, Ontario, Canada
- Known for: Editor and academic
- Awards: Order of Canada

Francess Georgina Halpenny CC FRSC (May 27, 1919 – December 25, 2017) was a Canadian editor and professor.

Born in Ottawa, she received a master's degree in English language and literature from the University of Toronto in 1941. She joined the editorial department of the University of Toronto Press in 1941. She was appointed managing editor in 1965 and associate director (academic) in 1979. She served as dean of the Faculty of Library Science at the University of Toronto from 1972 to 1978, now known as University of Toronto Faculty of Information. From 1969 to 1988, she was a general editor of the Dictionary of Canadian Biography and promoted Canadian history on CBC Radio.

In 1979, she was made an Officer of the Order of Canada and was promoted to Companion in 1984. In 1977 she was made a Fellow of the Royal Society of Canada. She was awarded the Molson Prize in 1983 for her editorial work on the Dictionary of Canadian Biography. She has also received eleven honorary degrees from various Canadian universities. Halpenny died in December 2017 at the age of 98.
