= Kimberly Strong =

Atmospheric physicist

- Education: Memorial University of Newfoundland, University of Oxford
- Scientific career
- Fields: Experimental Atmospheric Physics
- Workplaces: University of Toronto
- Thesis: Spectral parameters of methane for remote sounding of the Jovian atmosphere (1992)
- Doctoral advisor: F. W Taylor
- Website: Research website

Kimberly "Kim" E. Strong is an atmospheric physicist and the first woman to serve as chair of the Department of Physics at the University of Toronto. Her research involves studying stratospheric ozone chemistry, climate, and air quality using ground-based, balloon-borne and satellite instruments.

== Early life and education ==
Strong received a Bachelor of Science in physics from the Memorial University of Newfoundland in 1986. Strong was interested in fields that applied physics to larger problems, eventually deciding to focus on atmospheric physics for graduate studies. Supervised by Fred Taylor at the University of Oxford, she performed near-infrared spectroscopy in the lab, mimicking conditions in the atmosphere of Jupiter, in preparation for the Galileo spacecraft's arrival at Jupiter in 1995. She received a D.Phil. in 1992 from the Atmospheric, Oceanic, and Planetary Physics Group at the University of Oxford. During her time at Oxford, she was a student at the first International Space University Summer Session Program in 1988 and then returned as a staff member in 1990.

== Career ==
After graduating with a doctorate, Strong moved to the University of Cambridge, where she was a postdoctoral research associate from 1992 to 1994. In 1994, she returned to Canada, becoming a postdoctoral research associate at the Centre for Atmospheric Chemistry at York University in Toronto. One year later, she joined the faculty at York, becoming an assistant professor in the Department of Earth and Atmospheric Science. In 1996, she moved to the University of Toronto Department of Physics. She was the only female faculty member in the department at the time. She was promoted to associate professor in 2001 and full professor in 2006.

After her graduate studies, Strong's research interests turned to Earth's atmosphere. Strong was the principal investigator of the Middle Atmosphere Nitrogen TRend Assessment (MANTRA) project from 1998 to 2006. This collaboration used a series of high-altitude balloon flights to measure trace gasses in the stratosphere over North America, including mid-latitude stratospheric ozone and compounds of nitrogen and chlorine that interact with ozone in the upper atmosphere.

Strong has traveled to Eureka, Nunavut since 1999 to conduct research in the Canadian high arctic. She was one of the founders of the Canadian Network for the Detection of Atmospheric Change (CANDAC) which established the Polar Environment Atmospheric Research Laboratory (PEARL) on Ellesmere Island in 2005. The PEARL station provides long-term monitoring of the Arctic atmosphere and data to track its evolution and variability. She was the director of the NSERC CREATE Training Program in Arctic Atmospheric Science, which ran from 2010 to 2016. This program provided students and postdoctoral fellows with training in Arctic atmospheric science.

Strong founded the University of Toronto Atmospheric Observatory (TAO) in 2001, which monitors trace gasses in the stratosphere and troposphere from the roof of the McLennan Physical Laboratories Burton Tower at the University of Toronto. She is also the principal investigator of the Canadian Fourier transform infrared (FTIR) spectrometer Observing Network (CAFTON), which uses several monitoring stations across Canada, including TAO, to measure gasses and monitor changes in the atmosphere.

In 2010, she was a visiting fellow at the Centre for Atmospheric Chemistry at the University of Wollongong in Australia.

Strong was the director of the School of the Environment at the University of Toronto from 2013 to 2018. She also served as vice-president (2018-2019) and president (2019-2020) of the Canadian Meteorological and Oceanographic Society. From 2019 to 2024 she was the chair of the Department of Physics at the University of Toronto, the first woman to hold the position. She joined the board of directors of the SNOLAB Institute in July 2019. She is currently the Vice-Dean of Research and Infrastructure for the Faculty of Arts & Science at the University of Toronto.

Strong is a member of the Centre for Global Change Science and the Graduate Faculty of the School of the Environment at the University of Toronto.

== Honours and awards ==
- 2019: Fellow of the Royal Society of Canada
- 2021: Fellow, Canadian Meteorological and Oceanographic Society
- 2022: Patterson Distinguished Service Medal, Meteorological Service of Canada
- 2022: Willet G. Miller Medal, Royal Society of Canada
- 2022: APECS International Mentorship Award, Association of Polar Early Career Scientists and the ArcticNet Student Association
