= Polar Environment Atmospheric Research Laboratory =

Research facility in Nunavut, Canada

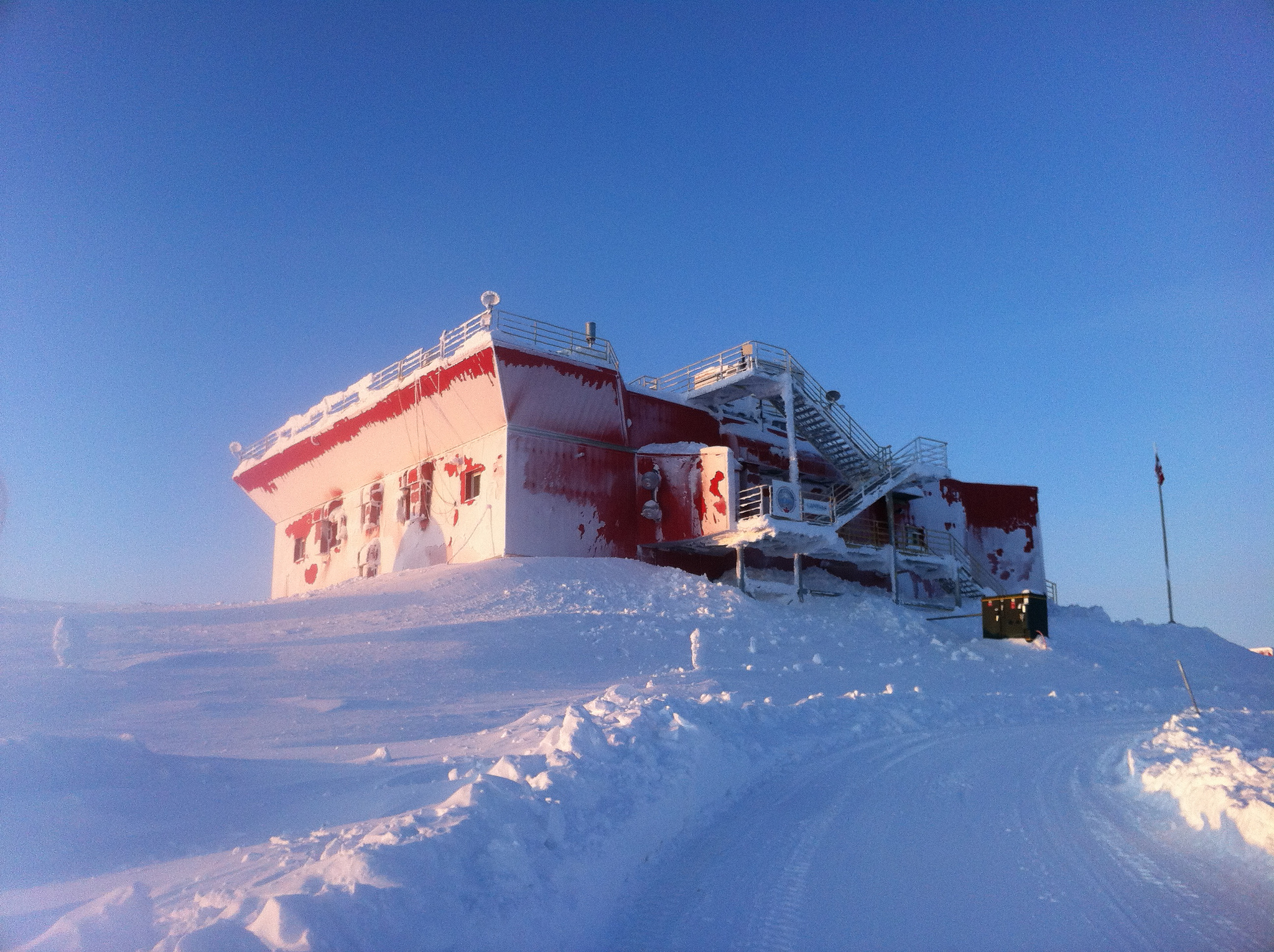
- Polar Environment Atmospheric Research Laboratory, Ridge Lab
- Nickname: PEARL
- Established: 2005
- Field of research: Atmospheric Research
- Location: Ellesmere Island, Nunavut, Canada; 80.0534072°N 86.4146244°W
- Operating agency: Canadian Network for the Detection of Atmospheric Change

The Polar Environment Atmospheric Research Laboratory (PEARL) is an atmospheric research facility in the Canadian High Arctic, located on Ellesmere Island, Nunavut. Considered one of the most important Arctic research labs in the world, it was the subject of international media attention when it almost closed due to funding cuts by the Canadian Federal Government in 2012.

== History ==
PEARL is located on Ellesmere Island, about 15 km from the Eureka Weather Station in Eureka, Nunavut and about 1,100 km from the North Pole. It consists of 3 facilities: the Ridge Lab building, originally built by the Meteorological Service of Canada in 1992 to hold the Arctic Stratospheric Ozone Observatory (AStrO), the Zero (0) Altitude PEARL Auxiliary Laboratory (0PAL) and the Surface Atmospheric Flux and IRradiation Extension (SAFIRE). Full time AStrO operations ended in 2001 due to government budget cuts.

After hearing that AStrO (later known as the Ridge Lab) was in danger of being demolished, Canadian Network for the Detection of Atmospheric Change (CANDAC), a group of university-based climate scientists and government researchers who study the atmosphere over Canada, proposed to take over the facility. CANDAC was able to successfully re-open the facility in 2005 with a grant from the federal Canada Foundation for Innovation (CFI). PEARL has operated continuously since 2005.

== Funding concerns ==
=== 2012 defunding ===
From 2005 to 2010, most of the station's $1.5 million per year operating budget came from the nonprofit Canadian Foundation for Climate and Atmospheric Science (CFCAS), which received more than $100 million in research grants over 10 years from the Canadian federal government. In the 2011 budget, put forward by Prime Minister Stephen Harper's Conservative government, CFCAS received no funding. A new fund with $35 million over five years was allocated for climate and atmospheric research, the Climate Change and Atmospheric Research Initiative (CCAR). This new fund was administered by Natural Sciences and Engineering Research Council of Canada (NSERC).

In 2012, one year after the creation of the $35 million dollar CCAR fund, no money had been released to scientists. In February 2012, with no funding to continue station operations, CANDAC announced PEARL's impending closure. At the same time, the government announced final plans to build a new $204 million federal government Canadian High Arctic Research Station (CHARS) in Cambridge Bay, Nunavut. With an annual budget of $26.5 million, the government said this new facility would be "a world-class hub for science and technology in Canada's North." Located about 1200 km south of PEARL, this station is too far south to effectively measure ozone depletion or changes in the arctic atmosphere.

The closure of PEARL, along with the closing of the Experimental Lakes Area in northwestern Ontario, provoked an outcry from Canadian and International scientists. Critics pointed out that closing PEARL and opening CHARS made little financial sense, and charged said the new base would be "a command and control center for resource extraction and sovereignty." The scientific journal Nature said that the "move comes just as data from the fast-changing Arctic climate are most needed" and that it "is hard to believe that finance is the true reason" for the closure. In the month after the announcement, the Canadian public donated $12,000 to help keep the station from closing. Kim Strong, one of the founders of CANDAC, said that while the funds were not enough to keep the station open, the expression of support was "quite heartwarming."

In 2013, about 20 days before the facility was set to permanently close, the government released last-minute funding from CCAR to save PEARL, allotting $5-million over 5-years. This was about two-thirds of the previous operating budget, and was not enough to keep an operator at the station year-round, meaning that much of the existing equipment had to be automated. In addition, during the 2012 funding cuts the lab lost its trained operators and observations were no longer taken continuously, which reduced researchers' confidence in their data.

=== Later funding concerns ===
The lab again faced an uncertain future when CCAR funding ran out in 2017. The new, Liberal government under Prime Minister Justin Trudeau provided $1.6-million in short-term funding for the facility. However, this funding ran out again in September 2019. Canadian scientists have criticized the Trudeau government for not having a more stable source of funding for fundamental climate science.

As of mid 2026, PEARL operations continue with limited funding. The measurement scope is mostly unchanged, but several factors limit the ability to support ongoing measurements at the previous level.
