= Karl Jaffary =

American-born Canadian politician (1936–2024)

Toronto City Councillor for Ward 7
- In office 1969–1974 Serving with John Sewell
- Preceded by: New ward boundaries
- Succeeded by: Janet Howard

Metro Toronto Councillor for Ward 7
- In office 1969–1974
- Preceded by: New ward boundaries
- Succeeded by: John Sewell

Personal details
- Born: Karl Dennis Jaffary; March 20, 1936 New Orleans, Louisiana, U.S.
- Died: July 2, 2024 (aged 88) Toronto, Ontario, Canada
- Spouses: Ann Jaffary (died); Sherrill Cheda (m. 1987; died 2008); Doris Dyke (died)
- Children: 2

Karl Dennis Jaffary (March 20, 1936 – July 2, 2024) was a Canadian municipal politician in Toronto, Ontario.

== Life and career ==
Jaffary was born in New Orleans on March 20, 1936, and moved to Toronto with his family in 1940. He went to school in Toronto and attended North Toronto Collegiate Institute and University of Toronto Schools. He went to the University of Toronto and graduated from the Faculty of Law. He practised with Blake, Cassels & Graydon before starting his own firm in 1968.

After several years of practice at Houser Henry Loudon and Syron, Jaffary joined Gowlings in 1992, before continuing his municipal planning law practice as a sole practitioner near the turn of the century.

Jaffary was active with the federal New Democratic Party and served as vice-president from 1969 to 1973. Jaffary became active in local politics in 1968 when he became president of the Ward 2 Residents' Association in the Cabbagetown area. The association fought the city's plans to tear down housing for urban renewal. In the 1960s, Cabbagetown was a run down area of town. Since then many of the houses have been renovated and the neighbourhood is now gentrified and upscale.

Jaffary ran for Toronto City Council and became alderman for Ward 7 in 1969. As senior alderman, he sat on both the city and Metro Toronto councils. He was re-elected in 1972 but decided not to run in the 1974 election. During his tenure, he was active in the reform wing of city council along with John Sewell. He was interested in civic organization and administration and became involved in city housing policy.

Jaffary died on July 2, 2024, at the age of 88.
