= Steve M. Easterbrook =

Canadian Expert in Climate Modelling

Professor Steve M. Easterbrook Ph.D.
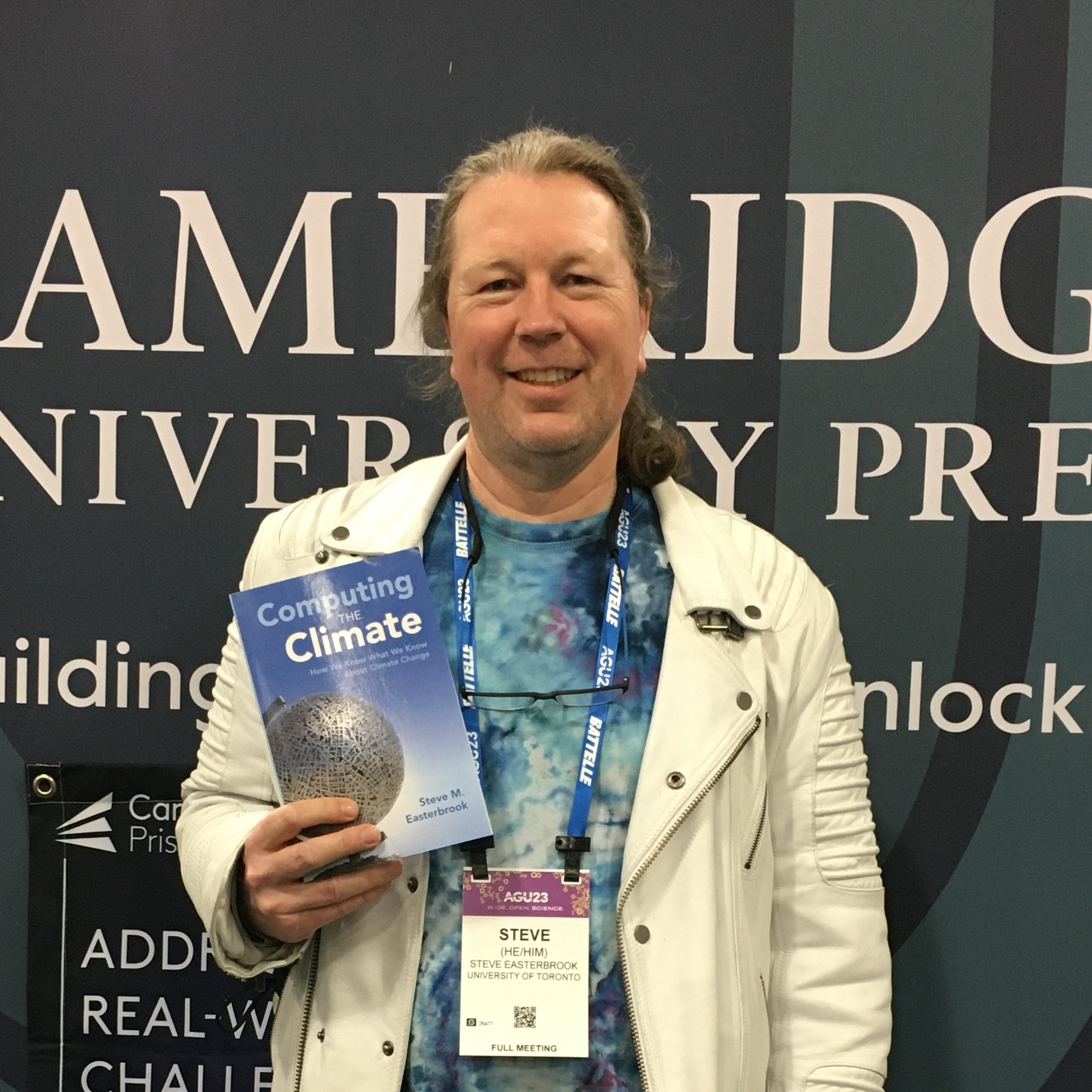
- Steve Easterbrook in 2023
- Born: August 1965 (age 60–61); Maidstone, UK
- Citizenship: British, Canadian
- Education: Imperial College, London; The University of York
- Known for: Requirements Engineering; Climate Modelling; Systems Thinking; Computer-supported cooperative work
- Scientific career
- Fields: Computer Science; Climate Science; Science and Technology Studies
- Workplaces: University College London; The University of Sussex; NASA; The University of Toronto
- Thesis: Elicitation of Requirements from Multiple Perspectives (1991)
- Doctoral advisor: Sir Anthony Finkelstein

Steve M. Easterbrook (born 1965) is a Canadian scientist. He is a full professor of computer science and environment at the University of Toronto and director of the School of the Environment. Easterbrook is well known for his work on the development, testing and use of global climate models, as well as his broader work on interdisciplinary teams, and how data and knowledge are shared across disciplinary boundaries. He is the author of over 200 papers on software, climate change, and sustainability. His book, Computing the Climate: How we know what we know about climate change was published by Cambridge University Press in 2023.

== Early life and education ==
Steve Michael Easterbrook was born in Maidstone, UK, in 1965, and grew up in St Albans, Hertfordshire. He earned an honours bachelor's degree in Mathematics and Computer Science from the University of York in 1986, where he was awarded the Spectra-Tek Prize for the best undergraduate thesis for his project applying Machine Learning to recognizing file types. In 1987, he worked as a research assistant in computer networking with Jon Crowcroft at University College London. He went on to earn a PhD in Computing from Imperial College, University of London, in 1991, where his thesis focussed on the role of disagreement and conflict in large software development projects, supervised by Sir Anthony Finkelstein.

== Career ==
Easterbrook joined the University of Sussex in 1990 as a lecturer in the School of Cognitive and Computing Sciences, where he led research projects on computer supported collaborative work and developed a framework for specifying software requirements from multiple viewpoints. At Sussex, he taught courses in Artificial Intelligence and Software Engineering, and worked with Yvonne Rogers to launch a new Masters of Human-Centered Computing.

In 1995, he was recruited as lead scientist at the NASA Katherine Johnson Independent Verification and Validation Facility in Fairmont, West Virginia, where he led research projects on applying formal methods to the specification of flight software for the International Space Station and Space Shuttle, and conducted software reliability analysis for the Earth Observing System Data and Information System (EOSDIS).

Easterbrook moved to the University of Toronto in 1999 as a professor of software engineering, where he worked with Marsha Chechik on temporal and paraconsistent logics for proving properties of formal software specifications. He also served as a consultant on systems engineering to the Canadian Space Agency and the European Aeronautic Defense and Space Company (EADS) Space Transportation Division. In 2005 he launched a major new research project investigating the software development processes for global climate models, conducting field studies at the UK Met Office, in Exeter, UK, the National Center for Atmosphere Research (NCAR) in Boulder, Colorado, the Institut Pierre Simon Laplace in Paris, France, and the Max Planck Institute for Meteorology in Hamburg, Germany. In 2018, he was appointed Director of the School of the Environment, where he teaches courses on climate change and systems thinking and serves as Principal Investigator for the CAD$5 million CFI project Data Analytics for Canadian Climate Services.

Easterbrook is well known for his research on the social and cognitive dynamics of large technical teams, including questions of how misunderstandings and disagreements are handled, the development of shared understanding, and the role of formal and informal representations of knowledge in team working. His work on climate modelling encompasses both the technical aspects of how large-scale climate simulation models are constructed and tested, and the use of data analytics tools for sharing climate data across interdisciplinary teams.

== Books ==
His books include:

- Easterbrook, S. M. (2023). Computing the climate: how we know what we know about climate change. Cambridge : New York: Cambridge University Press. doi:10.1017/9781316459768. ISBN 9781316459768. There was a 2025 review of this book in the National Centre for Science Education, for its analysis of the development, strengths, and limitations of 'modern' climate models.
- Easterbrook, Steve M. (1992). CSCW: cooperation or conflict?. London; New York: Springer-Verlag. ISBN 0387197559.
