= The Karlskrona Manifesto =

The Karlskrona Manifesto for Sustainability Design
- Founded: August 2014
- Key people: Christoph Becker; Ruzanna Chitchyan; Leticia Duboc; Steve Easterbrook; Martin Mahaux; Birgit Penzenstadler; Guillermo Rodríguez-Navas; Camille Salinesi; Norbert Seyff; Colin C. Venters

The Karlskrona Manifesto for sustainability design in software was created as an output of the Third International Workshop on Requirements Engineering for Sustainable Systems (RE4SuSy) held in Karlskrona, Sweden, co-located with the 22nd IEEE International Requirements Engineering Conference (RE'14). The manifesto arose from a suggestion in the paper by Christoph Becker, "Sustainability and Longevity: Two Sides of the Same Quality?" that sustainability is a common ground for several disciplines related to software, but that this commonality has not been mapped out and made explicit and that a focal point of reference would be beneficial.

The Karlskrona Manifesto can be split into nine principles:

1. Sustainability is never isolated and can also be looked at globally.
2. Sustainability has multiple dimensions, so it is necessary to define which dimension is being looked at during analysis.
3. Sustainability is multidisciplinary and requires multiple perspectives.
4. When looking at sustainability, this should be done independently of the focus of the system.
5. Sustainability can be assessed by the system itself and how the system fits into the larger system.
6. System status at different levels of usage is important for responsible decisions to be made with sustainable design.
7. Identify the most effective way to be sustainable over alternative options at different levels to ensure the most sustainable choice is being made.
8. The current generation shouldn't be compromised, however meeting the needs of the future generations is necessary when evaluating the most sustainable choice.
9. Assessing software over a long term and consider decisions with this in mind.

These principles were later made into a catalogue to support software sustainable design.

Since publication, the authors of The Karlskrona Manifesto adapted its principles into the Sustainability Awareness Framework (SusAF), a tool for sustainable design of software products and designs. The tool supports identification of the potential effects of software and IT systems on sustainability in five dimensions: economic, environmental, individual, social, and technical. As of 2022, they have advocated for its use towards considerations of the Sustainable Development Goals. As of June 2026, over 450 papers have referenced the Karlskrona Manifesto according to Google Scholar in work focusing on sustainability in computer science education, development processes, software requirements, societal impacts of software amongst others.
