= School of the Environment (University of Toronto) =

Academic unit of the University of Toronto Faculty of Arts and Science

Coordinates: 43°39′38″N 79°23′59″W

- Established: July 1, 2012 (14 years ago)
- Parent institution: University of Toronto Faculty of Arts and Science
- Director: Steve M. Easterbrook
- Academic staff: 26
- Administrative staff: 9
- Undergraduates: 854
- Postgraduates: 268
- Location: Toronto, Ontario, Canada
- Website: environment.utoronto.ca

The School of the Environment at the University of Toronto is a multidisciplinary extra-departmental unit (EDU) of the Faculty of Arts and Science and a hub for the study of the environment, sustainability and climate change. Founded in 2012, it offers undergraduate and graduate programs, along with joint programs with many disciplinary departments across the university.

According to Maclean's, the School ranks second for environmental science programs in Canada. The School's research focuses on knowledge mobilization on a range of environmental issues, addressing questions of how to integrate scientific knowledge with local, community-based, and Indigenous knowledge to address global environmental crises such as climate change. The School is also home to many activist student groups advocating for environmental action.

== History ==
The current School of the Environment traces its history to three institutes at the University of Toronto. In 1959, the Great Lakes Institute was founded by Prof George Burwash Langford to study the impacts of pollution on the Great Lakes, and the geologist Roger E. Deane served as its first director. In 1971, under the directorship of physicist Don Misener, this became the Institute for Environmental Studies, and offered the University's first graduate programs in environmental studies. For many years, the Institute operated a field station at Baie Du Doré on the shores of Lake Huron, and a research ship, the HCMS Porte Dauphine. Independently, Innis College established an undergraduate Environmental Studies program in 1978, with courses taught by environmental activists such as NDP Leader Jack Layton and Ontario's first Environmental Commissioner, Eva Ligeti. A third unit, the undergraduate Division of the Environment was established in 1991 by the Faculty of Arts and Science, to administer degree programs in environmental studies.

In 2005, all three units were merged to form the Centre for Environment (CfE), under the directorship of the environmental philosopher Prof Ingrid Stefanovic. The Centre was then renamed the School of the Environment, officially established on July 1, 2012. The inaugural director of the School was the atmospheric physicist, Professor Kim Strong.. In 2024, the School became the only academic institution in North America to commit to fossil fuel dissociation.

== Academics ==
=== Undergraduate programs ===
The School offers major and minor programs in both Environmental Studies and Environmental Science, as well as a range of interdisciplinary minor programs to be taken in conjunction with other majors across the Faculty of Arts and Science. It also offers a Certificate in Sustainability and a minor in Climate Change Studies.

=== Graduate programs ===
The School offers two collaborative specialization programs, in Environmental Studies and in Environment and Health. These can be taken by graduate students in any program who are enrolled in the School of Graduate Studies. In 2021, the School of the Environment launched a 12-month thesis-based Masters of Environment and Sustainability.

=== Faculty ===
The School's faculty members mainly hold joint appointments with a variety of discipline-based departments at the University of Toronto, spanning the physical sciences, social sciences, and humanities. Several faculty are cross-appointed from the Department of Geography, Geomatics and Environment (UTM) and Department of Physical and Environmental Sciences (UTSC). The School also has 141 graduate faculty members who hold appointments in other departments, and contribute to teaching in the School's graduate programs.

Notable faculty include:

- Miriam Diamond
- Steve M. Easterbrook
- M. Murphy
- Dianne Saxe
- Kim Strong

=== Research ===
Research at the School spans a broad range of areas, including using the University campus itself as a Living Lab for sustainability, policies needed to tackle climate change, the study of persistent toxins in the environment and their impact on human health, and the role of cycling in urban transportation policy.

== See also ==
- List of academic units of the University of Toronto
