= Sherrill Cheda =

American-born Canadian librarian, writer, and feminist (1936–2008)

- Born: Sherrill Schneider; February 15, 1936; Osgood, Indiana, U.S.
- Died: June 7, 2008 (aged 72); Toronto, Ontario, Canada
- Resting place: Mount Pleasant Cemetery, Toronto
- Occupations: Librarian, writer
- Spouses: Noel Perry (m. 1958–1967); Michael Cheda (m. 1969–1979); Karl Jaffary (m. 1987)

Sherrill Cheda (née Schneider) (February 15, 1936 – June 7, 2008) was an American-born Canadian librarian, feminist writer and arts administrator. She worked in a number of academic libraries in the United States and Canada before serving as chief librarian at Seneca College.

In addition to writing for Chatelaine, she co-founded and edited Emergency Librarian, a publication focused on feminist issues in librarianship, with Phyllis Yaffe. Following her position at Seneca, she worked at the Canadian Periodical Publishers Association and the Ontario Arts Council before taking a position with the Ontario Ministry of Culture and Communications.

== Early life and education ==
Cheda was born Sherrill Schneider in Osgood, Indiana on February 15, 1936. Her father, Abraham, was a Russian Jew who had traveled on foot from Kyiv to Hamburg to escape the pogroms that followed the Russian Revolution. He eventually settled in Indiana where he married Myrtle Stout. Cheda was the eldest of their four children. She graduated from high school as valedictorian and was the first member of the family to receive a university education.

She studied briefly at Hanover College before enrolling at the University of Indiana where she completed a bachelor's degree in 1958. Cheda completed a master's degree in library science from the same university in 1963 after a break in her studies following a relocation to San Francisco and then Baltimore with her husband, Noel Perry, and their two children, in pursuit of work.

== Career ==
After working for a time at the Enoch Pratt Free Library, Cheda and her family returned to San Francisco where she held a librarian position at the San Francisco State College.

Following the end of her marriage to Perry, she left the United States on July 4, 1967, along with her children and then partner Micheal Cheda, in protest of the country's involvement with the Vietnam War. They landed in Vancouver, British Columbia where she worked in library roles at the University of British Columbia and Simon Fraser University. The couple was married from 1969 to 1975 during which time they relocated to Toronto, Ontario. For a time, Cheda worked in the Indian-Eskimo Association of Canada's library before becoming chief librarian at Seneca College. She held the position from 1973 to 1978 before serving as chair of the Applied Arts Division until 1979.

After leaving her position at Seneca College, Cheda served as executive director of the Canadian Periodical Publishers Association. Although the association was close to bankruptcy when she accepted the position, its financial outlook was improved in less than a year following her efforts to gain support from member organizations before implementing a system to help better distribute and promote publications. Beyond her work with the CPPA, she worked for the Ontario Arts Council and later holding office with the Ontario Ministry of Culture and Communications.

== Feminist writing ==
Cheda was a feminist and shared progressive views as a Chatelaine columnist. Her work covered a range of topics ranging from having male children make their own lunches and contribute to housework to accounts of her experience as a liberated housewife. Though her writing elicited angry responses from some readers, she was eventually assigned a monthly advice column called "Ask a Feminist".

In 1973, she launched Emergency Librarian alongside Phyllis Yaffe. The publication offered a feminist perspective on librarianship, a profession consisting predominantly of women working environments where management roles were overwhelmingly held by men. Covering topics such sexism, the glass ceiling, prison libraries and minority rights, Emergency Librarian was edited by Cheda and Yaffe, CEO of Atlantis Alliance, in Toronto, while Barbara Clubb, future city librarian for the City of Ottawa, managed subscriptions from her home in Winnipeg.

Emergency Librarian was prompted by heightened interest in feminist ideas among members of the Canadian Library Association following a 1973 talk Cheda gave at the association's annual conference. Titled "That Special Little Mechanism," the talk explored barriers faced by women in the profession "as well as suggestions for actions to overcome masculine mystique" that she felt "is a device that prevents women from full participation in the library world." It served as a response to the conference theme "Librarians: beginning, middle and end of career." Cheda and Yaffe continued as editors until 1979 when Ken and Carol-Ann Haycock took over, redirecting the publication's focus to library services for children and young adults.

== Death and legacy ==
Cheda died at the Princess Margaret Hospital in Toronto on June 7, 2008, from complications due to acute myelogenous leukemia (AML), at the age of 72. She was survived by her third husband Karl Jaffary, her children from her first marriage, Marc Perry and Andrew Perry, and his children from his first marriage, Eric Jaffary and Nora Jaffary. York University offers a scholarship in Cheda's name, aimed at supporting incoming women's studies graduate students.

== Select publications ==
- "That Special Little Mechanism". Canadian Library Journal. 31 (5): 422–432. 1974.
- "What Libraries can do for Women's Studies". Canadian Woman Studies. 1 (1). 1978. ISSN 0713-3235.
- Cheda, Sherrill (1977). "Indian women: An historical example and a contemporary view". In Stephenson, Marylee (ed.). Women in Canada (Rev. ed.). Don Mills, Ontario, Canada: General Publishing Co. pp. 195–208. ISBN 9780773610262.
- "Womantalk: The Voice of a Very Little Girl". Resources for Feminist Research. 13 (3). 1984. ISSN 0707-8412.
