= Phyllis Yaffe =

Canadian politician and media executive

Phyllis Yaffe C.M.

Consul General of Canada in New York, United States
- Incumbent
- Assumed office July 2016

Personal details
- Born: 1949 (age 76–77) Winnipeg, Manitoba
- Awards: Governor General's Award (2015); Canadian Association of Broadcasters' Broadcast Hall of Fame (2007)

Phyllis Yaffe (born 1949) is a Canadian politician and media executive and the former Consul General of Canada in New York, United States.

== Education and early career ==
Yaffe obtained a BA from the University of Manitoba and Bachelor of Library Science from the University of Alberta. She subsequently moved to Toronto to obtain a Masters of Library Science at the University of Toronto. After graduation, she worked as a branch librarian at the Winnipeg Public Library from 1972-73. Following this, she worked as a librarian at Seneca College in Toronto before becoming the executive director of the Canadian Children's Book Centre in 1976. Between 1973 and 1979 she launched and co-edited Emergency Librarian, alongside Sherrill Cheda, a publication focused on feminist issues in librarianship.

== Publishing, media and directorships ==
In 1980, Yaffe became the executive director of the Association of Canadian Publishers. In 1985, she became the vice-president of marketing for the popular Canadian children's magazine OWL.

Yaffe joined Alliance Atlantis Communications in 1993, subsequently serving in several C-suite and executive positions including as COO from 2004 to 2005 and CEO from 2005 to 2007. While at the company, she oversaw the development and launch of several popular specialty channels, including Showcase and the History Channel and the popular CSI television franchise.

During and since her time at Alliance Atlantis, Yaffe has been involved with several media, publishing and entertainment companies. She has served on several boards for corporations and non-profits. These include: the Cineplex Entertainment Group, for which she was chairman of the board from 2009 until 2016; independent director of Torstar Corporation from 2009 until 2016, ending her time as lead director; director of William F. White International Inc. until 2016; independent director of Astral Media since 2009; and director of Blue Ant Media.

Non-profits on whose boards she has served include: the Ontario Science Centre, the World Wildlife Fund; chairman of the Canadian Abilities Foundation Board; chairperson of the foundation to Underwrite New Drama for Pay Television; and chairman of the board and vice-chairman of board of governors at Ryerson University. She is the founding chair of WAMS (Women Against Multiple Sclerosis), which was cited in the announcement of her Governor General's Award.

== Work as Consul General ==
The aluminum and steel tariffs imposed on Canadian industries by the Trump Administration were a significant issue during her tenure, particularly in the Upstate New York areas of Buffalo and Rochester.

== Awards ==
- Canadian Women in Communications' Woman of the Year, 1999
- Lifetime Achievement Award, Women in Film and Television (WIFT), 2000.
- Canadian Association of Broadcasters’ Broadcast Hall of Fame, inducted 2007
- Governor General's Award, 2015

Yaffe holds several honorary degrees, including an Honorary Doctor of Laws from the University of Manitoba, an Honorary Doctor of Literature from Mount Saint Vincent University in Halifax, and an Honorary Doctor of Laws from Ryerson University.
