= Bill Tomlinson (footballer) =

Australian rules footballer

Personal information
- Full name: Bill Tomlinson
- Born: 5 March 1923
- Died: 17 August 2000 (aged 77)
- Original team: Geelong West
- Height: 187 cm (6 ft 2 in)
- Weight: 83 kg (183 lb)

Playing career^{1}
Years	Club	Games (Goals)
1946	Geelong	7 (4)
- ^{1} Playing statistics correct to the end of 1946.

Bill Tomlinson (5 March 1923 – 17 August 2000) was an Australian rules footballer who played with Geelong in the Victorian Football League (VFL).
