= Institute of Communication, Culture, Information and Technology =

Academic unit of the University of Toronto

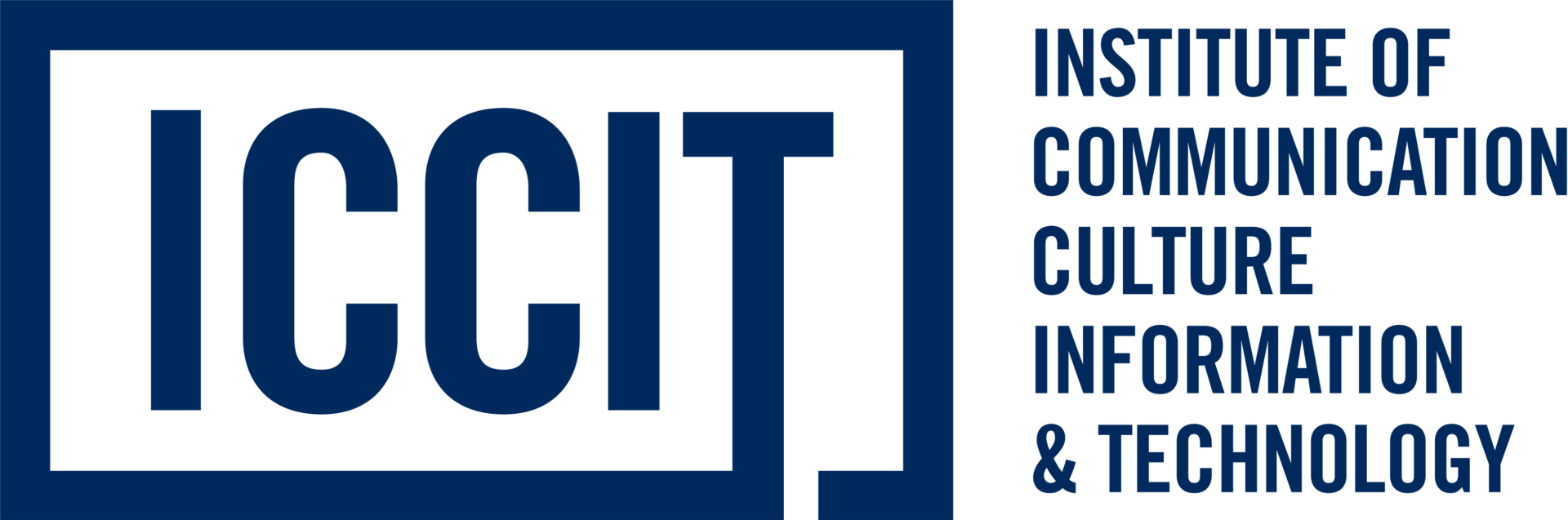
- Established: 2001; 25 years ago
- Parent institution: University of Toronto Mississauga
- Director: Brett Caraway (acting)
- Location: Mississauga, Ontario, Canada; 43°33′00″N 79°39′47″W
- Website: utm.utoronto.ca/iccit

The Institute of Communication, Culture, Information and Technology (ICCIT) is a research institute and academic unit of the University of Toronto Mississauga. ICCIT's research spans communication studies, new media, and management. It is based in the Communication, Culture and Technology Building in Mississauga, Ontario, Canada.

The institute's flagship undergraduate program, the communication, culture, information and technology (CCIT) major, was first developed in 2000; since then, ICCIT has grown to encompass four programs: CCIT; digital enterprise management; professional writing and communication; and technology, coding, and society.

== History ==
Work to create what would become the Communication, Culture, Information and Technology (CCIT) program took place from 1997 to the year 2000, as a collaborative initiative of the University of Toronto Mississauga and Sheridan College. Sheridan president Sheldon Levy and UTM's Cec Houston were instrumental in its creation. The program accepted its first students in 2001, as a joint offering between the two institutions. The Communication, Culture and Technology Building at UTM, which houses the institute, opened in 2004; funding for its construction was provided by the Ontario Superbuild fund in addition to $3 million from the City of Mississauga and other donations.

Under former director Rhonda McEwen, the institute became its own academic unit and expanded significantly. It also established a professional experience Certificate in Digital Media, Communication and Technology.

The CCIT program ceased being a joint initiative with Sheridan College in 2024. The program is now hosted fully by the University of Toronto on its Mississauga campus.

== Academics ==
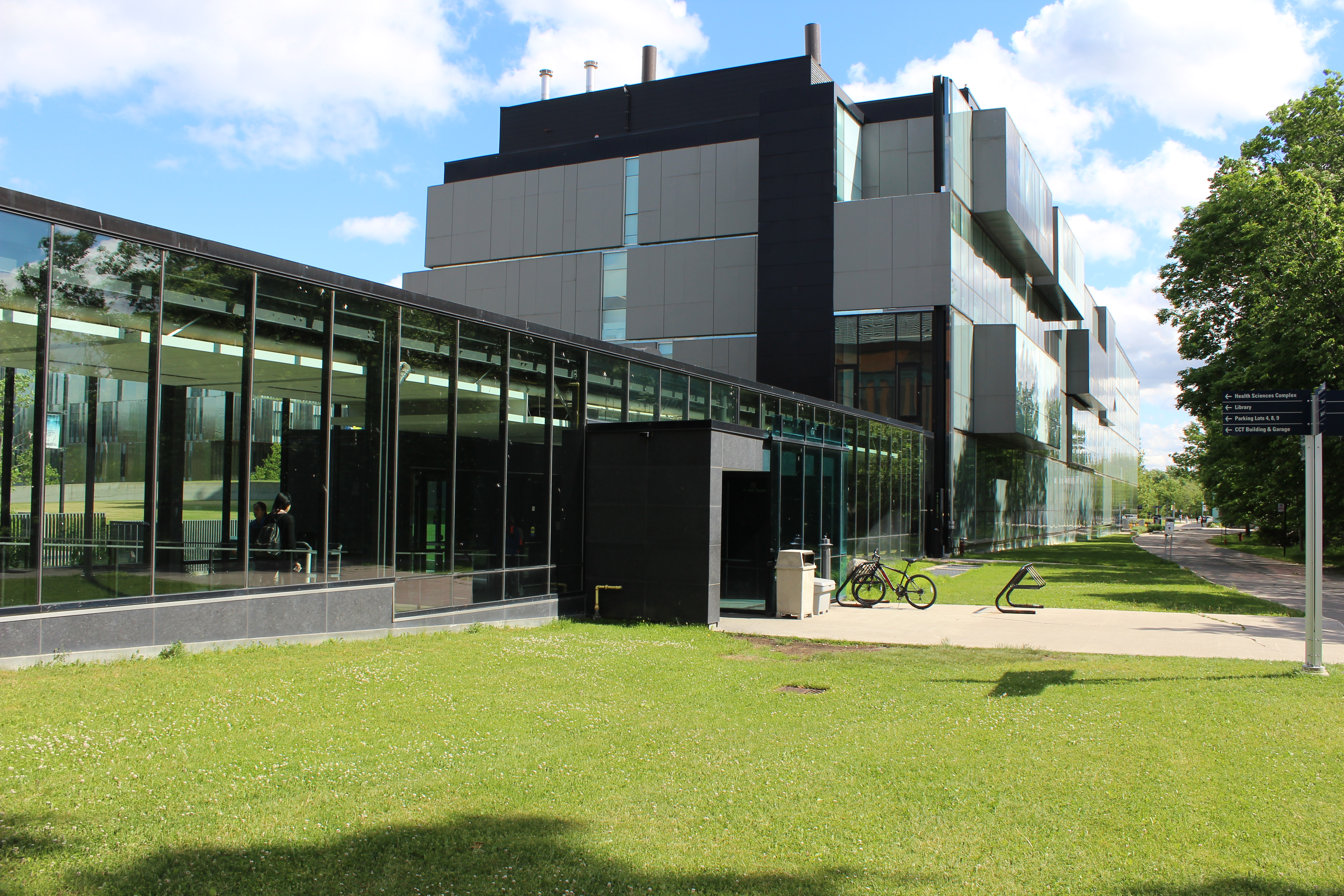
Communication, Culture and Technology (CCT) Building

=== Research ===
Research conducted by faculty in the Institute of Communication, Culture, Information and Technology covers topics including the social impact of technologies such as virtual reality (VR), cell phones and social media for youth, online content moderation, and artificial intelligence (AI).

The McEwan Mediated Communication Lab is a research lab affiliated with ICCIT for communication technology and human interaction in virtual reality. It is led by Bree McEwan.

=== Programs ===
- Communication, Culture, Information and Technology (CCIT)
- Digital Enterprise Management
- Professional Writing and Communication
- Technology, Coding, and Society

== People ==
Notable people affiliated with ICCIT include:

- Beth Coleman – professor and electronic music composer
- Sheldon Levy – former president of Sheridan College and Toronto Metropolitan University
- Rhonda McEwen – professor and former director; former dean of UTM and president of Victoria University

== See also ==
- Toronto school of communication theory
- Centre for Culture and Technology (Toronto)
- List of academic units of the University of Toronto
