= Graduate entry degree =

A graduate entry degree is term used for an academic degree that denotes a minimum 3-4 year bachelor's degree. It is most commonly used to refer to first professional degree programs. This term first developed in Australia and the UK to refer to medical, dental, and law degrees that used to be available to students directly out of high school, but now have educational business and corporations have changed structure and requirements to require a degree first before admission would be considered. There are a number of graduate entry medical programmes in the UK.

== See also ==
- Second entry degree
- First professional degree
