= Second entry degree =

A second entry degree is an academic degree that requires completion of minimum 1–2 years of university courses and at times for research oriented programs it requires 3 years. It is most commonly used to refer to programs in Canada and the United States. These programs require 3–4 years of degree-seeking work or a first professional degree or first-entry degree as a pre-requisite for admission.

== See also ==
- First professional degree
- Graduate entry
