= Bill Tomlinson =

American computer scientist

William M. "Bill" Tomlinson
- Education: Harvard College (BA), CalArts(MFA), MIT (PhD)
- Known for: Green IT; Environmental Informatics research
- Awards: 2007 NSF CAREER award 2008 Sloan Research Fellow
- Scientific career
- Fields: Informatics
- Workplaces: University of California, Irvine

William M. "Bill" Tomlinson is a professor of informatics at the University of California, Irvine, and a researcher in the California Institute for Telecommunications and Information Technology. He studies the fields of environmental informatics, human-computer interaction, multi-agent systems and computer-supported learning. His book Greening through IT (MIT Press, 2010) examines the ways in which information technology can help people think and act on the broad scales of time, space, and complexity necessary for us to address the world's current environmental issues. In addition, he has authored dozens of papers across a range of journals and conferences in computing, the learning sciences, and the law. His work has been reviewed by The Wall Street Journal, The Washington Post, the Los Angeles Times, Wired.com, Scientific American Frontiers, CNN, and the BBC. In 2007, he received an NSF CAREER award, and in 2008 he was selected as a Sloan Research Fellow. He holds an AB in biology from Harvard College, an MFA in experimental animation from CalArts, and SM and PhD degrees from the MIT Media Lab.

His animated film, Shaft of Light, screened at the 1997 Sundance Film Festival and dozens of other film festivals around the world. His 2009 paper with Andrew Torrance on patent systems has been cited in amicus briefs and in a writ filed with the United States Supreme Court.

In 2012, he promoted and led a pioneering experimental work on collaborative writing, that provided the first extensive discussion of the experiential aspects of large-scale collaborative research by documenting the collaborative development process of an academic paper written by a collective of thirty authors.

Currently his research is focused on the expanding field on disaster informatics, which deals with using information technology on limited resources in times of disaster or chaos to locate scarce resources.

== Books authored ==
Greening through IT (MIT Press, 2010)
