= Aisha Ahmad =

Canadian academic

- Born: October 29, 1980 (age 45)

Academic background
- Education: McGill University
- Thesis: Between the Mosque and the Market: an economic explanation of state failure and state formation in the modern Muslim world (2013)
- Doctoral advisor: Stephen M. Saideman

Academic work
- Discipline: Political Science
- Sub-discipline: Islam, International Relations
- Notable works: JIHAD & CO. Black Markets And Islamist Power
- Website: www.aishasahmad.com

Aisha Ahmad is a Canadian academic, and is currently an associate professor in the department of political science at the University of Toronto Scarborough. In 2022, she was elected to the Royal Society of Canada as a member of the College of New Scholars, Artists, and Scientists. She is an expert on Islam, international relations, state failure, and the political economy, and has applied her work on international security to the human impacts of the COVID-19 pandemic.
