= SCSU =

SCSU may refer to:

== Education ==
- St. Cloud State University, St. Cloud, Minnesota, USA
- Scarborough Campus Students' Union at the University of Toronto Scarborough, in Ontario, Canada
- South Carolina State University, Orangeburg, South Carolina, USA
- Southern Connecticut State University, New Haven, Connecticut, USA

== Technology ==
- Standard Compression Scheme for Unicode, a Unicode technical standard
