= Scarborough Campus =

Scarborough Campus can refer to two different university campuses:

- University of Toronto Scarborough
- Scarborough Campus (University of Hull)
