= Myrna Simpson =

Canadian research chemist

- Born: Myrna Joyce Salloum
- Education: University of Alberta
- Scientific career
- Institutions: University of Toronto Scarborough
- Thesis: Sorption of organic compounds to soil and geologic samples that vary in mineral content and diagenic properties (1999)
- Website: M Simpson Lab

Myrna Simpson is a Canadian research environmental chemist who is the Canada Research Chair in Integrative Molecular Biogeochemistry at the University of Toronto Scarborough. She is also the Associate Director of the Environmental Nuclear Magnetic Resonance Centre. Her research consider the molecular level mechanisms that underpin environmental processes, and the development of advanced analytical tools to better understand environmental health.

== Early life and education ==
Simpson became interested in chemistry and the environment during high school. She completed undergraduate studies in chemistry at the University of Alberta. After graduating, she spent a year as an analytical chemist. She became particularly interested in environmental chemistry, and eventually returned to and graduate studies at the University of Alberta. Her doctoral research considered sorption of organic compounds in soil with emphasis on how soil organic matter controlled these processes.

== Research and career ==
Simpson has demonstrated that nuclear magnetic resonance spectroscopy is of particular value when it comes to environmental research. In particular, it can be used to understand the fate of environmental pollutants and how particular ecosystems respond to climate change. In 2003, she secured funding from the Canada Foundation for Innovation to purchased Canada's first high-field NMR spectrometer for environmental research. The high-field NMR spectrometer was installed in 2004.

Through the use of NMR and different mass spectrometry (MS) techniques, Simpson furthered the understanding of environmental processes at the molecular-level. This approach provided new knowledge on how climate change and pollution impact the environment.

== Awards and honours ==
- 2003 University of Alberta Horizon Award
- 2015 International Union of Soil Sciences PM Huang Award
- 2017 University of Toronto Scarborough Faculty Research Excellence Scholar
- 2020 Appointed Canada Research Chair
- 2021 Royal Society of Chemistry Analytical Division Horizon Prize Sir George Stokes Award
- 2023 C.C. Patterson Award from the Geochemical Society
- 2023 Chemical Institute of Canada Environment Division Research and Development Dikma Award
- 2023 Geochemistry Fellow
- 2025 Fellow of the Royal Society of Canada

== Selected publications ==
- André J Simpson; Myrna J Simpson; Emma Smith; Brian P Kelleher (1 December 2007). "Microbially derived inputs to soil organic matter: are current estimates too low?". Environmental Science & Technology. 41 (23): 8070–8076. doi:10.1021/ES071217X. ISSN 0013-936X. PMID 18186339. Wikidata Q62602716.
- Xiaojuan Feng; André J. Simpson; Myrna J. Simpson (November 2005). "Chemical and mineralogical controls on humic acid sorption to clay mineral surfaces". Organic Geochemistry. 36 (11): 1553–1566. doi:10.1016/J.ORGGEOCHEM.2005.06.008. ISSN 0146-6380. Wikidata Q62602751.
- Myrna J Salloum; Benny Chefetz; Patrick G Hatcher (1 May 2002). "Phenanthrene sorption by aliphatic-rich natural organic matter". Environmental Science & Technology. 36 (9): 1953–1958. doi:10.1021/ES015796W. ISSN 0013-936X. PMID 12026977. Wikidata Q44003689.
- Simpson, Myrna J. (2014). NMR Spectroscopy : a Versatile Tool for Environmental Research. Andre J. Simpson. Hoboken: Wiley. ISBN 978-1-118-61646-8. OCLC 881417004.

== Personal life ==
Simpson is married to André J. Simpson, also a research chemist, with whom she has published several papers. They have two children.
