= Mahua Sarkar =

Indian historical sociologist

Mahua Sarkar is an Indian historical sociologist. She is a professor of sociology at University of Toronto Scarborough and previously served as the Professor of Sociology, and Women, Gender and Sexuality Studies at Binghamton University. During the 2016–17 academic year, she was France-ILO chair at the Institut des Etudes Avancées in Nantes, France. In 2011–12, she was a fellow at Re:Work, the Work and Human Life Cycle in Global History institute at Humboldt University, Berlin, and in 2013–14 she was EURIAS fellow at the Wissenschaftskolleg Berlin.

== Books ==
Sarkar is the author or editor of:

- Mahua Sarkar (ed.) Work Out of Place (2017)
- Mahua Sarkar, Visible Histories, Disappearing Women: Producing Muslim Womanhood in Late Colonial Bengal (2008).
