= Steve Joordens =

Canadian psychologist (born 1965)

- Born: August 14, 1965 (age 61)
- Education: University of New Brunswick; University of Waterloo; McMaster University
- Known for: memory, consciousness, Research Ethics, Peer-Assessment, TUse of Technology for Education, Critical Thinking
- Awards: National Technology Innovation Award,
- Scientific career
- Fields: Psychology
- Workplaces: University of Toronto

Steve Joordens is a Canadian psychologist who is professor of psychology at the University of Toronto Scarborough. He teaches introductory psychology and a seminar course on the scientific study of conscious and unconscious influences. Joordens research areas include conscious and unconscious influences, memory, and the effective use of technology for education.

== Education and career ==
Joordens earned his bachelor's degree in Psychology at the University of New Brunswick in 1989 and gained his PhD in Psychology at University of Waterloo in 1994 and postdoc at McMaster University on models and empirical studies of human memory. He is also part of the Teaching Academy at the University of Toronto (U of T). Joordens has been a faculty member of the University of Toronto Scarborough since 1995.

== Research ==
He is an active researcher in Cognitive Psychology and Educational Psychology. In the field of cognitive psychology, he primarily researches issues related to human memory and consciousness. In the field of Educational Psychology, he primarily researches issues related to peer-assessment, critical thinking, engagement, and the effective use of technology for education.

== Teaching ==
With his Ph.D. student Dwayne Pare, he co-developed peerScholar, an internet-based tool to support the development of critical thought and clear communication in any course context. In 2006 CUPE 3902, the trade union representing TAs and sessional lecturers at U of T, filed a grievance alleging that Joordens was using this programme to create a pool of "cheap labour" as a means of avoiding hiring teaching assistants to grade term work for his introductory Psychology class. In January 2009, an arbitrator upheld the grievance—noting that Joordens was indeed looking for "free" labour—and ruled that the University of Toronto needed to pay $283,000 to compensate the more than 1500 students who had been forced to work for free.

In 2018, a sexually explicit video was accidentally played at the start of a class of 500 students. It has not been determined whether Joordens was aware that the video was opened on the computer in use (or whether he even accessed the video) prior to it being displayed on the lecture screen. Shortly after the incident, on September 28 Joordens released a statement: “With respect to the event that happened prior to my class on Monday the 24th, I want to be clear that what happened was completely unintentional and I feel absolutely terrible about it. I have apologized to my class and now I want to move on. Thanks to my students, colleagues and my amazing family for their support and understanding.”

=== MOOC ===
In 2013, Joordens taught Introduction to Psychology to more than 68,000 registered students on Coursera. This course was developed as part of a $100,000 grant from the Bill & Melinda Gates Foundation. Joordens also teaches Memory and Human Lifespan Course on The Great Courses.

Joordens has been involved in using technology in online learning experiences. His online courses offer a range of psychology concepts for students to explore, incorporated with technology measures such as Digital Lab Coat, mTuner, peerScholar, and using Wikipedia as an educational tool.

=== Teaching awards ===
2012 – Ontario Confederation of University Faculty Associations Teaching Award.

2010 – President's Teaching Award, the highest teaching honour at the University of Toronto.

2009/10 – One of Ontario's top 10 post-secondary lecturers as part of Television Ontario's "Best Lecturer" competition

2009 – Joordens and Pare win 2009 National Technology Innovation Award for peerScholar.

== Society memberships ==
- Social Sciences Committee for Tuning Learning Outcomes – Higher Education Quality Council of Ontario
- Joordens is a member of the editorial board of Noetica, an electronic journal devoted to cognitive science issues.

== Selected publications ==
- Milliken, B., & Joordens, S. Negative priming without overt prime selection. Canadian Journal of Experimental Psychology
- Merikle, P. M., & Joordens, S. Measuring unconscious influences. in J. D. Cohen & J. W. Schooler (Eds.), Scientific Approaches to the Question of Consciousness: 25th Carnegie Symposium on Cognition. Hillsdale, NJ: Erlbaum.
- Merikle, P. M., Joordens, S., & Stolz, J. A. Measuring the relative magnitude of unconscious influences. Consciousness and Cognition.
- Merikle, P. M., & Joordens, S. (1997). Parallels between Perception without Attention and Perception without Awareness. Consciousness and Cognition 6, 219–236. Article No. CC970310.
- Besner, D., & Joordens, S. (1995). Wrestling with ambiguity: Further reflections. Journal of Experimental Psychology: Learning, Memory, and Cognition, 21, 515–519
- Joordens, S., & Besner, D. (1994). When banking on meaning is not (yet) money in the bank: Explorations in connectionist modeling. Journal of Experimental Psychology: Learning, Memory, and Cognition, 20, 1–12.
- Buchanan, L., Joordens, S., Thagard, P., & Fleck, R. (1993). Visual analogies and mental rotation. Proceedings of the Fifteenth Annual Meeting of the Cognitive Sciences Society.
- Joordens, S., & Merikle, P. M. (1993). Independence or Redundancy? Two models of conscious and unconscious influences. Journal of Experimental Psychology: General, 122, 462–467.
- Joordens, S., & Besner, D. (1992). Priming effects that span an intervening unrelated word: Implications for models of memory representation and retrieval. Journal of Experimental Psychology: Learning, Memory, and Cognition, 18, 483–491.
- Joordens, S., & Merikle, P. M. (1992). False recognition and perception without awareness. Memory & Cognition, 20, 151–159.
