= Dan Lang Field =

Baseball diamond at the University of Toronto Scarborough

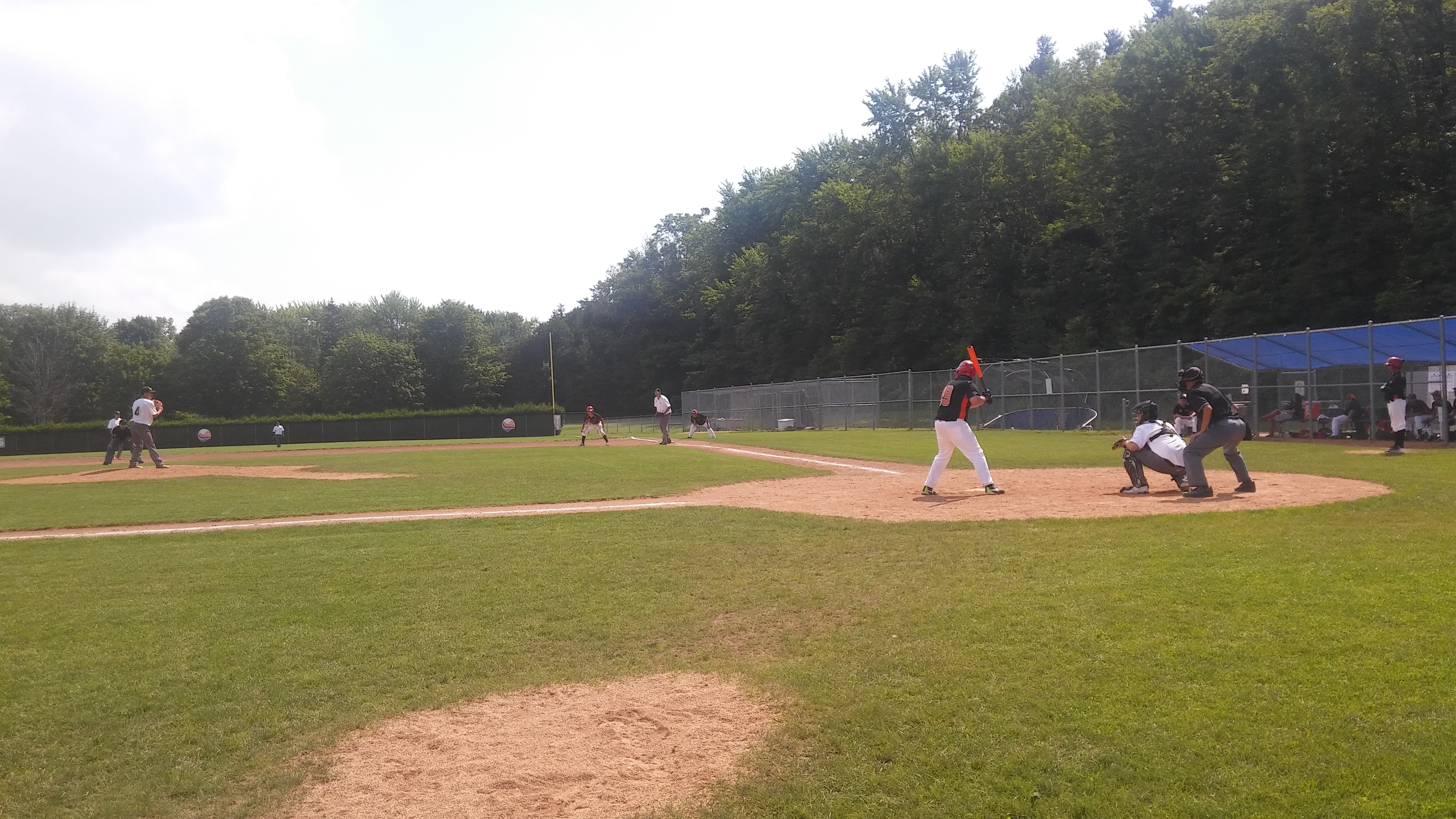
- Interactive map of Dan Lang Field
- Address: 130 Old Kingston Road, Toronto, Ontario, Canada
- Location: University of Toronto Scarborough
- Coordinates: 43.7785°N 79.1817°W
- Owner: University of Toronto
- Capacity: 150
- Scoreboard: Electronic

Construction
- Opened: 2007

Tenants
- Toronto Varsity Blues (U Sports); Ontario Blue Jays (CPBL)

Website
- utsc.utoronto.ca/athletics/valley

Dan Lang Field is a baseball diamond of the University of Toronto, located on its Scarborough campus in Toronto, Ontario, Canada. It is home to the Varsity Blues baseball team. Part of the Varsity Blues Ballpark, the venue is named for Dan Lang, the longest standing head baseball coach for the Varsity Blues.

== Overview ==
The idea for a permanent Varsity Blues baseball facility was floated by the University of Toronto in 2004, and following a fundraising campaign, the UTSC Field was opened in 2007 with a seating capacity of 150 people.

It was named the Dan Lang Field in 2010 in honour of long-standing Varsity Blues baseball coach Dan Lang, who also played a role in the field's construction, following his retirement. It is located on the southern end of the Scarborough campus in the Highland Creek valley area, near other outdoor athletic facilities including soccer fields and tennis and beach volleyball courts.

In addition to serving as the practice field for the Varsity Blues, the field is also used by the Ontario Blue Jays baseball club in the Canadian Premier Baseball League.

== See also ==
- Toronto Pan Am Sports Centre
