= Thy Phu =

Canadian academic

Thy Phu is a Canadian author and academic who is a distinguished professor of race, diaspora and visual justice at the University of Toronto.

== Education ==
Phu has a master's degree in English from McMaster University, and a PhD from the University of California Berkeley.

She undertook a postdoctoral fellowship at the University of Toronto.

== Career ==
Phu is a professor of media studies at the University of Toronto Scarborough, where she is also a distinguished professor of race, diaspora and visual justice.

She was previously faculty at Western University and taught at the National University of Singapore as well as Yale University.

She is the director of The Family Camera Network, a research project that supports local communities to create antiracist public archive photography. She co-founded the Critical Refugee Studies Network of Canada, and she is a co-editor of Trans Asia Photography journal.

She is an elected member of the Royal Society of Canada's College of New Scholars, Artists, and Scientists.

== Selected publications ==
She has written and co-edited four books:

- Picturing Model Citizens: Civility in Asian American Visual Culture, 2011, Temple University Press ISBN 978-1439907214 (author)
- Feeling Photography, 2014, Duke University Press ISBN 978-0822355410 (edited)
- Refugee States: Critical Refugee Studies in Canada, 2021, University of Toronto Press ISBN 978-1487508647 (edited)
- Warring Visions: Vietnam and Photography, 2022, Duke University Press ISBN 978-1478010753 (author)
