= Elizabeth Dhuey =

Economist specializing in education policy

- Awards: Sylvia Ostry Award (2025)

Academic background
- Education: University of Colorado Boulder (BA); University of California, Santa Barbara (MA, PhD)

Academic work
- Discipline: Economics
- Sub-discipline: Economics of education, education policy, labour economics
- Institutions: University of Toronto
- Website: elizabethdhuey.com

Elizabeth Dhuey is an economist and professor of economics at the University of Toronto. Her research is in the economics of education and public policy, with a focus on early childhood education, special education identification and finance, age at school entry, school organization and leadership, and education and workforce development. She is director of the Toronto Region Statistics Canada Research Data Centre and co-director of Equity in Education Canada.

== Education and academic career ==
Dhuey received a Bachelor of Arts in economics and sociology from the University of Colorado Boulder in 1999. She received a Master of Arts in economics in 2002 and a PhD in economics in 2007 from the University of California, Santa Barbara.

She joined the Department of Management at University of Toronto Scarborough as an assistant professor in 2007, became an associate professor in 2014, and was promoted to professor in 2024. Her graduate appointment is in the Department of Leadership, Higher and Adult Education at the Ontario Institute for Studies in Education. She also holds cross-appointments in several policy and social science units at the University of Toronto.

In July 2023, Dhuey began a five-year term as director of the Toronto Region Statistics Canada Research Data Centre. She previously served as academic director of the Research Initiative on Education + Skills and as the inaugural chair of the Canadian Women Economists Committee. She was a recipient of the 2025 CWEC/CFÉC Sylvia Ostry Award, which recognizes contributions to advancing women in the economics profession.

Dhuey co-directs Equity in Education Canada, a research group focused on inequities in early childhood education and care, formal education, and youth training.

== Research ==
Dhuey's research often uses large administrative datasets and quasi-experimental methods to examine how institutional design, resource allocation, and public policy affect educational and economic outcomes.

Her early work with Kelly Bedard examined the relationship between students' age relative to their classmates and educational outcomes across countries, as well as the effects of school-entry policies on skill accumulation. With Stephen Lipscomb, she studied relative age in special education identification. Later work with David Figlio, Krzysztof Karbownik, and Jeffrey Roth examined school-starting age and cognitive development from childhood through age 18.

Her other research has examined grade-level configuration, the contribution of school principals to student achievement, and the design and distribution of special education funding.

Her work on early childhood and family policy includes research on full-day kindergarten and maternal labour supply, public investment in early childhood education and care in Canada, and approaches to teaching interpersonal problem-solving skills in early childhood settings.

Dhuey's research on relative age was featured in a 2012 episode of 60 Minutes. The program also discussed Malcolm Gladwell's use of her research in his book Outliers.

== Selected publications ==
- Bedard, Kelly; Dhuey, Elizabeth (2006). "The Persistence of Early Childhood Maturity: International Evidence of Long-Run Age Effects". The Quarterly Journal of Economics. 121 (4): 1437–1472. doi:10.1093/qje/121.4.1437.
- Dhuey, Elizabeth; Lipscomb, Stephen (2010). "Disabled or Young? Relative Age and Special Education Diagnoses in Schools". Economics of Education Review. 29 (5): 857–872. doi:10.1016/j.econedurev.2010.03.006.
- Dhuey, Elizabeth; Smith, Justin (2014). "How Important Are School Principals in the Production of Student Achievement?". Canadian Journal of Economics. 47 (2): 634–663. doi:10.1111/caje.12086.
- Dhuey, Elizabeth; Figlio, David; Karbownik, Krzysztof; Roth, Jeffrey (2019). "School Starting Age and Cognitive Development". Journal of Policy Analysis and Management. 38 (3): 538–578. doi:10.1002/pam.22135.
- Dhuey, Elizabeth; Lamontagne, Jessie; Zhang, Tingting (2021). "Full-Day Kindergarten: Effects on Maternal Labor Supply". Education Finance and Policy. 16 (4): 533–557. doi:10.1162/edfp_a_00321. hdl:10419/207333.
- Kolbe, Tammy; Dhuey, Elizabeth; Doutre, Sara Menlove (2023). "Unequal and Increasingly Unfair: How Federal Policy Creates Disparities in Special Education Funding". Exceptional Children. 90 (1): 57–75. doi:10.1177/00144029221148784.
- Dhuey, Elizabeth (2024). "Will the Increased Investment in Early Childhood Education and Care in Canada Pay Off? It Depends!". Canadian Public Policy. 50 (S1): 103–126. doi:10.3138/cpp.2023-061.
- McMullen, Evelyn; Perlman, Michal; Burns, Samantha; Falenchuk, Olesya; White, Linda; Dhuey, Elizabeth (2026). "Teaching Interpersonal Problem-Solving Skills to Young Children in Early Childhood Education and Care (ECEC) Settings: An Integration of Evidence". Review of Educational Research. doi:10.3102/00346543251399668.
