= Maydianne Andrade =

Jamaican-born Canadian ecologist

Maydianne C.B. Andrade
- Born: Jamaica
- Education: Simon Fraser University (BSc); University of Toronto (MSc); Cornell University (PhD)
- Spouse: Andrew Mason
- Scientific career
- Fields: Evolutionary Ecology
- Workplaces: University of Toronto

Maydianne C.B. Andrade is a Jamaican-born Canadian evolutionary ecologist at the University of Toronto Scarborough. She is known for her work on the mating habits of spiders, in particular spiders belonging to Black Widow spiders, the Latrodectus genus. In 2007, she was named a Canadian Research Chair in Integrative Behavioural Ecology.

== Early life and education ==
Andrade was born in Kingston, Jamaica and immigrated with her parents to Vancouver, Canada when she was three years old.

Andrade earned her BSc in 1992 from Simon Fraser University before pursuing a MSc in zoology in 1995 from the University of Toronto while studying on its Mississauga campus. Her MSc thesis was entitled "Mating behavior and constraints on reproductive success in a spider with male sexual sacrifice". Andrade then gained her PhD from Cornell University in 2000 under the co-supervision of Stephen T. Emlen and Paul W. Sherman, investigating "Sexual selection and male mating behavior in a cannibalistic spider."

== Career ==
Andrade was appointed dean of the Faculty of Science at York University for a five-year term starting January 1, 2026.

=== Research ===
Andrade is a professor at the University of Toronto Scarborough, where she researches how the reproductive behaviours of males and females evolve through the interaction of sexual and natural selection in different ecological contexts. Her best known work is about the mating habits of Australian redback spiders where the most successful males often increase the amount of time they spend mating while being cannibalized by female redbacks.

She is the Canada Research Chair in Integrative Behavioural Ecology and is the vice-dean of faculty affairs and equity at U of T Scarborough. Andrade serves as special adviser to the dean at U of T Scarborough. She has published over 75 academic publications, which have been cited over 4,000 times, resulting in a h-index and i10-index of 39 and 60 respectively.

=== Public engagement ===
In 2005, Andrade was named one of the Brilliant 10 by Popular Science magazine. She appeared in the second episode of Season 4 of Nova ScienceNow. In 2020 Andrade was featured in and presented an episode of CBC's The Nature of Things with David Suzuki about recent discoveries at the Burgess Shale, called "First Animals", and was interviewed for Quirks & Quarks on her research and work towards racial equity in STEM. She was the 2021 Carleton University's Discovery Lecturer. Andrade also hosts the weekly podcast "The New Normal."

Andrade is the co-founder and president of the Canadian Black Scientists Network, and recently led the group to host a virtual conference, called BE‑STEMM 2022, to highlight Black Canadians in the fields of science, technology, engineering, mathematics and medicine. Over 1,500 individuals were in attendance. Andrade also co-chairs the Toronto Initiative for Diversity and Excellence, and serves on the Steering Committee for the University of Toronto's Black Research Network.

== Personal life ==
She works in a lab adjacent to that of her husband, Andrew Mason.

== Selected academic publications ==
- Maydianne C.B. Andrade. Sexual selection for male sacrifice in the Australian redback spider. Science. 1996.
- Maydianne C.B. Andrade. Risky mate search and male self-sacrifice in redback spiders. Behavioral Ecology. 2003.
- Damian O Elias, Michael M Kasumovic, David Punzalan, Maydianne CB Andrade, Andrew C Mason. Assessment during aggressive contests between male jumping spiders. Animal behaviour. 2008.
