= Diana Valencia =

Colombian physicist

- Born: 1978 (age 47–48); Bogota, Colombia
- Education: University of Toronto (BA, MSc); Harvard University
- Known for: Super-Earths, Mini-Neptunes
- Scientific career
- Fields: Super-Earths, Mini-Neptunes
- Workplaces: University of Toronto, Scarborough
- Doctoral advisor: Richard J. O’Connell and Dimitar D. Sasselov

Diana Valencia (born 1978) is a Colombian planetary scientist and astrophysicist. She is an associate professor of Physics and Astrophysics, University of Toronto Scarborough, and of Astronomy & Astrophysics, University of Toronto Faculty of Arts and Science.

Valencia’s research characterizes planets with masses between gas giants and Earth’s.

== Biography ==
Diana Valencia immigrated from Colombia to Canada with her parents when she was studying a B.S. in Physics from University of Los Andes, Colombia. Though from a family of engineers, she intended to become a historian or economist in Colombia. Ultimately, she was influenced by her chemical engineer mother, despite her mother's misogynistic experiences in Colombia. Once in Canada, she realized there were career opportunities for women in the sciences and earned a B.A., then M.S. in Physics at University of Toronto. Valencia was inspired to apply for post-graduate programs and was accepted into Harvard University as a doctoral student.

== Selected academic work ==
In 2006, Valencia's first major publication, "Internal Structure of Massive Terrestrial Planets", proposed the first mass-radius relationship for rocky exoplanets that associated mass, radius, and internal structure of solid planets more massive than Earth.

2007's publication, "Radius and Structure Models of the First Super-Earth Planet", recognized that exoplanets of different compositions would have different mass and radius measurements as quantified by degeneracy pressures, including exoplanets with iron cores, rocky mantles, and icy/liquid shells.

Recognizing that human interest in the habitability of extra-solar planets drives much of their investigation, and that plate tectonics plays an important role in life on Earth, another 2007 publication, "Inevitability of Plate Tectonics on Super-Earths", was the first published investigation to propose that larger-massed terrestrial planets should experience plate tectonics due to thinner, weaker lithospheres and higher stresses.

In 2013, "Bulk Composition of GJ 1214b and Other Sub-Neptunian Exoplanets", attempts to show an atmospheric exoplanet's composition was attained based on planetary mass and radius, and its evolution and internal characteristics.

2018’s "Habitability from Tidally Induced Tectonics" introduced the mechanism of vertical recycling of carbon through a planet's volcanic activity and sequestered carbon onto, and with, the basaltic oceanic crust settling ("foundering") and re-entering the mantle. This heat-pipe tectonism is equivalent to Earth's plate tectonics, enabling carbon-silicate cycling, thereby maintaining Earth habitable for billions of years.

"Can a Machine Learn the Outcome of Planetary Collisions?", published 2019, explores improved methods of predicting the outcome of planetary collisions thought to be important in the last stages of planet formation. This machine learning approach seems a promising avenue. The methodology identifies variables needing further investigation to build better predictive models as large ratio of target to impactor masses and low velocities.

== Recognition ==
- 2008 Poincaré Postdoctoral Fellowship at Observatoire de la Côte d'Azur, Nice, France
- Alumna of the Origins of Life Institute, department of Earth and Planetary Sciences, Harvard University
- 2010 Sagan NASA Postdoctoral Fellow
- 2021 International Paolo Farinella Prize, awarded by the European Planetary Society for her significant contributions in our understanding of the interior structure and dynamics of terrestrial and super-Earth exoplanets. This prize was shared with Lena Noack.
