= Emily Agard =

Canadian immunologist

- Education: Queen's University, University of Toronto
- Occupations: Scientist, Immunologist, Professor
- Known for: Director of SciXchange, 2018 Honouree 100 Accomplished Black Canadian Women

Emily Agard is an instructor of Immunology at Toronto Metropolitan University. She is the current Director of SciXchange, the center for outreach, science communication, and public engagement within the Faculty of Science, and is the Toronto Chapter Ambassador for Technovation Girls. Agard has a B.Sc. in Life Sciences from Queen's University, and a Ph.D. in Immunology from the University of Toronto.

== Education ==
Agard attended Queen's University in Kingston, Ontario where she received a Bachelors of Science. Agard has said that she initially planned to go to law school but changed her mind and decided to pursue science after taking two elective courses in immunology. In 2004, Agard completed a Ph.D. in Immunology with the University of Toronto. She recently earned a certificate in photography from the Chang School of Continuing Education.

== Career ==
=== Teaching ===
Agard taught biology at the University of Toronto Scarborough and York University before joining the Faculty of Science at Toronto Metropolitan University, where she is now an Associate Professor and teaches immunology. Agard supports expansion of teaching and learning of STEM subjects beyond a formal classroom environment and making science accessible.

=== SciXchange ===
SciXchange is the outreach office for the Faculty of Science at Toronto Metropolitan University, with Agard as the current director. SciXchange focuses on accessible science communication and programming at a community level, and since 2018 has brought interactive science programs to over 7,600 youth. In a feature article for the HERStory in Black project with CBC, Agard said the focus of the program is making science accessible and engaging for everyone, particularly young children and students. SciXchange operates subprograms such as Soapbox Science, which promotes the work of women and non-binary scientists, as well as Eureka Camp, a summer camp which combines science, engineering, and sports and is accessible to children and families with financial needs. SciXchange also offers the Stoodis Future Scientist Program which is dedicated to STEM engagement with First Nations, Inuit, and Métis secondary school students. Agard has said that in inviting students to campus and providing experience in a lab is where the SciXchange team has seen a positive shift in students being able to envision themselves as having a future career in science. In becoming director of SciXchange, Agard said that moving into outreach was “a big leap of faith” as it meant moving out of research permanently. This change in direction also took her out of the running for tenure.

=== Technovation Girls ===
As of August 2021, Agard is the current chapter ambassador for the Toronto chapter of Technovation Girls, a global nonprofit organization dedicated to involving girls ages 10 to 18 in technology entrepreneurship.
