= Brenda Beck =

Canadian anthropologist

Dr. Brenda E.F. Beck (born c. 1940), also known as Brindha Beck, is a Canadian anthropologist and exporter of Tamil culture. She has published eight books and authored over sixty journal articles and is a key figure in raising awareness of Tamil culture in Toronto, Canada, where many Tamil Indians settled after the Tamil Diaspora. She lived for two years in Olapalayam near Kangayam, in the southern Indian State of Tamil Nadu. She spent two years there for her doctorate in anthropology, awarded by the University of Oxford (Somerville College). The title of the thesis was Social and conceptual order in Koṅku. She published her research in a book under the title of Peasant Society in Koňku.

She is an adjunct professor in Anthropology department in the field of South Asian folklore at the University of Toronto Scarborough.

== Biography ==
=== Early life and education ===
Beck was 14 when her father, who worked in Beirut, Lebanon, drove Beck and her family around Syria, Turkey, the Kingdom of Afghanistan, the Dominion of Pakistan, and India. Beck's earliest encounter with Tamil culture was a drive from Coimbatore to Tiruchirappalli in Madras State (now Tamil Nadu) of southern India.

In 1964, Beck returned to Madras State to complete her doctorate in anthropology (conducted at Somerville College, Oxford). While living in the village of Olapalayam (near Kangayam in present-day Tiruppur district, Tamil Nadu), she learned how to speak a "smattering" of Tamil language. There, she not only learned their customs and culture but also adopted some of it as well. In Olapalayam, Beck is known by her Indianized name, Brindha. She is also known to wear a sari and a Kongu thaali, also known as a mangala sutra, or nuptial chain which women wear to signify their married status.

In February 1965, Beck first heard the village bards narrating the Annanmaar Kadhai - which translates literally to The Elder Brothers' Story. It is the epic tale of triplets, two brothers known as Ponnar and Shankar, and their younger sister. The story spans over centuries and takes place in the Kongu region, where Beck lived and studied. The folktale, which has been passed from generations through song, speech, and dance, was thought to be set in the medieval period between 1000 and 1300 C.E.

With their permission, Beck recorded the story. It took a total of 38 hours to perform over 18 nights. In addition, Beck collected over 20,000 pages of folk stories and traditions in her two years at Olapalayam. Beck said about the experience, "It was magical. I recorded the story in my cassettes and when I ran out of blank ones, I erased my collection of North American folk songs to keep the recording going." These same recordings continue to aid Beck's research.

=== Work and career ===
In 1992, along with Indo-Canadian animator and artist Ravichandran Arumugam, whose grandfather used to sing the legend, Beck helped translate and create an illustrated two-volume book of the Annamaar Kadhai in Tamil and English. She also created graphic novels and a thirteen-hour, twenty-six episode animated series for children regarding the epic, known as the Elder Brothers' Story: An Oral Epic of Tamil, also known as The Legend of Ponnivala or Ponnar Shankar. They were published by the Institute of Asian Studies, Chennai. There is now an online version available that provides activities for kids such as coloring books and audiobooks to "intended to entertain as well as to educate".

Beck helped develop an app to teach Tamil to students in Toronto, which has a large population of Tamil Indians. The app took eight months to develop and was released in 2016. In the same year, Beck donated $10,000 to Tamil Studies at the University of Toronto.

Then, in 2018, Beck created two funds known as the Brenda Beck Tamil Programming Fund and the Brenda Beck Tamil Digital Fund. These were created to "invest and distribute funds to programming and the digitization of archives". Beck also donated a $327,000 gift to support these programs. Later that year, on September 1 and 2, Beck hosted the Family Reunion of the Kongu Association in Manassas, Virginia. Beck spent time lecturing about the Annamaar Kadhai, describing its origins, and comparing it to other folk tales in the Kongu Nadu region.

Beck continues to research the Tamil Diaspora or the migration of Tamil Indians throughout the globe. Scarborough has one of the largest populations of Tamil Indians outside of South Asia.

Currently, Beck serves as president of the Sophia Hilton Foundation of Canada, a charity that "promotes the use of storytelling at all educational levels". Beck hopes that with the work of the University of Toronto Scholars and input of the Scarborough Tamil community, there will be further strides in Tamil research and cultural preservation. She also hopes to bring the tale of Ponnivala and thus Tamil culture into classrooms for increased accessibility for young students.

In 2019, with Beck's assistance and input, the University of Toronto at Scarborough's held its first Tamil Heritage Month celebration. The performance was unique in that it was performed as a Villu Paattu, which translates to "bow-song". It is described as a "musical technique that combines narration and a 10-foot bow-string struck for rhythm".

Eighteen (18) performers made history by illustrating parts of the legend. It was the first time two ancient Tamil arts came together – an ancient tale told in a musical storytelling form too old to accurately date. Beck says about the story, "It is something that should be shared internationally, and it's something that Tamils can be proud of".

== Research publications ==
Beck has published her works in several journals, including Anthropologica, Current Anthropology, Journal of South Asian Literature, The Journal of Asian Studies, and Western Folklore.

Some of her published works include Body Imagery of the Tamil Proverbs of South India, The Metaphor as a Mediator Between Semantic and Analogic Modes of Thought, The Logical Appropriation of Kinship as a Political Metaphor: An Indian Epic at the Civilizational and Regional Levels, The Right-Left Division of South Indian Society, The Three Twins: The Telling of a South Indian Folk Epic, and a translation of A Praise-Poem for Murugan.
