= Watts Lectures =

The F. B. Watts Memorial Lectures, commonly known as the Watts Lectures, is a series of public lectures held several times annually at the University of Toronto Scarborough (UTSC). It was established in 1970 and named after Fred Watts, a former professor of geography at the University of Toronto and founding member of the Scarborough campus, initially known as Scarborough College, who died a year before the inception of the lecture series. The series was inaugurated by Lester B. Pearson, former Prime Minister of Canada.

== List of lecturers ==
- 1970 — Lester B. Pearson, "Partners in Development"
- 1971 — Noel Annan, Baron Annan, "What Is a University For Anyway?"
- 1974 — Gerhard Herzberg, "Science & Society"
- 1975 — Raymond Moriyama, "Can Your Life Become a Work of Art?"
- 1976 — David Lewis, "Corporate Power Today: The Image and the Reality"
- 1978 — John Diefenbaker
- 1981 — Mordecai Richler
- 1982 — J. M. S. Careless
- 1982 — Flora MacDonald
- 1983 — Alfonso García Robles
- 1983 — Hans Küng
- 1984 — David Suzuki
- 1985 — Stephen Lewis
- 1986 — Bob White
- 1988 — Thomas R. Berger
- 1990 — Edwin Mirvish
- 1991 — Georges Erasmus
- 1992 — Judy Rebick
- 1993 — Major-General Lewis MacKenzie
- 1994 — Abdullah Abdullah and Itzhak Shelef
- 1995 — Roberta Bondar
- 1999 — David Phillips
- 2000 — Roberta Jamieson
- 2001 — Mark Tewksbury
- 2002 — Bob Rae
- 2003 — Preston Manning
- 2004 — Joe Schlesinger
- 2005 — Dr. James Orbinski
- 2005 — Dr. Sheela Basrur
- 2011 — Roméo Dallaire
- 2012 — David Suzuki
- 2014 — Jane Goodall
- 2019 — Beverley McLachlin

== See also ==
- Massey Lectures
