= Lawrence Bloomberg Faculty of Nursing =

Nursing school of the University of Toronto

Coordinates: 43°39′33″N 79°23′34″W

- Other name: Lawrence S. Bloomberg Faculty of Nursing
- Former name: Faculty of Nursing (1933–2007)
- Type: Public nursing school
- Established: 1933; 93 years ago
- Parent institution: University of Toronto
- Dean: Robyn Stremler
- Students: 500
- Location: Toronto, Ontario, Canada
- Website: bloomberg.nursing.utoronto.ca

The Lawrence S. Bloomberg Faculty of Nursing is the nursing school of the University of Toronto. Established in 1933, it is based in the Health Sciences Building in the Discovery District of downtown Toronto, and operates programs on all three of the university's campuses: St. George, Mississauga, and Scarborough.

== History ==
The University of Toronto has provided nursing education since 1920, when educator E. Kathleen Russell established the former Department of Public Health Nursing with funding from the Rockefeller Foundation. Prior in 1905, the Graduate Nurses' Association of Ontario submitted a memorandum requesting that the University of Toronto offer a course of training and education for nurses, the first documented evidence of efforts to establish university education for nurses in Canada. The School of Nursing as it exists today was founded when the department merged with the School of Hygiene in 1933, with Russell at its first director. Following her vision of progressive reform in nursing education, it hosted the first four-year Bachelor of Science in Nursing (BScN) program in Canada.

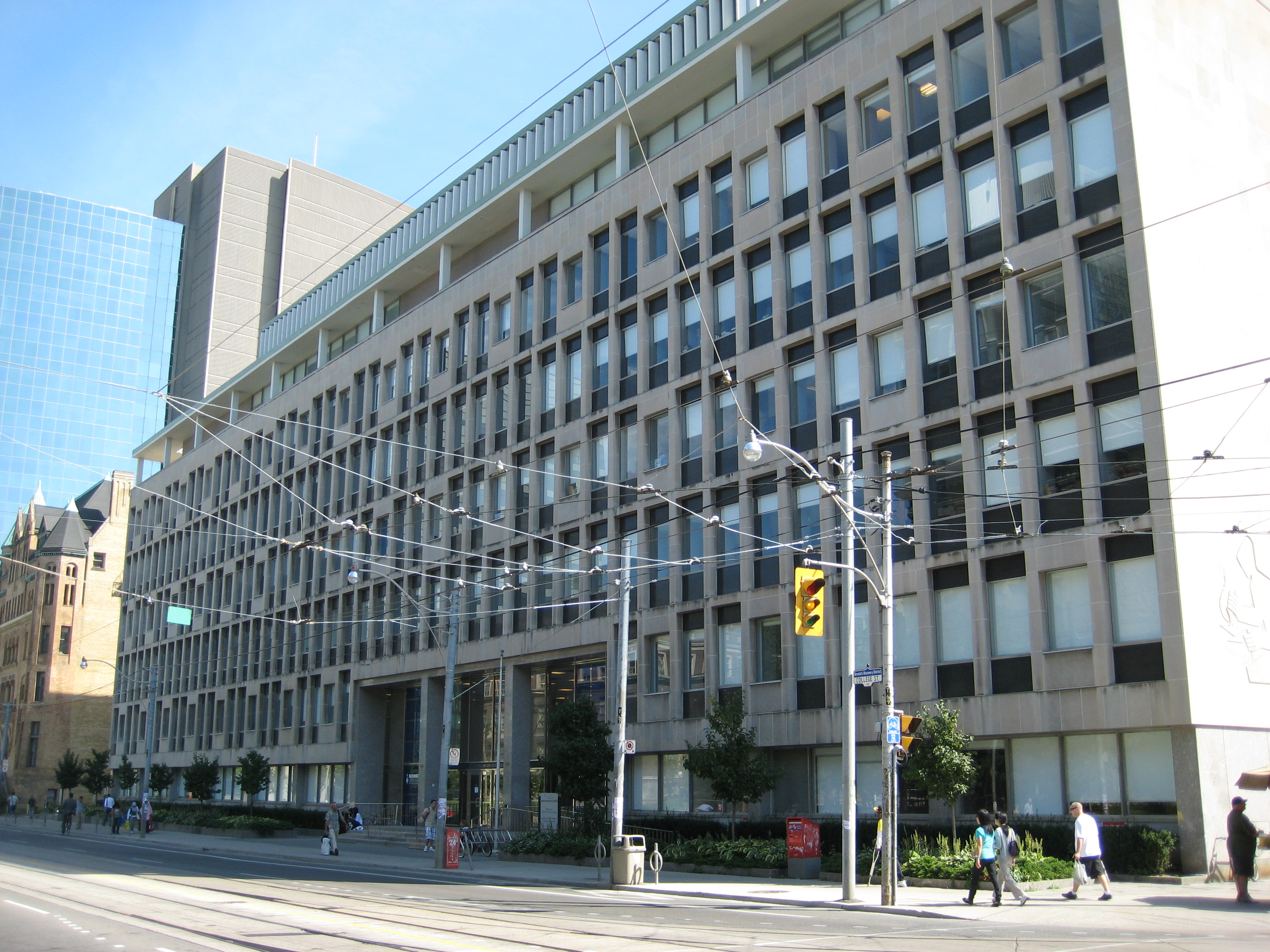
The Health Sciences Building on College Street in Toronto

The first integrated nursing degree program in Canada was started at the University of Toronto in 1942, where nursing faculty had control over education at the university and the teaching within the hospitals. That same year, Kathleen Russell chaired the first meeting of the Provisional Council of University Schools and Departments of Nursing (PCUSDN), as one of 11 representatives from university schools of nursing. During the 1940s, Toronto was one of five Canadian universities offering nursing degrees, alongside McGill University, Université de Montréal, University of Western Ontario and Université Laval. The University of Toronto's first masters program in nursing was established in 1975 and its first doctoral program in 1993.

In 2007, Lawrence Bloomberg made a $10-million gift to the faculty, the largest private donation to a nursing school in Canada at the time. The faculty was named the Lawrence S. Bloomberg Faculty of Nursing in his honour.

=== Tri-campus expansion ===
In September 2026, the faculty expanded its undergraduate nursing (BScN) program to its Mississauga campus and opened a new cohort of its nurse practitioner specialization at the Scarborough Academy of Medicine and Integrated Health (SAMIH) on its Scarborough campus. These expansions to the University of Toronto's suburban sites follow population growth in the Greater Toronto Area and demand for an increased number of health care professionals.

== Programs ==
Bloomberg Nursing offers a Bachelor of Science in Nursing (BScN) as its only undergraduate program. Graduate programs offered by the faculty through the School of Graduate Studies include:

- Master of Nursing (MN), with clinical nursing, health systems leadership and administration, and nurse practitioner specializations
- Post-Master Nurse Practitioner Diploma (PMNP)
- Collaborative Specializations for Master's and Doctoral Students
- Doctor of Philosophy (PhD)
- Doctor of Nursing (DN)

== Reputation ==
The University of Toronto was ranked fourth in the world and first among public institutions in North America for nursing in Quacquarelli Symonds' QS World University Rankings by Subject 2025, below Johns Hopkins University, the University of Pennsylvania, and King's College London.

== See also ==
- Nursing in Canada
- History of nursing
- Dalla Lana School of Public Health
- Leslie Dan Faculty of Pharmacy
- University of Toronto Faculty of Medicine
