= Stephen M. Saideman =

Canadian political scientist

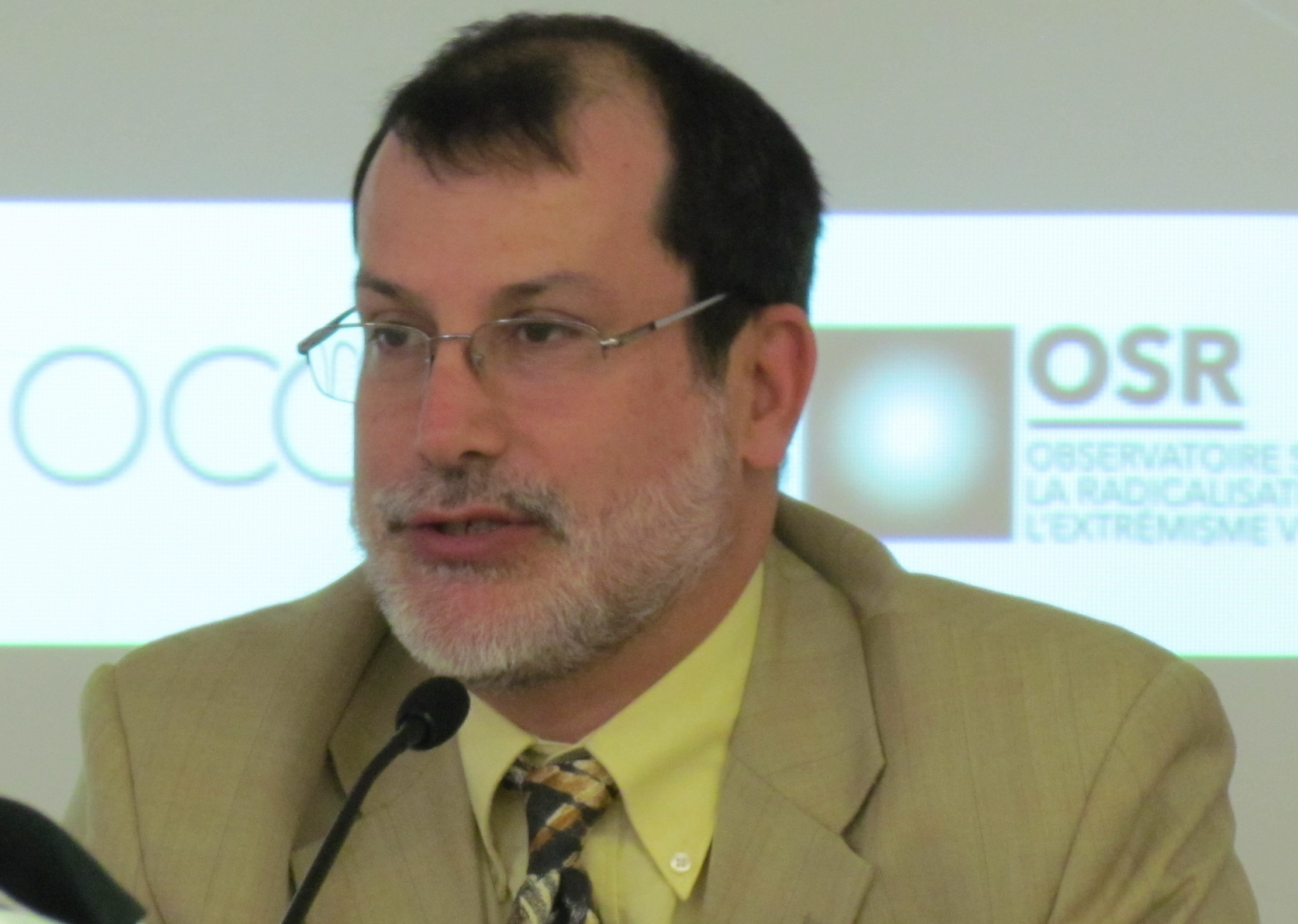
Steve Saideman in May 2015

Stephen M. Saideman is a political scientist who holds the Paterson Chair in International Affairs at Norman Paterson School of International Affairs at Carleton University in Ottawa, Canada. He has been the Canada Research Chair in International Security and Ethnic Conflict at McGill University, in Montreal. He has written four books as well as articles and book chapters. His work has focused on the international relations of ethnic conflict, and comparative civil-military relations.

== Career ==
Saideman received his BA in government at Oberlin College. He then received his MA and Ph.D. in political science from the University of California, San Diego in the fall of 1993. He had a visiting position at the University of Vermont before moving to Texas Tech where he taught as an assistant professor of Political Science from 1995 to 2001. From 2001 to 2002, he held the Council on Foreign Relations International Affairs Fellowship, which allowed him to work as a desk officer on the US Joint Staff's Directorate of Strategic Plans and Policy (J5). Saideman then taught at McGill as a Canada Research Chair until the end of the spring semester of 2012 when he moved to teach at the Norman Paterson School of International Affairs of Carleton University.

== Research ==
Most of his research has focused on the international relations of ethnic conflict, including his first and second books. This led to some projects on the comparative politics of ethnic conflict as well as an interest in the dynamics of intrastate conflicts in general. His current research focuses on the dynamics of civil-military relations in the world's democracies. He co-authored, along with David Auerswald, a book entitled NATO and Afghanistan: Fighting Together, Fighting Alone. His most recent book is "Adapting in the Dust: Learning Lessons from Canada's War in Afghanistan."

== Teaching ==
Saideman has taught a range of courses in International Relations, focusing on International Security. He supervises MA and Ph.D. students working on a range of issues, including variations in public support for terrorist groups in advanced democracies, sources of militia strategies, under what conditions peacekeeping operations successfully deter violence, and what causes spatial variations in violence in riots.
