= University of Toronto Scarborough =

University of Toronto campus in Scarborough, Canada

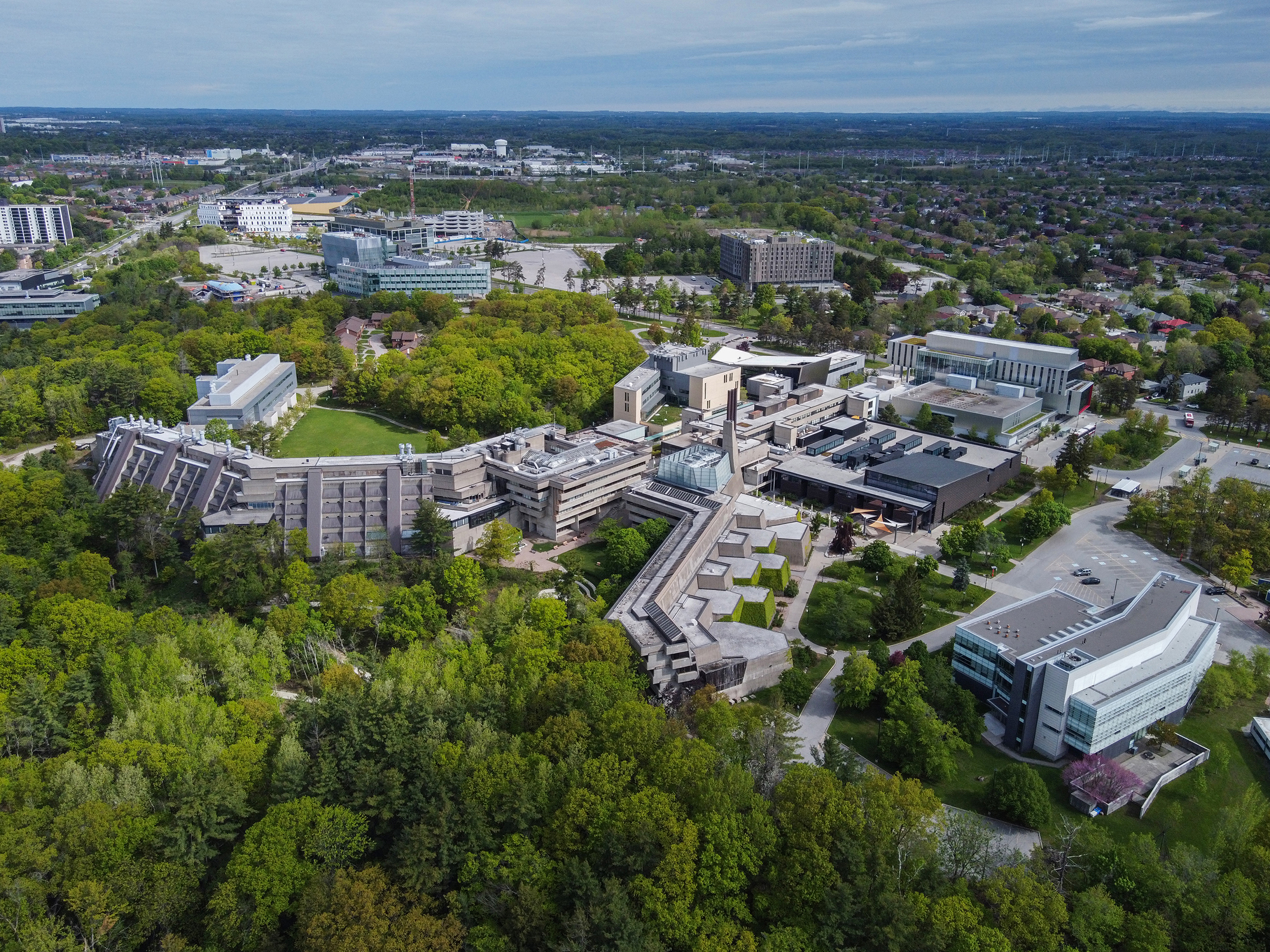
- Aerial view of the campus in 2025
- Other name: Scarborough Campus
- Former names: Scarborough College (1964–1996); University of Toronto at Scarborough (1996–2006)
- Type: Public
- Established: October 6, 1964 (62 years ago)
- Parent institution: University of Toronto
- Principal: Linda Johnston
- Dean: Mark Schmuckler (interim)
- Faculty: 260
- Students: 15,858 (2026)
- Undergraduates: 15,442
- Postgraduates: 416
- Location: Toronto, Ontario, Canada; 43°47′04″N 79°11′15″W
- Campus: Suburban, 123 hectares (300 acres)
- Magazine: The Underground
- Mascot: Rex the Raccoon
- Website: utsc.utoronto.ca

The University of Toronto Scarborough (U of T Scarborough or UTSC) is one of the three campuses of the University of Toronto, located in Toronto, Ontario, Canada. Opened in 1964, the campus is set upon 300 acres of suburban parkland in the neighbourhood of Highland Creek within the former city of Scarborough.

Initially established as Scarborough College, a constituent college of the University of Toronto's Faculty of Arts and Science, it expanded following its designation as an academic division of the university in 1972. Today, Scarborough is the smallest of the university's locations in terms of enrolment but the largest in terms of land area, the other two of which are the St. George and Mississauga campuses.

The Scarborough campus mainly hosts undergraduate studies in the disciplines of arts, sciences, and management whilst also hosting limited postgraduate research programs. The campus is noted for being a pioneer and major provider of cooperative education programs at the University of Toronto, as well as the Bachelor of Business Administration degree. Its mental health studies program was the first to be offered in Canada. It also offers enrolment in joint programs with the adjacent Centennial College Morningside Campus.

The original campus structure, the Andrews Building, was internationally acclaimed for its architectural design. The Toronto Pan Am Sports Centre, a public sports facility, and Dan Lang Field, home to the baseball team of the Toronto Varsity Blues, are also situated on the Scarborough campus. The campus has traditionally held the annual F. B. Watts Memorial Lectures, which has hosted internationally renowned scholars since 1970.

== Campus history ==
=== Scarborough College ===
The 152-hectare (380-acre) tract of land along the valley of Highland Creek was purchased in 1911 by Toronto-based businessman Miller Lash, who developed the site into his summer estate with a mansion, today known as the Miller Lash House. The mansion included 17 rooms, a barn, a coach house, and three houses for his staff to dwell. Over the following years, over 100 acres of the estate were also used as farmland. Following the death of Miller Lash in 1941, the estate was acquired by E. L. McLean, an insurance broker, in 1944 for $59,000. He made new additions to the estate, including a swimming pool and change room, and a retaining wall made in stone.

About 82 hectares (200 acres) of property was later purchased from McLean, just before his death, by the University of Toronto for about $650,000 in 1963, as part of the university's regional expansion. The groundskeeper of the land would continue to reside in the Highland Creek valley for the next 29 years. McLean's additions to the Miller Lash House, which would eventually become the residence of the campus's principal, were modernized, and 28 hectares (70 acres) of surrounding land north of the estate were also acquired. The University of Toronto established Scarborough College as part of its collegiate system and declared the campus a branch of the Faculty of Arts and Science. David Carlton Williams was appointed as the principal of Scarborough College and the planned Erindale College, as well as vice-president of the university. Scarborough and Erindale colleges were the first and only permanent regional expansions of the university, and the first colleges to establish their campuses at a distance from the original downtown location. The college's faculty, consisting of 16 members, was also established and headquartered at the St. George campus in downtown Toronto. First classes were held at Birchmount Park Collegiate Institute and Old Biology Building on the St. George campus. Designed by John Andrews, the first building of the campus began construction the following year. Due to delays in construction after a strike among workers, the Scarborough College opened in temporary classes at St. George to 191 full-time students in 1965. The first building was completed in time for the following academic year.

The college included a 6,000-square-foot (560 m^{2}) television production studio. This was for a unique video lecturing system the college initially planned to have, which relies on the use of closed-circuit television for teaching purposes. The system grabbed international media attention, and was complimented in the 1967 edition of Time. However, the video lecturing system was abandoned after it was condemned for the lack of communicability of students with instructors.

In 1972, the campus was reorganized from a constituent college to a fully-fledged academic division of the university, separate from the Faculty of Arts and Science.

In 1973, Scarborough College became the first post-secondary institution in Ontario to adopt a course credit system and provided the first cooperative education program in the province. The campus was re-branded as the University of Toronto at Scarborough in 1996, after it had been known unofficially as the University of Toronto Scarborough Campus since 1983. It officially adopted its present name in 2006.

== Location ==
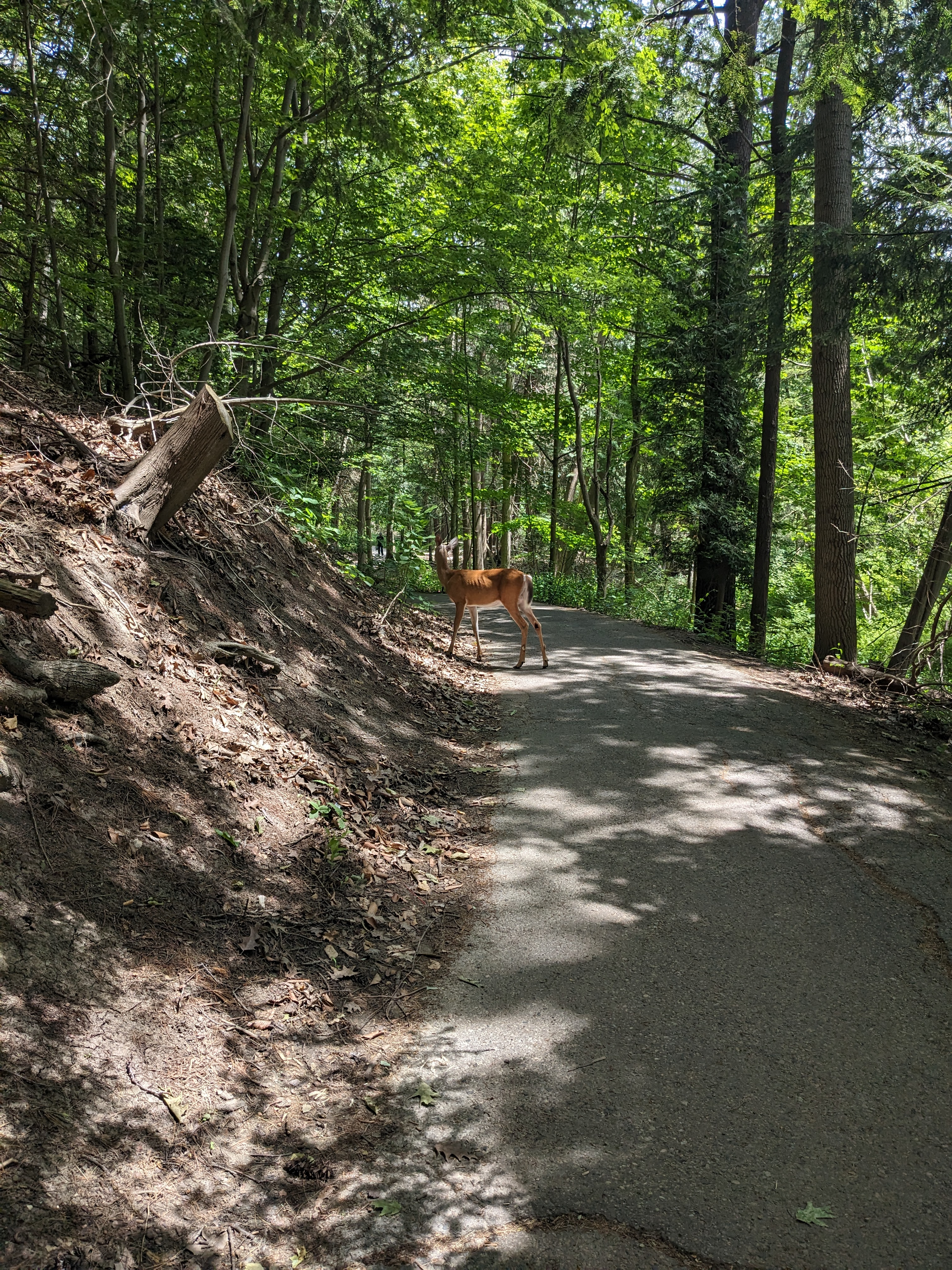
The Ma Moosh Ka Win Valley Trail facing south towards Highland Creek. Wildlife is commonly spotted along the trail.

For much of its existence, the University of Toronto Scarborough was described as a "mid-sized university campus". It sits on 123 hectares (300 acres) of land, forming the west side of the Highland Creek neighbourhood. It is bounded entirely by Morningside Avenue to the west, adjacent to the Morningside campus of Centennial College. The campus is bounded to the east by residential areas and Military Trail. The campus extends the north to south of Highway 401 and south to the north of Old Kingston Road. Unlike the university's downtown St. George campus, the Scarborough campus is located in a suburban area, consisting of residential houses along its eastern side and urban forestry on its southern and western side. It is approximately 22 km (14 mi) east of the university's St. George campus in downtown Toronto.

Ellesmere Road separates the south and north portions of the campuses. The neighbourhood's namesake river runs through the lower campus, and its valley consists of Ma Moosh Ka Win Valley Trail (formerly known as Valley Land Trail) and other pedestrian trails that link the campus to nearby parks and neighbourhoods. The underground passes and three major inter-campus pedestrian walks: Gallery Walk, Illiniaqtiup Aqqutinga (Scholars Walk), and Tsi Yonnenyakéhtó:Ten (Rock Walk) allow convenient travel between buildings in the south campus. Students often use the sidewalks at Military Trail to access the north campus buildings.

== Architecture ==
=== 1964–1999 ===
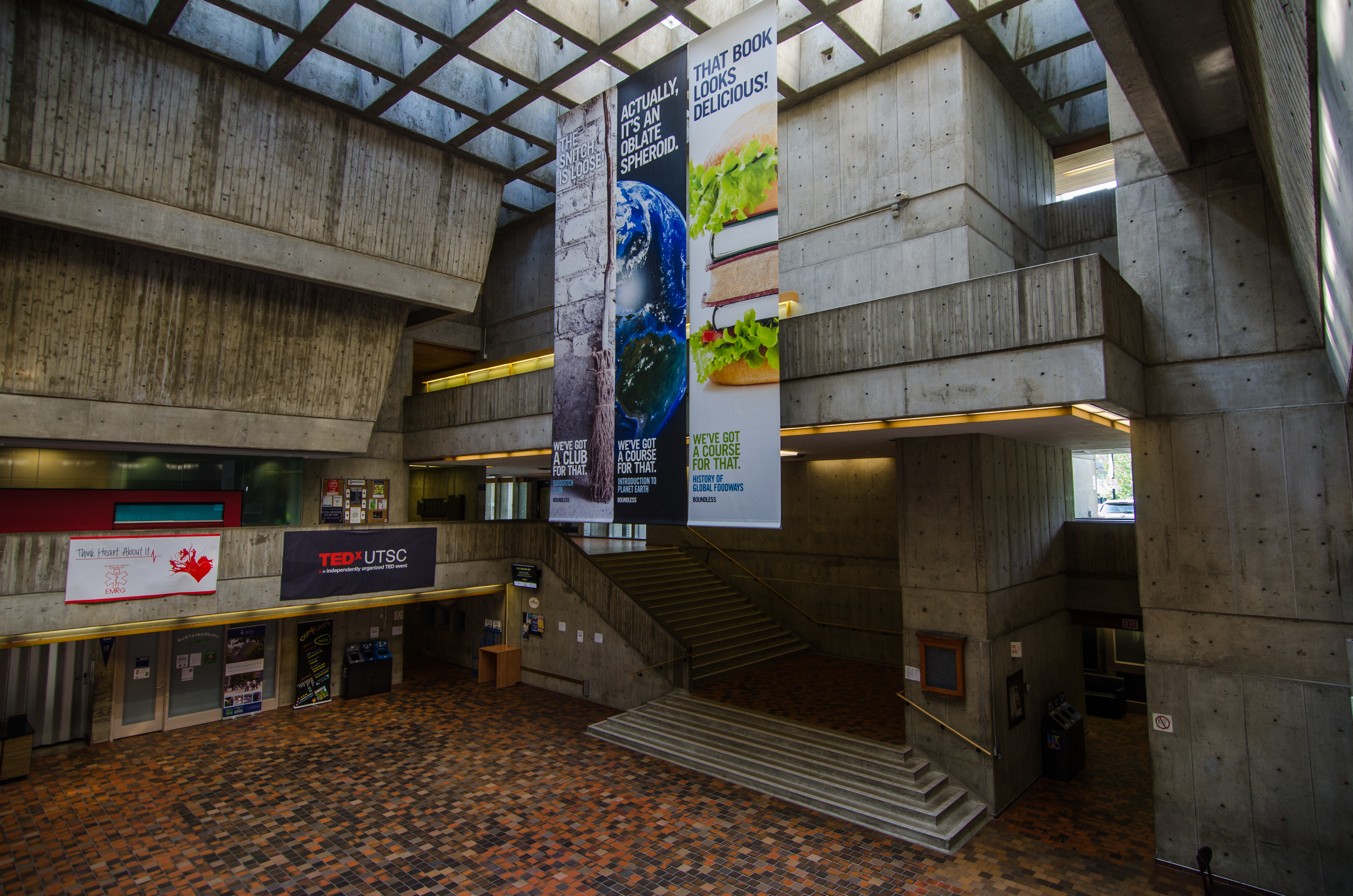
The Meeting Place, a campus common area within the Andrews Building.

The Andrews Building, the first completed building of the campus, named after its architect, John Andrews, was built in a brutalist architectural style and completed in 1964. Andrews objected to the term "brutalist," since the architecture was built with human needs and logic in mind, aiming to create a connected space that limited outdoor exposure in the winter. The interiors were made to mimic the streets of a city, with wide hallways and balconies on upper floors. The building is divided into two wings, known as the Science Wing and the Humanities Wing. The Meeting Place, a large atrium at the centre of both wings, is often used to hold events. The design of the Andrews Building, along with its unique closed-circuit television teaching system, was the target of international acclaim during the decade.

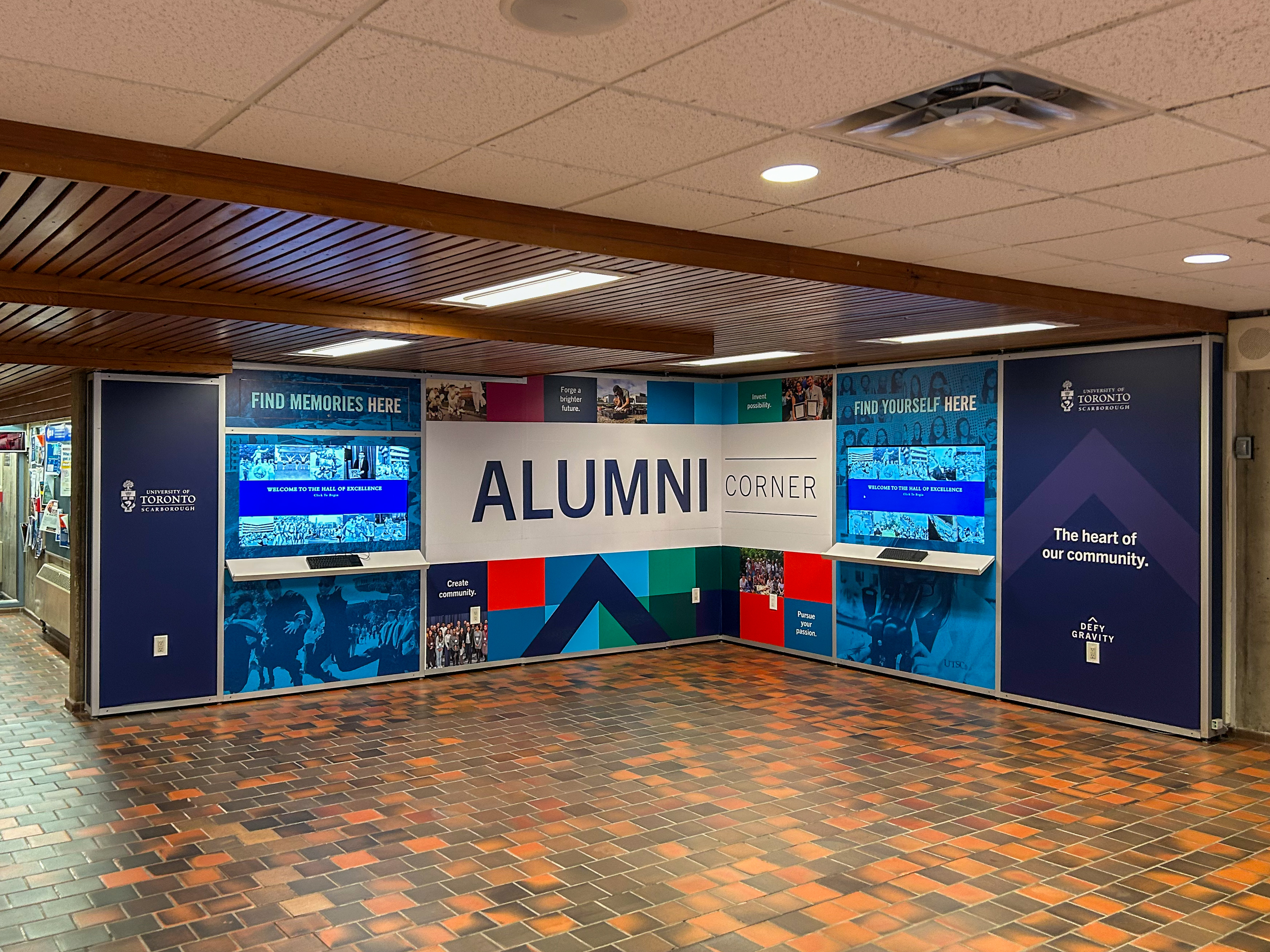
Alumni Corner (Hall of Excellence after renovation in 2025)

The 1970s and onward saw new buildings being designed in a modernist style. The Recreational Wing, now known as the Bladen Wing (named after Vincent Bladen, former dean of the Faculty of Arts and Science) was completed in 1972. The Recreation Wing (R-Wing) housed the University of Toronto Scarborough Library, then known as the Vincent W. Bladen Library. The N'Sheemaehn Child Care Centre, one of the university's non-profit child day care facilities, opened in 1990. An underground corridor completed in 1995, known as the Hall of Excellence, connects Bladen Wing and the Humanities Wing.

=== 2000–2008 ===
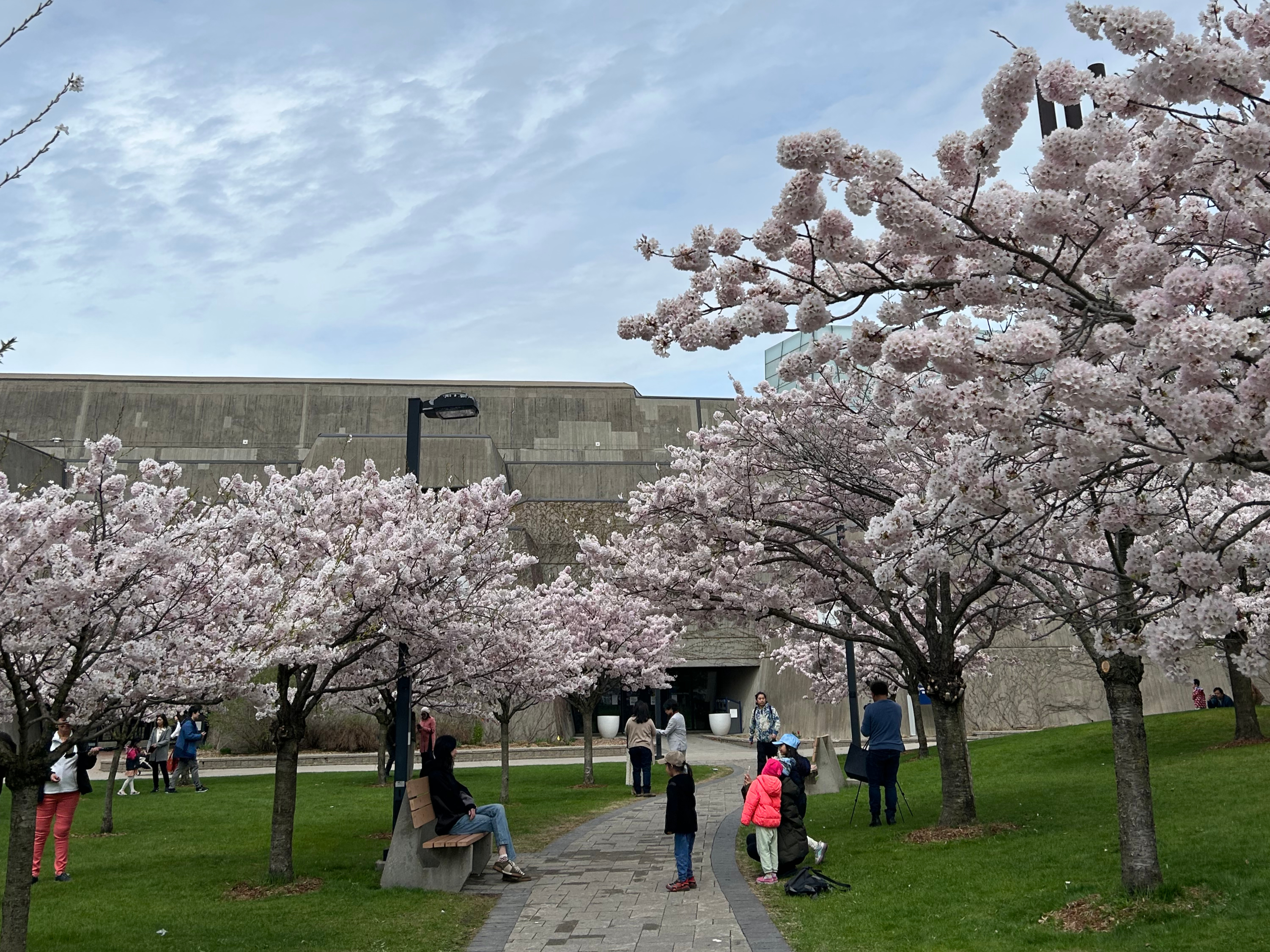
Sakura Grove during blooming season

Double cohort brought challenges to the teaching, study and residence spaces at the campus due to an increase in first-year enrolment. In response, the Academic Research Centre (ARC) and Joan Foley Hall were constructed. The ARC was built in 2003 as an extension of the Bladen Building with a copper finish. It allowed for the relocation and expansion of the University of Toronto Scarborough Library to its present state and introduced the campus's first near-500-seat lecture theatre, which has since held the Watts Lecture series, after formerly being held in the Meeting Place. The Doris McCarthy Gallery, also found in the ARC, exhibits works by local artists and campus alumni, Doris McCarthy. The Student Centre was opened in 2004 through a project that was initiated and funded by students through a levy from 2002 to 2027. Constructed using 18 tonnes of recycled steel from a demolished gallery at the Royal Ontario Museum, the three-storey Student Centre earned a Leadership in Energy and Environmental Design (LEED) certification as well as a Green Design Award from the City of Toronto. The Kina Wiiya Enadong Building (formerly known as the Management Wing, later renamed the Social Sciences Building due to the relocation of the Department of Management, and then changed to its current name in 2021 in response to the recommendations of the Truth and Reconciliation Commission of Canada report), which opened in 2004, was originally the home of the Department of Management. After the completion of the Instructional Centre in 2011, it became the new home of the Department of Management, the Department of Computer and Mathematical Sciences, and the offices of cooperative education programs. Brick and limestone were used to create the Arts and Administration Building, completed in 2005, which holds the principal's office. In 2005, the Consulate General of Japan donated 50 cherry trees to the campus to symbolize the friendship between Japan and Canada. The trees at Sakura Grove bloom annually, attracting students, faculty, and staff to enjoy the fleeting beauty of the blossoms. The Science Research Building, where post-graduate research facilities and a lecture hall are located, is an extension of the Science Wing that was completed in 2008.

=== 2009–present ===
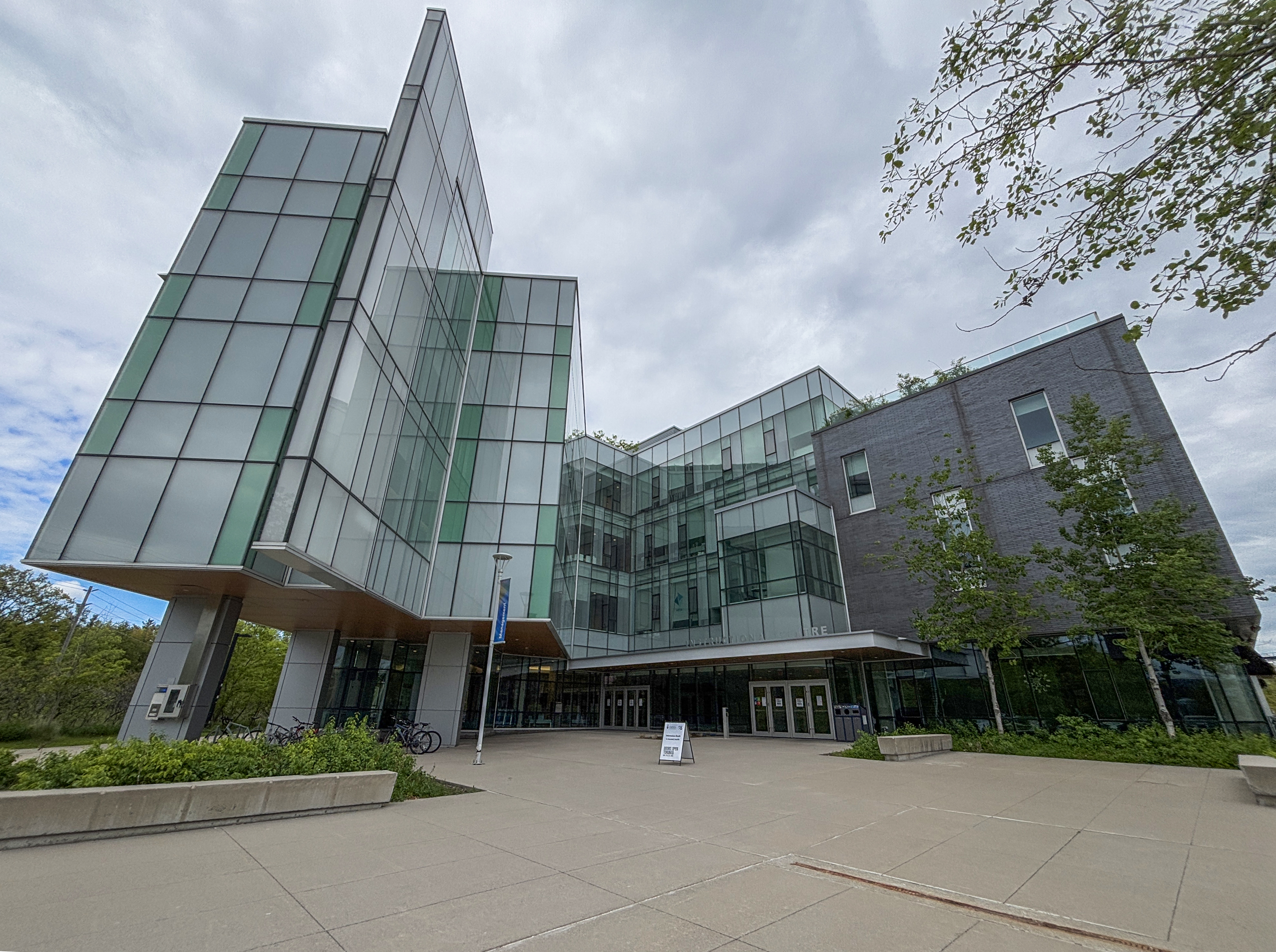
Instructional Centre

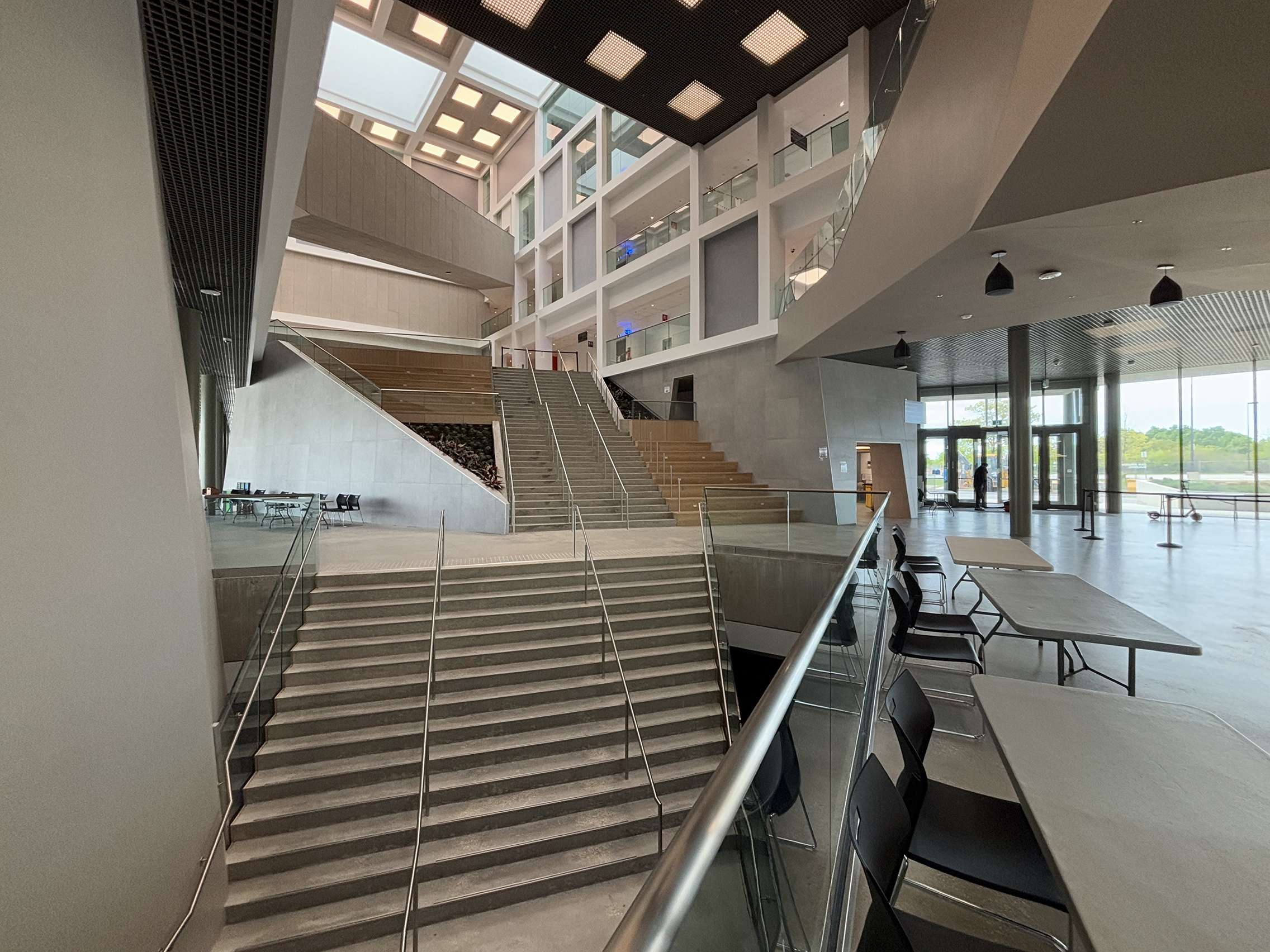
Interior of Sam Ibrahim Building

Since 2009, the university has undertaken a proposal to substantially expand the campus north of Ellesmere Road, starting with the construction of the Instructional Centre, funded by Canada's Economic Action Plan, completed in 2011. The Toronto Pan Am Sports Centre (built 2014) was one of the main venues of the 2015 Pan American Games and 2015 Parapan American Games. The Toronto Pan Am Sports Centre brought pool facility to campus and significantly expanded the size of the gym. The Parapan American Games also brought an addition of seven accessible tennis courts to the Highland Creek valley. The Environmental Science and Chemistry Building, completed in summer 2015, was the third building to open in the north grounds. Highland Hall, built on the footprint of the old gym and athletic centre, houses the registrar's office, admissions and recruitment, classrooms, a lecture hall, and an event centre. The Sam Ibrahim Building opened in 2024 as a "second instructional centre" on the north campus, built to house offices for the Department of Computer and Mathematical Sciences and several lecture halls. Harmony Commons is a student residence completed in 2023 and Indigenous House is due to be completed in 2025.

In 2022, the Ontario government announced that the University of Toronto's Scarborough campus would offer medical education. The Scarborough Academy of Medicine and Integrated Health (SAMIH) will be a hub on campus for the Temerty Faculty of Medicine and Bloomberg Faculty of Nursing, training approximately 40 physicians, 56 physician assistants, 30 nurse practitioners, 40 physiotherapists, and 300 undergraduate students in health sciences each year starting in September 2026 and 2027 at the Myron and Berna Garron Health Sciences Complex.

== Academics ==
The following academic divisions of the University of Toronto operate on the Scarborough campus (not including UTSC itself). Those marked with an asterisk (*) offer only graduate programs at the campus.

- John H. Daniels Faculty of Architecture, Landscape, and Design*
- Faculty of Arts and Science*
- Joseph L. Rotman School of Management*
- Temerty Faculty of Medicine (starting Fall 2027)
- Lawrence S. Bloomberg Faculty of Nursing*

=== Overview ===
The University of Toronto Scarborough is primarily an undergraduate campus with a significant number of direct-entry applicants from secondary schools. It has the largest proportion of its population studying at the undergraduate level among the university's three campuses. Students are diversified among concentrations that are specialists (9-16 credits), as well as the majors (6-9 credits) and minors (4-5 credits). The cooperative education programs, which require students to complete three semesters in workplaces pertaining to their field of study, are the most comprehensive among peer co-op programs at the University of Toronto. Joint programs with Centennial College, which award both a university degree and a college diploma, are offered in journalism, new media, paramedicine, and Music Industry and Technology.

Thirteen undergraduate departments award a Bachelor of Arts degree, most of which also offer a co-op option. The Department of Arts, Culture and Media offers joint programs with Centennial College, including journalism, music industry and technology, and new media studies. The department is one of only two universities in Ontario to offer an undergraduate degree in arts management.

U of T Scarborough has seven departments in the sciences, which award a Bachelor of Science degree. Most of which also offer a co-op option. The Department of Health and Society offers programs in Population Health and Paramedicine (joint with Centennial) in addition to the Bachelor of Arts. The Department of Physical and Environmental Sciences offers a combined degree program that combines a Bachelor of Science in environmental science and a Master of Engineering. Some programs in the Department of Physical and Environmental Sciences and the Department of Biological Sciences can also lead to a combined degree with a Master of Environmental Science. The Department of Psychology offers a joint degree program combining a Bachelor of Science in Mental Health Studies and a Master of Social Work. In addition, some Bachelor of Science and Bachelor of Arts programs also offer a combined degree with a Master of Education.

The Bachelor of Business Administration with co-op option is also unique to the Scarborough campus among University of Toronto divisions, offered through programs in the Department of Management. Scarborough is the only campus that provides double degree programs, including one that combines management and finance with statistics (quantitative finance stream), where students receive both a Bachelor of Business Administration and an Honours Bachelor of Science degree, and usually takes five years to complete. This degree, introduced in 2018, is the first of its kind at any university in the Greater Toronto Area and only 20 students are admitted each year.

=== List of academic departments and units ===
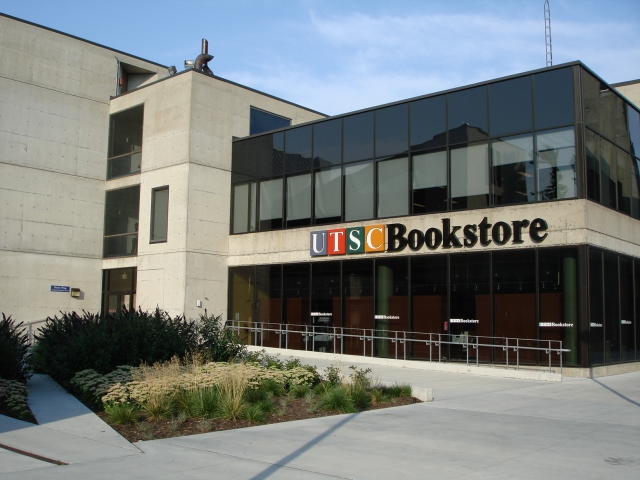
The University of Toronto Bookstore operates a branch at Scarborough. Due to disrepair and the bookstore's future relocation to the north campus, the sign on the wall was removed in 2025.

U of T Scarborough has 16 academic departments:

- Department of Anthropology
- Department of Arts, Culture and Media
- Department of Biological Sciences
- Department of Computer and Mathematical Sciences
- Department of English
- Department of Global Development Studies
- Department of Health and Society
- Department of Historical and Cultural Studies
- Department of Human Geography
- Department of Language Studies
- Department of Management
- Department of Philosophy
- Department of Physical and Environmental Sciences
- Department of Political Science
- Department of Psychology
- Department of Sociology

=== Co-operative education ===
U of T Scarborough is distinguished by its extensive offering of co-operative education (co-op) programs across the arts, sciences, and management disciplines. Often referred to as "U of T's co-op campus," the program has been a core component of the Scarborough campus's academic model for over 50 years.

The campus established the first cooperative education program in Ontario in 1973, following its reorganization into a separate division from the Faculty of Arts and Science. The International Development Studies (IDS) Co-op, established in 1984, was the first undergraduate co-op of its kind in Canada, focused on international development field work.

The University of Toronto Scarborough Co-op Office currently facilitates programs in approximately 50 different subject areas, with an annual enrolment of nearly 4,000 students.

==== Program structure ====
Co-op degree requirements combine academic study with mandatory work terms, which are integral and mandatory components of the program curriculum.

- Students are typically required to complete a minimum of 12 months of work experience, most commonly fulfilled through three, four-month work terms, or a combination including one 8 or 12-month term.
- All co-op work terms are full-time and salaried, with the requirement to be paid at least minimum wage.
- Placements for University of Toronto Scarborough students occur across local, national, and international industries, including major employers in finance, government, technology, and non-profit sectors, such as Microsoft, CIBC, RBC, and The Hospital for Sick Children.

=== Graduate programs ===
Four graduate programs are based on the campus. The Department of Physical & Environmental Sciences offers masters and doctoral degrees in environmental science. The Department of Psychology offers a combined MA and PhD program in clinical psychology. The most recent graduate program offered through the Department of Management is the Masters of Accounting and Finance, which provides accreditation pathways for both the CPA and CFA designations.

== Research ==
Research at the University of Toronto Scarborough encompasses disciplines within the life sciences, natural sciences, and health sectors, alongside initiatives centered on community engagement and environmental sustainability.

=== Research labs and centres ===
- Black Health Equity Lab (BHEL) – Established in 2022 in the Department of Health & Society, BHEL focuses on improving health equity for Black communities in Scarborough. Its projects include HIV prevention and treatment programs developed in partnership with local health organizations.
- Clusters of Scholarly Prominence Program (CPSS) – Funds interdisciplinary faculty teams conducting collaborative projects.
- Sam Ibrahim Centre for Inclusive Excellence in Entrepreneurship, Innovation & Leadership (SICIEEIL) – Housed in the Sam Ibrahim Building, this centre supports student entrepreneurship and leadership training, funded through a donation by entrepreneur Sam Ibrahim.
- SoundLife Scarborough (SLS) – Launched in 2023, this initiative fosters community-engaged research through music, creating collaborations between the university, local musicians, and cultural organizations.
- Therapeutic Interventions for Psychosis Lab (TIP Lab) – This lab investigates the causes and treatment of distressing symptoms of psychosis, developing interventions such as cognitive behavioural therapy and cognitive remediation.

=== Sustainability in infrastructure ===
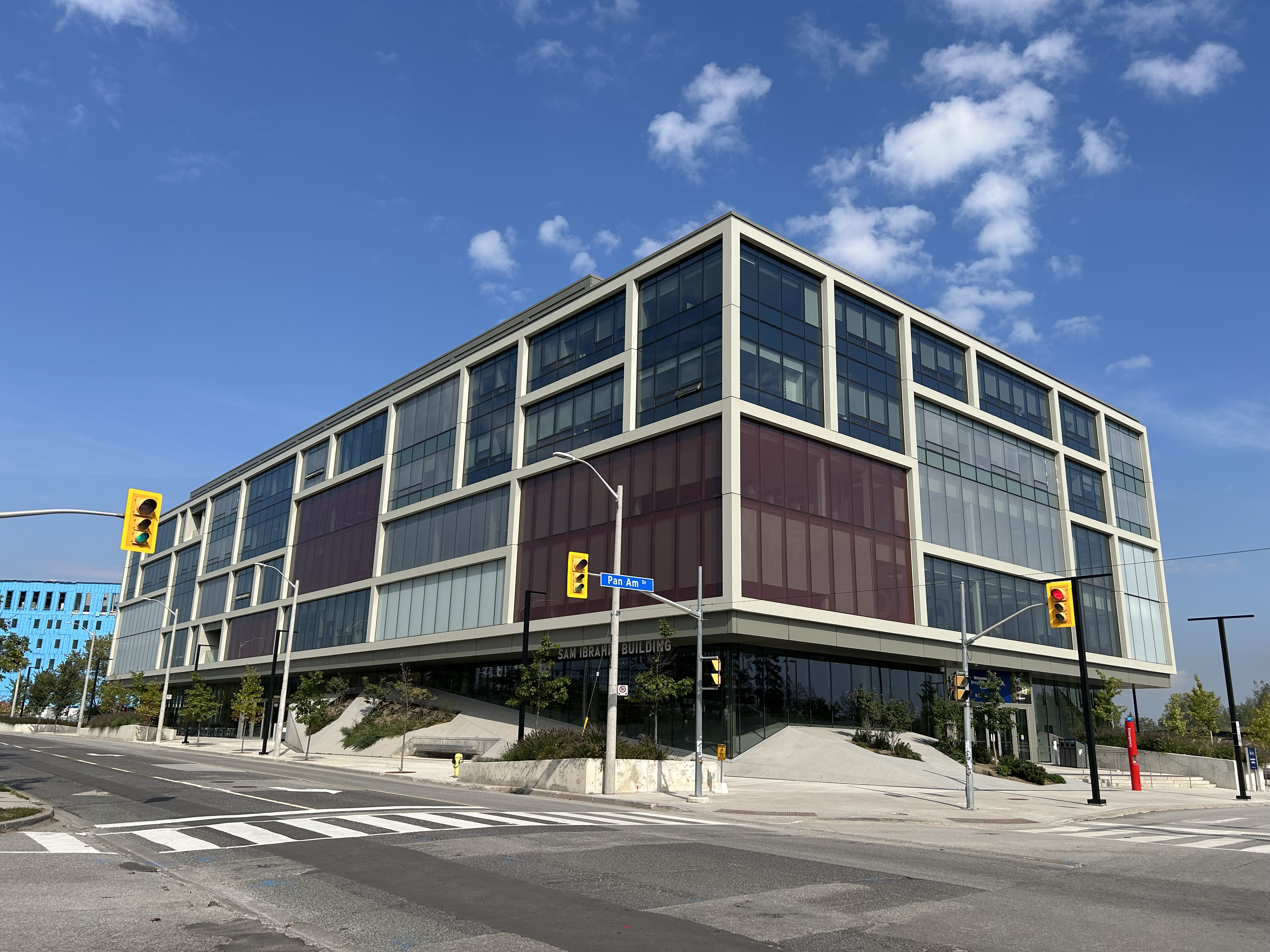
Exterior of the Sam Ibrahim Building

The Scarborough campus integrates sustainability into research and campus planning. Recent projects include:

- Harmony Commons was built to Passive House standards, projected to reduce energy use by 40–60% compared to conventional designs.
- The Sam Ibrahim Building, which features geothermal heating, high-efficiency insulation, and a green roof, designed to lower energy consumption by ~40%.

=== Interdisciplinary research centres and clusters ===
The Scarborough campus hosts a variety of interdisciplinary research centres and extra-departmental research clusters that facilitate collaboration across disciplines and support innovative projects.

- Centre for Biological Chemistry – Focuses on research in molecular biology, biochemistry, and cellular processes, supporting both basic and applied research initiatives.
- Centre for Ethnography – Established in 2007, this centre promotes ethnographic research and writing on campus, hosting an annual speaker series, workshops, courses, and a fellowship competition for ethnographic writing.
- Centre for Global Disability Studies (CGDS) – Founded in 2020, CGDS brings together researchers across U of T campuses to conduct interdisciplinary disability studies research, emphasizing anti-ableist, intersectional, and transnational approaches.
- Centre for the Neurobiology of Stress – Established in 2000, this state-of-the-art facility supports research on brain and nervous system functioning, including electrophysiology, microscopy, and behavioral studies.
- Centre for Planetary Sciences – Hosted by the Department of Physical and Environmental Sciences, it provides a platform for cross-disciplinary research on planetary science, supports postdoctoral fellows, and engages in public outreach.
- Culinaria Research Centre – A multidisciplinary initiative exploring food studies, including cultural identity, diaspora, production, and social impacts of food. Combines fieldwork, archival research, GIS, and digital humanities approaches.
- Environmental Nuclear Magnetic Resonance (NMR) Centre – Opened in 2004, this facility conducts environmental research using NMR spectroscopy to study molecular-level environmental processes and metabolomics.
- Integrative Behaviour and Neuroscience (IBN) Group – Founded in 2001, focuses on functional and evolutionary aspects of animal behaviour, bridging genomic data and phenotype using integrative experimental approaches.
- Plant Cellular and Molecular Processes (PCMP) Group – Operates in an open-concept laboratory with advanced plant growth chambers. Research spans biochemistry, molecular genetics, physiology, and microscopy to investigate plant growth, development, and stress responses.

== Student life ==
=== Student Centre ===
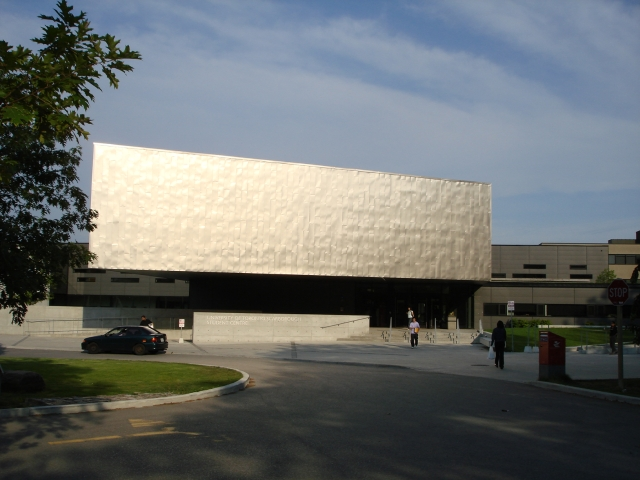
The Student Centre is a landmark for student activities at the campus.

The Student Centre is a three-story 48,000-square-foot (4,500 m^{2}) building, where the office of the Scarborough Campus Students' Union (SCSU), office of Student Affairs of the University of Toronto Scarborough, as well as other offices of student clubs and organizations, are located. It also contains a food court, health and wellness centre, and multifaith prayer room. Located on the first floor of the Student Center, 1265 Bistro is a bar and restaurant operated by the Student Union. Originally called "The Bluffs," the venue opened shortly after the opening of the Student Centre and reopened in 2009 as "Rex's Den" with improved service. After a brief closure during the COVID-19 pandemic, the Student Union decided to permanently close Rex's Den and rebrand it as the existing 1265 Bistro in 2022 based on student feedback.

=== Transportation ===
Several public transit connections can be made at the campus bus terminal, which serves routes operated by the Toronto Transit Commission, GO Transit, and Durham Region Transit.

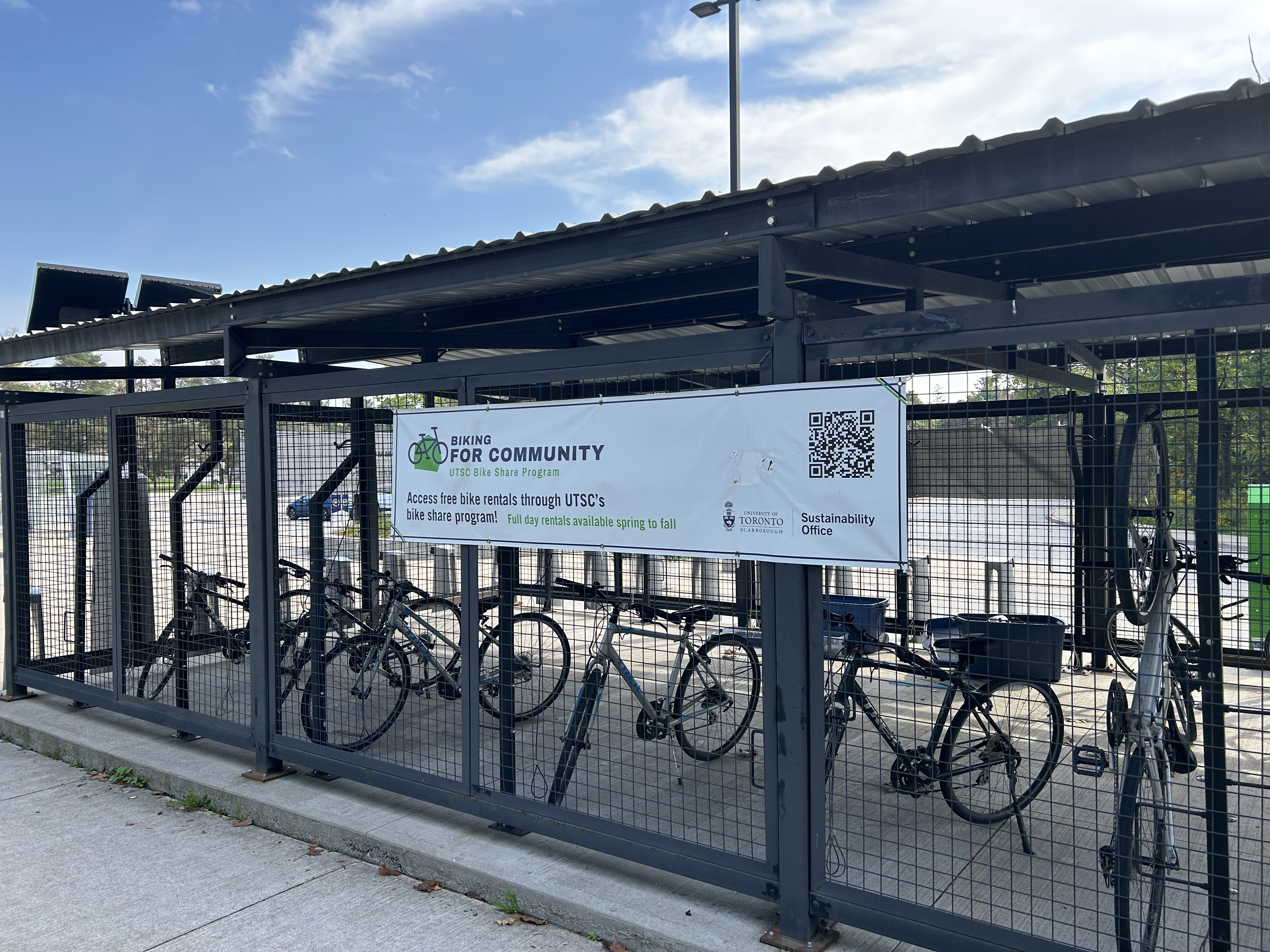
UTSC Bike Share Program cage

The UTSC Bike Share Program offers Scarborough campus students a free bicycle rental service on weekdays from 9 to 4:30 pm for same-day rent and return. It supports short‑distance trips near campus. Students can rent bikes through the Student Residence Centre by completing an online form using their UTORid and student number. Upon approval, renters receive a bike lock, a lanyard with the bike number, a key, and a swipe access card for the outdoor bike cage. Bikes are collected from the outdoor cage beside the Highland Hall bus loop, behind the Bike Share Toronto docks. The program also promotes sustainable transportation.

=== Dining ===
The University of Toronto Scarborough provides a variety of dining options across campus, ranging from subsidized student-run venues to university-managed dining halls.

The Student Centre contains a food court that serves as a central hub for student dining. The food court offers a selection of vendors, including popular chains lke KFC and Subway. It is frequently used by commuting students due to its central location and extended weekday hours. Located on the first floor of the Student Centre, 1265 Bistro is a student-run bar and restaurant operated by the Scarborough Campus Students' Union (SCSU). The venue offers relatively affordable food due to subsidies from the union. The space has gone through multiple rebrandings since the Student Centre opened. A Chatime is also located adjacent to 1265 Bistro.

The Harmony Commons Dining Hall is the primary all-you-care-to-eat facility on the campus, serving breakfast, lunch, and dinner daily. First-year residents are required to purchase a seven-day meal plan, which is valid only at Harmony Commons. The dining hall also emphasizes sustainable dining practices and provides vegetarian, vegan, gluten free, and halal options.

The Market Place in the Humanities Wing offers a variety of international cuisines and grab-and-go options.

Two Tim Hortons locations can be found on campus. One is located between the Academic Resource Centre and Bladen Wing. The other one is at the Toronto Pan Am Sports Centre (TPASC). There is also a Starbucks at the Meeting Place, a La Prep at the Instructional Centre, Café Dépôt at the Sam Ibrahim Building, Hotpot and Tea at Highland Hall, and more.

=== Library ===
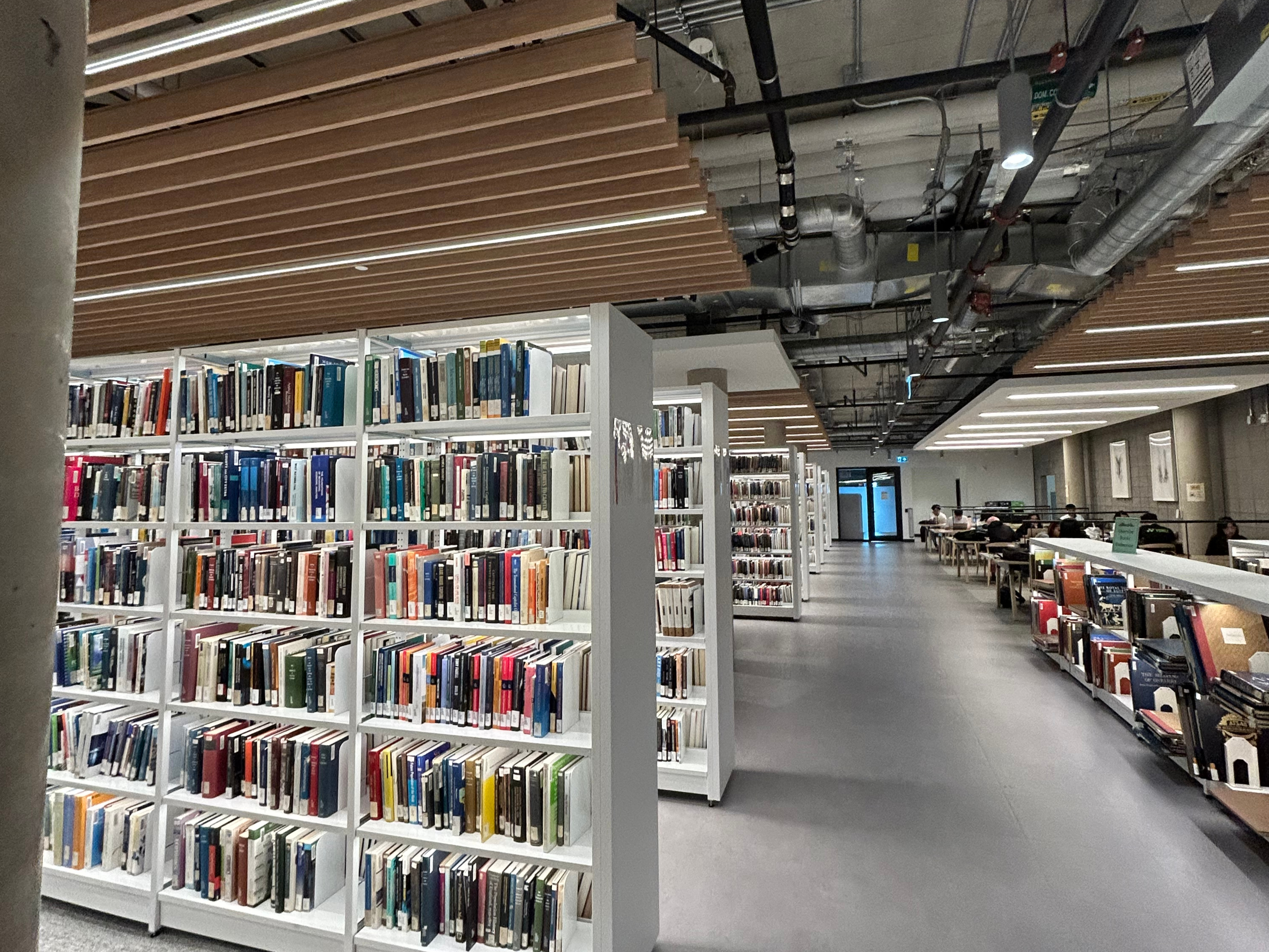
Interior of the renovated campus library

A branch of the University of Toronto Libraries, the University of Toronto Scarborough Library serves as an academic hub for students, faculty, and researchers, providing access to a wide range of scholarly resources, study spaces, and digital services. In addition to traditional library services, the library supports experiential learning, digital literacy, and research skills development through workshops, peer tutoring, and partnerships with faculty.

The BRIDGE is a joint initiative of UTSC's Department of Management and the UTSC Library, blending academic, research, and experiential learning in the domains of business, data, and entrepreneurship. As a multipurpose academic space, the BRIDGE functions as a business research library, data lab, collaboration lounge, and student innovation hub. It equips students with access to advanced tools and platforms, fostering hands-on learning in business analytics and research. The BRIDGE also serves as a hub for co-curricular programming, workshops, events, and partnerships with industry, aiming to connect classroom knowledge with practical applications, and to support student formation, community engagement, and innovation.

=== Athletics ===
The University of Toronto Scarborough provides opportunities for students of all skill levels to participate in sports and fitness, whether for recreation, competition, or general well-being. Scarborough campus students have access to the Toronto Pan Am Sports Centre (TPASC) on campus, as well as athletic facilities across all three University of Toronto campuses.

==== Toronto Pan Am Sports Centre ====
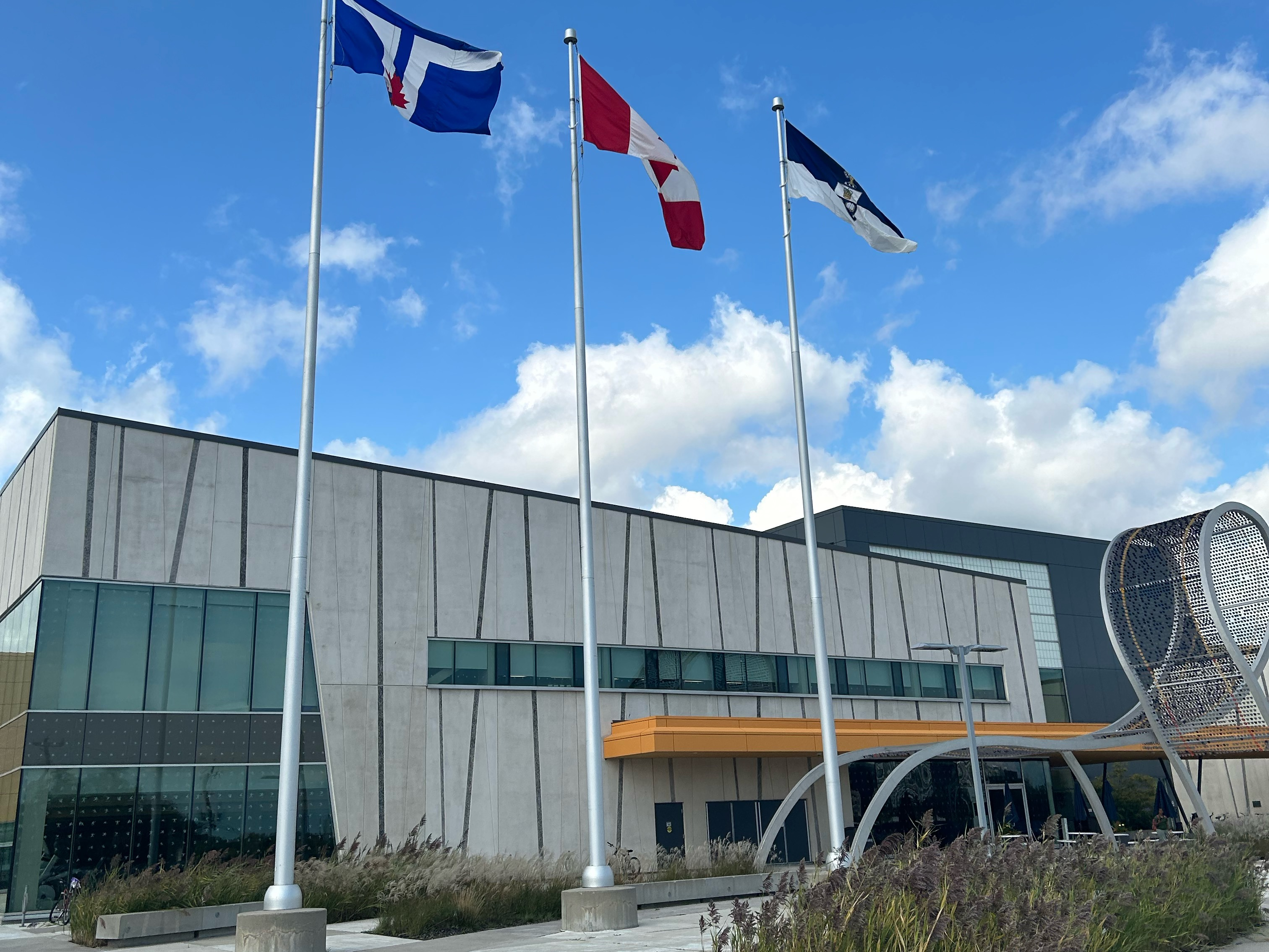
TPASC's entrance

The Toronto Pan Am Sports Centre (TPASC) is a major athletic facility located on the Scarborough campus. It was constructed for the 2015 Pan American Games and Parapan American Games. It is co-owned by the University of Toronto and the City of Toronto. It also serves as the home arena for the Scarborough Shooting Stars of the Canadian Elite Basketball League (CEBL). In 2024, more than 11,000 students made use of TPASC.

Opened in 2014, the facility includes:

- Two Olympic-sized (10-lane, 50-metre) swimming pools and a 25-metre diving pool.
- A field house with multiple courts for basketball, volleyball, and other indoor sports.
- A fitness centre, running track, and climbing wall.

The centre is used extensively by university students, varsity teams, and community members. Students enrolled at the Scarborough campus receive membership access as part of their incidental fees, granting use of the gym, pool, and other fitness amenities.

In addition to student use, TPASC regularly hosts local and international competitions, as well as national team training camps.

==== Varsity sports ====
The University of Toronto's Varsity Blues gathers elite athletes from across all three campuses to compete against other universities.

==== Intramurals ====
Intramural programs provide opportunities for organized competition among all three campuses. Each year, about 827 intramural athletes participate. Sports include:

- Badminton (Co-ed)
- Basketball
- Cricket
- Field hockey (Women's)
- Flag football
- Ice hockey
- Indoor soccer
- Lacrosse (Women's)
- Outdoor soccer
- Tennis
- Ultimate Frisbee (Co-ed)
- Volleyball

Unless otherwise noted, all programs offer options for men and women.

=== Residences ===
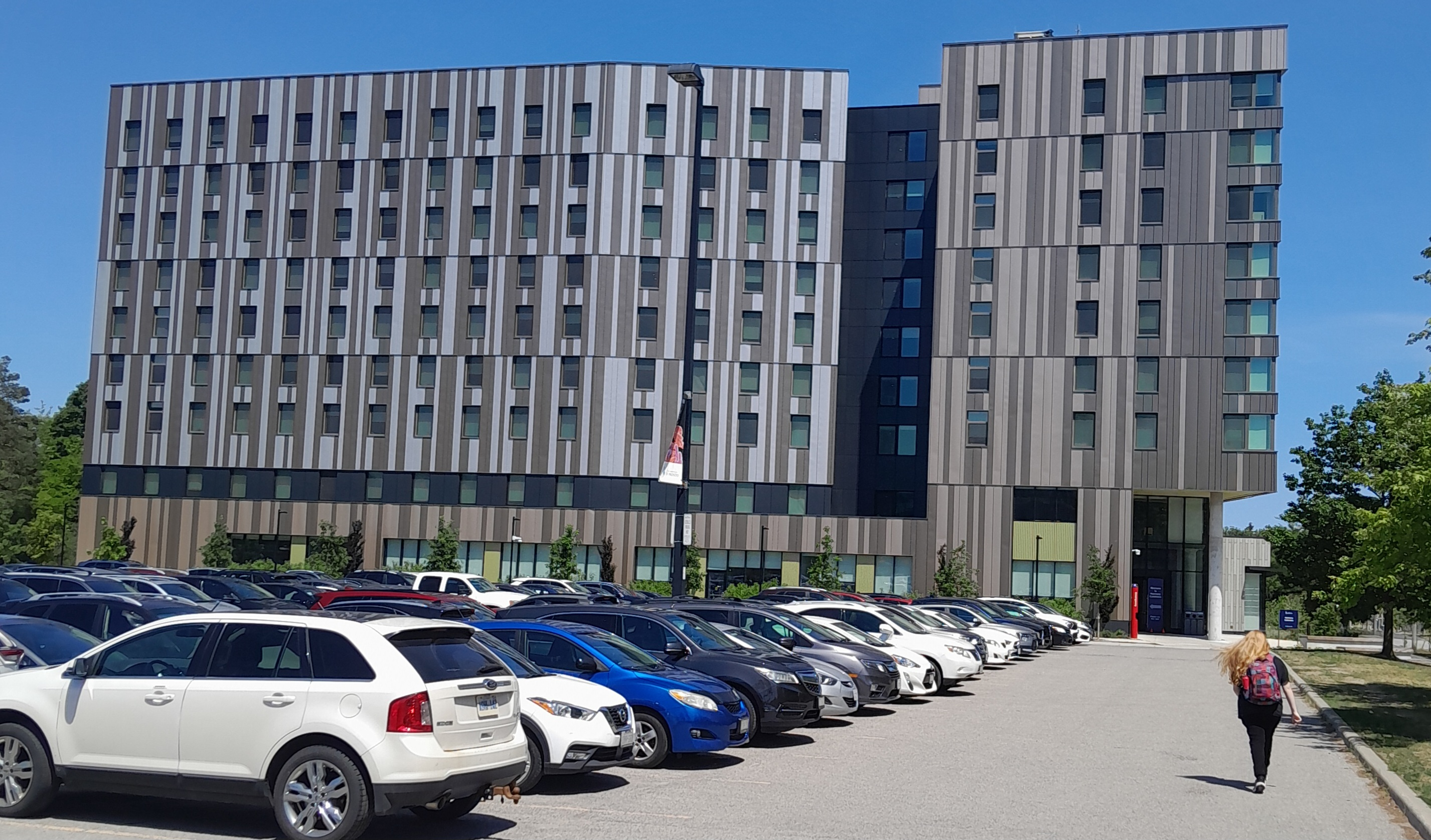
Harmony Commons residence building

Scarborough College was not originally planned to include any residence halls. Prior to 2023, student housing was primarily located at the southernmost end of campus. In 1967, students proposed additional on-campus housing. This led to the construction of the South Townhouses (Phase 1): Aspen Hall, Birch Hall, Cedar Hall, Dogwood Hall, and Elm Hall, which opened in 1973 and housed approximately 250 students. The townhouses feature shared common areas, kitchens, and bathrooms for student use. With growing demand and increased enrollment, the South Townhouses (Phase 2): Fir Hall, Grey Pine Hall, Hickory Hall, and Ironwood Hall were completed in 1984 to house 144 students. By 1989, the North Townhouses (Phase 3): Juniper Hall, Koa Hall, Larch Hall, and Maple Hall were built adjacent to the Science Research Building, adding 142 beds.

To meet the needs of the growing student body, Joan Foley Hall, named after the campus's first female president, opened in 2003. Joan Foley Hall offers 58 suites, accommodating up to 229 students. Each unit has a shared common area, kitchen, and bathroom. The building is also equipped with an elevator. The Student Residence Centre, a blue building adjacent to Joan Foley Hall, oversees residence administration and serves as a common area for all townhouse and Joan Foley Hall residents. It handles student mail, accepts food delivery, and provides some daily necessities for student use.

In 2023, the university opened the nine-storey Harmony Commons. This passive house residence provides 748 additional beds and features a sustainable design, integrated dining, and flexible study and recreational spaces. Currently, Harmony Commons and South Townhouses are for first-year students. Upper-year undergraduates and graduate students can only apply to live in Joan Foley Hall or North Townhouses. If there are vacancies, first-year students may be assigned to North Townhouses, too.

All housing has both shared and single bedrooms available, with a limited number of "super single" bedrooms in Harmony Commons featuring private bathrooms. With limited exceptions, the duration of accommodation is based on the length of the semester(s). Student housing has a 'first-year guarantee' where first-years who apply before a certain deadline are guaranteed to find housing. Since not all first-year residences do not have kitchens where cooking is possible, first-year residents, regardless of their residence, must purchase a seven-day meal plan that is valid only in the Harmony Commons dining hall.

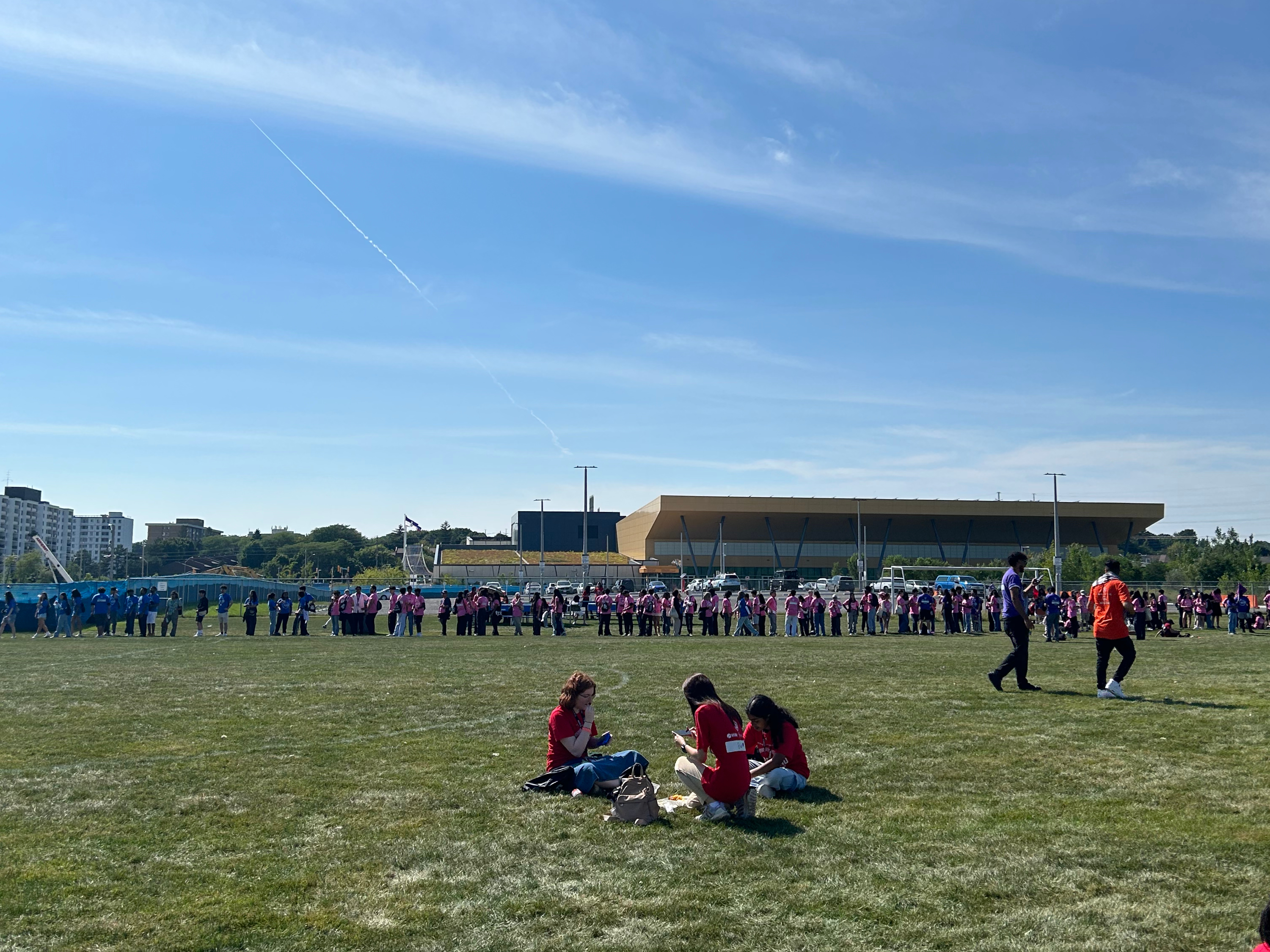
Frosh 2024 outside TPASC

=== Students' unions ===
==== Scarborough Campus Students' Union ====
The Scarborough Campus Students' Union (SCSU) is the official undergraduate student union at the University of Toronto Scarborough, representing and advocating for the interests of the student body.

Established in 1966 the SCSU has led numerous student-driven initiatives, such as the construction of Scarborough campus residences and the student centre and pro-Palestinian demonstrations in the face of the Gaza War. The SCSU operates and manages the campus Student Centre, owns and runs the 1265 Bistro restaurant, supports and recognizes departmental student associations (DSAs) and clubs, and offers various services including bursaries, health & dental plans, lockers, photocopying, and graduation photos. The union also provides discounts, organizes events, and supports student initiatives across campus.

==== Graduate Students' Union ====
The University of Toronto Graduate Students' Union (UTGSU or simply GSU) represents over 18,500 graduate students across all three campuses, offering services such as health and dental insurance, intramural leagues, funding opportunities, and advocacy.

==== Graduate Students Association at Scarborough ====
At the Scarborough campus, the Graduate Students Association at Scarborough (GSAS) is an elected body representing graduate students. GSAS manages the Graduate and Postdoc Lounge, organizes social and academic events, and publishes The Valley, a journal featuring creative works, research highlights, and stories from graduate students and postdocs. It also collaborates with the Vice-Principal Research and Vice-Dean Graduate on initiatives such as the Graduate Student Seminar Series, the New Frontiers Seminar Series, and the Graduate Student Summer Gym Rebate. In partnership with the Centre for Teaching & Learning (CTL), the Academic Advising & Career Centre (AA&CC), and the Graduate Association for Professional Skills (GAPS), GSAS also delivers workshops and professional training.

=== Campus groups and student organizations ===
Supported by the SCSU, each academic department at the University of Toronto Scarborough has its own departmental student association (DSA), which provides academic support, advocacy, and social programming for students. Examples include the Biological Sciences Student Association (BioSA) and Psychology and Neuroscience Departmental Association (PNDA).

SCSU recognizes and supports a wide range of student clubs, covering cultural, academic, and recreational interests. Examples include the Emergency Medical Response Group (EMRG) and Twelve65. Students can browse existing clubs or register a new club through the SCSU Club Services portal.

==== Frosh (SCSU Orientation) ====
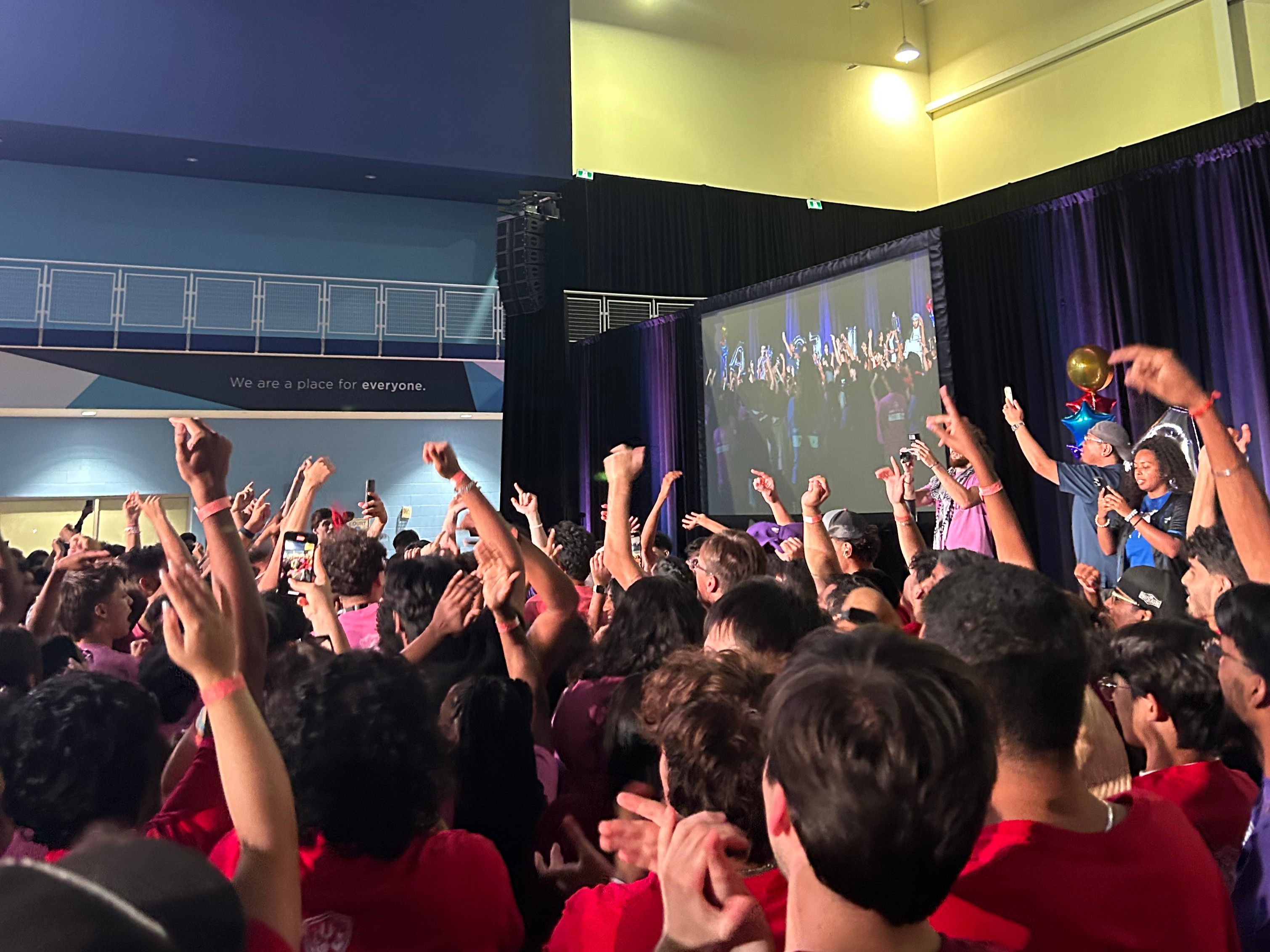
Frosh 2024 inside TPASC

At the University of Toronto Scarborough, Frosh is the annual ticketed orientation event for incoming students, organized by the Scarborough Campus Students' Union (SCSU). The event typically spans three days and includes a mix of social and campus-familiarization activities.

During Frosh, students are grouped into "houses" and compete in challenges and games to earn points toward a "House Cup." The program also includes opening ceremonies, performances, campus tours, and opportunities to meet upper-year students.

==== ArtSideOut ====
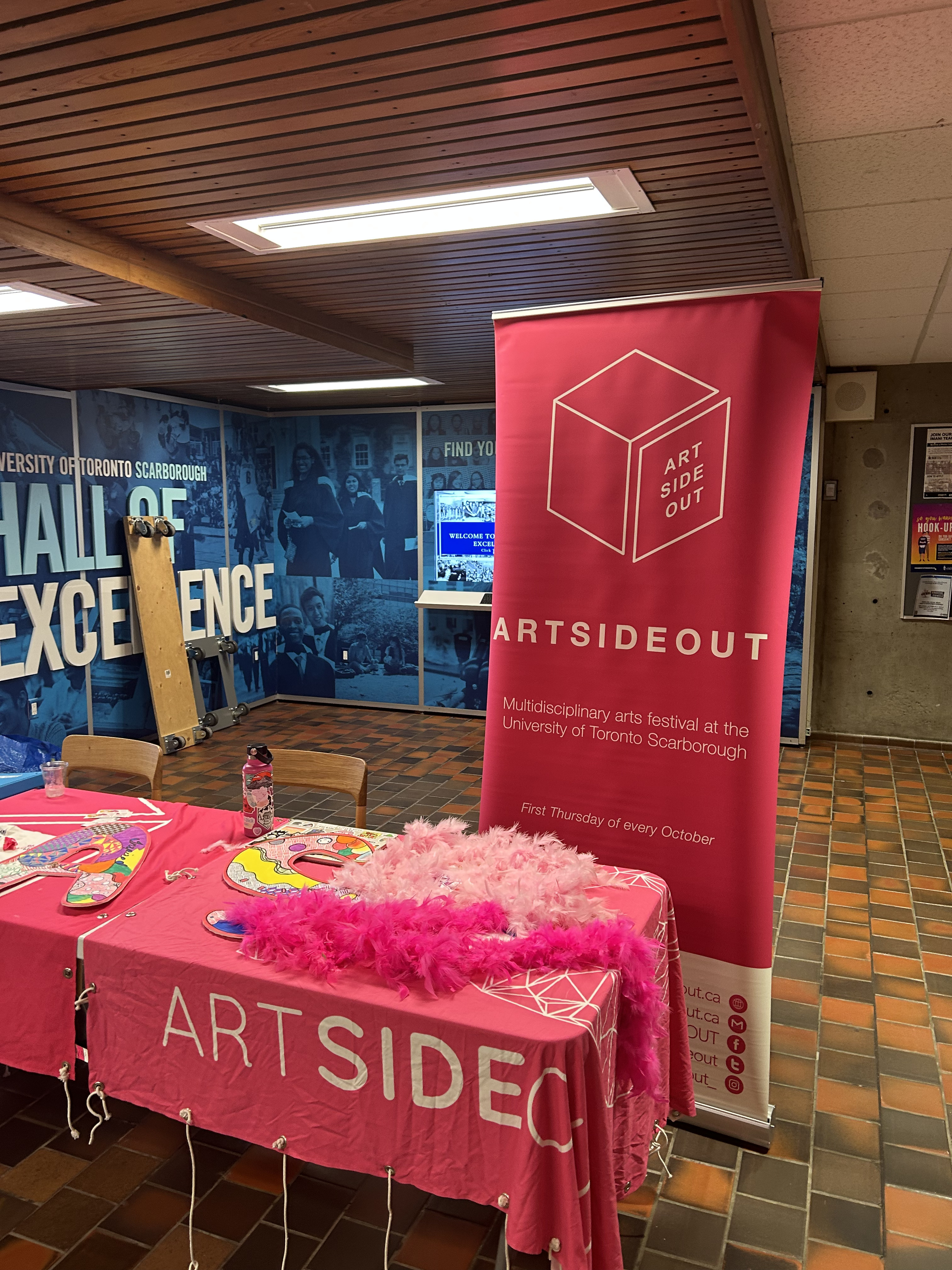
ArtSideOut 2024 booth

ArtSideOut (ASO; stylized in all caps) is the campus's largest multidisciplinary arts festival, held annually in October. The event transforms the campus into an open-air gallery, featuring visual art exhibitions, live performances, interactive installations, and workshops. Organized by students for students, it provides a platform for the university community to engage with and showcase diverse artistic expressions. The festival is free and open to all, fostering creativity and cultural exchange within the campus.

==== Media ====
Student media on the campus include The Underground, the campus's official student magazine and news outlet. The campus also receives distributions of The Varsity, the tri-campus newspaper of the University of Toronto.

==== Greek life ====
Greek life at the University of Toronto Scarborough includes one sorority: Delta Alpha Theta - Gamma chapter and one fraternity: Xi Alpha Pi. None of these organizations has a house. As per the anti-discrimination policy since 1960, the University of Toronto does not officially recognize fraternities or sororities.

=== Demographics ===
The University of Toronto's Scarborough campus has about 22 per cent as many students as its St. George campus. It comprises 15 per cent of the university's student enrolment as a whole. The Scarborough campus has the largest proportion of international students of the university's three locations with 30.7 per cent, as opposed to 29.0 per cent at the St. George campus and 25.7 per cent at the Mississauga campus. The Scarborough gender ratio is less balanced than St. George, with a higher proportion of women enrolled at both the undergraduate and graduate level.

Student Demographics (UTSC, 2024–25)
	Undergraduate	Graduate
Men	41.3%	34.6%
Women	56.1%	63.7%
Other gender or unreported	2.6%	1.7%
Canadian student	69.0%	80.7%
International student	31.0%	19.3%

== Notable people ==
=== Faculty ===
- Emily Agard, former biology instructor
- Aisha Ahmad, associate professor in the department of political science
- Maydianne Andrade, ecologist and former professor
- R. Michael Bagby, professor of psychology
- Brenda Beck, adjunct professor in Anthropology department in the field of South Asian folklore
- Janice Boddy, Professor of Anthropology
- Tom Bolton, astronomer and former professor
- Deanna Bowen, former instructor in the Department of Arts, Culture & Media
- Mark V. Campbell, Associate Chair of the Department of Arts, Culture and Media
- Leslie Chan, professor
- Elizabeth Cowper, former chair of the department of humanities
- Irena Creed, vice-principal for research and innovation
- William J. Crins, lecturer
- Elizabeth Dhuey, Associate Professor of Economics
- Jeffrey Dvorkin, former lecturer and Director of the Journalism Program
- Modris Eksteins, historian, author, and former professor
- Nick Eyles, professor of geology
- Donna Gabaccia, history professor
- Steve Joordens, professor of psychology
- Madhavi Kale, associate professor of history
- Bruce Kidd, former campus principal and member of the Canadian 1964 Summer Olympics team
- Michael Lambek, professor of anthropology
- Tanya Mars, professor of performance art and video in the Department of Arts, Culture and Media
- Kathy Martin, former assistant professor
- Daniel David Moses, former teacher, and writer-in-residence
- Tony Nardi, actor, playwright, theatre director, and instructor
- Laura-Ann Petitto, a multiple award-winning cognitive neuroscientist and psychologist who has performed influential research in various branches of neuroscience using humans and chimpanzees.
- Thy Phu, professor of media studies
- Bhavani Raman, historian, associate professor and associate chair
- Mahua Sarkar, professor of sociology
- William Seager, professor of philosophy
- Zindel Segal, cognitive psychologist and professor
- Myrna Simpson, former research chemist
- S. J. Sindu, novels and instructor
- Balázs Szegedy, mathematician and former professor
- Imre Szeman, cultural theorist and professor
- Daniel Scott Tysdal, poet and lecturer in creative writing
- Fred Urquhart, former assistant professor of zoology who studied the migration of monarch butterflies
- Franco Vaccarino, former professor and principal
- Diana Valencia, associate professor of Physics and Astrophysics
- Jessica Wilson, professor of philosophy
- Frank Stronach, executive in residence
- Zubairu Wai, associate professor of Political Science and Global Development
- Mitzie Hunter, President and CEO of Canadian Women's Foundation, Former Minister of Education and Associate Minister of Finance

== In popular culture ==
The University of Toronto Scarborough has been used as a filming location for a number of films and music videos. Portions of Enemy (2013) directed by Denis Villeneuve, The Shape of Water (2017) directed by Guillermo del Toro, Dream Scenario (2023) directed by Kristoffer Borgli, and The Weeknd's music video for Secrets (2017) were shot on the campus. The campus's longstanding association with television and film production, as well as its architectural features that make it a notable filming site. The campus was also used by David Cronenberg as the location for his debut film Stereo in 1969.

== See also ==
- University of Toronto Campus Safety
- Education in Toronto
- History of Toronto
