= Scarborough Campus Students' Union =

Student union at the University of Toronto

- Institution: University of Toronto Scarborough
- Location: 1265 Military Trail; Student Centre room 108; Toronto, Ontario, Canada
- Established: 1966 (60 years ago)
- President: Kai Sealy (2026)
- Vice presidents: Operations: Rakshit Hegde; Academics and University Affairs: Kate Gallagher; Equity: Amal Elcharbini; Campus Life: Emeka Okolo; External: Fawzia Elhag
- Members: 14,000+
- Affiliations: CFS
- Mascot: Scar the Sabre
- Website: scsu.ca

The Scarborough Campus Students' Union (SCSU) is the elected representative body for full-time undergraduates registered at the Scarborough campus of the University of Toronto. It was established as the Scarborough Campus Students' Council (SCSC) in 1966.

The SCSU consists of six executives and 18 directors, in addition to several full-time staff, part-time staff, and student volunteers. It has led numerous student-driven initiatives, such as the construction of UTSC residences and the student centre and pro-Palestinian demonstrations in the face of the Gaza War. The SCSU's mascot is Scar the Sabre, a sabre-toothed tiger.

The SCSU is one of the five primary students' unions at the University of Toronto and maintains a partnership with the other four: the University of Toronto Students' Union, University of Toronto Mississauga Students' Union, Association of Part-time Undergraduate Students at the University of Toronto, and University of Toronto Graduate Students' Union. It is also affiliated as local 99 of the Canadian Federation of Students (CFS).

== Operations ==
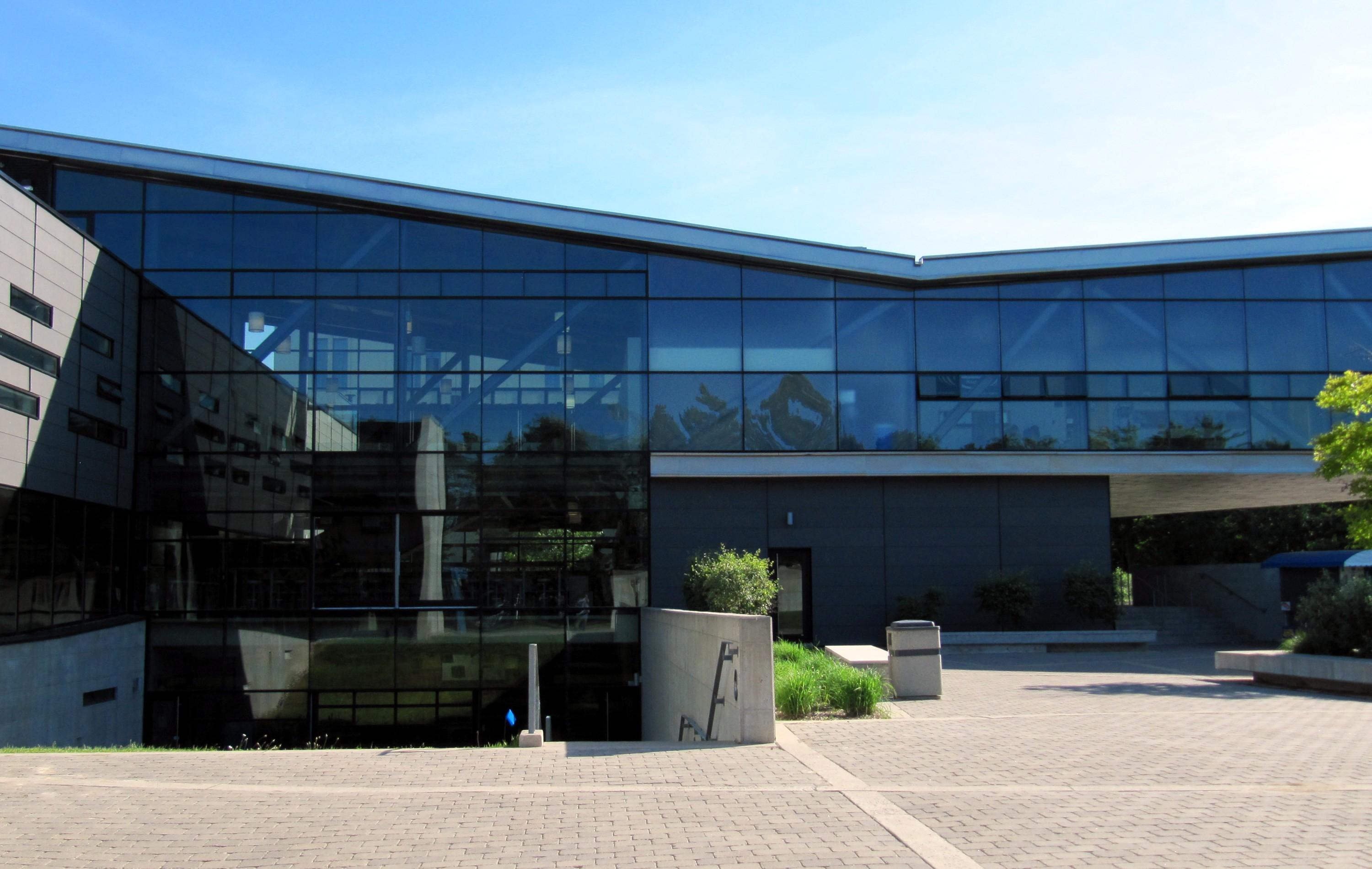
The SCSU is headquartered at the UTSC Student Centre

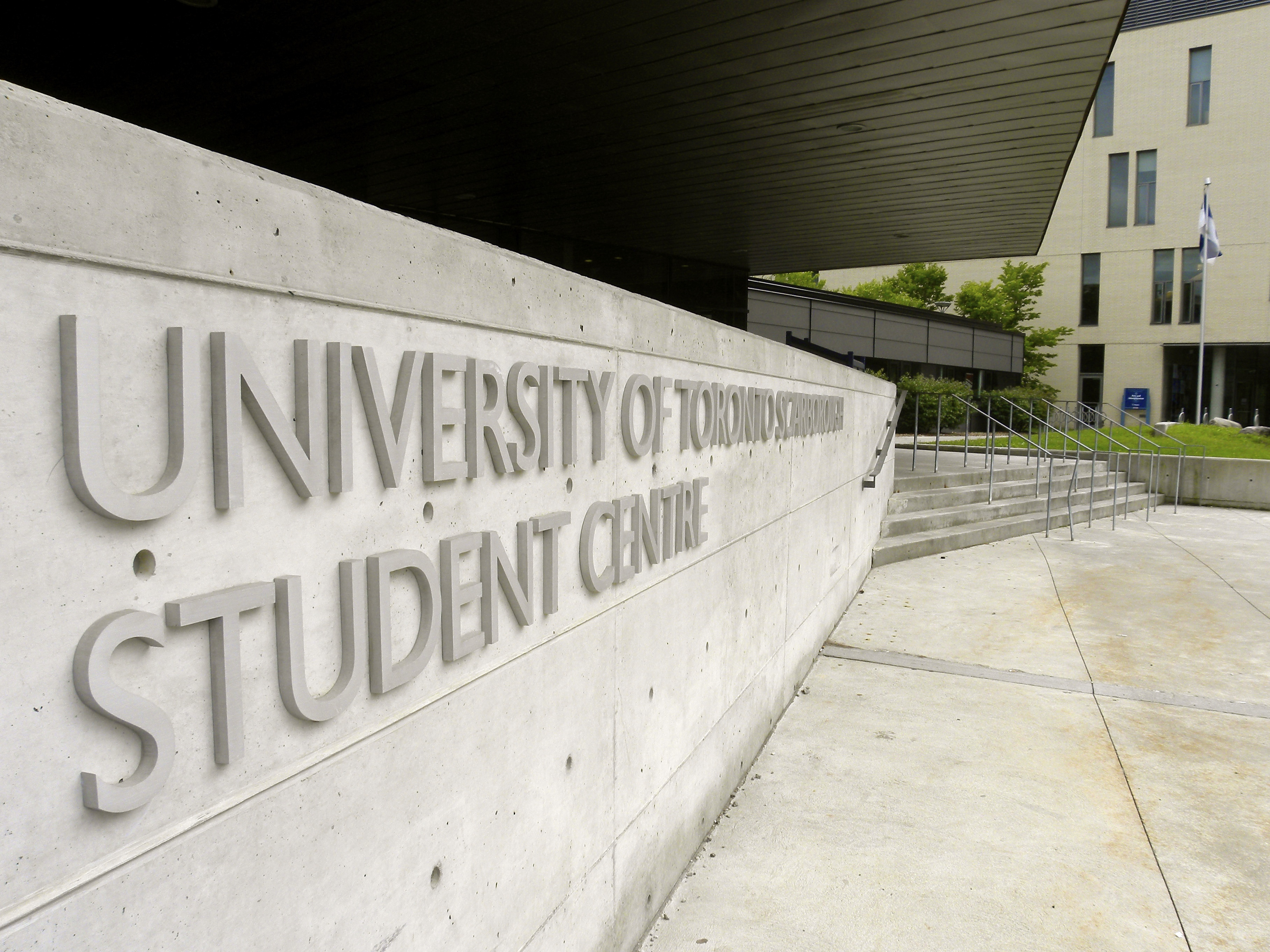
The UTSC Student Centre sign

The SCSU operates and manages the UTSC Student Centre, owns and runs the 1265 Bistro restaurant, supports and recognizes departmental student associations (DSAs) and clubs, and offers various services including bursaries, health and dental plans, lockers, photocopying, and graduation photos. The union also provides discounts, organizes events, and supports student initiatives across the Scarborough campus.

== Criticisms and controversy ==
Following the 2025–2026 SCSU general election, some candidates raised concerns about how the union had conducted the election. Concerns included claims that the SCSU did not follow the elections procedure code and the handling of 700 "spoiled" ballots. Candidates criticized the elections procedure code for its ambiguity and amount of discretion given to the Chief Returning Officer, who defended the election process and stated that "slander or unsubstantiated accusations" is "strictly prohibited," a response which itself garnered criticism.

== See also ==
- List of Ontario students' associations
