= Governing Council of the University of Toronto =

Governing body of the University of Toronto

Type
- Type: Unicameral
- Term limits: 9 years (consecutively)

History
- Founded: July 1, 1972; 54 years ago
- Preceded by: Board of Governors and Senate (1906–1972)

Leadership
- Chair: Sandra Hanington
- Vice-chair: Rajiv Mathur
- Chancellor: Wes Hall (ex officio)
- President: Melanie Woodin (ex officio)
- Secretary: Sheree Drummond

Structure
- Seats: 48 voting; 2 ex officio, non-voting
- Length of term: 1 year (students & presidential appointees); 3 years (others)
- Authority: University of Toronto Act, 1971
- Salary: None

Meeting place
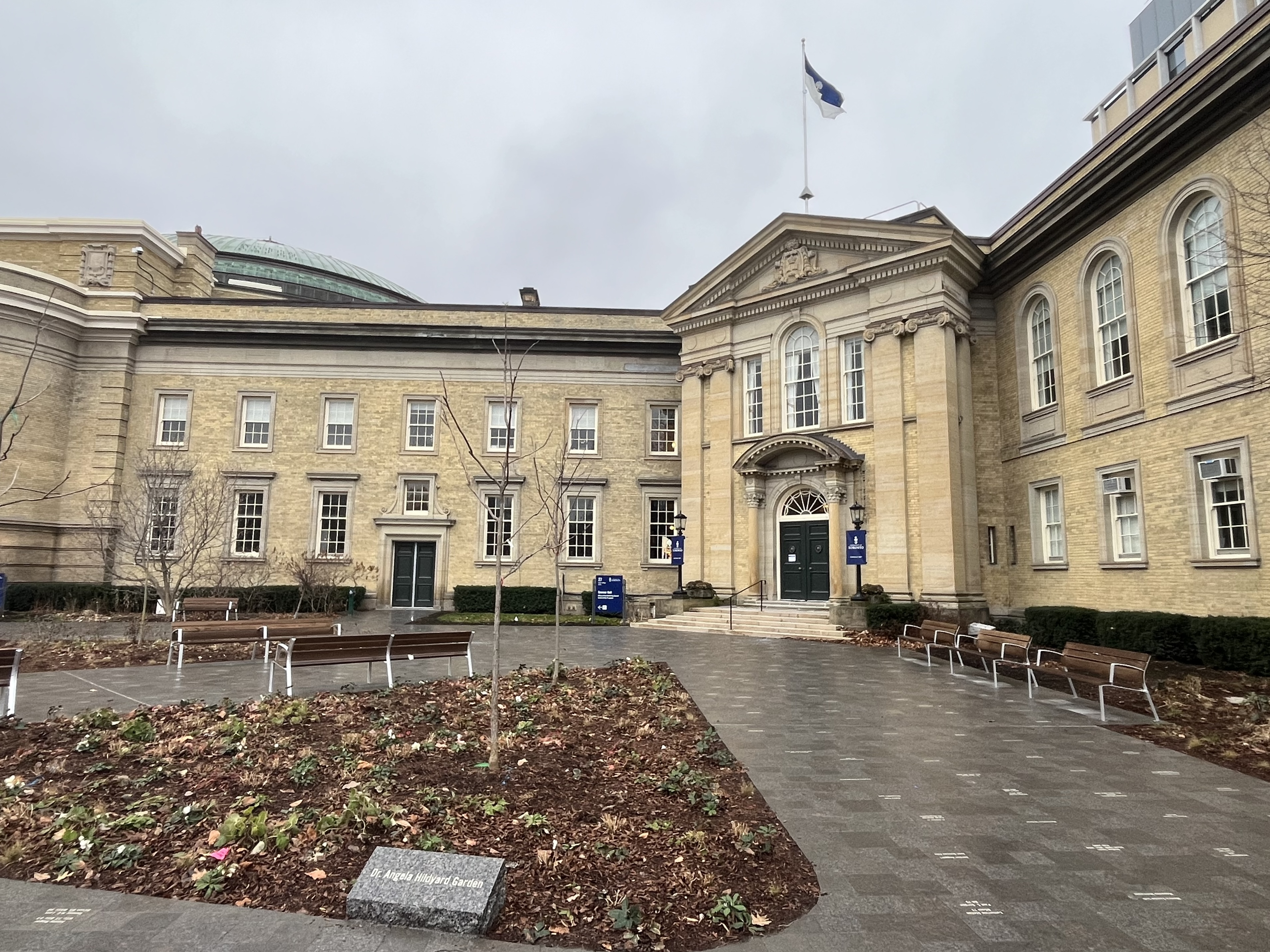
- Simcoe Hall; University of Toronto St. George; Toronto, Ontario, Canada

Website
- governingcouncil.utoronto.ca

The Governing Council of the University of Toronto (Note: French: Conseil d'administration de l'université de Toronto (used alternatively by the Government of Ontario).) is the unicameral governing body of the University of Toronto in Ontario, Canada. Established by the provincial University of Toronto Act, 1971, the council consists of 50 members and oversees the university's academic, business, and student affairs. It convenes in Simcoe Hall on the St. George campus.

While the Governing Council exercises its authority over all three University of Toronto campuses, its federated universities (Trinity College, Victoria University, and the University of St. Michael's College) maintain their own separate governing bodies.

== Composition ==
The Governing Council comprises 50 members:

- The chancellor and president (ex officio, non-voting)
- Two senior administrators appointed by the president
- 16 appointees of the Lieutenant Governor in Council
- Eight alumni
- 12 teaching staff
- Two administrative staff
- Eight students
  - Two graduate
  - Four full-time undergraduate
  - Two part-time undergraduate

Prior to July 1, 1972, the University of Toronto was governed by two separate bodies, the Senate and the Board of Governors. This bicameral structure was set out by The University Act, 1906 and followed recommendations of the Flavelle commission. The University of Toronto Act, 1971 superseded this structure with a unicameral Governing Council, unique among Canadian universities.

Among the Governing Council's 50 members, the chancellor and president of the university are ex officio. As a public university, 16 members are appointed by the Lieutenant Governor of Ontario on behalf of the Executive Council (Cabinet).

Members appointed by the Lieutenant Governor in Council and elected alumni, teaching and administrative staff serve for three-year terms. Members appointed by the president as well as elected students serve terms of one year. All members can serve for a maximum of nine consecutive years.

== Governance bodies ==
The Governing Council oversees several governance bodies including boards, campus councils, and committees.

=== Campus councils ===
Created on July 1, 2013, the University of Toronto Mississauga (UTM) Campus Council and the University of Toronto Scarborough (UTSC) Campus Council oversee campus-specific matters assigned by the Governing Council for the Mississauga and Scarborough campuses, respectively. Each comprises 28 members, eight or nine of which are appointed by the Governing Council. The principal of each campus serves as an ex officio voting member of their respective campus council.

== List of chairs and vice-chairs of the council ==
The Governing Council elects a chair and vice-chair to preside over meetings. The following is a list of all chairs and vice-chairs since 1972.

| Chair | Vice-chair | Term |
|---|---|---|
| Charles Malim Harding | William Bowles Harris | 1972–1975 |
| Charles Malim Harding | Sydney M. Hermant | 1975–1976 |
| Marnie Paikin | Sydney M. Hermant | 1976–1978 |
| Marnie Paikin | William Hartley | 1978–1980 |
| Terence Albert Wardrop | Edwin Kendall Cork | 1980–1982 |
| John (Jack) A. Whitten | William John Corcoran | 1982–1984 |
| St. Clair Balfour III | William A. M. Birt | 1984–1985 |
| St. Clair Balfour III | Joan R. Randall | 1985–1988 |
| Joan R. Randall | John R. Gardner | 1988–1989 |
| Robert James McGavin | Annamarie P. Castrilli | 1989–1993 |
| Annamarie P. Castrilli | F. Anthony Comper | 1993–1995 |
| F. Anthony Comper | Wendy M. Cecil | 1995–1998 |
| Wendy M. Cecil | Mary Anne V. Chambers | 1998–2001 |
| Wendy M. Cecil | Thomas H. Simpson | 2001–2002 |
| Thomas H. Simpson | Rose M. Patten | 2002–2004 |
| Rose M. Patten | John F. (Jack) Petch | 2004–2007 |
| John F. (Jack) Petch | Alice Dong | 2007–2010 |
| John F. (Jack) Petch | Richard B. Nunn | 2010–2011 |
| Richard B. Nunn | Judy G. Goldring | 2011–2013 |
| Judy G. Goldring | Shirley Hoy | 2013–2016 |
| Shirley Hoy | N. Jane Pepino | 2016–2017 |
| Claire M.C. Kennedy | N. Jane Pepino | 2017–2020 |
| Claire M.C. Kennedy | Brian D. Lawson | 2020–2021 |
| Brian D. Lawson | Janet L. Ecker | 2021–2022 |
| Janet L. Ecker | Anna Kennedy | 2022–2023 |
| Anna Kennedy | Sandra Hanington | 2023–2026 |
| Sandra Hanington | Rajiv Mathur | 2026–present |
