= Woodin =

Woodin is a surname. Notable people with the surname include:

- Melanie Woodin, Canadian neuroscientist and academic administrator
- Mike Woodin (1965–2004), UK politician
- Sarah Woodin, American biologist
- W. Hugh Woodin (born 1955), US mathematician
- William B. Woodin (1824–1893), New York politician
- William Hartman Woodin (1868–1934), US Secretary of Treasury

== See also ==
- Woodin cardinal
