= Paul Kurdyak =

Canadian psychiatrist

Paul Andrew Kurdyak is a Canadian psychiatrist and highly regarded expert in mental health.

== Early life and education ==
Born as Paul Andrew Kurdyak he has a degree in medicine, and completed his psychiatry residency and his PhD in clinical epidemiology at the University of Toronto.

== Career ==
Kurdyak works in Toronto as a psychiatrist and is the vice-president at Ontario’s Mental Health and Addictions Centre of Excellence. He is the Director of Health Outcomes and Performance Evaluation at the Institute for Mental Health Policy Research and Medical Director of Performance Improvement at the Centre for Addiction and Mental Health. He is an associate editor of The Canadian Journal of Psychiatry.

Kurdyak is a highly regarded expert in mental health and an advocate for increasing and improving access to mental health care in Canada. He received the Alexander Leighton Award in Psychiatric Epidemiology from the Canadian Academy of Psychiatric Epidemiology in 2022.

== Selected publications ==
- Paul Kurdyak and Sanjeev Sockalingam, How Canada fails people with mental illnesses, Ottawa Citizen, 2020
- John Cairney, Sima Gandhi, Astrid Guttmann, Karey Iron, Saba Khan, Paul Kurdyak, Kelvin Lam, & Julie Yang, Mental Health of Children and Youth in Ontario: A Baseline Scorecard, ICES, 2015
