= Simcoe Hall =

Building at the University of Toronto St. George

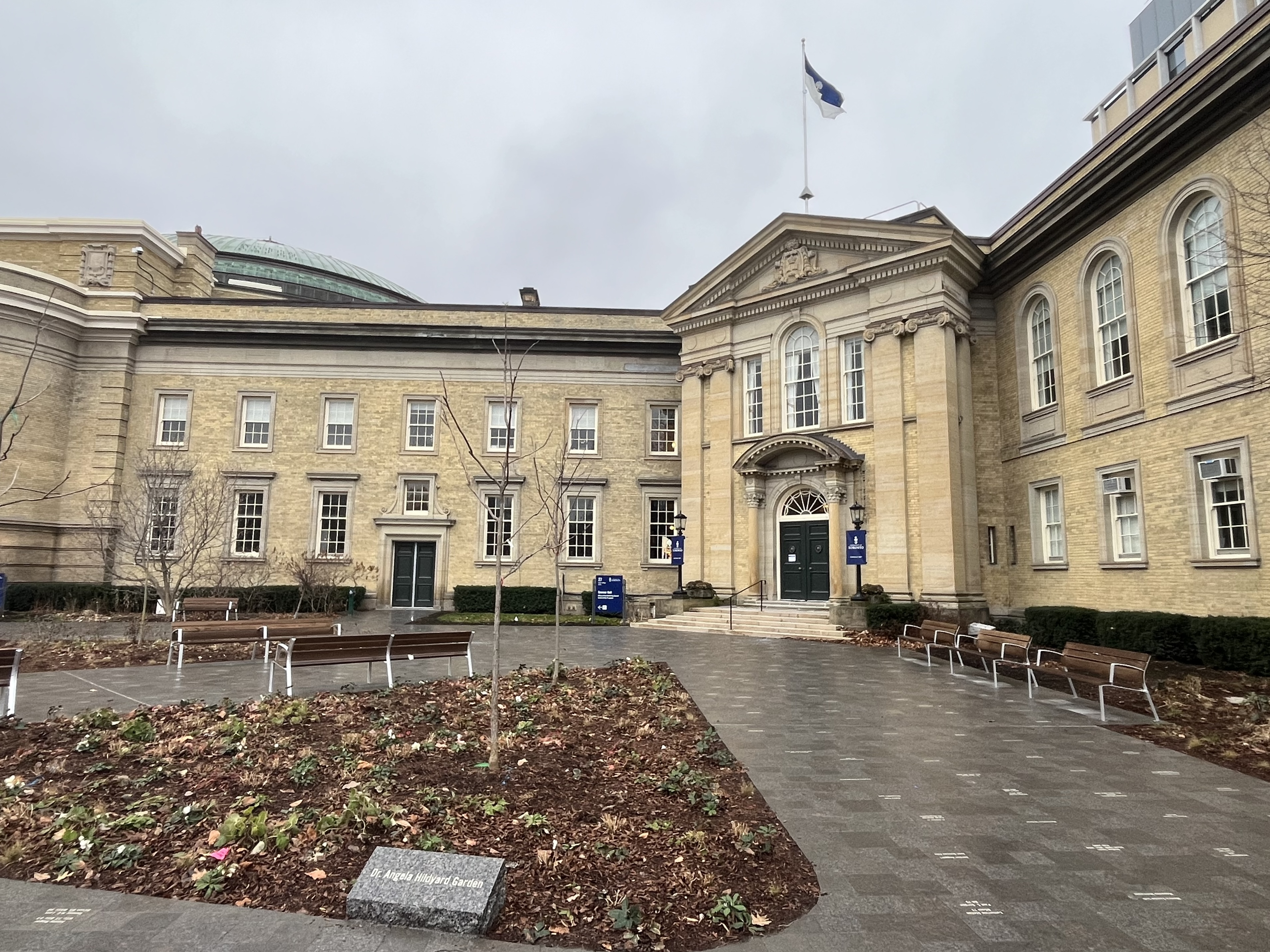
- The building's front facade in 2023

General information
- Location: 27 King's College Circle; Toronto, Ontario, Canada
- Coordinates: 43°39′39″N 79°23′45″W
- Current tenants: Office of the Governing Council; Office of the President
- Named for: John Graves Simcoe
- Completed: 1924
- Owner: University of Toronto

Design and construction
- Architecture firm: Darling and Pearson

Ontario Heritage Act
- Criteria: Listed
- Designated: 1973

Simcoe Hall is a building on the St. George campus of the University of Toronto which houses the university's central administration. Completed in 1924, it contains the offices of both the university's Governing Council and president. Simcoe Hall is located in downtown Toronto, Ontario, and named for John Graves Simcoe, the first lieutenant governor of Upper Canada. A listed heritage building, it is conjoined with Convocation Hall. The phrase "Simcoe Hall" is also used as a metonym to refer to the University of Toronto's administration.

== History ==
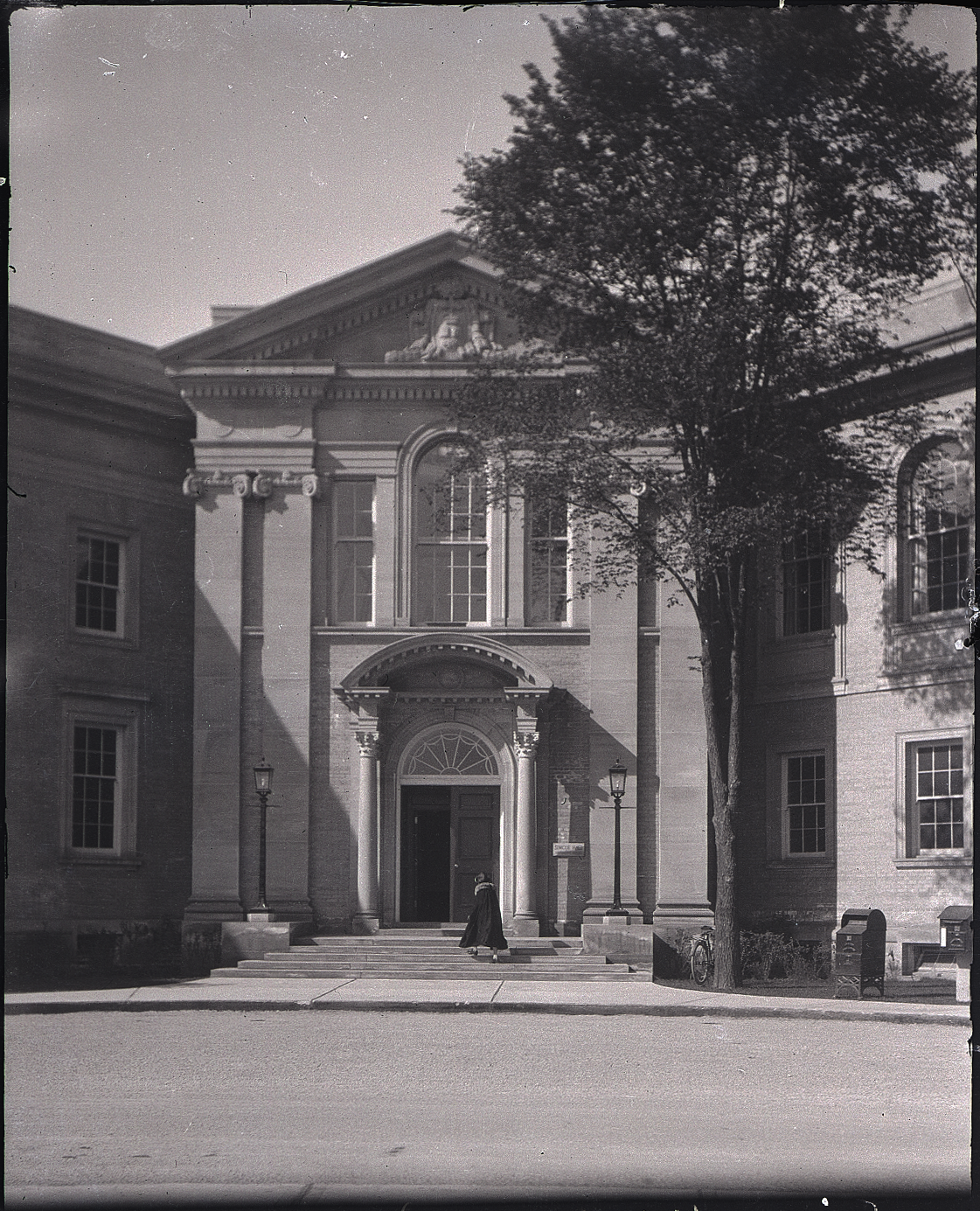
Simcoe Hall in 1924

Before the construction of Simcoe Hall, offices of the university's administration were located in the Junior Common Room at University College. During a time of financial hardship for the university during the 1920s, it relied on regular grants from the provincial government to make up its deficit. A grant was given to construct a new administration building and Simcoe Hall was completed in 1923, 17 years after Convocation Hall. That year, the university's administration moved to the new building which allowed the University College Literary and Athletic Society to operate out of the Junior Common Room as it does to this day.

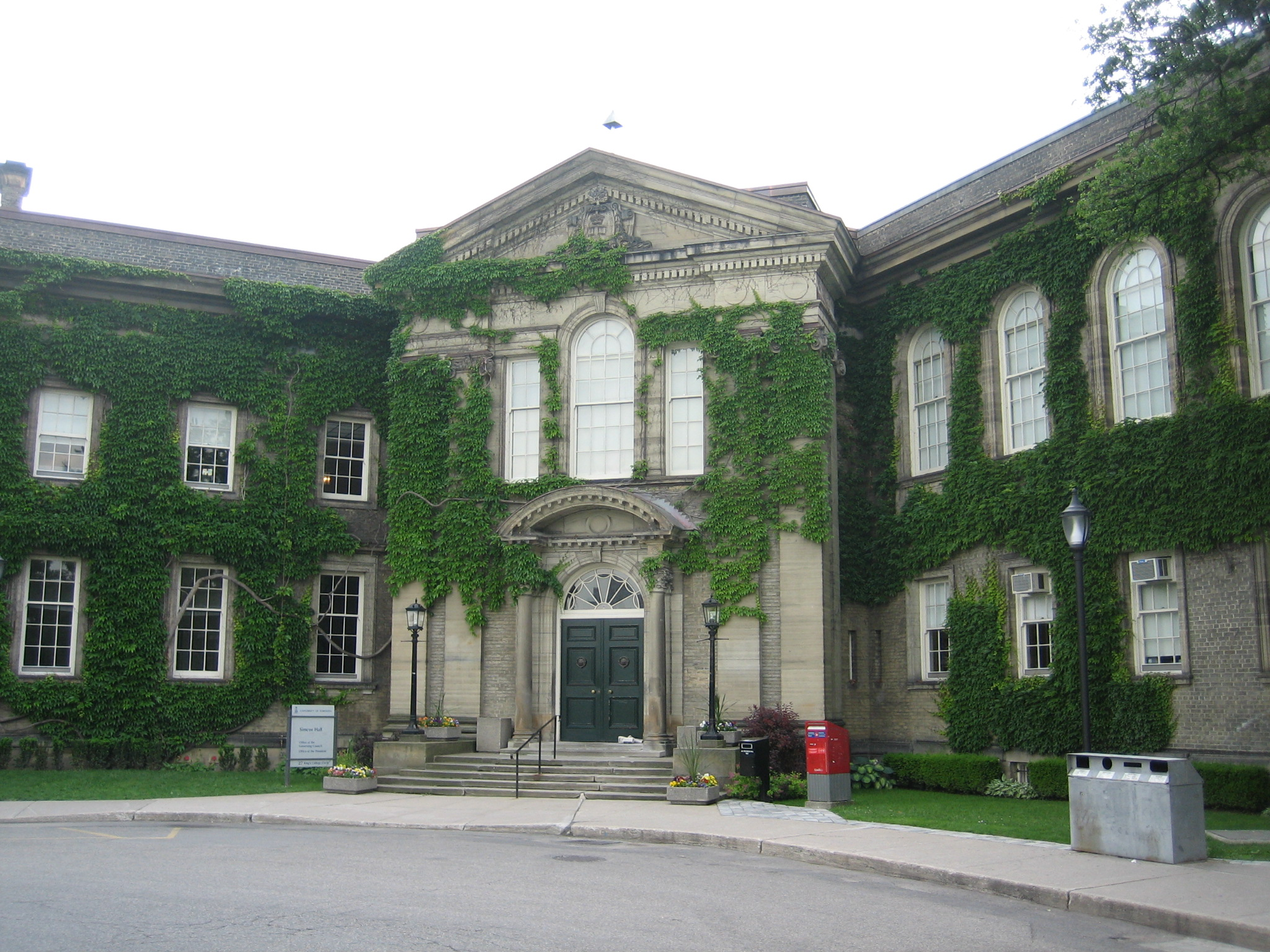
The building's front façade before its 2019 restoration

Several buildings in the historic core of the St. George campus were listed in the City of Toronto's Heritage Register in 1973, including Simcoe Hall. In 2019, exterior restorations of Simcoe Hall and Convocation Hall were completed in which overgrown ivy was removed and stained bricks were carefully power-washed.

=== Student protests and occupations ===
In January of 1969, a speech by U of T president Claude Bissell was interrupted by students protesting a public lecture to be given by Clark Kerr at the university. Kerr, who was president of the University of California in the U.S. during the Free Speech Movement of 1964, was controversial among students, and U of T's administration became wary that a sit-in might take place similar to what had occurred in California. After student protesters at Sir George Williams University had destroyed its main computer, the Caput, U of T's disciplinary body, endorsed a recommendation from the committee of Ontario university presidents which suggested that it "might be necessary to use strong tactics to counter threatening student protests." The Students' Administrative Council (SAC) demanded that Bissell disavow the statements, and gave him a week to do so after he initially refused. Threats of an occupation of Simcoe Hall were shared, and The Varsity called for a sit-in on the morning of the deadline. Bissell, however, delivered what the SAC found to be a satisfactory response and further protest was avoided.

In March 1970, a building on the St. George campus which was slated to be demolished to build Innis College had been taken over by women's groups who wanted $2000 from U of T for its renovation, claiming there were insufficient daycare facilities on campus. Led by philosophy professor Lorenne Smith, supporters of daycare demonstrated outside of Simcoe Hall demanding that Bissell speak with them. After he refused, approximately 200 demonstrators, many of whom brought their children, occupied Simcoe Hall's senate chamber and hung banners out of the windows, one of which read "Infants of the World Unite, You Have Nothing to Lose but Your Diapers." The occupation ended when Bissell vowed to find the $2000 initially requested.

In 1972, a year-long conflict between undergraduate U of T students and the Governing Council was sparked by the opening of Robarts Library. Co-editor of The Varsity Linda McQuaig discovered that the university planned to limit access of the library's stacks to faculty members, graduate students, and fourth-year undergraduates. Following the story's publication, several large protests took place which were organized by the SAC and supported by the Graduate Students' Union (GSU). About 75 people entered the senate chamber of Simcoe Hall and refused to leave until the Governing Council granted open stack access to all undergraduates. Officers of the Toronto Police Service broke through the senate chamber door to enter and evicted around 25 sit-in participants, 14 of whom were charged with trespassing including SAC president Bob Spencer and Varsity co-editor Thomas Walkom, and four more were charged with trespassing and assault. The next day there was a student rally in Convocation Hall and another occupation of the senate chamber which was participated by more than 500 people. The mob was addressed by interim president Jack Sword who capitulated on behalf of the administration. The trespassing charges were dropped, however three protesters were convicted of more serious charges.

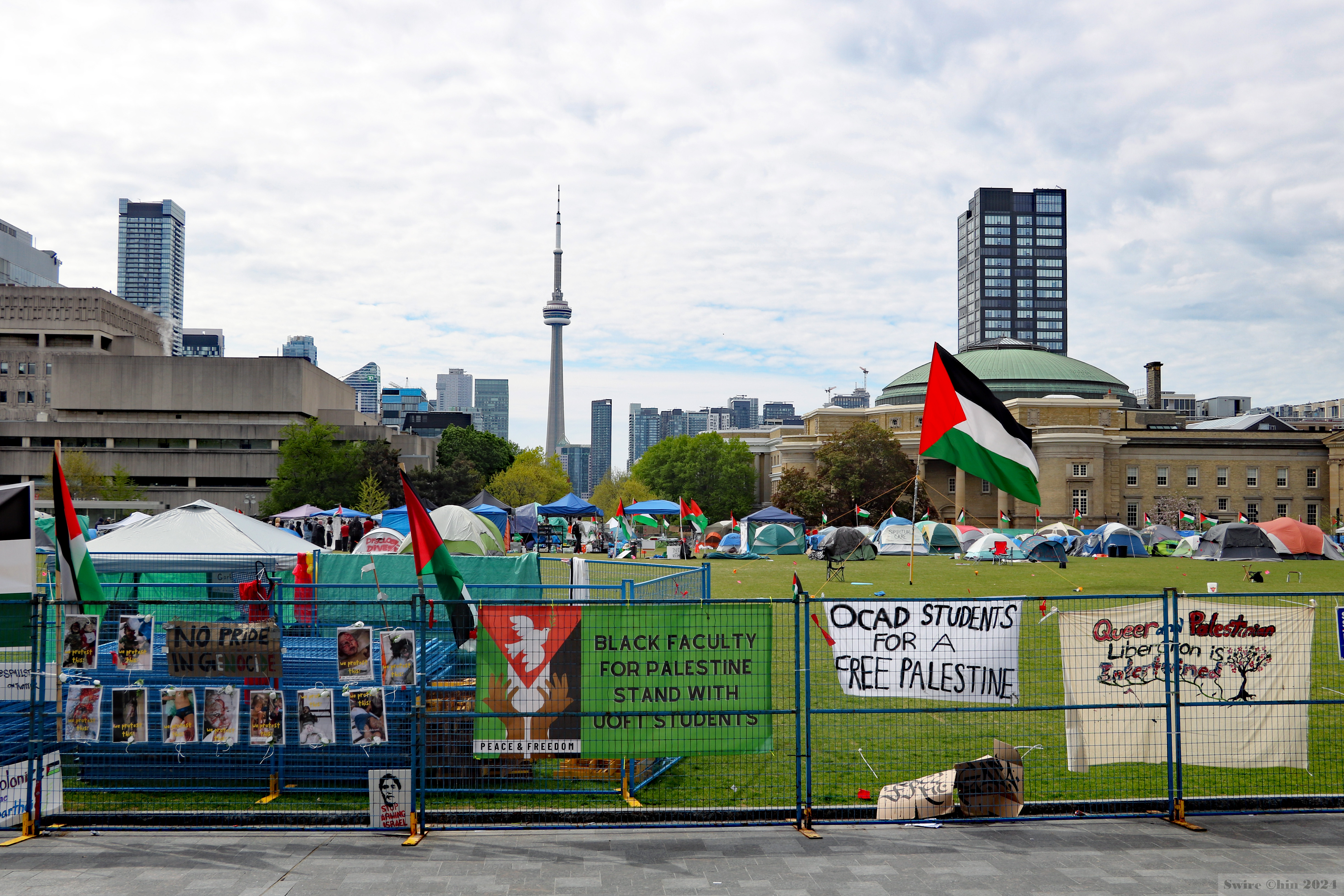
King's College Circle and Simcoe Hall (right) during the 2024 pro-Palestinian encampment

In 2024 the University of Toronto's partnerships with two Israeli universities – the Hebrew University of Jerusalem and Technion University – drew controversy following the beginning of the Gaza war. A student group dubbed UofT Occupy for Palestine [sic] called on U of T to divest from the aforementioned Israeli institutions, particularly the former which operates buildings on land outside of Israel's borders recognized under international law. After repeated calls for U of T to disclose its investments, an occupation began in Simcoe Hall on April 1 when a group of 26 students from UofT Occupy for Palestine entered the building and gathered outside then-president Meric Gertler's office while he was not present. Campus Safety special constables restricted any additional students from entering, and blocked food and supplies from entering the building during the occupation. That night, Gertler sent a letter to the protesters acknowledging that he had received the group's demands and requested that they leave. The occupation did not end until 26 hours later on April 3 when Gertler agreed to meet with students. Since the 2024 occupation ended, participating students raised allegations towards Campus Safety officers involved. Alleged misconduct included "sexual harassment; voyeurism; sleep deprivation tactics; intentionally restricted ventilation; intentional 'abuse of the building's thermostat'; restricted access to food; as well as restricted access to the press." The university commissioned Henein Hutchison Robitaille LLP, a private law firm, to investigate the allegations. The occupation was a precursor to the 2024 pro-Palestinian encampment in King's College Circle which lasted over two months.

== Architecture ==
Simcoe Hall was designed by the architecture firm Darling and Pearson who were also responsible for Convocation Hall to which it is conjoined. Four rectangular stone pillars that flank the main door are of Credit Valley sandstone quarried in the Greater Toronto Area. The building's front façade is made of yellow stone bricks which had to be carefully restored as to not damage their original coarseness and texture.

== See also ==
- List of University of Toronto buildings
