= Stukel =

Stukel is a surname. Notable people with the surname include:

- James J. Stukel (born 1937), American educator and university president
- Thérèse Stukel (fl. 1973), Canadian statistician
