= List of chancellors of the University of Toronto =

Chancellor Michael Wilson at a convocation ceremony in 2015

The University of Toronto has had 35 chancellors since it was founded in 1827 as King's College.

The chancellor is elected by a College of Electors composed of university alumni, and appointed by the University of Toronto Governing Council. Set out by the University of Toronto Act, 1971, the position has a term limit of three years for a maximum of two terms per officeholder. As the ceremonial head of the University of Toronto, the chancellor serves as chair of convocation and confers all degrees. The chancellor is also an ex-officio member of the Governing Council, alongside the president.

== Chancellors ==
Order	Name	Years in office
1	Sir Peregrine Maitland	1827–1828
2	Sir John Colborne	1828–1835
3	Sir Francis Bond Head	1836–1838
4	Sir George Arthur	1838–1841
5	Charles Poulett Thomson, 1st Baron Sydenham	1841
6	Sir Charles Bagot	1842–1843
7	Charles Metcalfe, 1st Baron Metcalfe	1843–1845
8	Charles Cathcart, 2nd Earl Cathcart	1846–1847
9	James Bruce, 8th Earl of Elgin	1847–1849
10	Peter Boyle de Blaquière	1850–1852
11	William Hume Blake	1853–1856
12	Robert Easton Burns	1856–1863
13	George Skeffington Connor	1863
14	Joseph Curran Morrison	1863–1876
15	The Hon. Edward Blake	1876–1900
16	Sir William Ralph Meredith	1900–1923
17	Sir Edmund Walker	1923–1924
18	The Right Hon. Sir William Mulock	1924–1944
19	The Rev. Henry John Cody	1944–1947
20	The Right Hon. Vincent Massey	1947–1953
21	Samuel Beatty	1953–1959
22	François Charles Archile Jeanneret	1959–1965
23	Omond Solandt	1965–1971
24	The Hon. Pauline Mills McGibbon	1971–1974
25	Eva Waddell Mader Macdonald	1974–1977
26	The Very Rev. Arthur B. B. Moore	1977–1980
27	George Ignatieff	1980–1986
28	The Hon. John Black Aird	1986–1991
29	Rose Wolfe	1991–1997
30	The Hon. Hal Jackman	1997–2003
31	The Hon. Vivienne Poy	2003–2006
32	The Hon. David Peterson	2006–2012
33	The Hon. Michael Wilson	2012–2018
34	Rose Patten	2018–2024
35	Wes Hall	2024–present
