= President of the University of Toronto =

Executive head of public university

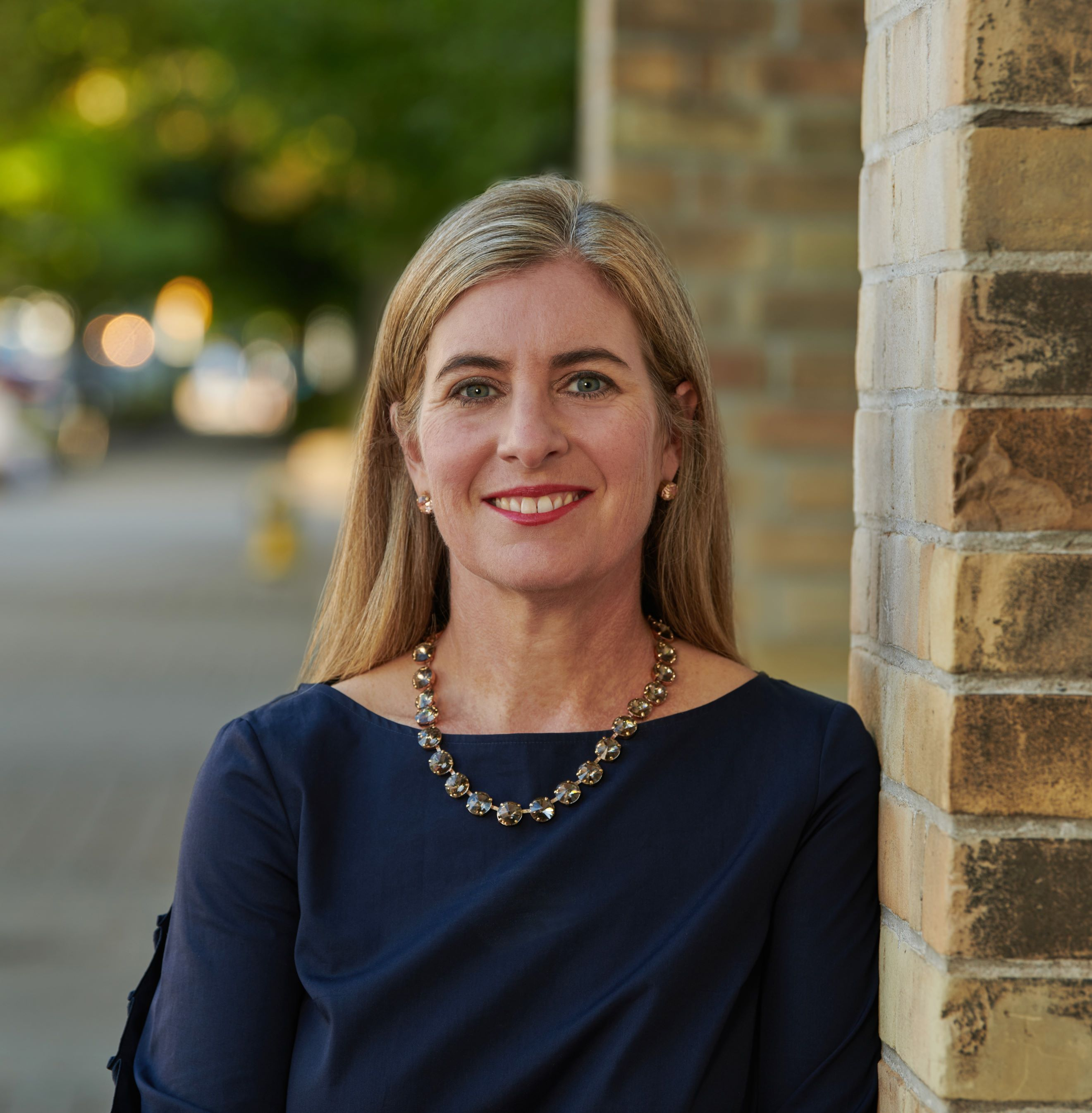
- Incumbent; Melanie Woodin since July 1, 2025
- Residence: 93 Highland Avenue
- Seat: Simcoe Hall
- Appointer: Governing Council of the University of Toronto
- Constituting instrument: University of Toronto Act
- Formation: 1827
- First holder: John Strachan
- Salary: $483,000 per annum (2025)
- Website: president.utoronto.ca

The president of the University of Toronto is the executive head of the University of Toronto, appointed by the university's Governing Council. 17 people have held the office since the university was founded as King's College in 1827.

As set out by the University of Toronto Act, the president is an ex officio member of the Governing Council of the University of Toronto alongside the chancellor, who is the university's ceremonial head. The office of the president is located in Simcoe Hall on the St. George campus, and the official residence for the officeholder is 93 Highland Avenue in the Rosedale neighbourhood of Toronto.

The University of Toronto's current president is Melanie Woodin, who is the first woman to hold the position in the university's 200-year history. She took office on July 1, 2025 after serving as dean of the Faculty of Arts and Science since 2019.

== History ==
The first president of King's College, the predecessor institution to the University of Toronto, was John Strachan, the first Anglican Bishop of Toronto. He had long advocated for the establishment of a university in Upper Canada and took the role of its inaugural head after its royal charter was issued by King George IV in 1827. The university was closely aligned with the Church of England, and anticipating the institution's secularization, Strachan resigned to establish Trinity College, which later federated with the university.

John McCaul took over as president in 1848 and the university adopted its present name in 1850, severing its ties with the Church of England. A restructuring occurred in 1853 when University College was established as the university's teaching arm, with the president of University College now the de facto head of the University of Toronto. Holding the leadership of the university from 1848 to 1880, McCaul is regarded as the longest-serving president. Since University College was founded, no role of a university-wide president existed until The University Act, 1901, which re-established the office of president while renaming the head of University College as principal. In 1892, James Loudon became the first Canadian-born president, serving until 1906.

Unlike many Canadian universities, the president of the University of Toronto does not hold the title of vice-chancellor. A role of vice-chancellor previously existed at the university, however it was separate from that of the president and permanently suspended by The University Act, 1906.

== Presidents ==
The following is a list of people who have led the University of Toronto since 1827:

No.	Portrait	Name	Term start	Term end	Ref.
President of King's College (1827–1850)
1		The Right Rev. John Strachan	1827	1848	
President of the University of Toronto (1850–1853)
President of University College (1853–1901)
2		The Rev. John McCaul	1848	1880	
3		Sir Daniel Wilson	1880	1892	
President of the University of Toronto (1901–present)
4		James Loudon	1892	1906	
acting		Maurice Hutton	1906	1907	
5		Sir Robert Falconer	1907	1932	
6		The Rev. Henry John Cody	1932	1945	
7		The Hon. Sidney Earle Smith	1945	1957	
acting		Moffat St. Andrew Woodside	September 1957	July 1958	
8		Claude Bissell	1958	1971	
acting		John H. Sword	1971	1972	
9		John Robert Evans	1972	1978	
10		James Milton Ham	1978	1983	
11		David Strangway	1983	1984	
12		George Connell	1984	1990	
13		Robert Prichard	1990	2000	
14		Robert Birgeneau	2000	2004	
interim		Frank Iacobucci	September 2004	June 30, 2005	
acting		Vivek Goel	July 1, 2005	September 30, 2005	
15		C. David Naylor	October 1, 2005	October 31, 2013	
16		Meric Gertler	November 1, 2013	June 30, 2025	
17		Melanie Woodin	July 1, 2025	incumbent	

== See also ==
Lists of vice-presidents of the University of Toronto:

- List of principals of the University of Toronto Mississauga
- List of principals of the University of Toronto Scarborough
- List of provosts of the University of Toronto
