= Daniel Wilson (academic) =

Scottish-born Canadian archaeologist, ethnologist and author (1816–1892)

Sir Daniel Wilson
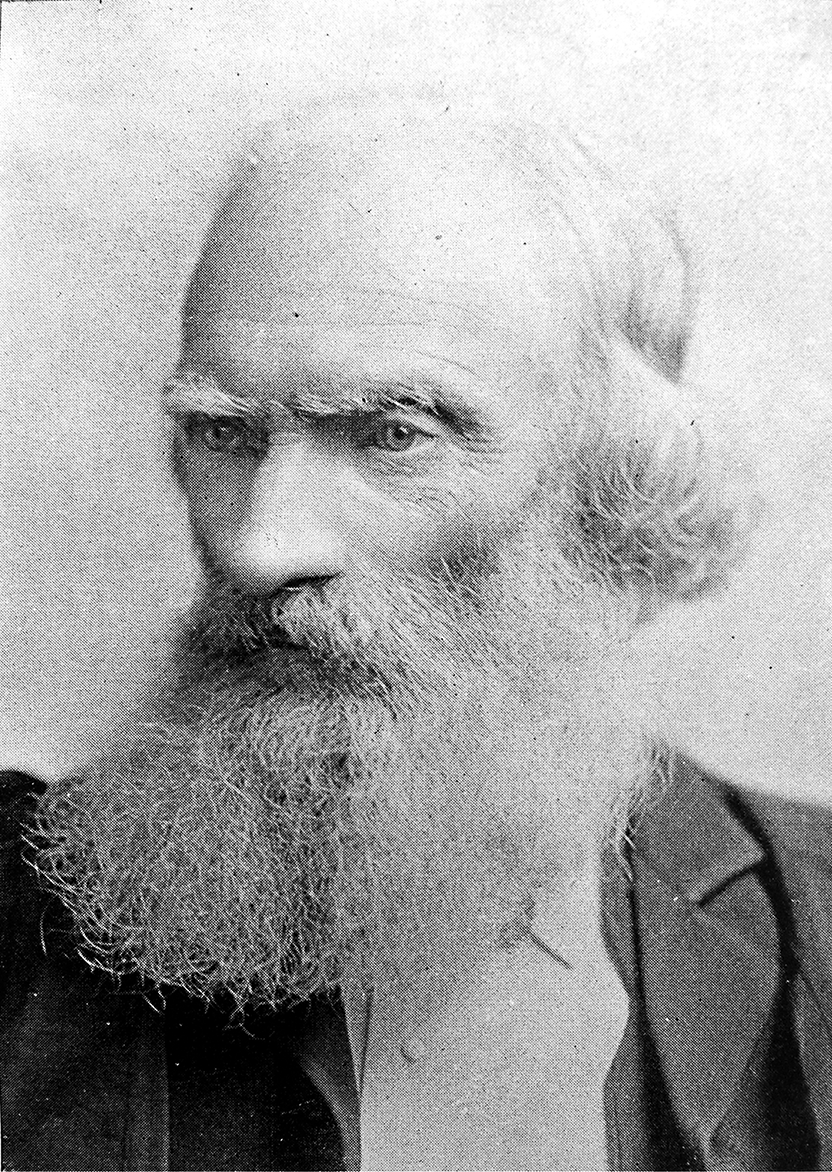

2nd President of University College, Toronto (Note: The role of President of University College superseded presidency of the University of Toronto in 1853. Wilson was the third head of the university and is thus also considered to be the third president of the University of Toronto, the current role which was re-established in 1901.)
- In office 1880–1892
- Preceded by: John McCaul
- Succeeded by: James Loudon

Personal details
- Born: January 5, 1816 Edinburgh, Scotland
- Died: August 6, 1892 (aged 76) Toronto, Ontario

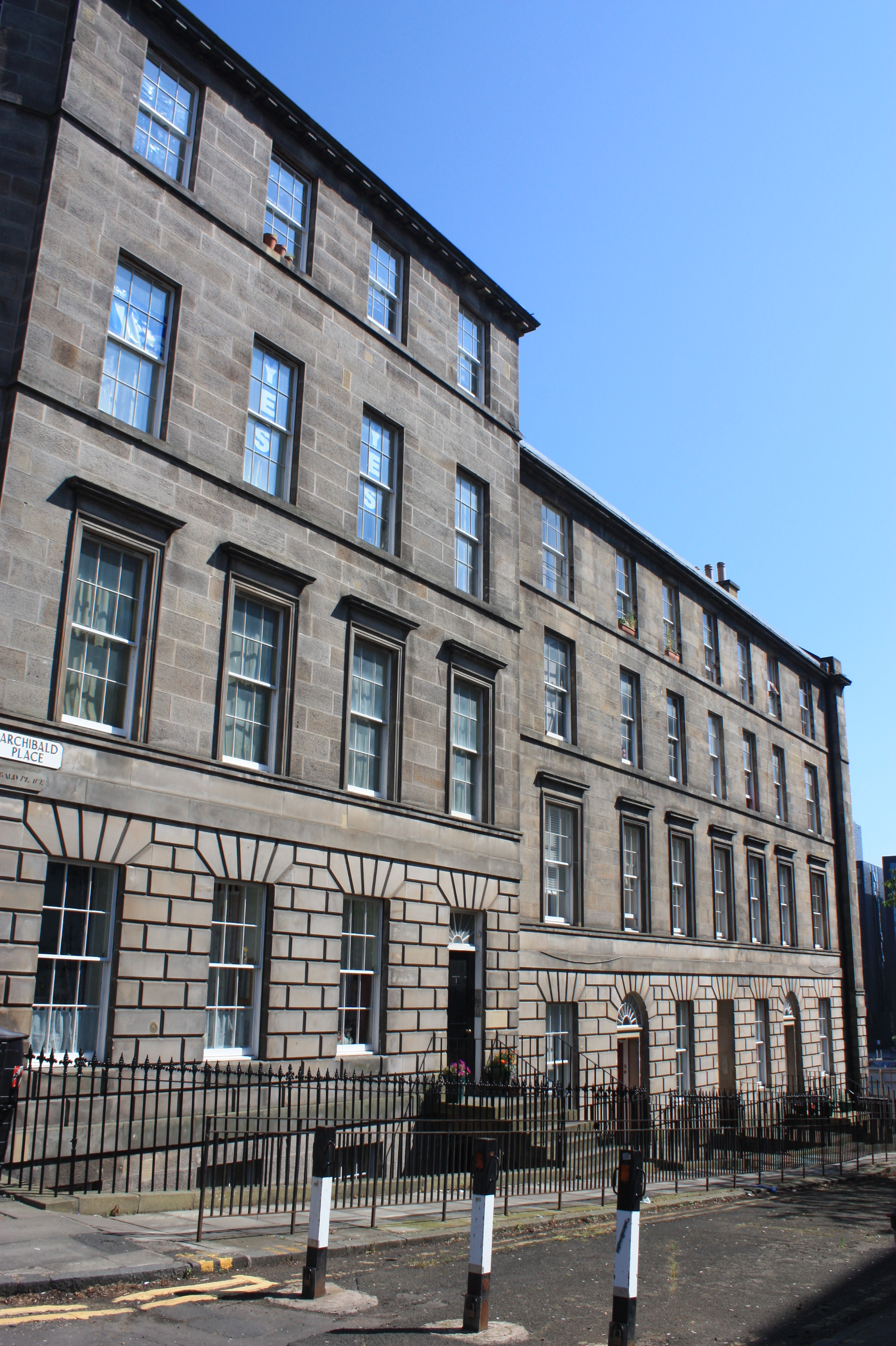
Archibald Place, Edinburgh

Sir Daniel Wilson FRSC FSA (Scot) FRSE LLD (January 5, 1816 – August 6, 1892) was a Scottish-born Canadian archaeologist, ethnologist and author. He served as the third president of the University of Toronto from 1880 to 1892, a role known as president of University College between 1853 and 1901.

== Life ==
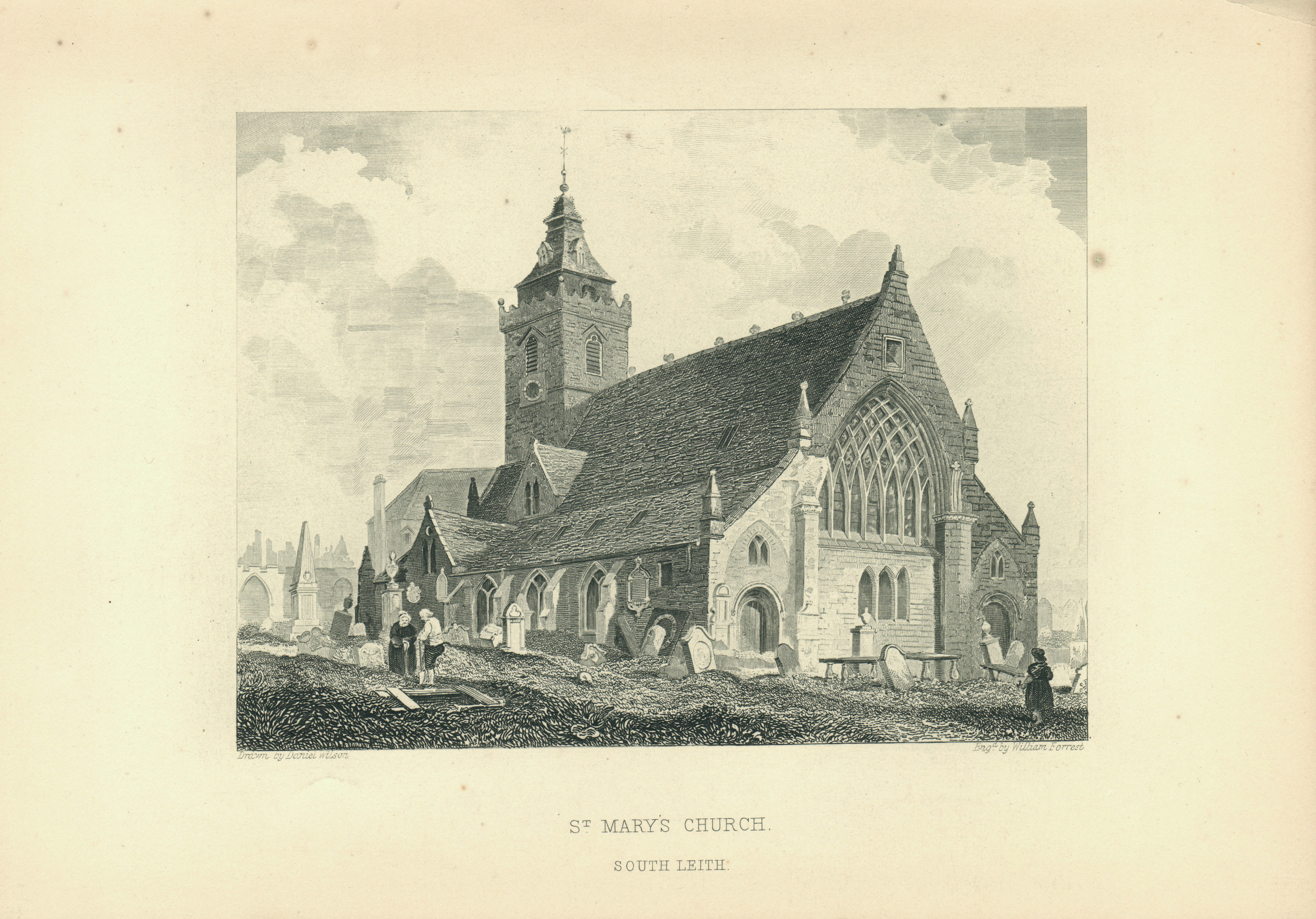
St Mary's Church South Leith, from a drawing by Wilson, showing the church as it was before 1836

Wilson was born at 55 Potterow in Edinburgh on 3 January 1816, the son of Archibald Wilson and his wife, Janet Aitken. His father is listed in directories as a book-binder, but some records state he was a wine-dealer. He was educated at the Royal High School. He was apprenticed as an engraver around 1830 then went to London, and worked in the studio of J. M. W. Turner. His skills as a watercolour painter came back into play much later in his career.

Wilson returned to Edinburgh in 1842, and was appointed Secretary of the Society of Antiquaries of Scotland in 1845. He corresponded with Christian Jürgensen Thomsen and J. J. A. Worsaae, who had established the exhibition of the prehistoric material in the Danish national museum in Copenhagen in terms of the Three-age system – the succession of a Stone Age by a Bronze Age and an Iron Age. He organized the display of the Society's museum after the same chronological scheme, the first to emulate the Copenhagen museum.

In 1845 he is listed as a "printseller and artist's colourman" with premises at 25 Hanover Street and living at 32 Broughton Place.

In 1848 Wilson published Memorials of Edinburgh in the Olden Time, of which the chief value lies in the numerous illustrations, done by himself It was an important record of the many historic buildings that were at risk or were being lost in the rapid development of central Edinburgh. In 1851 he published The Archaeology and Prehistoric Annals of Scotland, which introduced the word prehistoric into the English archaeological vocabulary – he probably translated it from the Danish word "forhistorie" as used by Thomsen and Worsaae.

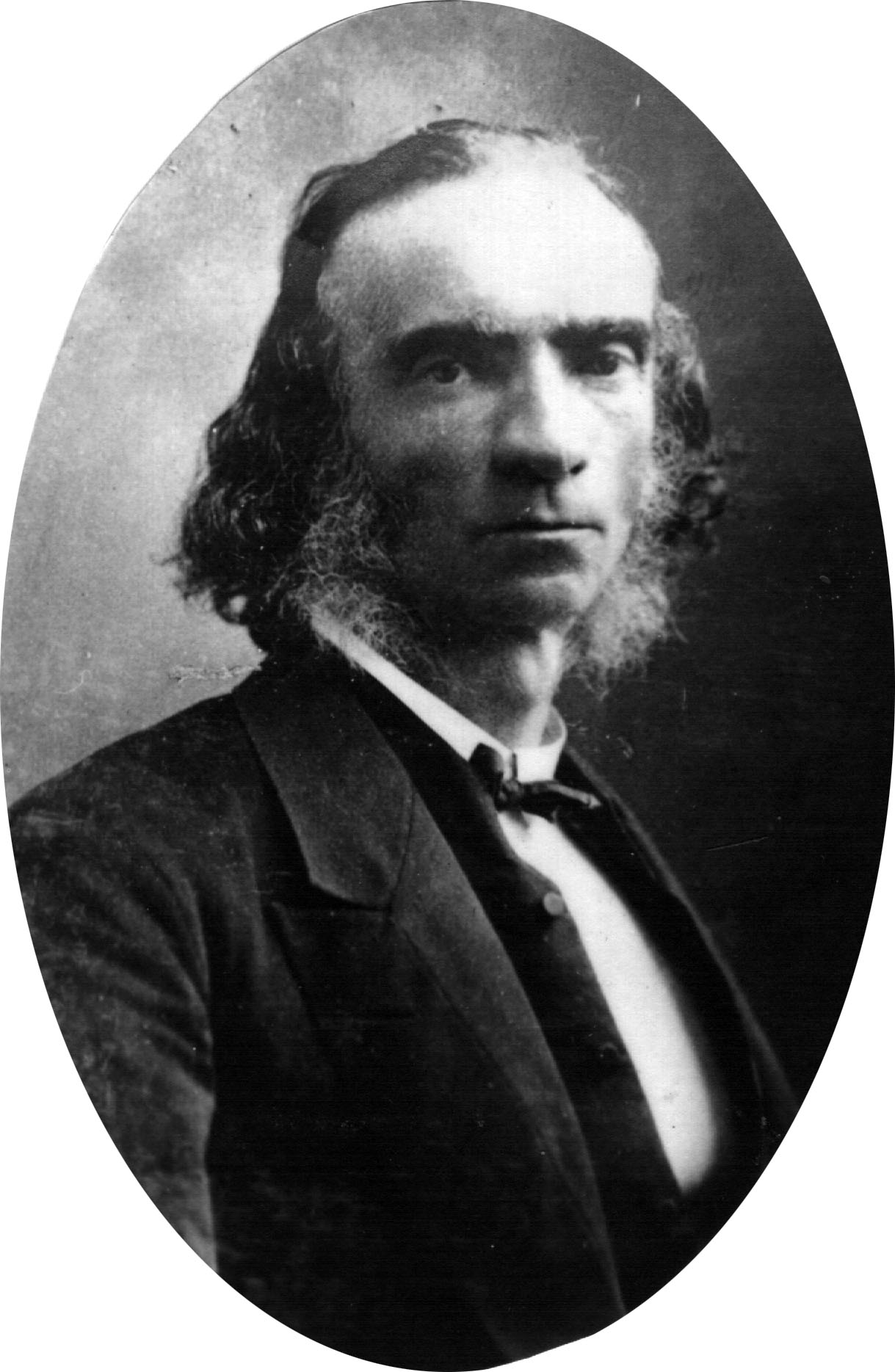
Portrait of Sir Daniel Wilson, c. 1860

His final years in Edinburgh were spent at 17 Archibald Place, near George Heriot's School.

In 1853 Wilson left Scotland to take up the post of Professor of History and English Literature in Toronto. In addition to his teaching duties, he kept up his interests in natural history, geology, and was very interested in the ethnography of the indigenous groups that he encountered on his vacation treks. Many of his watercolour sketches of landscapes and encampments of hunter-gatherer groups are now in the Canadian national archives in Ottawa. His brother George Wilson had become the first director of a new national museum in Edinburgh (now the National Museums of Scotland), and Daniel Wilson actively collected ethnographic material for the museum by means of an extensive network of contacts. He was the author of Civilisation in the Old and the New World, and a number of other books, for example, a study on Thomas Chatterton, and Caliban, the Missing Link.

In 1857, Wilson made the original design for the coat of arms of the University of Toronto, which is used on the university's primary emblem to this day.

He was elected a member of the American Antiquarian Society in 1861.

In 1875 he was elected a Fellow of the Royal Society of Edinburgh. His proposers were Sir George Frederick Harvey, John Hutton Balfour, Sir Andrew Douglas Maclagan and Sir Robert Christison. He served as president of the Canadian Institute (later the Royal Canadian Institute) from 1878-1881.

Daniel Wilson also served as president of University College, Toronto from 1880 to 1892, and as the first president of the federated University of Toronto from 1890–1892. He asserted their claims against the sectarian universities of the province which denounced the provincial university as godless, and against the private medical schools in Toronto. He advocated what he called "the maintenance of a national system of university education in opposition to sectarian or denominational colleges". He opposed the federation of colleges, particularly that of Victoria College, as a "Methodist plot".

In 1888 Wilson was knighted by Queen Victoria for his services to education in Canada, and in 1891 given the Freedom of the City of Edinburgh.

He died in Toronto on August 6, 1892.

== Family ==
His older brother was George Wilson FRSE (1818–1859).

In 1840, he married Margaret Mackay.

His sister Jessie Aitken Wilson married the biologist James Sime.

== Recognition ==
The Sir Daniel J. Wilson Residence at the University College in University of Toronto is named in his honour.

== Publications ==
- Memorials of Edinburgh in the olden time (1848) Volume 1; Volume 2.
- Oliver Cromwell and The Protectorate (1848)
- The Archaeology and Prehistoric Annals of Scotland (1851)
- Prehistoric Man, researches into the origin of civilisation in the old and the new world (1862) Volume 1; Volume 2
- William Nelson: A Memoir (1889)
- The Lost Atlantis and Other Ethnographic Studies (1892)

== Bibliography ==
- Halpenny, Francess G., ed. (1990). "Wilson, Sir Daniel". Dictionary of Canadian Biography. Vol. XII (1891–1900) (online ed.). University of Toronto Press.
- Grant, William Lawson (1911). "Wilson, Sir Daniel" . In Chisholm, Hugh (ed.). Encyclopædia Britannica. Vol. 28 (11th ed.). Cambridge University Press. p. 691.

Professional and academic associations
| Preceded by Thomas Sterry Hunt | President of the Royal Society of Canada; 1885–1886 | Succeeded by Thomas-Étienne Hamel |

Professional and academic associations
| Preceded by Sir William Edmond Logan | President of the Royal Canadian Institute | Succeeded by Sir John Henry Lefroy |
