= St. Clair Balfour =

Canadian businessman

St. Clair Balfour OC DSC

Chair of the University of Toronto Governing Council
- In office 1984–1988
- Preceded by: Jack A. Whitten
- Succeeded by: Joan R. Randall

Personal details
- Born: St. Clair Balfour III; April 30, 1910 Hamilton, Ontario, Canada
- Died: May 9, 2002 (aged 92) Toronto, Ontario, Canada
- Education: Trinity College, Toronto
- Known for: President and Chairman of Southam Inc.

St. Clair Balfour III OC DSC (April 30, 1910 – May 9, 2002) was a Canadian businessman.

== Biography ==
Born in Hamilton, Ontario, the son of St. Clair Balfour II and Ethel May Southam (the daughter of William Southam, the founder of Southam Newspapers), he attended Trinity College School in Port Hope, Ontario and he received a Bachelor of Arts degree from the University of Trinity College in 1931. In 1933, he married Helen Gifford Staunton (1908-2010). They had two children: Lisa Balfour Bowen and St. Clair Balfour IV and two grandchildren, Arabella Bowen and Staunton Bowen.

He then started working for The Hamilton Spectator, a Southam newspaper. He would remain at Southam until retiring as Chairman in 1985. During World War II, he served in the Royal Canadian Navy in the North Atlantic and was awarded a Distinguished Service Cross.

After the war, he returned to The Spectator becoming its publisher in 1951. In 1954, he was appointed executive vice-president and managing director of the Southam company. He became president in 1961. In 1975, he was appointed Chairman. From 1984 to 1988, he served as chair of the University of Toronto Governing Council.

In 1988, he was made an Officer of the Order of Canada in recognition of being one of the "most highly respected newspaper publishers in Canada".

He died in Toronto of lung cancer in 2002.

== External sources ==
- "St. Clair Balfour obituary".
- Allison Dunfield (May 15, 2002). "St. Clair Balfour: Newspaperman led Southam chain". The Globe and Mail. p. R7.
