= Rose Patten =

Rose Patten OC

34th Chancellor of the University of Toronto
- In office July 1, 2018 – July 1, 2024
- President: Meric Gertler
- Preceded by: Michael Wilson
- Succeeded by: Wes Hall

Personal details
- Born: Rose M. Patten St. John's, Newfoundland and Labrador
- Occupation: Businessperson, philanthropist

Rose M. Patten, OC OOnt is a Canadian businessperson and philanthropist. She served as chair of the University of Toronto Governing Council from 2004 to 2007, and the 34th chancellor of the University of Toronto from 2018 to 2024. Born in St. John's, Newfoundland and Labrador, she is a Special Advisor to the CEO of BMO Financial Group.

== Awards ==
In 2012, she was awarded the Queen Elizabeth II Diamond Jubilee Medal. In 2017, she was made an Officer of the Order of Canada in recognition for having "served her community with dedication and inspiration". She was made a Member of the Order of Ontario in the class of 2021.

Academic offices
Preceded by Michael Wilson	Chancellor of the University of Toronto; 2018–2024	Succeeded by Wes Hall
