= Pekka K. Sinervo =

Experimental particle physicist

16th Dean of the University of Toronto Faculty of Arts and Science
- In office 2003 – 2008
- Preceded by: Carl Amrhein
- Succeeded by: Meric Gertler

Personal details
- Born: 24 May 1958 (age 68) Helsinki, Finland
- Education: Ph.D. Stanford University
- Scientific career
- Fields: Particle physics
- Workplaces: University of Toronto, University of Pennsylvania, Canadian Institute for Advanced Research

Pekka K. Sinervo (born 24 May 1958) is a Finnish-Canadian is an experimental particle physicist and professor of physics at the University of Toronto. His research has focused on high-energy particle collisions, heavy quarks, detector systems, high-performance computing and searches for new particles. using high-energy electron and proton collisions. He was a member of the Collider Detector at Fermilab (CDF) collaboration and had a leading role in the research that established the existence of the top quark in 1995. He later became a member of the ATLAS collaboration at CERN's Large Hadron Collider (LHC), where his research has included the discovery of the Higgs boson, measurements of top-quark properties and studies of the Higgs boson.

== Early life and education ==
Sinervo was born in Helsinki, Finland, in 1958 and moved with his family to Canada as a young child. He was raised in Port Arthur, Ontario, now part of Thunder Bay, in a Finnish-Canadian community.

He studied mathematics and physics at the University of Toronto, receiving a four-year B.Sc. in 1980. He then attended Stanford University, where he completed a Ph.D. in elementary particle physics in 1986. His doctoral dissertation concerned the spectroscopy of strange mesons.

== Career ==
=== Early career ===
Sinervo joined University of Toronto in 1990 and has held several academic leadership positions there, including chair of the Department of Physics and dean of the Faculty of Arts and Science. He served as senior vice-president of research at the Canadian Institute for Advanced Research from 2009 to 2015 and has held leadership and advisory positions involving national and international research facilities.

=== Academic career ===
After completing his doctorate, Sinervo was a postdoctoral researcher at the University of Pennsylvania from 1986 to 1988 and then joined its faculty as an assistant professor from 1988 to 1990. He joined the University of Toronto as an associate professor in 1990 and was promoted to professor in 1995.

Sinervo has spent most of his academic career at the University of Toronto. He became chair of the Department of Physics in 1997 and subsequently held several positions in the Faculty of Arts and Science, including vice-dean for graduate education and research, vice-dean academic, and vice-provost for first-entry programs. He served as dean of the Faculty of Arts and Science from 2003 to 2008.

Sinervo served as the 16th dean of the Faculty of Arts and Science at the University of Toronto from 2003 to 2008, and as senior vice-president, research at the Canadian Institute for Advanced Research from 2009 to 2015. He has written on international research collaborations, science and Judaism, and popular science (see, e.g.,).

He is a member of the Reform Jewish Community of Canada, serving as its president from 2017 to 2021, and has served in leadership roles in the Union for Reform Judaism and the World Union for Progressive Judaism.

=== Top-quark, Higgs boson and dark matter research ===
Sinervo's early research at the University of Toronto focused on experimental studies of high-energy particle collisions. From 1986 onward he was involved with the Collider Detector at Fermilab (CDF) experiment at the Tevatron, which studied proton–antiproton collisions. His research included searches for the top quark, a particle predicted by the Standard Model but not yet observed at the time.

Sinervo's Canadian research group was part of the international CDF collaboration that contributed to the evidence leading to the discovery of the top quark. In March 1995, Fermilab announced that the CDF and DZero collaborations had independently observed top-quark production. The discovery established the existence of the sixth quark predicted by the Standard Model.

Sinervo subsequently continued to study the properties of the top quark, including its mass, production cross section and transverse-momentum distribution. He also investigated the use of top-quark events in searches for particles beyond the Standard Model.

In addition to his work at the Fermilab Tevatron and LHC, Sinervo has participated in experimental searches for dark matter at SNOLAB in Sudbury, Ontario. He is a member of the SuperCDMS collaboration, which uses cryogenic detectors to search for weakly interacting dark matter particles.
