= Convocation Hall =

Domed rotunda at the University of Toronto St. George

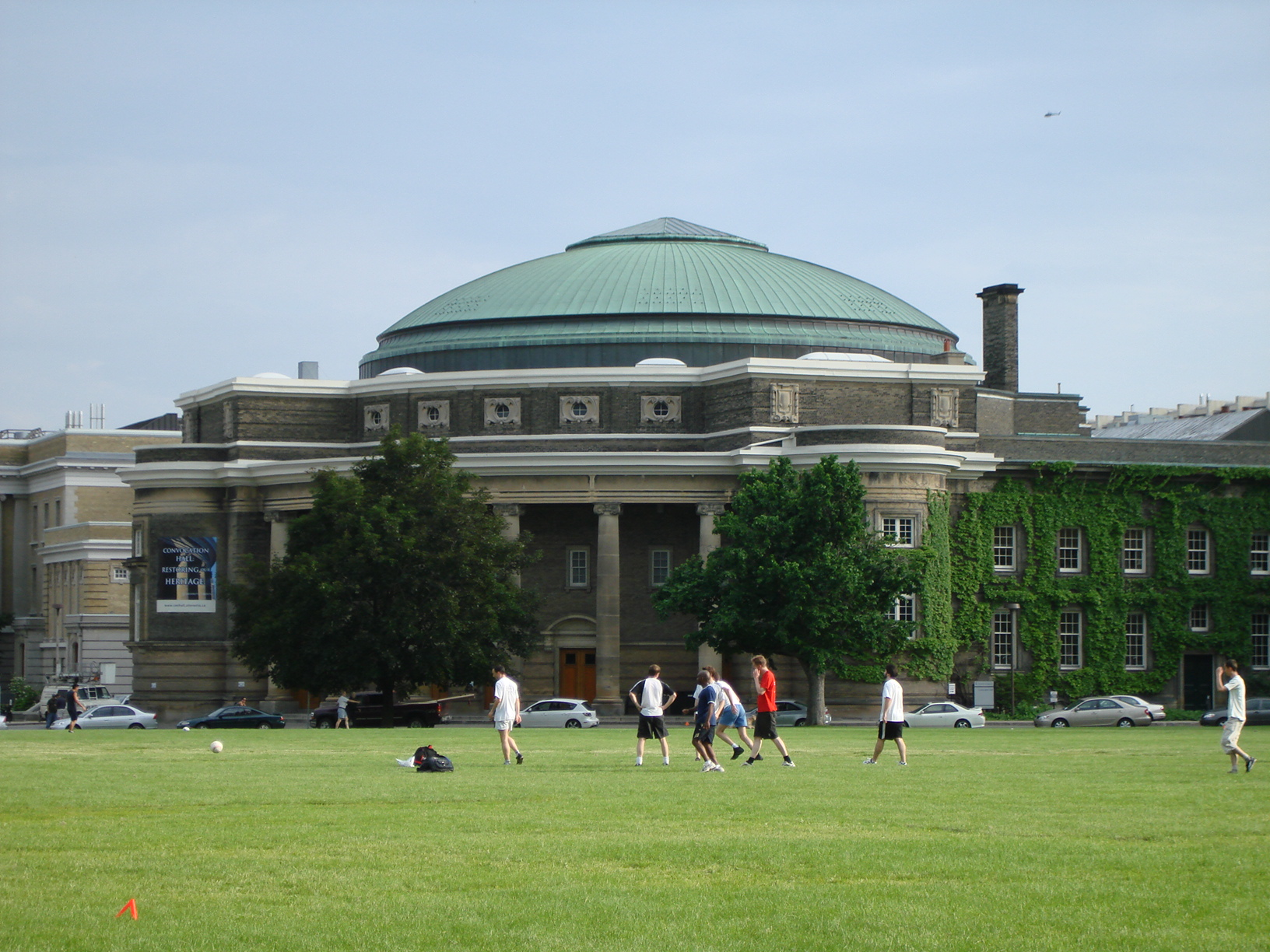
- Convocation Hall and Front Campus (foreground)
- Interactive map of Convocation Hall
- Address: 31 King's College Circle; Toronto, Ontario; Canada
- Location: University of Toronto St. George
- Coordinates: 43°39′39″N 79°23′43″W
- Owner: University of Toronto
- Seating type: Reserved seating
- Capacity: 1,730
- Public transit: at Queen's Park; 506

Construction
- Built: 1904-1907
- Opened: 1907
- Renovated: 2006
- Expanded: 1947
- Cost: $200,000
- Architect: Darling and Pearson

Website
- lsm.utoronto.ca/conhall/index.html

Ontario Heritage Act
- Criteria: Listed
- Designated: 1973

Convocation Hall is a domed rotunda on the St. George campus of the University of Toronto in Toronto, Ontario, Canada. Designed by Darling and Pearson and completed in 1907, its radially planned interior has been compared to the grand amphitheatre of the Sorbonne and the Sheldonian Theatre at Oxford, although no specific precedent is truly known. It is conjoined with Simcoe Hall. While the building's namesake purpose is to host the annual convocation ceremonies, it also serves as the venue for academic and social functions that involve large audiences throughout the year. All convocation ceremonies from across the university's three campuses are held in the venue.

== History ==
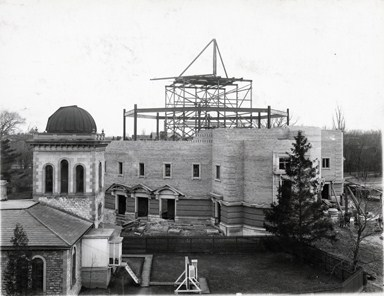
Convocation Hall under construction, 1906

In the latter half of the 19th century, the university began to see the need for a considerably larger ceremonial auditorium beyond the confines of University College, made more apparent by a fire that damaged much of the college in 1890. The construction of Convocation Hall was mainly financed by $50,000 raised by the University of Toronto Alumni Association and matching funds provided by Ontario government. The cornerstone was laid in 1904 and the construction completed three years later at almost twice the originally estimated cost.

Major additions and expansions to the building occurred in 1912 when a large pipe organ was installed in the auditorium, and in 1947 with an alteration and addition to the examination hall. The building would not become equipped with air conditioning until 1997. Simcoe Hall, the University of Toronto's main administrative building, was conjoined with Convocation Hall during its construction in 1924. In 2006, a major restoration and refurbishment was undertaken by E.R.A Architects with funding from the alumni association. Work entailed refurbishing seats, restoration of grandeur of the circular foyer including decorative finishes, historical millwork, lighting installations, installing accessible washrooms and a fresh coat of paint, and restoration of the historic pipe organ—the fifth largest in Toronto. The next year, Convocation Hall celebrated its centennial.

Over the years, Convocation Hall has served as the venue for major events and performances. Songs on Premiata Forneria Marconi's album Live in USA were recorded at the hall in 1974. Bob Marley & The Wailers performed two shows of the Rastaman Vibration Tour there in 1976. Other popular musical performances during the 1960s and 1970s included appearances by Frank Zappa, Van Morrison, Mahavishnu Orchestra and Captain Beefheart. Zimbabwean President Robert Mugabe gave an address to a capacity crowd there in the 1980s. The building hosted a recording of musician Hayden's live album, titled simply Live at Convocation Hall, in 2002. In 2007, former Vice President of the United States Al Gore delivered a public lecture on climate change at Convocation Hall and presented his documentary film, An Inconvenient Truth. In 2009, Michael Ignatieff was at the hall to launch his book, True Patriot Love. The building also appeared in the film Mean Girls, the television series Orphan Black, and in the pilot episode of the TV series Fringe.

== Architecture ==
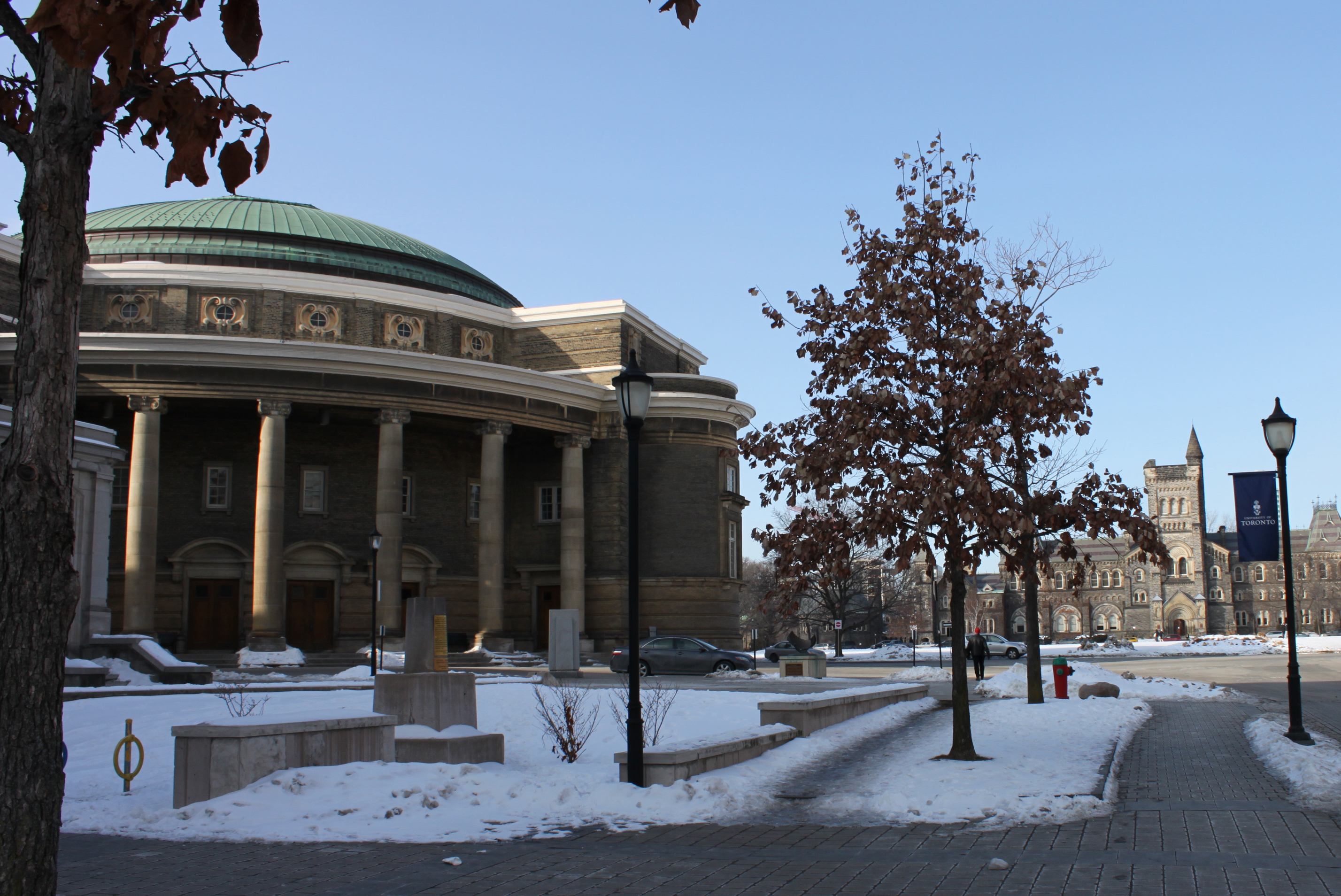
Convocation Hall facing north

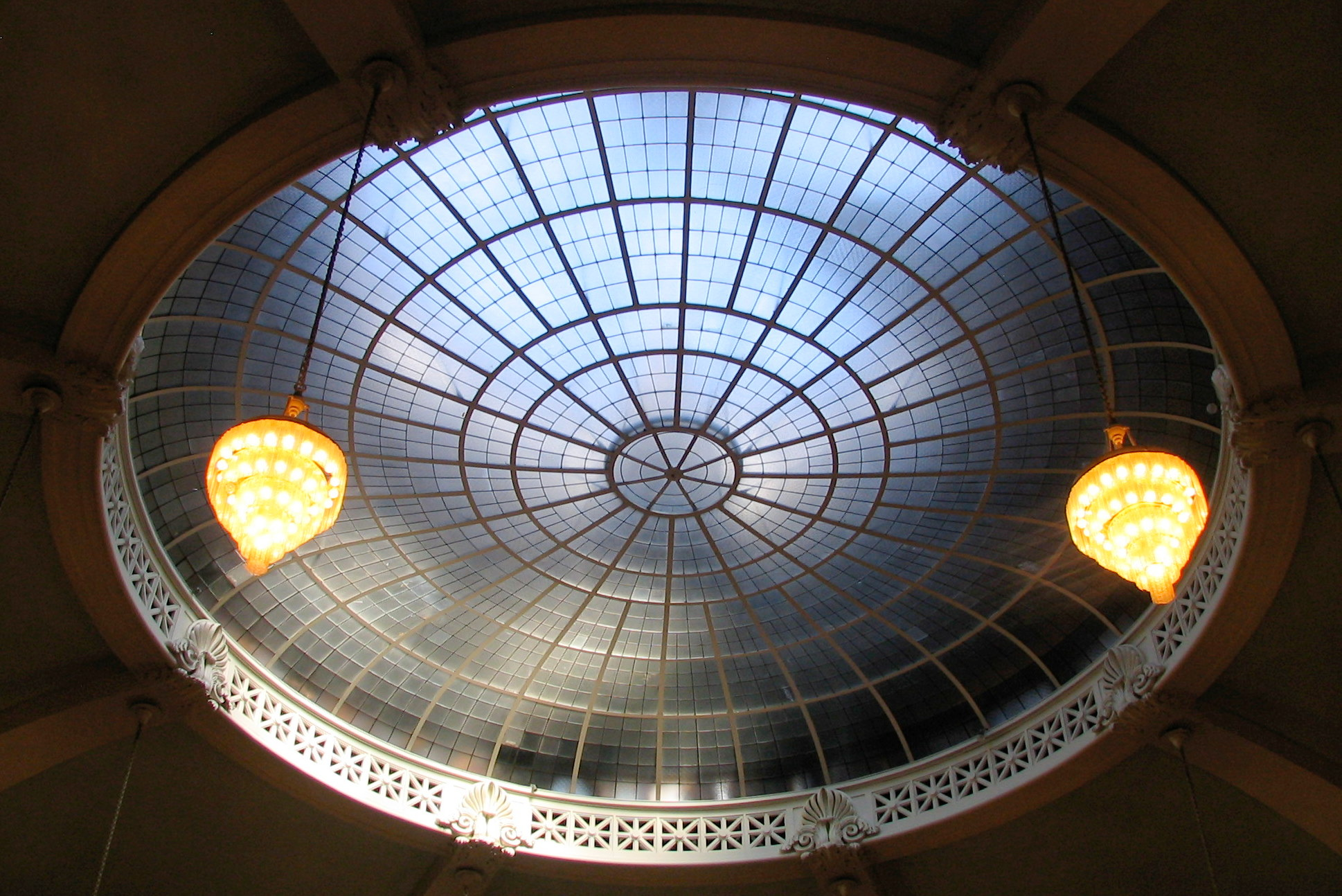
The oculus at the top of the hall's dome

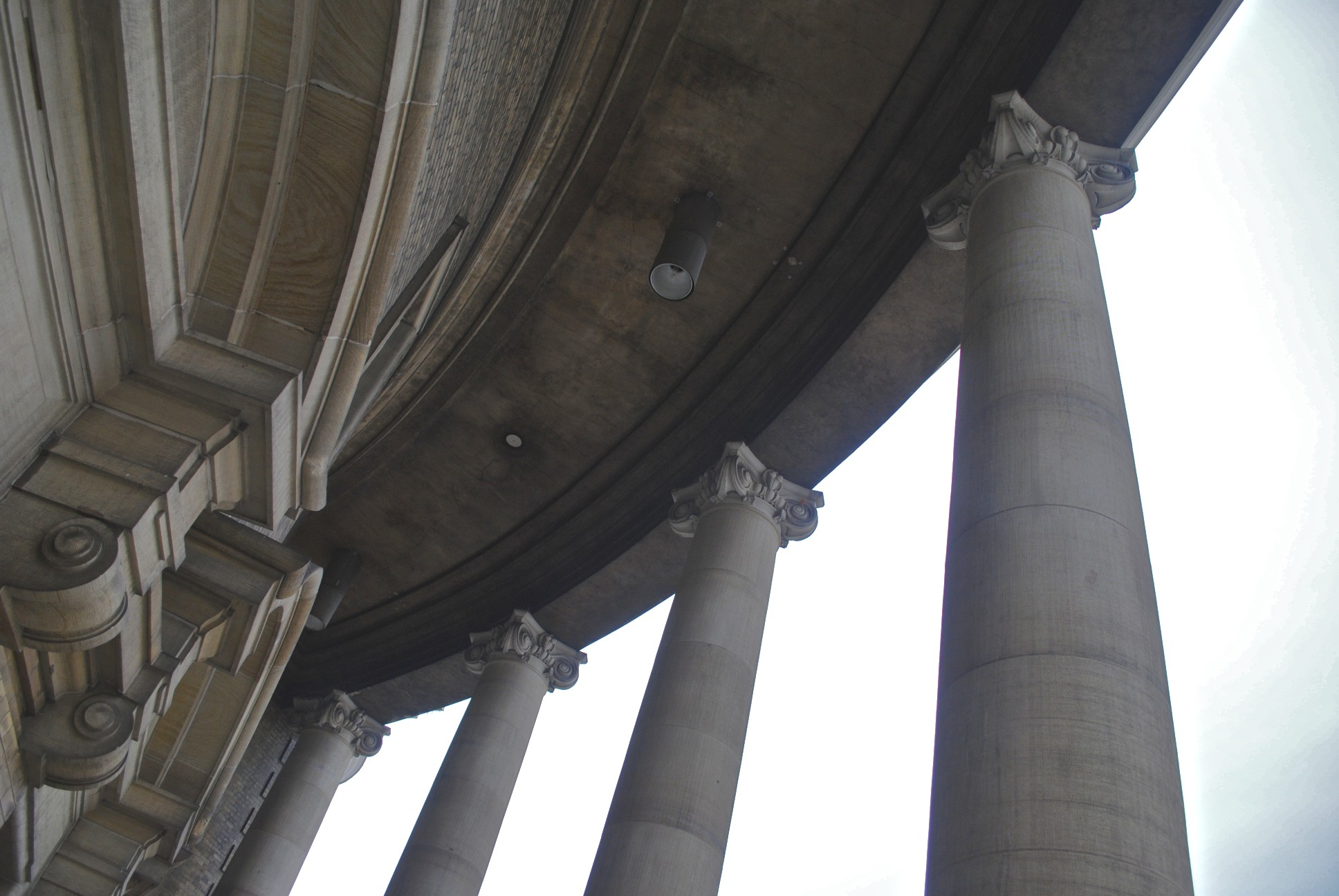
Perspective view of columns

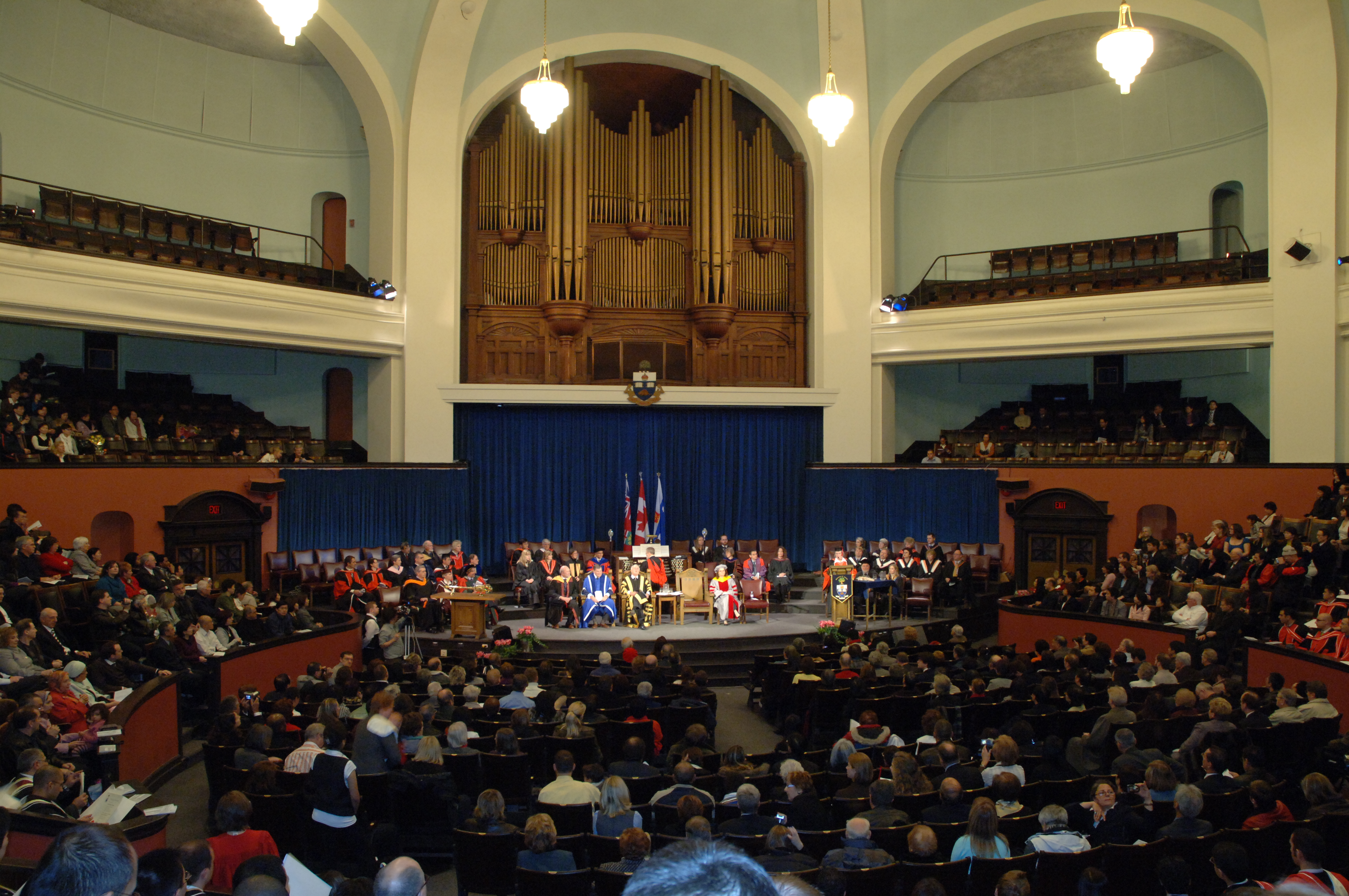
Inside the auditorium during convocation

Convocation Hall is an important University landmark, designed by one of Toronto's most prominent and prolific firms. Architect Frank Darling of Darling and Pearson was influenced by the Sorbonne theatre in Paris and Edwardian Baroque revival in architecture. There is an emphasis on principles of proportion, symmetry, geometry and uniformity of parts while accepting a freer use of classical forms common to the period. The Hall's radial design enhances its graduation assembly experience and for some conveys messages of centrality and inclusiveness. The purpose of the radial form was to make Convocation Hall both the metaphorical and physical centre of the expanding University and to anchor a newly rationalized campus layout.

Convocation Hall's circular mass is emphasized by its shallow copper-clad dome and its curved entablature, supported by two-storey unfluted Ionic order porticos. A large glass oculus allows natural lighting into the centre of the large hall beneath. Supporting the dome are arched structural ribs which are connected by smaller arched bays between the balcony seating on the third floor of the Hall. Main exterior materials are two tones of buff brick, limestone and copper.

With a seating capacity of 1731, Convocation Hall comprises four storeys, including two main seating floors. Attached in the rear of Convocation Hall are an examination hall that formerly served as exhibition space, and Simcoe Hall (also designed by Darling), which houses the university's executive offices. Because of the auditorium's curved shape, there are five different sizes of seats used throughout which were made mostly from locally sourced maple wood, with cushions that were originally stuffed with horse hair. Each of the original seats has a unique wire rack underneath which were used to store attendee's top hats. On stage during convocation, two special chairs used by the chancellor and president of the University are made of timber from the wrecked USS Scorpion, an American schooner captured by the British on Lake Huron in 1814.

== See also ==
- List of University of Toronto buildings
- List of oldest buildings and structures in Toronto
- Academic dress of the University of Toronto
- University of Toronto Faculty of Music
