= David Naylor =

Canadian physician and academic (born 1954)

David Naylor OC FRCPC FRSC
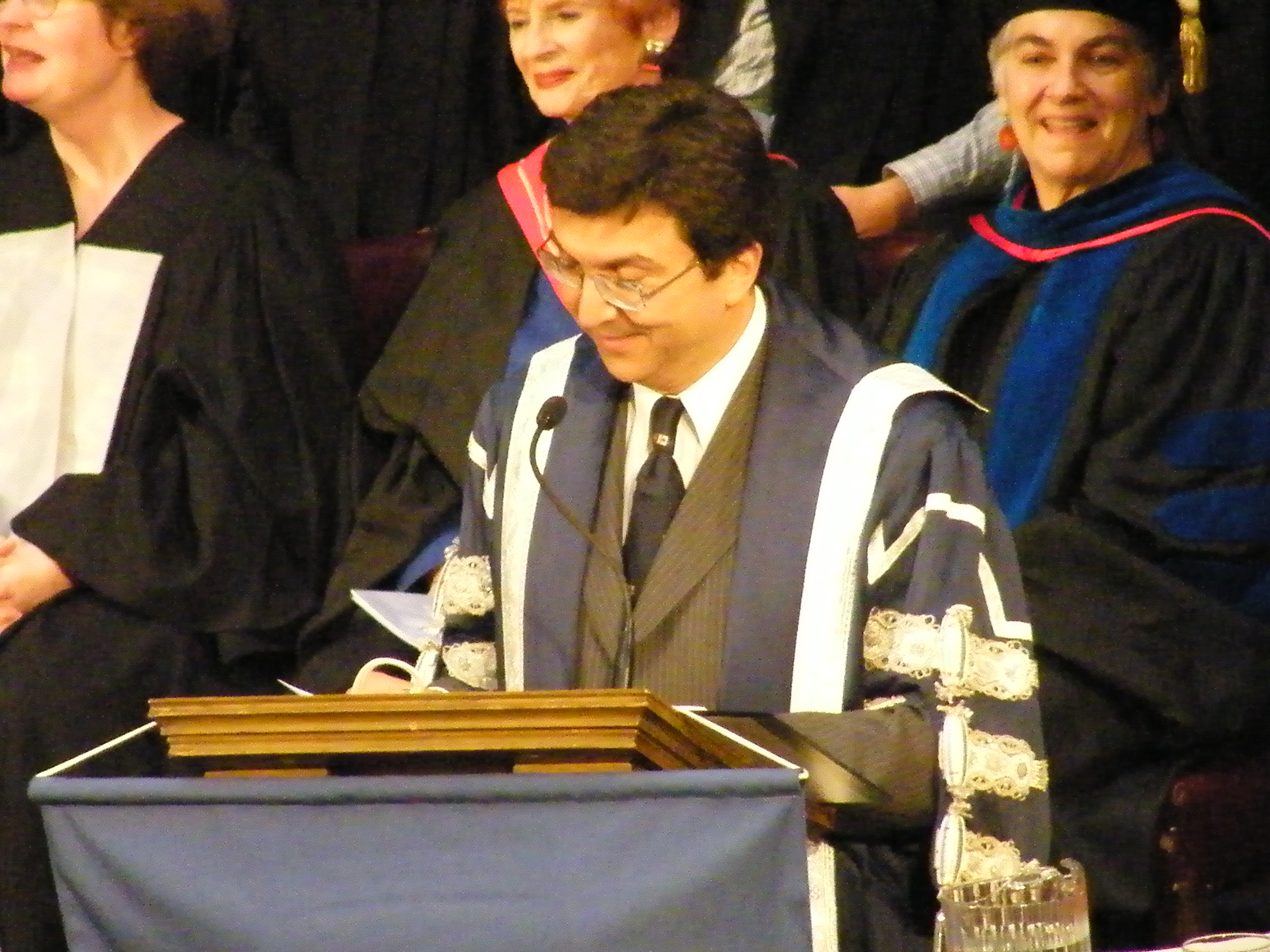
- Naylor during a degree ceremony in 2009

15th President of the University of Toronto
- In office October 1, 2005 – October 2013
- Chancellor: Vivienne Poy; David Peterson; Michael Wilson
- Preceded by: Vivek Goel (acting)
- Succeeded by: Meric Gertler

Dean of the University of Toronto Faculty of Medicine
- In office 1999–2005
- Preceded by: Arnold Aberman
- Succeeded by: Catharine Whiteside

Personal details
- Born: Christopher David Naylor; October 26, 1954 (age 71) Woodstock, Ontario, Canada
- Education: University of Toronto (MD); Hertford College, Oxford (DPhil)
- Profession: Professor
- Awards: 2018 Henry G. Friesen International Prize in Health Research

Academic work
- Discipline: Medicine
- Sub-discipline: Public Health
- Institutions: University of Toronto
- Main interests: Canadian health care

Christopher David Naylor (born October 26, 1954) is a Canadian physician and medical researcher who served as the 15th president of the University of Toronto from 2005 to 2013. He is ICES scientist emeritus and founding CEO. In 2016, he was inducted into the Canadian Medical Hall of Fame.

== Life and career ==
Naylor was born in Woodstock, Ontario. A Rhodes Scholar, Naylor enrolled at the University of Toronto and spent two years at University College before entering the Faculty of Medicine, where he received an MD in 1978. He proceeded to Hertford College, Oxford, where he earned a D.Phil in 1983 in the Department of Social and Administrative Studies. His doctoral thesis was titled "The Canadian medical profession and state medical care insurance: Key developments, 1911-1966".

He completed work in internal medicine and clinical epidemiology at the University of Western Ontario and Toronto and joined the academic staff of the Faculty of Medicine at the University of Toronto in 1987 where his clinical base was at Sunnybrook Health Sciences Centre.

Naylor developed the proposal for the Institute for Clinical Evaluative Sciences in 1991 and served as the Institute's President and Chief Executive Officer from its inception in 1992 until June 1998.

Naylor was appointed Dean of Medicine and Vice Provost, Relations with Health Care Institutions of the University of Toronto in 1999. While in this position, he was named Chair of the National Advisory Committee on SARS and Public Health, 2003, following the outbreak of SARS in Ontario.

The appointment of Naylor as president of the University of Toronto was announced on 26 April 2005. He replaced acting president Vivek Goel who in turn had replaced interim president Frank Iacobucci, who himself took over after the departure of Robert Birgeneau. Naylor officially took office on October 1, 2005.

In 2006 it was announced that Naylor had been appointed an Officer of the Order of Canada. He was appointed on April 6, 2006, and his investiture took place on February 9, 2007.

On June 24, 2014, Naylor was appointed by Rona Ambrose, Minister of Health, as Chair of the Advisory Panel on Healthcare Innovation. The Panel's report, Unleashing Innovation: Excellence for Healthcare in Canada was delivered in July 2015.

In June 2016, Dr. Naylor was appointed the chair of The Advisory panel for the report INVESTING IN CANADA’S FUTURE: Strengthening the Foundations of Canadian Research by the federal Minister of Science, Dr. Kirsty Duncan. The 280 page "Naylor Report" was delivered in April 2017, and finally acted upon in the Canadian government's budget of February 27, 2018.

== Legacy ==
In 2015, the erstwhile Tanz Building at the University of Toronto was renamed the C. David Naylor Building.
