= Bill Wilkerson (business executive) =

Canadian business executive and mental health advocate

- Born: William E. Wilkerson; 10 March 1942; Niagara Falls, Ontario, Canada
- Died: 26 January 2025 (aged 82); Port Hope, Ontario
- Occupations: Business executive; mental health advocate; journalist
- Years active: c. 1960s–c. 2000s
- Known for: Mental health advocacy in Canada, U.S., Europe, Middle East, and beyond
- Board member of: Kaiser Foundation
- Spouse: Olga Cwiek (m. 1998)
- Awards: LL.D. (Hon) (McMaster University)

William E. Wilkerson (1942-2025) was a Canadian business executive, mental health advocate, author, and co-founder of the Global Business and Economic Roundtable on Addiction and Mental Health. He was a prominent advocate for mental health issues impacting Canadian employees.

Wilkerson's career began in journalism and public affairs before he moved to executive roles and then into mental health advocacy. In 1998, he co-founded the Global Business and Economic Roundtable on Addiction and Mental Health with business executive Tim Price and former Canadian Finance Minister Michael Wilson. Wilkerson and Wilson were also appointed by the Canadian Minister of Health to review mental health in the workplace. Wilkerson spoke widely about workplace mental health, suicide prevention, and frameworks for mental health policy. He was also an industry professor of international mental health at McMaster University and a member of the Ontario Ministry of Health Task Force on Mental Health Reform.

== Early life ==
Wilkerson was born on 10 March 1942 in Niagara Falls, Ontario. He was the son of Bernice and James Wilkerson. He attended St Patrick's Elementary School and the Niagara Falls Collegiate and Vocational Institute. Wilkerson was expelled from high school in his senior year; he didn't return and didn't attend university.

== Career ==
=== Early career ===
In 1962, Wilkerson began his career as a court reporter for the Welland Evening Tribune, and joined the Niagara Falls Evening Review in late 1964. In June 1967, he became an aide for the Secretary of State for Canada, Judy LaMarsh. In 1968, he became the executive assistant to Joe Greene, Canada's Minister of Energy, Mines, and Resources.

He began working in communications at International Telephone and Telegraph (ITT) c. 1971, and was vice-president of communications and advertising in 1977. This was followed by turns at the Canadian Broadcasting Company (CBC) as director of communications and public affairs, at the Royal Bank of Canada as communications director, and as Chief of Staff to Art Eggleton, the Mayor of Toronto from 1982 to 1986.

Wilkerson was also an adjunct professor of journalism at the University of Western Ontario Graduate School of Journalism in the 1980s. He often worked as a crisis specialist and co-founded CorpWorld Communications Group. In 1995, he became the president of Liberty Health. He served as CEO of the Toronto Symphony Orchestra and executive director of Roy Thomson Hall, senior counsel to the public affairs and communications firm, GPC International, and advisor to the National Hockey League's board of directors, the Toronto Blue Jays, and the Canadian Football League.

=== Mental health work ===
In 1998, Wilkerson co-founded the Global Business and Economic Roundtable on Addiction and Mental Health with business executive Tim Price and initial support from former Canadian Finance Minister Michael Wilson. The organization focused on promoting employer engagement in mental health and addiction in the workplace and is credited with popularizing the term "workplace mental health". The Roundtable convened business leaders, researchers, clinicians, and policymakers to examine the economic and organizational impacts of mental illness. It advocated for change, produced guidance and employer-focused tools, and contributed to the development of workplace mental health policies and practices in Canada. Wilkerson and Wilson were also appointed by the Canadian Minister of Health to review mental health in the workplace.

Between 2008 and 2011, Wilkerson served as a sworn civilian mental‑health adviser to the Royal Canadian Mounted Police. He contributed to the development of national psychological health guidelines for police organizations, including the “COPS” framework (Care, Outreach, Prevention, Support).

After closing the Roundtable in 2011, Wilkerson co-founded Mental Health International (MHI) with Joseph Ricciuti. He later chaired MHI's initiative European Business Leadership Forum for Mental Health and Productivity (2013-2015). For its campaign to "Target the Impact of Depression" in the Workplace, he travelled to twenty European capitals to recruit multinational employers, such as the European Central Bank and Royal Mail. He was also vice chair of the Kaiser Foundation.

Wilkerson spoke widely about workplace mental health, suicide prevention, and frameworks for mental health policy. He delivered talks to business and scientific organizations, as well as also to caregivers, teachers, police, military, and first responders across Canada, the United States, Europe, and the Middle East. He was also a member of the Ontario Ministry of Health Task Force on Mental Health Reform.

== Awards and honours ==
Wilkerson was awarded an honorary Doctor of Laws by McMaster University in 2015.

== Personal life ==
While working for CBC in Vancouver, Wilkerson met Olga Cwiek, and they married in c. 1998. They lived in Ottawa, Montreal, and Toronto before moving to Port Hope. Wilkerson died suddenly on January 26, 2025 in his home. Memorial services were held in Toronto at the Royal Canadian Military Institute, and in Port Hope.

== Selected published works ==
- Wilkerson, Bill (August 6, 1996). "What to do about Disability: Another Perspective". The Globe and Mail, Toronto. p. B2 – via Newspapers.com.
- Pérez, Edgardo; Wilkerson, Bill (1998). Mindsets: Mental Health, the Ultimate Productivity Weapon : a Report and Commentary. Homewood Centre for Organizational Health at Riverslea. ASIN B01B99GFCC.
- deVries, Marten W.; Wilkerson, Bill (February 2003). "Stress, work and mental health: a global perspective". Acta Neuropsychiatrica. 15 (1): 44–53. doi:10.1034/j.1601-5215.2003.00017.x. ISSN 0924-2708.
- Wilkerson B. (2006). "Global business and economic roundtable on addiction and mental health. An agenda for progress global business and economic roundtable on mental health" (PDF). mentalhealthroundtable.ca.
- Wilkerson, B. (2006). "Business and economic plan for mental health and productivity". mentalhealthroundtable.ca.
- Wilkerson, Bill (August 12, 2008). "Mental Health and Productivity in the 21st Century: Keynote Address". International Foundation of Employee Benefits and the 41st Annual Canadian Employee Benefits Conference. Halifax, Nova Scotia – via yumpu.com.
- Wilkerson, Bill (2010). "Principles of mental health Charting a new course for the RCMP" (PDF). RCMP Gazette. 72 (1): 14–15.
- Wilkerson, Bill; Wilson, The Honourable Michael (December 2011). Brain Health + Brain Skills = Brain Capital. Global Business and Economic Roundtable on Addiction and Mental Health.
- Wilkerson, Bill; Baynton, Mary Ann (January 1, 2016). "Stigma reduction plan". Workplace Strategies for Mental Health. Archived from the original on December 10, 2025.
- Wilkerson, Bill; posthumously (March 16, 2025). Fluke: Volume 1 of Life's Adventures. Blurb. ISBN 9-798-31753-013-6.
- Wilkerson, Bill; Ricciuti, Joseph; Wilson, Michael. Breaking Through: Brain Health in a Brain Economy.
