= James Loudon =

Canadian physicist (1841–1916)

James Loudon FRSC
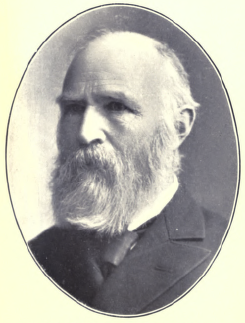

4th President of the University of Toronto
- In office 1901–1906
- Chancellor: William Ralph Meredith
- Preceded by: Position re-established
- Succeeded by: Maurice Hutton (acting)

3rd President of University College, Toronto
- In office 1892–1901
- Chancellor: Edward Blake; William Ralph Meredith
- Preceded by: Daniel Wilson
- Succeeded by: Maurice Hutton

Personal details
- Born: May 24, 1841 Toronto, Canada West
- Died: December 29, 1916 (aged 75) Toronto, Ontario, Canada

James Loudon FRSC (May 24, 1841 – December 29, 1916) was a Canadian professor of mathematics and physics and the fourth president of the University of Toronto from 1892 to 1906, a role concurrent with presidency of University College until 1901. He was the first Canadian-born professor at the University of Toronto.

== Biography ==
Loudon was educated at the Toronto Grammar School, Upper Canada College, and the University of Toronto, where he received a B.A. in 1862 and an M.A. in 1864. Initially a tutor in classics, he soon moved to mathematics, eventually becoming the professor of mathematics and physics at University College in 1875, succeeding his teacher John Bradford Cherriman. In 1887 he became professor of physics only, and became president of the university in 1892.

He visited the United Kingdom to attend the 450th jubilee of the University of Glasgow in June 1901, and received an honorary doctorate (LL.D) from the university.

Professional and academic associations
Preceded by Louis-Honoré Fréchette	President of the Royal Society of Canada; 1901–1902	Succeeded by James A. Grant
