= Michael Wilson (Canadian politician) =

Canadian politician (1937–2019)

The Honourable Michael Wilson PC CC

33rd Chancellor of the University of Toronto
- In office July 1, 2012 – June 30, 2018
- President: David Naylor; Meric Gertler
- Preceded by: David Peterson
- Succeeded by: Rose Patten

Canadian Ambassador to the United States
- In office March 13, 2006 – October 19, 2009
- Prime Minister: Stephen Harper
- Preceded by: Frank McKenna
- Succeeded by: Gary Doer

Minister of Industry, Science and Technology
- In office April 21, 1991 – June 25, 1993
- Prime Minister: Brian Mulroney
- Preceded by: Benoît Bouchard
- Succeeded by: Jean Charest

Minister of International Trade
- In office April 21, 1991 – June 24, 1993
- Prime Minister: Brian Mulroney
- Preceded by: John Crosbie
- Succeeded by: Tom Hockin

Minister of Finance
- In office September 17, 1984 – April 20, 1991
- Prime Minister: Brian Mulroney
- Preceded by: Marc Lalonde
- Succeeded by: Don Mazankowski

Member of Parliament for Etobicoke Centre
- In office May 22, 1979 – October 25, 1993
- Preceded by: Riding created
- Succeeded by: Allan Rock

Personal details
- Born: November 4, 1937 Toronto, Ontario, Canada
- Died: 10 February 2019 (aged 81)
- Party: Progressive Conservative
- Spouse: Margaret Catherine Smellie (m. 1964)
- Education: Upper Canada College ('55); University of Toronto (BCom '59)

Michael Holcombe Wilson PC CC (November 4, 1937 – February 10, 2019) was a Canadian businessman, politician and diplomat who served as minister of finance from 1984 to 1991 and minister of international trade from 1991 to 1993 under Prime Minister Brian Mulroney.

Wilson was a Bay Street investment executive before he was elected to the House of Commons in 1979. He then unsuccessfully ran for the leadership of the Progressive Conservative Party in 1983 before being appointed to Prime Minister Mulroney's cabinet. As a cabinet minister, Wilson introduced the Goods and Services Tax (GST) and helped negotiate the Canada–United States Free Trade Agreement and the North American Free Trade Agreement.

Wilson retired from politics in 1993 and returned back to Bay Street, heading his own consulting and financial services firm. Wilson served as the Chairman of Barclays Capital Canada Inc. from May 2010 until his death in February 2019. He was the Canadian Ambassador to the United States from 2006 until 2009 and the Chancellor of the University of Toronto from 2012 to 2018.

== Early life ==
Michael Wilson was born in Toronto on November 4, 1937 to Harry Holcombe Wilson (1903–1988) and Constance Lloyd Davies (1907–1990). Harry Wilson spent his career with the National Trust Company, where he served from 1964 to 1967 as president and from 1967 to 1972 as vice-chairman. Constance had been married in 1927 to Rudolph Muspratt, the son of Sir Max Muspratt. However, Rudolph died in 1929, and the couple's twin infant sons died in 1930. Constance and Harry married in 1933 and had three children: Wendy, Michael, and Patricia. Michael Wilson attended Upper Canada College and then the University of Toronto, where he graduated with a degree in commerce in 1959. Wilson joined Harris and Partners Ltd., an investment firm, in 1961. He then worked at the Department of Finance from 1964 to 1966. After, he served as executive vice president of Dominion Securities from 1973 to 1979.

== Early political career ==
Wilson was elected as a Member of Parliament for the Progressive Conservative Party (PC Party) in the 1979 federal election. In that election, the PCs led by Joe Clark won a minority government. Wilson served as Clark's Minister of State for International Trade, though only for nine months as the PCs would suffer a defeat to the Liberal Party in the 1980 election.

Wilson was a candidate at the 1983 Progressive Conservative leadership convention. He dropped off after the first ballot and urged his supporters to vote for Brian Mulroney, the eventual winner.

== Cabinet minister (1984–1993) ==
=== Finance minister (1984–1991) ===
Mulroney, as prime minister, appointed Wilson as minister of finance when the party formed a majority government after the 1984 election.

==== Tax reform: Bill C-139 ====
Wilson introduced a major tax reform bill, Bill C-139, which was made effective on January 1, 1988. It included reforms for personal and corporate income taxes. The bill expanded the tax base for personal and corporate income; lowered rates applicable to taxable income; supplanted exemptions with credits; and removed certain deductions for personal income tax. The bill replaced the 1987 rate schedule of 10 brackets (with rates ranging from 6 to 34 percent) with a schedule of only three brackets (with rates of 17 percent, 26 percent, and 29 percent). The bill also limited the lifetime capital gains exemption to $100,000; lowered capital cost allowances; established limitations on deductible business expenses; and cut the dividend tax credit.

==== Goods and Services Tax ====
Wilson introduced the Goods and Services Tax (GST) in his 1989 budget. The tax replaced the hidden 13.5 percent manufacturers sales tax (MST), which Wilson argued damaged the Canadian economy's competitiveness as it only applied to domestically-manufactured goods, as opposed to the new GST which applied to both domestic and imported goods. The GST did not apply to basic groceries, prescription drugs, health and dental care, educational services, day care, and legal aid. Following public backlash, Wilson changed the tax's rate to seven percent, down from the original proposed rate of 9 percent. Although the government argued the tax was not a tax increase, but a tax shift, the highly visible nature of the tax was extremely unpopular, and many polls showed that as many as 80 percent of Canadians were opposed to the tax. Though the Senate with a Liberal majority refused to pass the GST, Mulroney used Section 26 (the Deadlock Clause), a little known Constitutional provision, which allowed him in an emergency situation to ask the Queen to appoint eight new Senators. On September 27, 1990, at the Queen's approval, Mulroney added the eight new Senators, and the GST was passed in the Senate in December and was made effective on January 1, 1991.

=== Minister of Industry and International Trade (1991–1993) ===
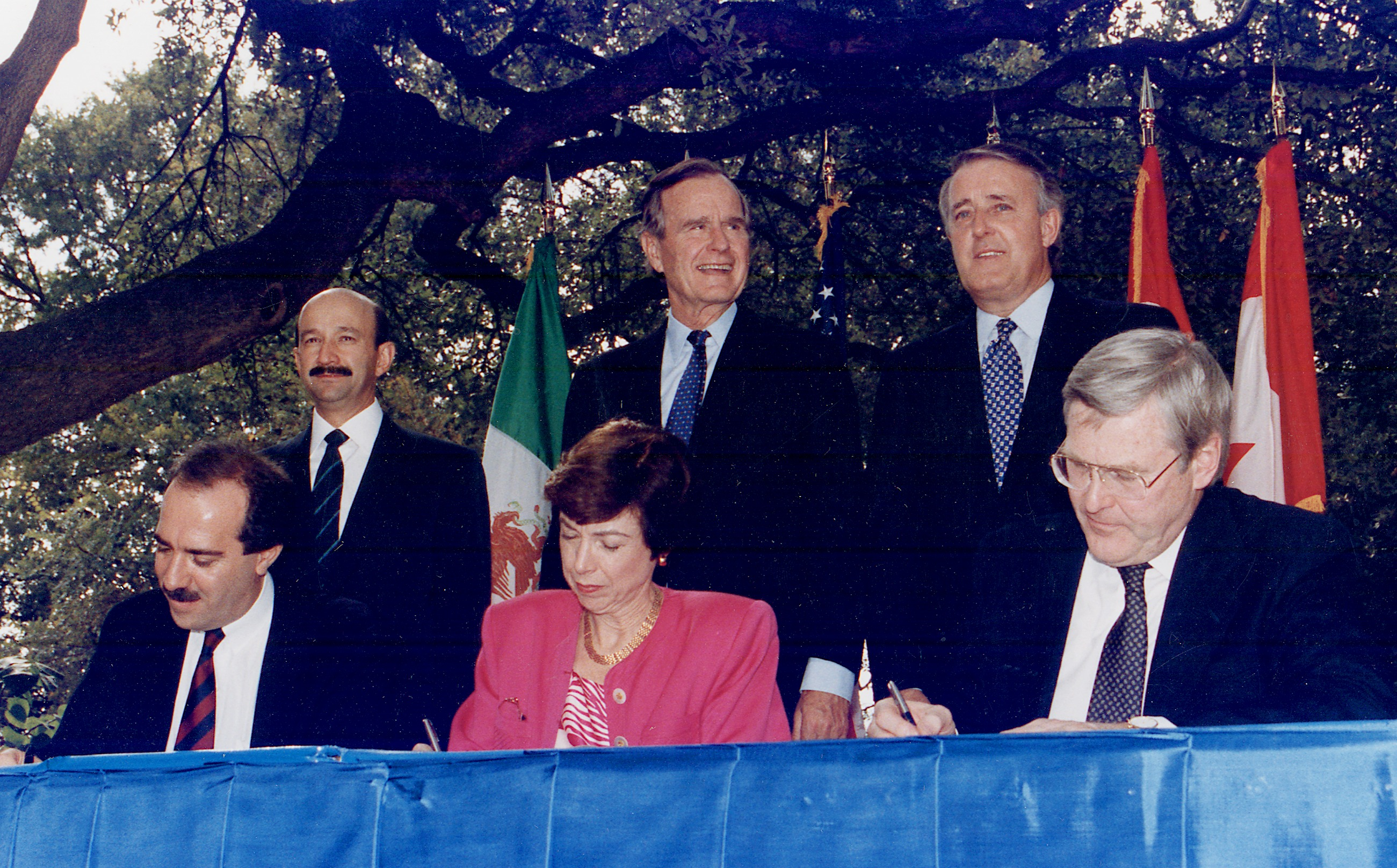
Wilson (bottom right) at the NAFTA Initialing Ceremony, October 1992

In 1991, after seven years as Minister of Finance, Wilson became Minister of Industry, Science and Technology and Minister of International Trade. In that role, he participated in negotiating the North American Free Trade Agreement.

== Post-politics ==
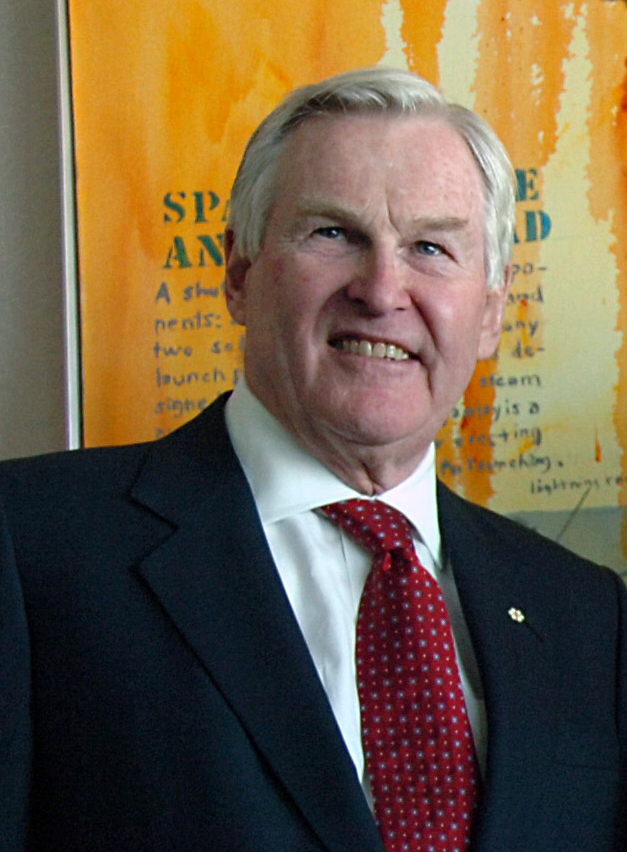
Wilson in 2009

Wilson was not a candidate in the 1993 election, and he returned to Bay Street to head his own consulting and financial services firm. He later rejoined Royal Bank of Canada, and he was Chairman and CEO of RT Capital when that business was sold to UBS AG. Wilson served as Chairman of UBS Canada from 2001 to 2006.

In recent years, he was a spokesman for a lobby group promoting public–private partnerships, and he was the Chairman of the Canadian Coalition for Good Governance. From 2003 to 2007, Wilson served as the Chancellor of Trinity College. In July 2012, he became the Chancellor of the University of Toronto, and he was re-elected to an additional three-year term in 2015.

Wilson was a mental health advocate, having lost a son to depression and suicide. In 1998, he founded the Global Business and Economic Roundtable on Addictions and Mental Health with Bill Wilkerson. Wilson established the Cameron Parker Holcombe Wilson Chair in Depression Studies at the University of Toronto. He also sat on the board of directors for the Mental Health Commission of Canada.

Wilson was active in many other organizations, including the NeuroScience Canada Partnership, the Centre for Addiction and Mental Health, the Canadian Cancer Society, the Canadian Council for Public-Private Partnerships, the Loran Scholars Foundation, the Canadian Coalition for Good Governance and the Canadian Institutes of Health Research.

On 30 October 2003, Wilson was appointed an Officer of the Order of Canada. He was promoted to Companion of the Order of Canada in 2010.

On 9 April 2015, it was announced that Wilson was appointed the new board chair of the Mental Health Commission of Canada. He was also a member of the Trilateral Commission.

Wilson died from cancer on February 10, 2019.

=== Ambassador to the United States ===
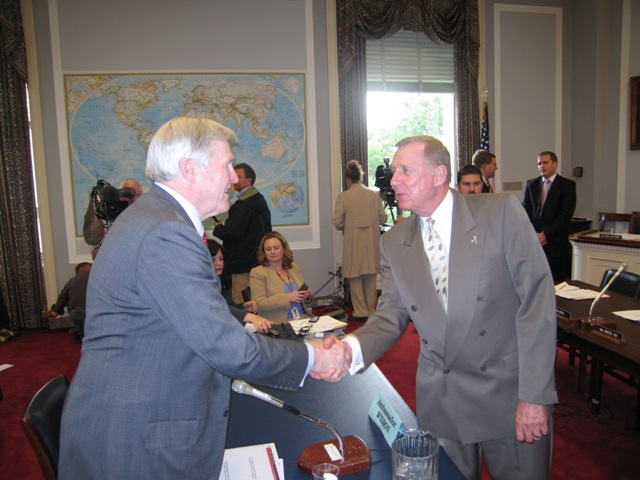
Wilson with United States Congressman Dan Burton in 2006

On 16 February 2006, Prime Minister Stephen Harper announced the nomination of Wilson as Ambassador of Canada to the United States of America. He succeeded Frank McKenna in Washington, D.C. Wilson became the 22nd Canadian Ambassador to the United States on 13 March 2006, when U.S. President George W. Bush accepted his credentials.

==== Allegation of leaks during 2008 Democratic presidential campaign ====
In March 2008, it was alleged that Wilson told the Canadian media that U.S. presidential candidate Barack Obama was not serious about his promise to opt out of the North American Free Trade Agreement (NAFTA). Liberal MP Navdeep Bains called on Wilson to step down as Canada's ambassador to Washington while the alleged leaks were investigated. Wilson publicly acknowledged that he spoke to then-CTV reporter Tom Clark, who first reported the leaks, before the story aired, but he refused to discuss what was said.

== Personal life ==
Wilson was married to Margie Wilson and was predeceased by son Cameron, who suffered from depression and died by suicide in 1995. Following his son's death, Wilson devoted considerable time to advocate for mental health. The couple had two other children: son Geoff Wilson and daughter Lara O'Brien, both of whom married and have children.

== Archives ==
There is a Michael Wilson fonds at Library and Archives Canada.

== Electoral record ==
1988 Canadian federal election: Etobicoke Centre
Party	Candidate	Votes	%	±%
Progressive Conservative	Michael Wilson	24,338	48.4	-8.4
Liberal	Mary Schwass	20,342	40.5	+10.6
New Democratic	Phil Jones	4,815	9.6	-3.2
Libertarian	Janice E. Hazlett	373	0.7	+0.2
Green	Isabel Van Humbeck	187	0.4	
Communist	Dan Goldstick	81	0.2	
Commonwealth of Canada	John J. Benz	70	0.1	
Independent	Jeanne Gatley	62	0.1	
Total valid votes		50,268	100.0	

1984 Canadian federal election: Etobicoke Centre
Party	Candidate	Votes	%	±%
Progressive Conservative	Michael Wilson	34,026	56.8	+9.7
Liberal	Jim Brown	17,853	29.8	-11.6
New Democratic	Phil Jones	7,657	12.8	+2.0
Libertarian	Shirley Yamada	339	0.6	0.0
Total valid votes		59,875	100.0	

1980 Canadian federal election: Etobicoke Centre
Party	Candidate	Votes	%	±%
Progressive Conservative	Michael Wilson	26,969	47.1	-4.2
Liberal	Joe Cruden	23,715	41.4	+3.7
New Democratic	Dan Shipley	6,181	10.8	+0.6
Libertarian	Norman R. Andersen	308	0.5	+0.1
Marxist–Leninist	Anne Boylan	88	0.2	+0.1
Total valid votes		57,261	100.0	
lop.parl.ca

1979 Canadian federal election: Etobicoke Centre
Party	Candidate	Votes	%
Progressive Conservative	Michael Wilson	31,498	51.3
Liberal	Alastair Gillespie	23,141	37.7
New Democratic	Dan Shipley	6,237	10.2
Libertarian	Norman R. Andersen	272	0.4
Communist	Nick Hrynchyshyn	112	0.2
Independent	Helen Obadia	54	0.1
Marxist–Leninist	James H. Reid	38	0.1
Total valid votes		61,352	100.0

Parliament of Canada
21st Canadian Ministry (1979–1980) – Cabinet of Joe Clark
Cabinet post (1)
Predecessor	Office	Successor
	Minister of State for International Trade; 1979–1980	
24th Canadian Ministry (1984–1993) – Cabinet of Brian Mulroney
Cabinet posts (3)
Predecessor	Office	Successor
John Crosbie	Minister for International Trade; 1991–1993	Tom Hockin
Benoît Bouchard	Minister of Industry, Science and Technology; 1991–1993	Jean Charest
Marc Lalonde	Minister of Finance; 1984–1991	Don Mazankowski
Academic offices
Preceded by John C. Bothwell	Chancellor of the University of Trinity College; 2003–2007	Succeeded by Bill Graham
Preceded by David Peterson	Chancellor of the University of Toronto; 2012–2018	Succeeded by Rose Patten
