= ICES =

Health research institute in Ontario, Canada

- Type: Not-for-profit corporation
- Industry: Health services research; Health research
- Founded: 1992
- Founder: David Naylor; Jack Williams
- Headquarters: Toronto, Ontario, Canada
- Key people: Michael Schull, President and CEO
- Products: Health information; Health informatics; Population health Reports; Scientific journal Papers
- Revenue: 7,830,535 Canadian dollar (2003)
- Total assets: 7,467,811 Canadian dollar (2003)
- Number of employees: 400+
- Website: http://www.ices.on.ca

ICES (formerly known as the Institute for Clinical Evaluative Sciences) is an independent, non-profit corporation that applies the study of health informatics for health services research and population-wide health outcomes research in Ontario, Canada, using data collected through the routine administration of Ontario's system of publicly funded health care.

ICES scientists have secure access to Ontario's health administrative data. ICES research teams produce peer-reviewed scientific journal articles, as well as reports and atlases to assist health care providers, government planners and policy makers in improving population health through the advancement of evidence-based practice and health policy.

ICES was established in 1992 and is governed by a board of directors. ICES receives core funding from the Ontario Ministry of Health and Long-Term Care (MOHLTC). In addition, ICES faculty and staff receive peer-reviewed grants from federal funding agencies such as the Canadian Institutes of Health Research, and project-specific funds from provincial and national organizations.

ICES' central location is on the campus of Sunnybrook Health Sciences Centre in Toronto, with satellite locations in Kingston, Ontario, London, Ontario, Hamilton, Ontario and Sudbury, Ontario.

== Research programs ==
ICES research is distributed across eight health areas:

1. Cancer
2. Cardiovascular
3. Chronic Disease and Pharmacotherapy
4. Kidney, Dialysis and Transplantation
5. Life Stage
6. Mental Health and Addictions
7. Populations and Public Health
8. Primary Care and Health Systems

== History ==
In the early 1990s, the Government of Ontario identified a growing need for evidence on health system performance in Ontario, in order to ensure the quality and efficiency of health services being provided. Dr. David Naylor and Dr. Jack Williams proposed to provincial health officials the creation of a new research institute that would securely analyse the administrative data routinely collected by the government through the Ontario Health Insurance Plan (OHIP), in order to produce population-based evidence.

ICES was launched in April 1992, with Naylor as the founding chief executive officer.

== Privacy and security ==
ICES is designated as a "prescribed entity" in Ontario under the Personal Health Information Protection Act (PHIPA). Under Section 45 of PHIPA, this designation allows ICES to collect and use administrative data for the purposes of monitoring and evaluating the provincial health system. To be eligible to collect and use information under this authority, an organization must receive the approval of the Information and Privacy Commissioner of Ontario (the IPC), which must find that the organization is equipped to protect it. All ICES policies, practices and procedures for using data are reviewed and approved by the IPC every three years.

== Methodology and data holdings ==
The ICES data repository consists of patient-level, coded and linkable health records. It includes publicly funded administrative health services records for the Ontario population eligible for universal health coverage since 1986, within Ontario's population of 14.7 million (as of 2019). Through partnerships, the data repository also securely links data from a variety of health surveys and registries. By linking the different data sets together using anonymous numeric unique identifiers, ICES scientists track different aspects of health service use and patient outcomes over time and across the province.

== Examples of research impact ==
1. A 1997 ICES study led by Dr. Donald Redelmeier and published in the New England Journal of Medicine on the links between mobile phone use and motor vehicle collisions helped lay the groundwork for legislation banning driver cell phone use in Ontario and many other jurisdictions.
2. A 2004 ICES study led by Dr. Muhammad Mamdani published in The Lancet found that of 45,000 Ontario seniors prescribed rofecoxib, 80% had an increase in hospital admissions for heart failure, while patients using other NSAIDs had a 40% increase. Although the absolute risk for heart failure was less than 1%, this finding was significant, given that more than 1 in 5 Ontario seniors were taking these medications. Vioxx was withdrawn from the market later that year.
3. A 2006 ICES study led by Dr. Laura Park- Wyllie showed that gatifloxacin, a commonly prescribed antibiotic marketed as Tequin, could cause potentially life-threatening blood sugar abnormalities. The investigation showed that patients treated for low blood sugar levels were more than four times as likely to have received gatifloxacin as other common antibiotics, while those hospitalized with high blood sugar levels were nearly 17 times as likely to have been treated with the medication. Health Canada issued a warning shortly after the study appeared in the New England Journal of Medicine, and soon after, the drug's manufacturer announced it was halting production.
4. ICES research into the impact of mandatory reporting on reducing hospital-acquired Clostridioides difficile infections led by Dr. Nick Daneman has influenced Ontario's MOHLTC policies on mandatory hospital reporting of quality improvement targets.
5. A 2013 ICES study led by Thérèse Stukel identified nearly 80 informal multispecialty physician networks that formed the theoretical basis for the Ontario Community Health Links initiative currently underway for managing care for patients with complex conditions. The concept was cited as a model for using big data in the public interest in the 2015 Government of Canada "Report of the Advisory Panel on Healthcare Innovation" led by Dr. David Naylor.
6. Work led by ICES chief science officer Astrid Guttmann in 2015 showed that the number of children and youth being treated for concussion in Ontario had risen sharply during 2003–2011. Concern with these findings helped pave the way for the implementation of "Rowan's Law," requiring measures be taken to prevent and mitigate head injuries due to participation in youth sports.
7. The 2015 ICES research report "Brain Disorders in Ontario: Prevalence, Incidence and Costs from Health Administrative Data" produced in collaboration with the Ontario Brain Institute is being used in 2016 to plan Ontario's Dementia Strategy.
8. A 2015 ICES Western study led by Dr. Amit Garg and published in the New England Journal of Medicine showed the feasibility of a new technique to assess risk in living kidney donor candidates, which showed that some donors are unnecessarily excluded as donors for kidney transplantation due to older age or comorbidities. The findings form a framework for the new international clinical practice guidelines in living kidney donation and a risk assessment tool that is being used with donor candidates in Ontario as part of the informed consent process.
9. Due to a rapid rise in the number of research studies conducted using routinely collected health data, ICES researchers were part of an international committee of researchers who published reporting guidelines called "RECORD" for all observational studies conducted using health data, which are applicable to research using health administrative data, electronic health records, registries, and other data sources. RECORD has been endorsed and implemented by over 15 journals since its publication in October 2015, including the PLoS group of journals, JAMA, The BMJ, and CMAJ.

== See also ==
- Canada Health Act
- Canadian Institute for Health Information
- Health care in Canada
- Information and Privacy Commissioner of Ontario
- Ontario Health Insurance Plan
- Ontario Ministry of Health and Long-Term Care
