= Meric Gertler =

Canadian academic and university administrator (born 1955)

Meric Gertler CM FRSC MCIP FAcSS FBA
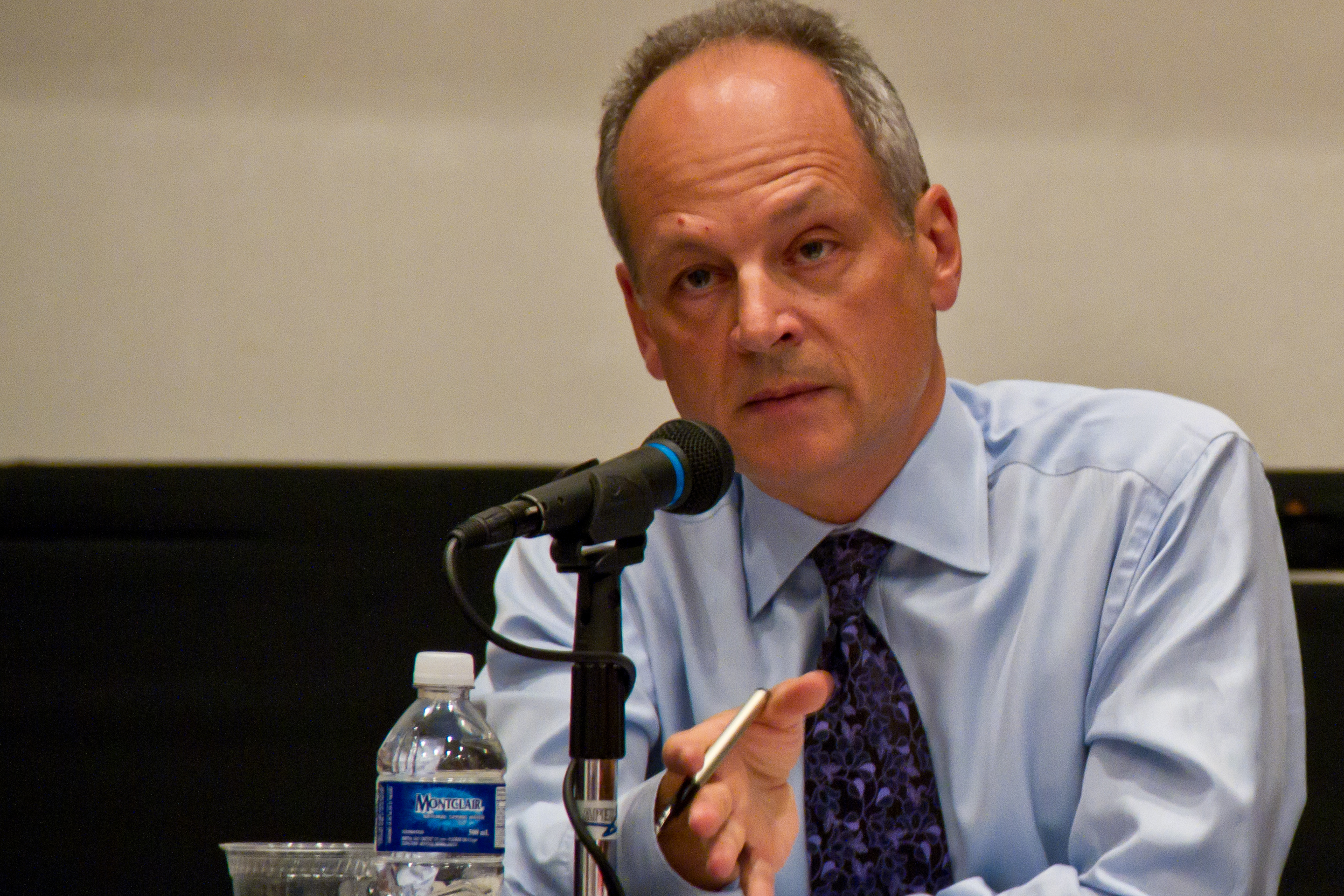
- Gertler in 2010

16th President of the University of Toronto
- In office November 1, 2013 – July 1, 2025
- Chancellor: Michael Wilson; Rose Patten; Wes Hall
- Preceded by: David Naylor
- Succeeded by: Melanie Woodin

17th Dean of the University of Toronto Faculty of Arts and Science
- In office December 1, 2008 – November 1, 2013
- Preceded by: Pekka K. Sinervo
- Succeeded by: David Cameron

Personal details
- Born: Meric Slover Gertler; April 20, 1955 (age 71) Edmonton, Alberta, Canada
- Education: McMaster University (BA); University of California, Berkeley (MCP); Harvard University (PhD)

Academic background
- Thesis: Capital dynamics and regional development (1983)

Academic work
- Discipline: urban planning
- Institutions: University of Toronto

Meric Slover Gertler (born April 20, 1955) is a Canadian academic who served as the 16th president of the University of Toronto from 2013 to 2025. Previously, he served as dean of the Faculty of Arts and Science at the university from 2008 to 2013.

== Life and career ==
Gertler was born to a Jewish family in Edmonton, Alberta, Canada, and grew up in several cities in Southern Ontario. His mother, born in what was then Czechoslovakia, survived the Holocaust. Gertler completed his undergraduate education at McMaster University, where he graduated summa cum laude in 1977. He received a Master of City Planning from the University of California, Berkeley, in 1979 and a Doctorate of Philosophy from Harvard University in 1983. His dissertation was entitled "Capital Dynamics and Regional Development".

Gertler joined the University of Toronto's Department of Geography and Planning as a lecturer in 1983. He was promoted to associate professor in 1988 and full professor in 1993, at which point he also received tenure.

He became dean of the Faculty of Arts and Science in 2008. In 2013, he was appointed the 16th president of the University of Toronto, succeeding David Naylor.

Gertler's work focuses on the geography of innovative activity and the economies of city-regions. His work also examines the local nature of a globalized economy, focusing on manufacturing as embedded within local cultural norms, practice, and assumptions. Gertler's work examines the role of tacit knowledge and interactive learning in explaining local agglomeration economies and innovation. Gertler is the author, co-author or co-editor of more than 80 scholarly publications and seven books. These have had significant impact in his field and have led him to be one of Canada's most highly cited geographers.

Gertler has served as an advisor to local, regional and national governments in Canada, the United States and Europe, as well as to international agencies such as the Organisation for Economic Co-operation and Development and the European Union. He was the founding co-director of the Program on Globalization and Regional Innovation Systems (PROGRIS) at the Munk School of Global Affairs, served as director of the Department of Geography's Program in Planning and holds the Goldring Chair in Canadian Studies.

Gertler has held visiting appointments at institutions including the University of Oxford, University College London, the University of Oslo and the University of California, Los Angeles.

In June 2025, Gertler was succeeded by Melanie Woodin as president of the University of Toronto.

== Awards and honours ==
Gertler has also been a Fellow of the Royal Society of Canada since 2003.

He received the 2014 Distinguished Alumni Award from the University of California, Berkeley and the 2014 Distinguished Scholarship Honor from the Association of American Geographers (AAG).

In May 2012, he was awarded an honorary Doctor of Philosophy degree from Sweden's Lund University, for his exceptional contributions to the fields of economic geography and regional development. In the same year, he was made an Academician of the Academy of Social Sciences (UK), becoming the first University of Toronto scholar inducted and one of only two Canadian members of the Academy.

He has been a Senior Fellow of Massey College since 2000.

A textbook co-edited by Gertler, the Oxford Handbook of Economic Geography, received the Choice Magazine's "Outstanding Academic Book" award.

He won the 2007 Award for Scholarly Distinction from the Canadian Association of Geographers.

In December 2015, Gertler was awarded the Order of Canada with the grade of member. He was elected as a Corresponding Fellow of the British Academy in 2015.

== Controversies ==
=== Dismissal from Board of Waterfront Toronto ===
On 6 December 2018, Gertler was among three board members fired by the Ontario Provincial government from Waterfront Toronto, a public agency working on a "revitalization" project for the city’s waterfront through a partnership with Alphabet, Google’s parent company.

=== Pro-Palestine protest encampment ===
During a pro-Palestinian protest encampment at King's College Circle in May 2024, Gerter stated "that a trespass notice will be issued if an agreement is not reached with encampment organizers"; Gertler stated that convocation ceremonies in June would proceed "no matter what". On May 24, a trespass notice was issued, informing students they had until May 27 to leave, "before the school pursues consequences under University policies and the law," including expulsion or suspension of up to five years. When the encampment remained in place, Gertler's administration applied for an expedited court injunction allowing police to arrest and remove students. The encampment nonetheless continued throughout June, with convocation ceremonies occurring against the backdrop of the pro-Palestinian protests.

== Selected publications ==
- Gertler, M. S. 2004. Manufacturing Culture: the Institutional Geography of Industrial Practice. Oxford: Oxford University Press.
- Gertler, M. S. 2003. A cultural economic geography of production: are we learning by doing? In The Handbook of Cultural Geography, eds. K. Anderson, M. Domosh, S. Pile and N. Thrift, 131-146. London: Sage.
- Gertler, M. S. and D.A. Wolfe, eds. 2002. Innovation and Social Learning: Institutional Adaptation in an Era of Technological Change. Basingstoke, UK: Macmillan/Palgrave.
- Rutherford, T. D. and M. S. Gertler. 2002. Labour in 'lean' times: geography, scale and the national trajectories of workplace change. Transactions, Institute of British Geographers NS27: 1-18.
