= Wes Hall (businessman) =

Canadian businessman

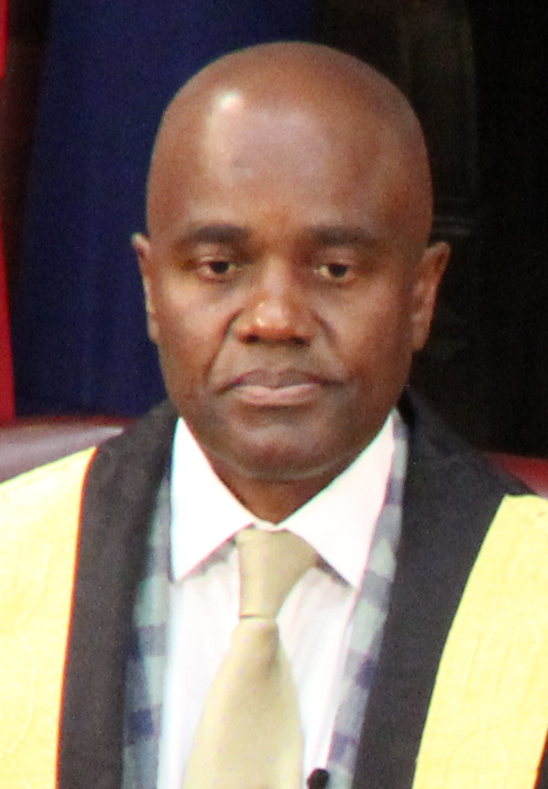
- Hall in 2024

35th Chancellor of the University of Toronto
- Incumbent
- Assumed office July 1, 2024
- President: Meric Gertler; Melanie Woodin
- Preceded by: Rose Patten

Personal details
- Born: November 6, 1968 (age 57) Saint Thomas, Jamaica
- Occupation: Businessman, entrepreneur
- Known for: Dragons' Den

Wesley J. Hall is a Canadian businessman and entrepreneur, best known as a "Dragon" investor in the Canadian reality television series Dragons' Den. He has served as the 35th chancellor of the University of Toronto since July 1, 2024.

== Early life and education ==
Born and raised in Saint Thomas, Jamaica, Hall moved to Toronto, Ontario, as a teenager. Hall attended George Brown College to be educated as a law clerk.

== Career ==
After completing his education, Hall worked in the legal division of CanWest until founding Kingsdale Advisors, a shareholder services and business consultancy, in 2002. In 2006, the firm became a major player in Canadian business when it managed Xstrata's purchase and takeover of Falconbridge. He also later established QM Environmental, an environmental remediation firm.

In 2020 he launched the BlackNorth Initiative, an organization which works to combat racism in business.

He joined Dragons' Den in 2021 for the show's 16th season.

In 2022, Hall wrote his autobiography No Bootstraps When You're Barefoot.

Hall was awarded an honorary doctorate from the University of Toronto in 2023. In 2024, he was elected to serve as the university's 35th chancellor, and has held the office since July 1, 2024.
