= Thérèse Stukel =

Canadian statistician

Thérèse A. Stukel
- Education: University of Ottawa; University of Grenoble; Pierre and Marie Curie University; Paris Dauphine University; University of Toronto
- Occupation: Statistician
- Employer(s): Institute for Clinical Evaluative Sciences; University of Toronto; Dartmouth College
- Awards: Fellow of the American Statistical Association

Thérèse A. Stukel is a Canadian statistician who works as a senior core scientist at the Institute for Clinical Evaluative Sciences, as a professor in the Institute of Health Policy, Management and Evaluation of the University of Toronto, and as an adjunct professor of epidemiology and of The Dartmouth Institute for Health Policy and Clinical Practice at Dartmouth College. Topics in her research include surgical mortality, the effects of regional variations in healthcare spending, and heart-related health care.

== Education and career ==
Stukel studied mathematics at the University of Ottawa, graduating in 1973. and earned a maîtrise (one-year master's degree) in applied mathematics from the University of Grenoble in 1974. After completing a diploma in advanced studies in statistics jointly from Pierre and Marie Curie University and Paris Dauphine University in 1975, she returned to Canada for a Ph.D. in statistics at the University of Toronto in 1983. Her dissertation, supervised by David F. Andrews, was Generalized Logistic Models.

She became an assistant professor of statistics at Old Dominion University in 1983, and in 1984 moved to Dartmouth College as an assistant professor of biostatistics. In 2002 she moved to the Institute for Clinical Evaluative Sciences, as vice president for research, and at the same time took a position as a professor at the University of Toronto.

== Recognition ==
She became a Fellow of the American Statistical Association in 2007.
