= Sarah Woodin =

American biologist

Sarah Woodin is an American biologist currently at University of South Carolina and an Elected Fellow of the American Association for the Advancement of Science.
