= Melanie Woodin =

President of the University of Toronto

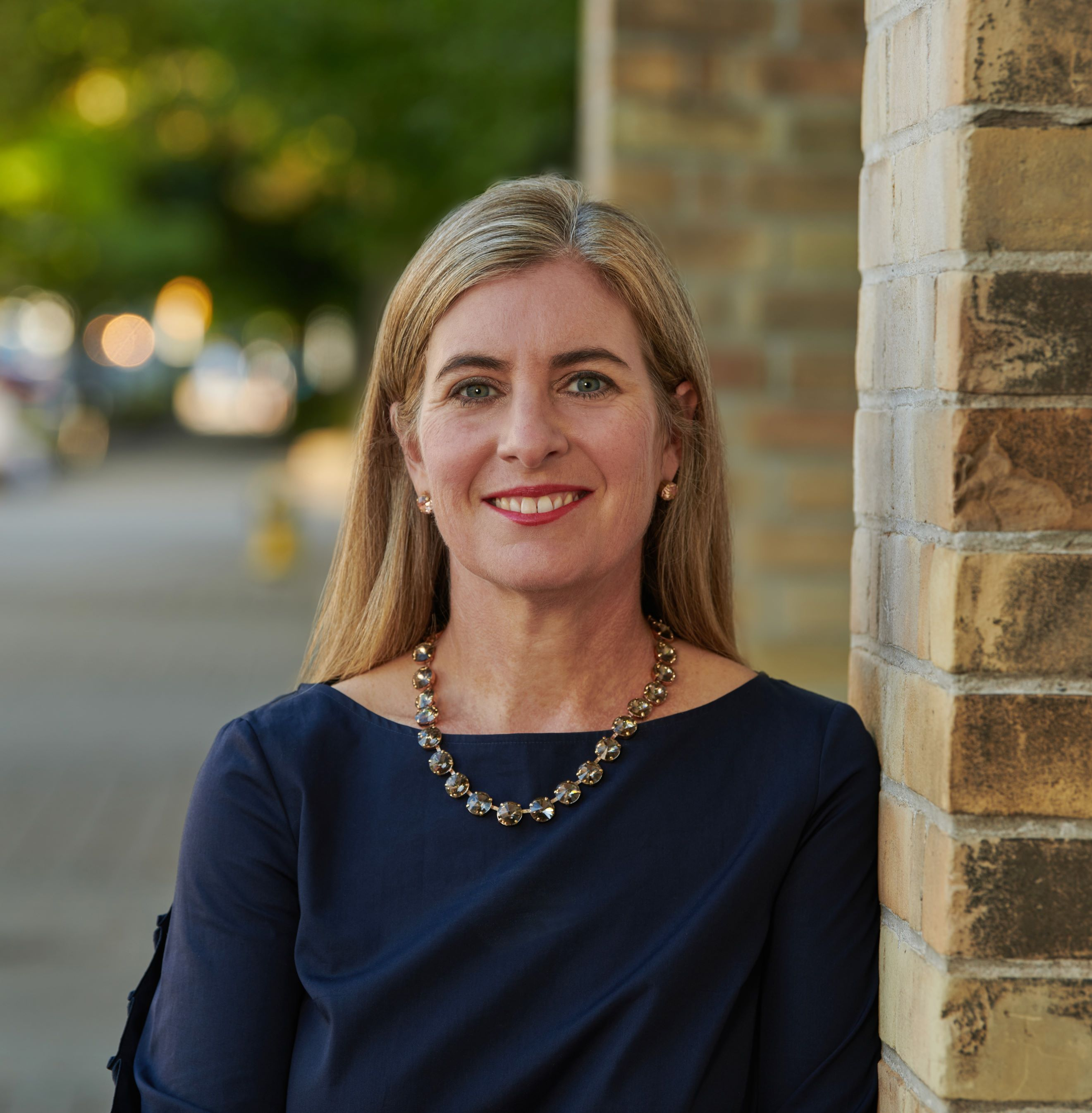
- Woodin in 2021

17th President of the University of Toronto
- Incumbent
- Assumed office July 1, 2025
- Chancellor: Wes Hall
- Preceded by: Meric Gertler

19th Dean of the University of Toronto Faculty of Arts and Science
- In office July 1, 2019 – July 1, 2025
- Preceded by: David Cameron
- Succeeded by: Stephen Wright

Personal details
- Born: Montreal, Quebec, Canada
- Education: University of Toronto (BSc, MSc); University of Calgary (PhD)
- Scientific career
- Fields: Neuroscience
- Workplaces: University of Toronto
- Thesis: The Role of Trophic Factors in Synapse Formation and Plasticity between Identified Lymnaea Neurons (2001)

Melanie A. Woodin is a Canadian neuroscientist and academic administrator who has served as the 17th president of the University of Toronto since July 1, 2025. She is the first woman to hold the office. Woodin previously served as dean of the Faculty of Arts and Science at the University of Toronto, a position she began in 2019.

== Life and career ==
Woodin was born in Montreal, Quebec and graduated from the University of Toronto in 1995 with a Bachelor of Science in biology and a Master of Science in zoology in 1997. In 2001, she completed her Ph.D. in neuroscience from the University of Calgary, then completed her postdoctoral studies at the University of California, Berkeley.

Woodin joined the University of Toronto as assistant professor in the Department of Zoology in 2004. She established the Woodin Lab which she continues to lead.

She has served as the Associate Chair, Undergraduate Studies (Cell & Systems Biology 2014–15), Director of the Human Biology Program (2015–17), Associate Dean, Undergraduate Studies and Academic Planning (2018), and the Vice-Dean, Interdivisional Partnerships in the Faculty of Arts and Science (2019).

She serves on the board of directors at the Vector Institute for Artificial Intelligence. She is a member of the Canadian Brain Research Strategy leadership and was the President of the Canadian Association for Neuroscience, an association dedicated to advancing brain research.

She was elected the 17th president of the University of Toronto in 2025 and has held the role since July 1, 2025.

== Awards and honours ==
In 2014, Woodin was named Neuroscience Alumnus of the Year by the Hotchkiss Brain Institute at the University of Calgary. In 2022, she received the Alumni of Distinction Award from the Cumming School of Medicine.

She has been a Senior Fellow of the University of Toronto's Massey College since 2019.
