= List of University of Guelph people =

The following is a list of notable alumni, faculty and affiliates of University of Guelph in Canada.

== Chancellors ==
At its first convocation on May 21, 1965 George Drew was installed as chancellor of the University.

- George Drew (1965–1971)
- Emmett Matthew Hall (1971–1977)
- Pauline Mills McGibbon (1977–1983)
- William Atcheson Stewart (1983–1989)
- Lincoln Alexander (1991–2007)
- Pamela Wallin (2007–2011)
- David Mirvish (2012–2017)
- Martha Billes (2017–2022)
- Mary Anne Chambers (2022–present)

== Presidents ==
- John Douglas MacLachlan (1964–1967)
- William Winegard (1967–1975)
- Donald Forster (1975–1983)
- Burton Matthews (1983–1988)
- Brian Segal (1988–1993)
- Mordechai Rozanski (1993–2003)
- Alastair Summerlee (2003–2014)
- Franco Vaccarino (2014–2020)
- Charlotte Yates (Interim) (2020–2021)
- Charlotte Yates (2021–2024)
- Rene Van Acker (2024-)

== Notable alumni ==
- Edmund Abaka – professor of African history at the University of Miami
- Sara Angelucci – artist and professor at Ryerson University
- Edgar Archibald – agricultural scientist
- Allan Armitage – author and professor at the University of Georgia
- George Atkins – broadcaster
- Rupan Bal – Canadian–Indian YouTuber
- Chris Banks – poet
- Toby Barrett – politician, Member of Provincial Parliament for Haldimand—Norfolk
- Alexandra Beaton – actress and dancer
- Karen Beauchemin – research scientist
- Deni Ellis Béchard – Canadian-American novelist
- Jennifer Beech – Canadian television host
- Laura Bertram – actress
- Roberta Bondar – Canada's first female astronaut
- Mark Bourrie – lawyer and journalist
- Tim Bray – software developer and entrepreneur
- Karen Bailey – scientist
- Harry Brightwell - veterinarian and politician
- Ryder Britton - actor
- Christa Brosseau - Canada Research Chair in Sustainable Chemistry and Materials
- James Robert Brown - philosopher
- Krista Buecking
- Tyler Clark Burke – artist, illustrator, designer, and writer
- Kathy Butler
- Mikey Bustos – YouTuber, businessman, actor, and singer
- Cassie Campbell
- Dom Cardillo
- David Castle
- Anna Chatterton
- Dicki Chhoyang
- George Chiang
- Meredith Chivers
- Olivia Chow – 66th mayor of Toronto
- Reid Coolsaet
- Claude Cormier
- Anne Croy – reproductive immunologist
- Elisabeth de Mariaffi – novelist and short story writer
- Diane Deans
- Susan Dobson
- Peter Donaldson
- Maura Doyle – multimedia artist
- Ernest Charles Drury – eighth Premier of Ontario
- John Dunsworth – actor
- Azadeh Elmizadeh – visual artist
- Rick Ferraro
- Matt Finlin - filmmaker
- Graham Forsythe
- James E. Fraser
- John Kenneth Galbraith – economist
- Harry L. Garrigus
- Keegan Gaunt
- Hollay Ghadery – writer
- Nora Gould – poet
- Tim Grant
- Peter S. Gray
- Michael Grimes (Associate Diploma 1920), Irish scientist and first professor of microbiology at University College Cork
- Bill Hanley – Hockey Hall of Fame member
- Donald Arthur Hatch — academic
- Tara Hedican
- Graham Henderson
- George Stewart Henry – tenth Premier of Ontario
- Stephen Hicks
- Robert Horner
- Liz Howard – poet and winner of the 2016 Griffin Poetry Prize
- Nasrin Husseini – (MSc 2020) Afghani refugee advocate, veterinary researcher, and food activist
- Aisha Sasha John – poet
- Alexis Jordan
- David Joseph
- Joy Laking
- Mark Lautens
- Robert Leigh
- Matt Lennox
- Canisia Lubrin – poet
- Karen Ludwig
- Grant MacEwan – ninth Lieutenant Governor of Alberta
- H.R. MacMillan – forester, industrialist, wartime administrator, and philanthropist
- Judy Maddren
- Charlie Masters
- Brandon Maxwell
- Tom McBroom
- Scott McGillivray
- Audrey McLaughlin
- Heather McNairn
- Gord Miller
- K. D. Miller
- Kenneth Mitchell
- Kimberly Moffit
- Peter Moss
- Jacey Murphy
- Ian Murray
- Brendan Myers
- Opendra Narayan
- Piers Nash
- Joe Neilands
- Harry Nixon – thirteenth Premier of Ontario
- Greg O'Gallagher
- Dominique O'Rourke – politician
- Penny Park
- Roula Partheniou – artist
- Cecil Frederick Patterson
- Soraya Peerbaye – poet
- Mirela Rahneva
- Lisa Raitt
- Jordan Raycroft
- Jus Reign – Canadian Comedian and YouTube Personality
- Sue Richards
- Jael Richardson
- Doug Rollins
- Liz Sandals
- Laurel Schafer – Canada Research Chair in catalyst development
- Kian Schaffer-Baker – CFL player
- Dolph Schluter
- James Schroder
- John W. Semple
- H. B. Sharman
- Jonathan Sherbino
- Kalidas Shetty
- Vandana Shiva
- Jane Siberry – singer / songwriter
- Evan Siddall – business leader
- Michael Sona – political figure
- Ralph Spence
- John Steffler
- R.H. Stover – phytopathologist
- Bernadine Strik – horticulturist
- Derek Sullivan – Contemporary Visual Artist
- Mary Swan – Novelist
- Marwan Tabbara – Former MP for Kitchener South—Hespeler
- Chase Tang – actor and mental health advocate
- Stephen J. Tanner – Chief of Police of the Halton Regional Police Service
- Lisa Thompson – MPP and Minister of Rural Affairs
- Stanley Thompson – golf course architect
- Kelly Thornton – theatre director
- Ayelet Tsabari – novelist and winner of the Sami Rohr Prize
- Dr John Tweedie —tv personality and evangelist
- Jane Urquhart – novelist and poet
- Lyle Vanclief – minister of Agriculture
- Dennis vanEngelsdorp – assistant professor at University of Maryland
- Paul Vermeersch – poet
- Mike Wallace – politician
- Hope Weiler – associate professor at McGill University
- Zoe Whittall – novelist and Canadian Screen Award-winning screenwriter
- Emma-Jayne Wilson – jockey
- Terry Wilson – police officer
- John Wise – politician
- Jane Wright – entomologist
- Elizabeth Yake – film producer
- Cara Elizabeth Yar Khan – disability advocate, public speaker, and United Nations humanitarian
- Alissa York – novelist
- Jiyuan Yu – philosopher
- Charles Ambrose Zavitz – pioneered the development of soybeans for commercial use in Ontario
- Edmund Zavitz – pioneer in re-forestation in Ontario
