= Lislehurst =

Historic house at the University of Toronto Mississauga

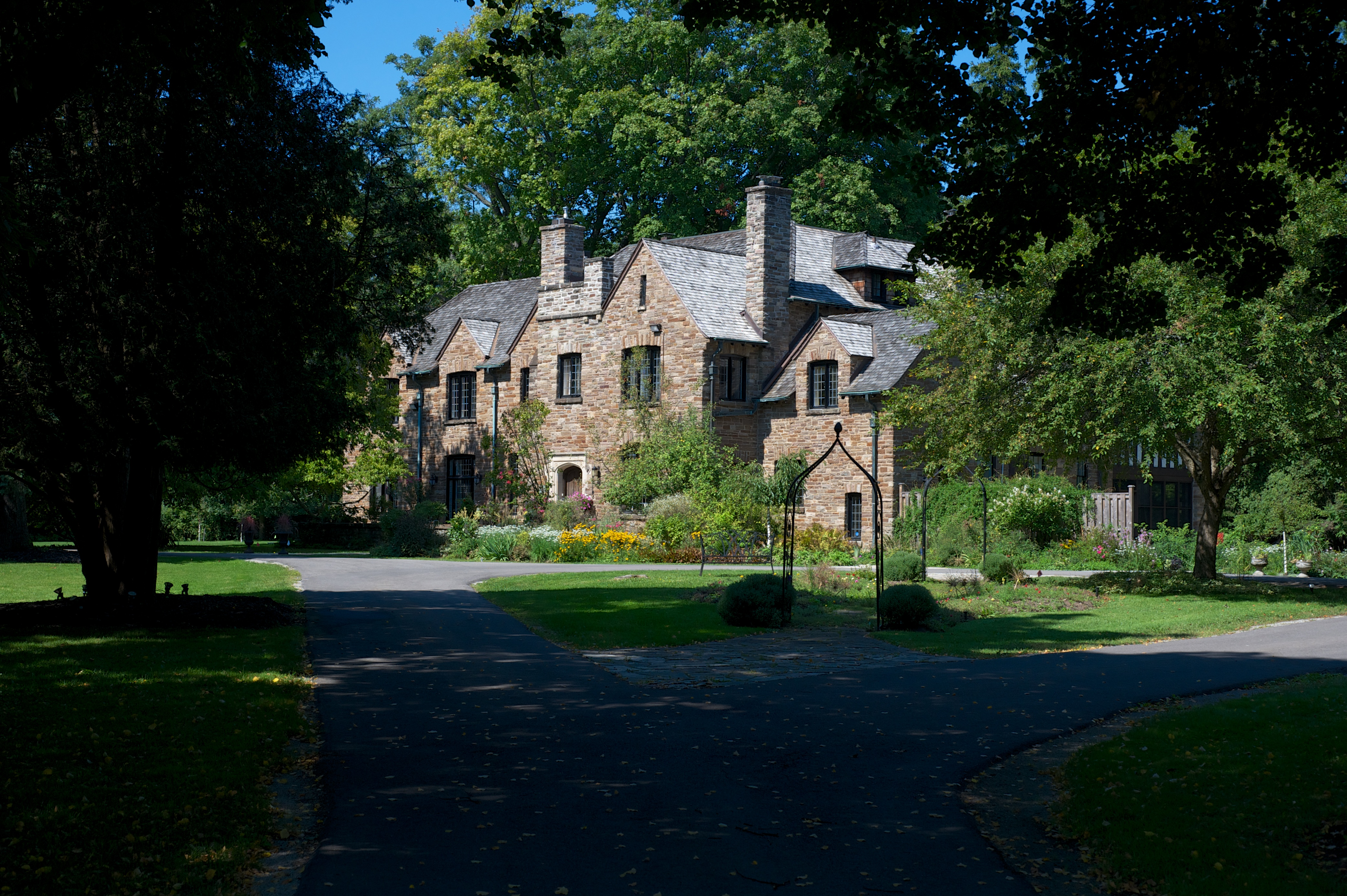
- The building in 2012

General information
- Type: Residential
- Location: 3369 Principal's Road, Mississauga, Ontario, Canada
- Coordinates: 43°33′17″N 79°40′08″W
- Current tenants: Alexandra Gillespie (Principal of UTM)
- Completed: c. 1885
- Owner: University of Toronto (1963–present)

Technical details
- Floor count: 2 ½

Ontario Heritage Act
- Criteria: Designated Part IV
- Designated: September 23, 1985
- Reference no.: 14962

Lislehurst is a historical 19th-century house located on the Mississauga campus of the University of Toronto in Mississauga, Ontario, Canada. Built in 1885, the property was acquired by the University of Toronto in 1963, and today serves as the official residence of its vice-president and Mississauga campus principal. The building is a Historic Place, designated under part IV of the Ontario Heritage Act since 1985. Lislehurst is situated within a wooded area at the northern end of the campus along the valley of the Credit River.

== History ==
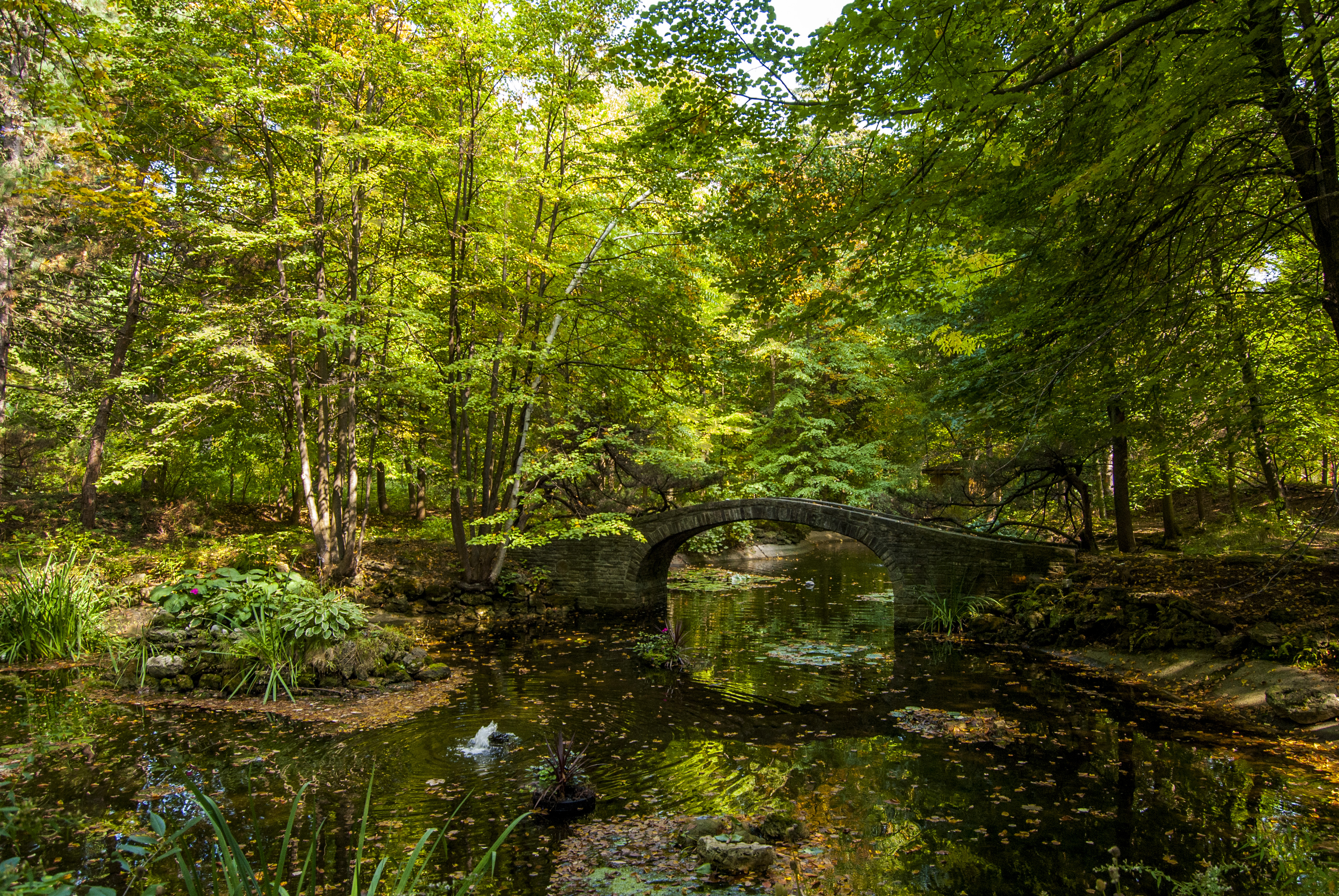
The Lislehurst (or Wilson Pond) Bridge, believed to have been built in the 1920s–30s by Reginald Watkins.

Lislehurst's property was originally a Crown grant to the brothers of Sir Isaac Brock, who gifted it to the Schreiber family in 1869. The Schreiber family had immigrated to Canada in 1840 from Guernsey Island in the Channel Islands of England, and were descendants of the Brock family. They were devoted members of St. Peter's Anglican Church nearby in Erindale.

The family built three houses on the property: Mount Woodham, home of Weymouth and Charlotte Schreiber; Lislehurst, home of Herbert Harrie Schreiber and family; and Iverholme, home of Weymouth deLisle Schreiber and family. Lislehurst was completed circa 1885. The Schreibers sold 50 acres of the land in 1928 to Reginald Watkins, a businessman from Hamilton. Under Watkins' ownership, Woodham was demolished in 1928 and Lislehurst underwent extensive renovations using materials from with Woodham's demolition.

Iverholm, one of the three houses on the Schreiber property, burned down in 1913, leaving only its stone foundation.

In 1963, Watkins' property and nearby farm lots were purchased by the University of Toronto. The land south of Lislehurst became the campus of Erindale College, now known as the University of Toronto Mississauga (UTM), and the house has since been used as the residence for its principal.

A small house on Principal's Road commissioned in the mid-1800s by Charlotte Schreiber, which served as her cottage while Lislehurst was being built, has since been used for various purposes by the university including the residence of artist David Blackwood during his time at Erindale College. The cottage remains today and has been used as the university's Forensic Anthropology Field School, dubbed the "Forensic Crime Scene House", since 2013. The initial idea behind the field school was to locate where Iverholm and Woodham once stood, however finding the location of Woodham before it was demolished remains an ongoing research project.

A stone bridge over a pond near Lislehurst is a popular photo spot on the campus. Believed to have been built by Reginald Watkins in the 1920s–30s, it is sometimes referred to as the Wilson Pond Bridge or Lislehurst Bridge.

On September 23, 1985, Lislehurst was registered to the Canadian Register of Historic Places by the City of Mississauga, designated under part IV of the Ontario Heritage Act.

== Architecture ==
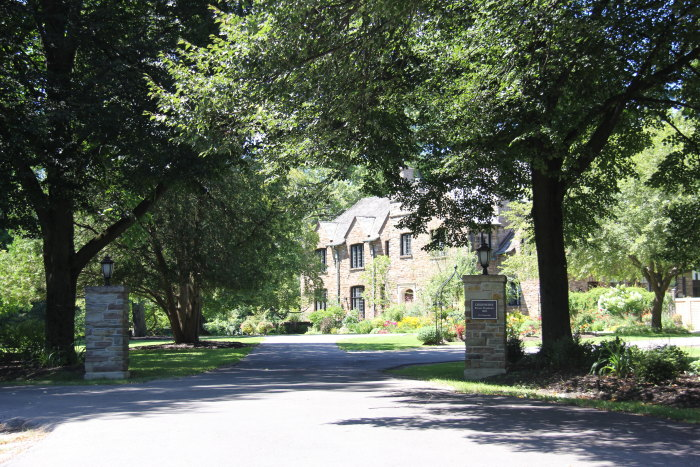
The property in 2013

Lislehurst is two and a half storeys tall and predominantly made of stone obtained from the Credit Valley. It features a gable roof and seven stone chimneys. The building reflects the 1920s movement to renovate older buildings in a Tudor style. It currently looks nothing like the original house as renovations in 1928 involved the removal of the gingerbread decoration and the addition of an exposed stucco and timber and finish. Reginald Watkins added a west wing and reversed the front of the building, making the original rear the new front entry and facade.

== Legacy ==
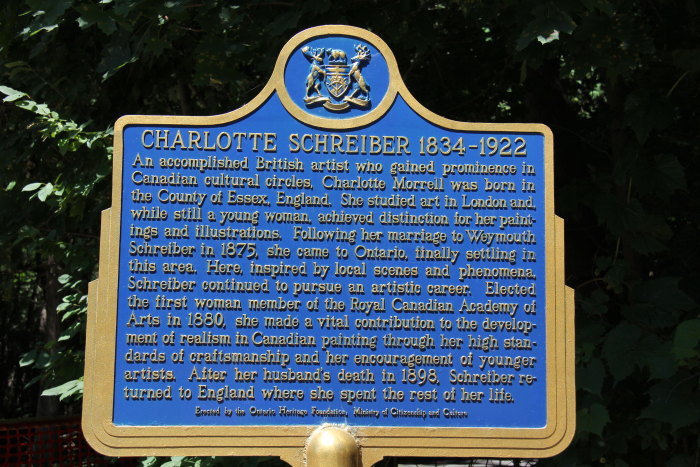
An Ontario Heritage Trust plaque dedicated to Charlotte Schreiber

The house's library, called the Schreiber Room, was named in honour of Charlotte Mount Brock Schreiber, a notable English painter who was part of the Schreiber family and lived in Mount Woodham. Charlotte's painting, The Croppy Boy can be found at the National Gallery of Canada in Ottawa. Charlotte's role in early Canadian art is noted on an Ontario Heritage Trust plaque on the property.

The Schreiberwood Residence at the University of Toronto Mississauga is named after the Schreiber family.

== See also ==
- 93 Highland Avenue, residence of the University of Toronto president
- List of historic places in the Regional Municipality of Peel
- List of University of Toronto buildings
