= Cailín Óg a Stór =

Song
- Language: Irish
- English title: "The Croppy Boy"
- Published: 1582
- Genre: Broadside ballad
- Songwriter: Unknown

Cailín Óg a Stór (Irish for "O Darling Young Girl") is a traditional Irish melody, originally accepted for publication in March 1582. It may be the source of Pistol's cryptic line in Henry V, Caleno custure me. It is part of a broadside collection from 1584. The poem "The Croppy Boy" was set to this music, and it was later used for the tune of "Lord Franklin", which was the basis for the Bob Dylan song "Bob Dylan's Dream". The melody is also used for other Irish ballads including "McCafferty".

The tune has been used for other songs including "A Sailor's Life"; a 1908 Percy Grainger phonograph recording of a man from Winchcombe, Gloucestershire, England can be heard on the British Library Sound Archive website.
