= Cecil Patterson =

Cecil Patterson may refer to:

- Cecil Patterson (bishop), Anglican bishop
- Cecil Frederick Patterson, Canadian horticulturalist
- Cecil T. Patterson, American karateka
- C. H. Patterson (Cecil Holden Patterson), American psychologist and writer
