= Alastair Summerlee =

President of the University of Guelph

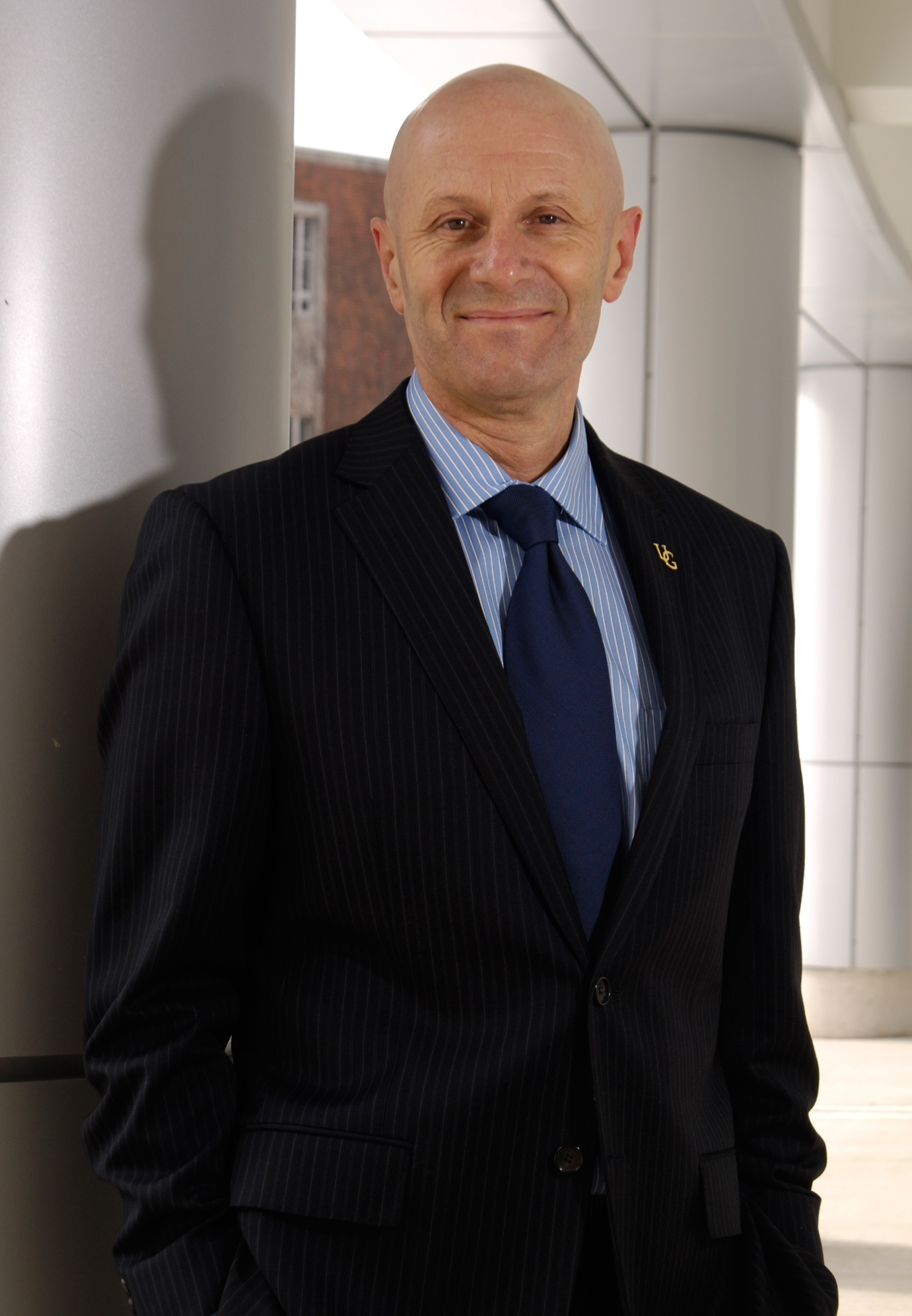

Interim President and Vice-Chancellor of Carleton University
- In office 2017 – June 30, 2018
- Preceded by: Roseann Runte; Samy Mahmoud
- Succeeded by: Benoit-Antoine Bacon

7th President of the University of Guelph
- In office January 15, 2003 – August 15, 2014
- Preceded by: Mordechai Rozanski
- Succeeded by: Franco Vaccarino

Personal details
- Education: University of Guelph
- Profession: Professor
- Website: Carleton.ca - The President and Vice-Chancellor

Alastair J. S. Summerlee was the Interim President and Vice-Chancellor of Carleton University located in Ottawa, Ontario, Canada. He was previously the seventh president of the University of Guelph.

President Summerlee, whose career as a scholar, professor, researcher, and administrator spans nearly 30 years, joined the University of Guelph faculty in 1988 as a professor in the Department of Biomedical Sciences. He was named an associate dean of the Ontario Veterinary College in 1992, dean of graduate studies in 1995, associate vice-president (academic) in 1999, and provost and vice-president (academic) in 2000.

As president of the University of Guelph, Summerlee earned $434,517.92 per year, which made him the highest-paid person at the university. He was the ninth-highest-paid university president in Canada (as of 2011), and second-highest-paid in Ontario (as of 2012).

Summerlee faced controversy for his inadequate response as president of the University of Guelph to a sexual assault in the athletics department. On September 21, 2006, the father of a female student contacted Summerlee, and provided correspondences between Dave Scott-Thomas (his daughter's running coach) and his daughter, as proof of grooming leading to sexual assault. Summerlee did not reply, despite a note that the victim was underage at the time of the abuse.
