= Mahinaarangi =

Mahinaarangi or Mahinārangi may refer to:

- Mahinaarangi wharenui, a meeting house at Turangawaewae, the Māori royal marae.
- Mahinaarangi Tocker, a New Zealand singer of Māori descent

== See also ==
- Lake Mahinerangi, in Otago, New Zealand
