= List of principals of the University of Toronto Mississauga =

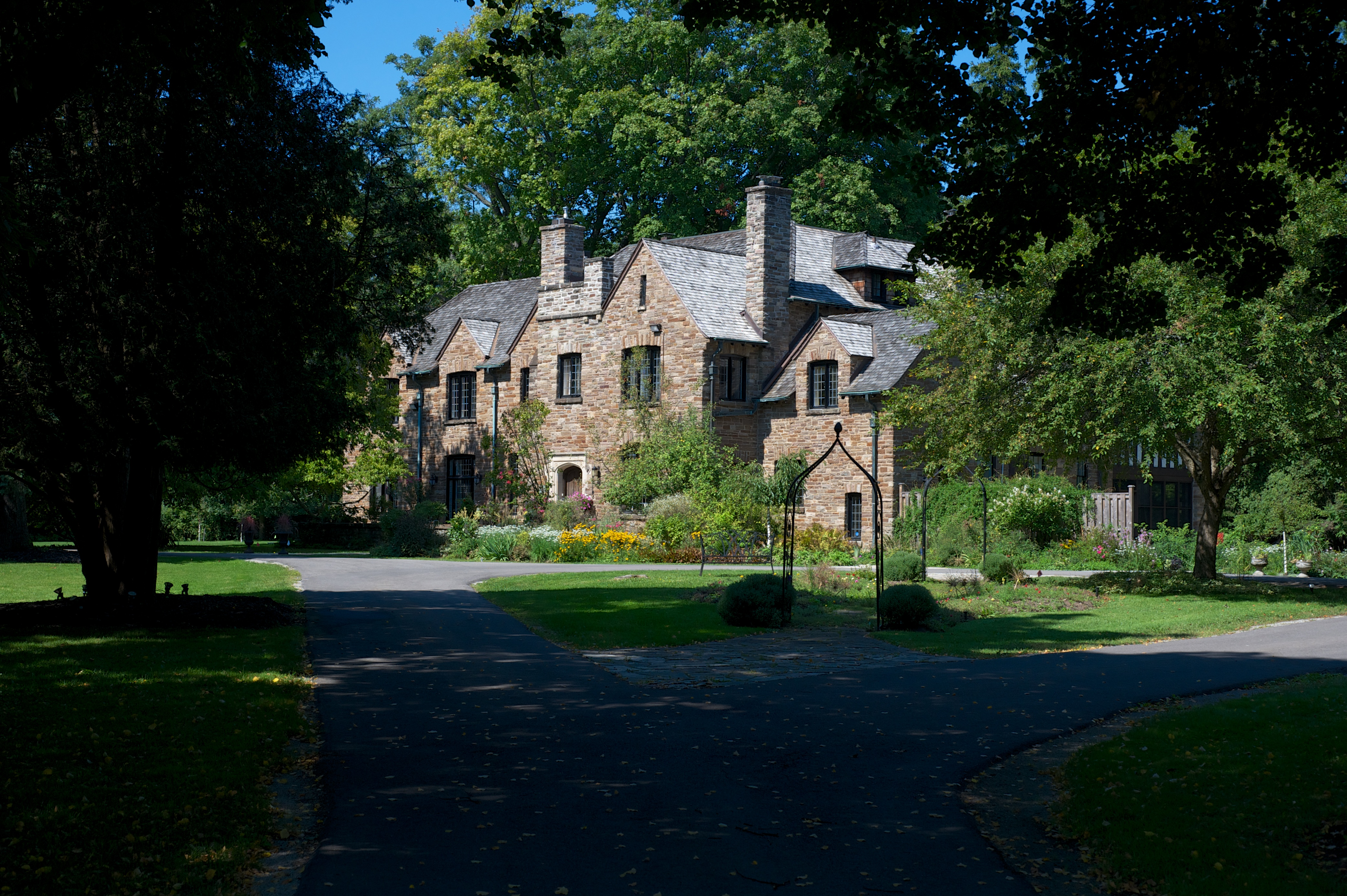
Lislehurst, the Mississauga campus principal's official residence

The University of Toronto Mississauga has had 10 principals since it was formally established as Erindale College in 1967. The role of principal was expanded to include vice-presidential responsibilities of the University of Toronto at large in 2003, following the campus's reorganization from a constituent college within the St. George–based Faculty of Arts and Science to its own academic division, citing significant growth. The vice-president and principal reports directly to the president of the University of Toronto. The current officeholder is Alexandra Gillespie, who has held the role since July 1, 2020.

Sometimes referred to as the VP-principal or VPP, the vice-president and principal is the executive head of the Mississauga campus. The VP-principal is also an ex-officio member of the UTM Campus Council, an arm of the University of Toronto Governing Council. The VP-principal's official residence is a historic house known as Lislehurst, which was built by the family of Charlotte Schreiber.

The first principal of Erindale was D. Carlton Williams, a professor of psychology who, in 1964, was tasked by then-president Claude Bissell to lead the establishment of both the university's Erindale and Scarborough campuses.

== Principals ==
No.	Image	Name	Took office	Left office
Principal of Erindale College (1967–1998)
1		D. Carlton Williams	1966	1968
2		John Tuzo Wilson	1968	1974
3		E. A. Robinson	1974	1976
4		Paul W. Fox	1976	1986
5		Desmond Morton	1986	1991
5		Desmond Morton	1992	1995
acting		Roger L. Beck	1991	1992
Principal of the University of Toronto at Mississauga (1998–2003)
6		Robert H. McNutt	1995	2002
Vice-President of the University of Toronto, Principal of the University of Toronto at Mississauga (2003–2006)
Vice-President of the University of Toronto, Principal of the University of Toronto Mississauga (2006–present)
7		Ian Orchard	2002	2006
7		Ian Orchard	2007	2010
acting		Ian Orchard	September 2019	June 30, 2020
acting		Cheryl Misak	2006	2007
8		Deep Saini	July 1, 2010	2016
interim		Ulrich Krull	September 1, 2016	June 30, 2017
9		Ulrich Krull	July 1, 2017	2019
10		Alexandra Gillespie	July 1, 2020	incumbent

== See also ==
- List of principals of the University of Toronto Scarborough
- List of provosts of the University of Toronto
