= McCafferty =

Irish ballad

"McCafferty" (Roud 1148, also known as "McCaffery" or "McKaffery") is an Irish folk ballad about British Army Private Patrick McCaffrey, executed in 1862 for the "fragging" of two officers. It is particularly popular in Ireland, where Pte. McCaffrey came from, and was recorded by The Dubliners. In the British Army it was allegedly a court martial offence to sing the song, but that is a legend. In fact, according to A.L. Lloyd "during World War II it was adopted as the anthem of a parachute commando regiment, the 2nd Special Air Service."

The song is set to the traditional Irish tune "Cailín Óg a Stór", which is the same melody used for "The Croppy Boy".

== Story ==
Patrick McCaffery was born in County Kildare, Ireland in October 1842. Deserted by his father while young, Mrs. McCaffery sent him to England to stay with a friend, Mrs. Murphy of Mossley near Manchester, where, at the age of 12, he started work in a local mill, later moving to Stalybridge. On 10 October 1860, aged 18, he took the Queen's shilling and enlisted in the 32nd (Cornwall) Regiment of Foot (Light Infantry). After enlistment he was sent to Fulwood Barracks to train with 11 Depot Battalion and then posted to 12 Coy, the 32nd Regiment.

Throughout the following months he fell foul of the Adjutant, Captain Hanham, on several occasions. Maybe deservedly so or due to Hanham being a zealous martinet. On 13 September 1861 while on sentry duty, McCaffery, ordered by HanHam, to take names of children playing near officers quarters, only managed to take one as the rest of the children ran away. The Captain brought charges and next morning he was sentenced to fourteen days confinement to barracks. Later that day Capt. Hanham and the commanding officer of the Fulwood depot, Col. Hugh Crofton, were walking across the barracks square when McCaffery loaded his musket and fired at them, at a distance of 65 yards (59.4 m), causing both to stagger and fall. A bullet passed right through Col. Crofton’s lungs then through the chest of his companion and one of his lungs and lodged in his back. After firing the shot McCaffery quietly handed his weapon to a comrade and was led, unresisting, away. Col. Crofton died next day and Capt. Hanham a few days later.

McCaffrey's trial was set for the Liverpool Assizes, where he appeared in December. The result was a foregone conclusion. The sentence was carried out on Saturday, 11 January 1862, in front of Kirkdale Gaol, at Liverpool. The sympathies of the crowd were with McCaffery, now 19 years old. The street ballad that was written sometime afterwards found the popular ear amongst the large Catholic Irish population of the North West of England.

== Recordings ==
The folklore archive Tobar an Dualchais – Kist o Riches contains a 1953 five-minute live concert recording of Ewan MacColl, which includes a brief account of where MacColl heard the song. According to MacColl, "I first heard this song sung by a group of Liverpool dockers who had been drafted into the army, and I noticed that a couple of them were standing guard very obviously outside a tent, and I bribed my way in with a half bottle of whisky and sure enough they were singing this song McCaffery." In notes for a later version included in Peggy Seeger and Ewan MacColl's collection The Singing Island, the song is described as having been collected by MacColl from Patrick Dodds of Birkenhead in 1941. Other traditional singers who have recorded the ballad include Peter Reilly, Paddy Grant, Jimmy MacBeath, "Queen" Caroline Hughes, and May Bradley.

Prominent commercial recordings include:

- Ewan MacColl, Bless 'Em All (1960)
- A.L. Lloyd, Folksongs of England (1967)
- The Dubliners, A Drop of the Hard Stuff (1967)
- Tony Capstick, Punch & Judy Man (1974)
- Bob Davenport, Postcards Home (1977)
- Sue Harris, Hammers & Tongues (1978)

== See also ==
- Johnny I Hardly Knew Ye
