= E. A. Robinson =

British-Canadian chemist (1933–2026)

3rd Principal of Erindale College, Toronto
- In office 1974–1976
- Preceded by: John Tuzo Wilson
- Succeeded by: Paul W. Fox

2nd Dean of Erindale College, Toronto
- In office 1969–1976
- Preceded by: John S. Colman
- Succeeded by: Cheryl Misak

1st Associate Dean of Erindale College, Toronto
- In office 1966–1969
- Preceded by: Position established
- Succeeded by: William J. Huggett

Personal details
- Born: Edward Arthur Robinson; 1933 England
- Died: July 2026 (aged 93) Bristol, UK
- Education: University College London (BSc, PhD); University of London (DSc)
- Scientific career
- Fields: Organic chemistry
- Workplaces: University of Toronto Mississauga

Edward Arthur "Peter" Robinson (1933 – July 2026) was a British-Canadian chemist and professor emeritus at the University of Toronto Mississauga. He played a significant role in the establishment the university's Mississauga campus (originally known as Erindale College) in the 1960s and 70s, acting as its first associate dean, and later as dean and principal.

== Biography ==
Robinson was born in 1933 in England and attended Alleyn's School, a grammar school in Dulwich, London. He went on to attend University College London and graduated with a bachelor of science degree in 1955 and a doctor of philosophy in 1958. He graduated with a doctor of science from the University of London in 1959.

Robinson moved to Canada in 1958 as a post-doctoral fellow at McMaster University where he taught chemistry. He joined the University of Toronto in 1961 as an assistant professor in the Department of Chemistry at the St. George campus.

In 1966, he was asked by David Carlton Williams, the vice-president for Erindale College and Scarborough College and principal of Erindale, to help organize the campus. During this time, Erindale had only 12 faculty and 150 students. Robinson began as associate dean in 1966 and saw the campus's establishment in 1967, remaining in the role until 1969. Robinson became its second dean that same year, following John S. Colman.

In 1974, Robinson became Erindale's third principal after his close friend and predecessor John Tuzo Wilson left to become director general of the Ontario Science Centre.

He retired from administrative roles in 1976 to return to lecturing full-time.

Robinson was awarded a College Award in 1988 for his contributions to Erindale College, and an Arbor Award from the University of Toronto in 2006 for his service to the university.

Robinson died in July 2026 in Bristol, UK, at the age of 93.

== Research ==
Peter Robinson's research was primarily focused on the chemistry of sulphuric acid. His work contributed to the invention of superacids, pioneered the use of the Toronto Mercury Arc-Lamp, and discovered the proof of C–H···O hydrogen bonding in methanesulfonyl fluoride.

== Honours ==
The Department of Chemical and Physical Sciences at the University of Toronto Mississauga hosts a lecture series named in honour of Robinson called the E. A. Robinson Science Education Lectureship.

The University of Toronto Mississauga also gives out two awards in his honour: the E. A. Robinson Teaching Excellence Award for Senior Faculty, for distinguished undergraduate instructors, and the E. A. Robinson Medal, for the top graduating student in each of the four major disciplines at the campus.
