= Charlotte Schreiber =

Canadian artist

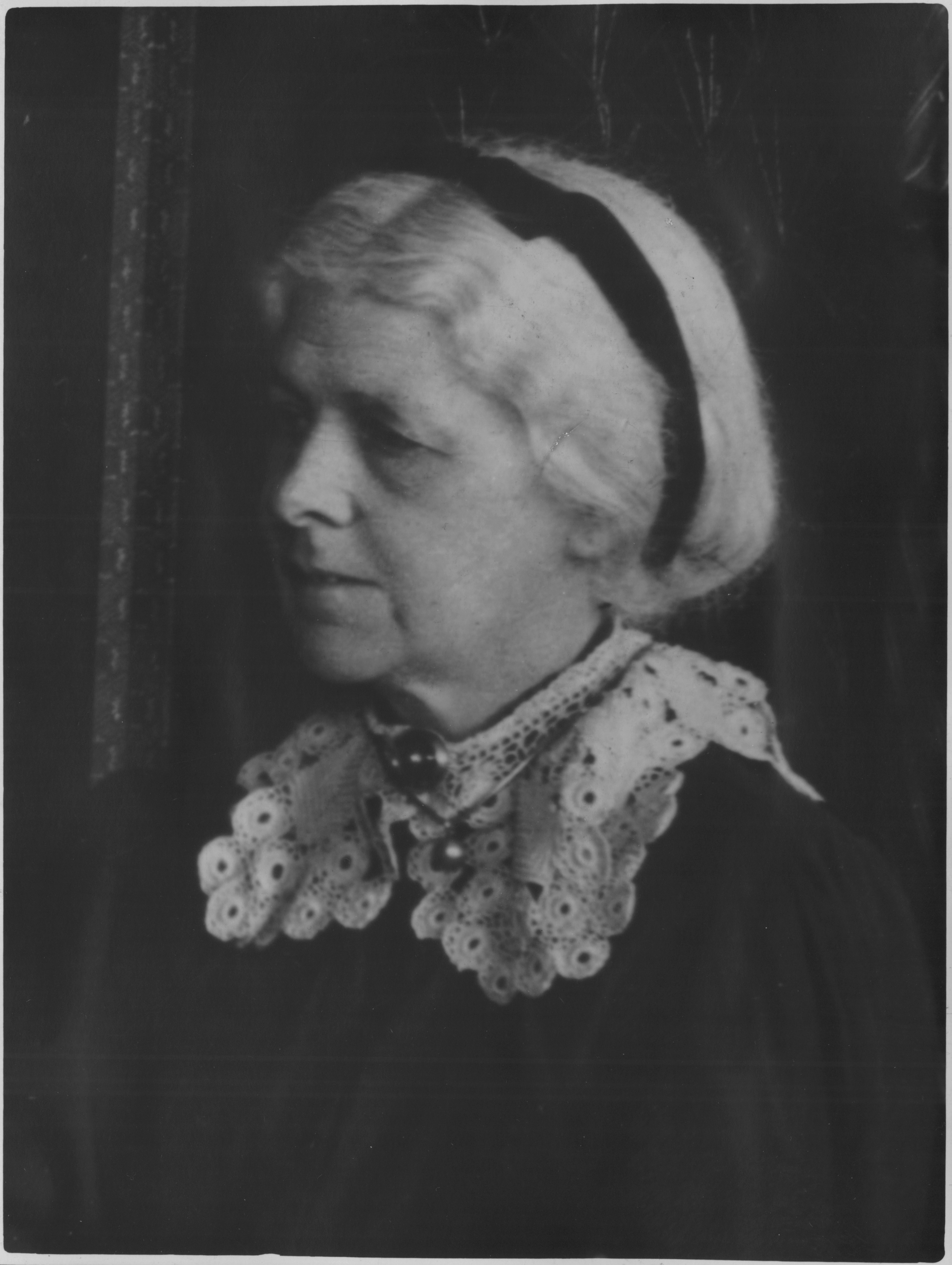
- Born: Charlotte Mount Brock Morrell; 21 May 1834; Woodham Mortimer, Essex, United Kingdom
- Died: 3 July 1922 (aged 88); Paignton, Devon, United Kingdom
- Known for: Painting
- Spouse: Weymouth George Schreiber

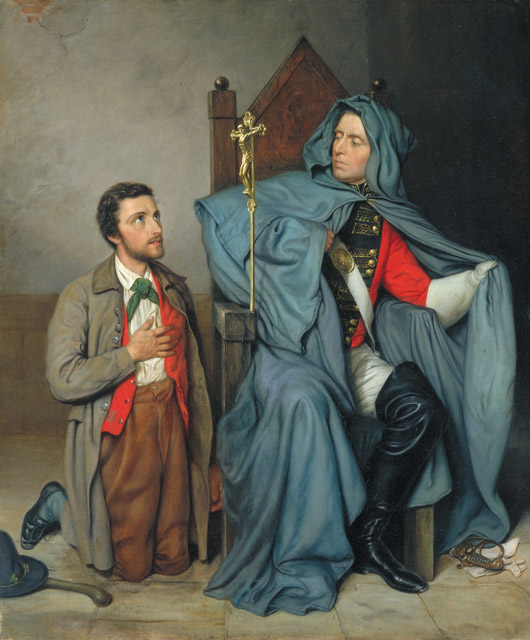
Charlotte Schreiber, The Croppy Boy (The Confession of an Irish Patriot) (1879). Oil on canvas. 91.6 × 76.2 cm. National Gallery of Canada

Charlotte Mount Brock Schreiber RCA (21 May 1834 – 3 July 1922) was an English-Canadian painter and illustrator, among the first of Canada's notable female painters.

== Early life ==
Schreiber, née Morrell, second cousin of Sir Isaac Brock, the hero of the War of 1812, was born in Colchester, Essex, England. Before marrying and emigrating to Canada in 1875, she studied and found success in her native country. At Mr. Carey's School of Art in London, she trained with John Rogers Herbert, R.A., who specialized in historical paintings and portraits. She also studied anatomy and acquired a great understanding and appreciation for the human form: she wrote in 1895,

"The human hand, the finger nail, the foot, every portion of the living body, the parts of a flower, are divinely beautiful … it is a joy to paint them as they are in reality".

Equipped with this training, Schreiber achieved professional success early in her career, exhibiting at the Royal Academy of Art at the age of 21 and receiving commissions to illustrate several books, Edmund Spenser's Legend of the Knight of the Red Crosse or of Holinesse (1871) and Elizabeth Barrett Browning's Rhyme of the Duchess May (1873), both published by Sampson Low, Son & Marston in London.

In 1875, she married her cousin Weymouth Schreiber and moved to Canada with him and his three children, settling near Toronto in what is now the city of Mississauga. Her family built an estate of three homes: Mount Woodham, Iverholme, and Lislehurst, upon land gifted by Sir Isaac Brock that is today the location of the University of Toronto Mississauga.

== Toronto ==
Schreiber quickly got involved in the Toronto art scene. In 1876, a year after she emigrated, she was elected to the Ontario Society of Artists, and the following year, she became the first woman to teach at the Ontario School of Art, today's OCAD University, where she was also the only woman to serve on the school's council. She also played a role as a founding member of the Women's Art Association of Canada. In 1880, Schreiber became the first woman elected to the Royal Canadian Academy of Arts, which had been strictly and exclusively male until then. However, despite this great achievement, she was not permitted to attend meetings or engage in policy-making, and she remained the only woman on the academy until 1933 (53 years later), when the second woman, Marion Long, was elected.

The National Gallery of Canada holds the painting that she submitted toward her Academy diploma. Titled The Croppy Boy (The Confession of an Irish Patriot), it was based on the Irish ballad "The Croppy Boy", which is set during the Irish Rebellion of 1798. A version of the ballad by William B. McBurney, which first appeared in the Irish newspaper The Nation in 1845, concerns a fictional United Irishmen rebel who stops in a Catholic church on his way to participate in the rebellion. He sees a cloaked figure in a confessional and kneels for the penitential rite. Unbeknownst to him, the figure is actually a yeomanry captain who sought refuge from the rebels by hiding in the confessional. After the youth completes his confession, the officer reveals himself and proceeds to arrest the youth and take him away to be executed. Schreiber's painting shows the youth on his knees, earnestly addressing the cloaked captain, whose uniform is visible to the viewer but not to the penitent. The two figures are united by the red in their clothing, but the captain occupies the shadowy portion of the canvas, with the youth on the lighter side.

== Work ==
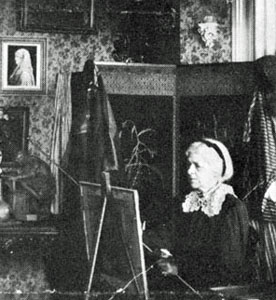
Charlotte M.B. Schreiber, working in her studio at Erindale, Ontario, 1895

Schreiber's contributions to Canadian art are immense. She painted scenes of everyday life, and she based her paintings on the things she saw and the people she knew personally. For instance, her 1876 painting Don't Be Afraid (previously titled Springfield on the Credit) is based on close observation of children playing in the snow on the banks of the Credit River. Because of her insistence and commitment to realism, Schreiber is credited with introducing the realist style to Canada. Further, her experience in England allowed her to carry over European stylistic changes in art to Canada, leading directly to the country's artistic maturity. Schreiber's work epitomized the realist movement through the influence of both neoclassicism and romanticism. This can be seen in her Portrait of Edith Quinn, showcasing the naturalism portrayed in contemporary literature while maintaining a detailed, realistic portrayal of the subject.

Her art was influenced by literature, including her early illustrations of poems by Chaucer (The Legende of the Knight of the Red Crosse), Edmund Spenser (The Faerie Queene, illustrated 1871), and Elizabeth Barrett Browning (The Rhyme of the Duchess May, 1874).

== Later years ==
After a long and successful career in Canada, Schreiber moved back to England in 1898 after the death of her husband, and she died in Paignton, South Devon, England in 1922.

== Record sale prices ==
At the Cowley Abbott Auction, Important Canadian Art (Sale 2) December 1, 2022, lot #131, Edith Schreiber with her Sleigh, oil on board, 12.25 x 9.25 ins ( 31.1 x 23.5 cms ), Auction Estimate: $10,000.00 - $15,000.00, realized a price $138,000.00.

At the Cowley Abbott Auction of An Important Private Collection of Canadian Art – Part III, December 6, 2023, lot Lot #131, Schreiber's Don’t Be Afraid, oil on canvas, 32.25 x 43 ins ( 81.9 x 109.2 cms ), Auction Estimate: $100,000.00 - $150,000.00,, realized a price of $624,000.00.
