= John Tuzo Wilson =

Canadian geologist and professor (1908–1993)

John Tuzo Wilson CC OBE FRS FRSE FRSC
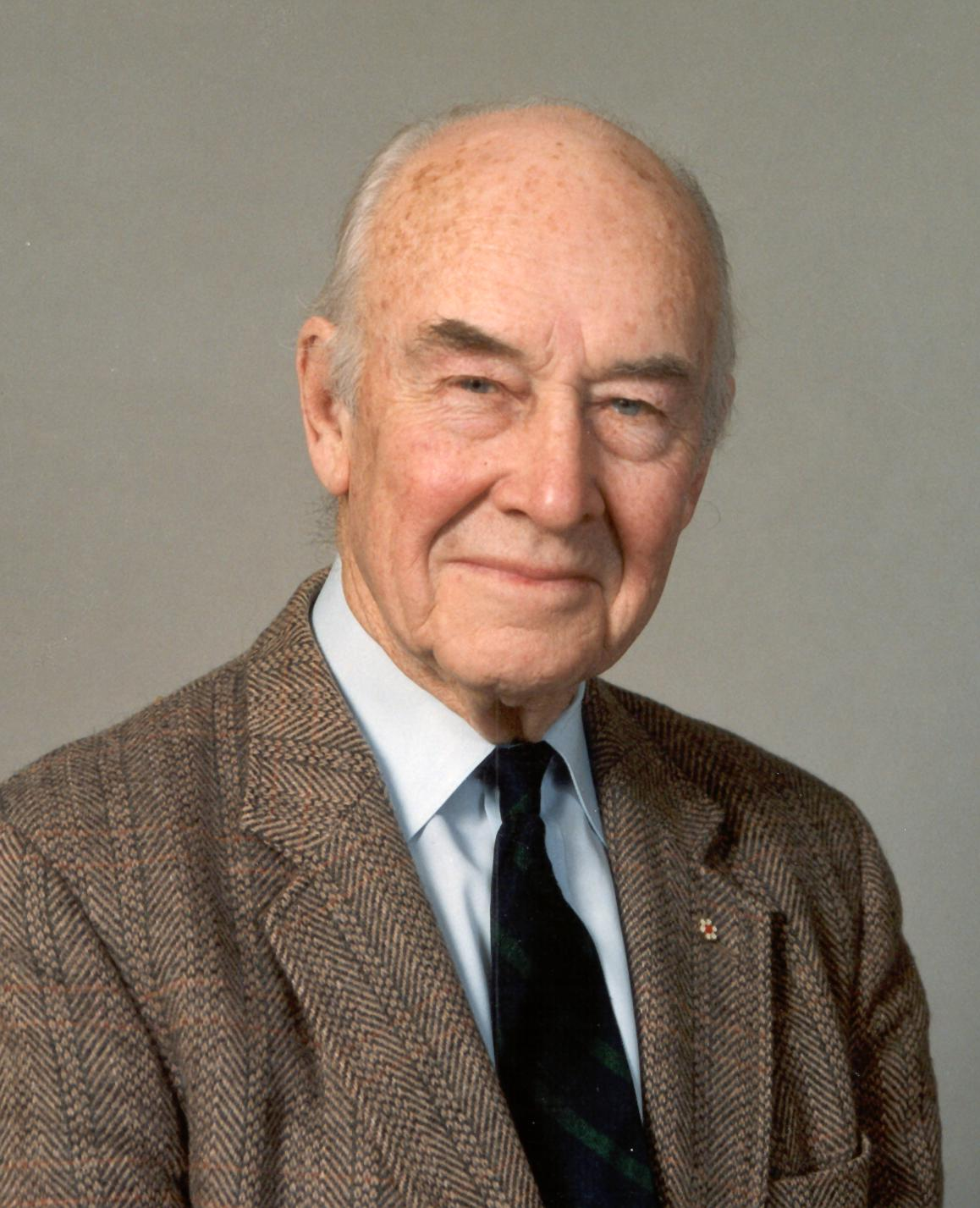
- John Tuzo Wilson in 1992

6th Chancellor of York University
- In office 1983–1986
- Preceded by: John S. Proctor
- Succeeded by: Larry Clarke

2nd Principal of Erindale College, Toronto
- In office 1968–1974
- Preceded by: David Carlton Williams
- Succeeded by: E. A. Robinson

Personal details
- Born: October 24, 1908 Ottawa, Ontario, Canada
- Died: April 15, 1993 (aged 84) Toronto, Ontario, Canada
- Education: University of Toronto (BA); St John's College, Cambridge (BA, ScD); Princeton University (PhD)
- Known for: Theory of plate tectonics
- Scientific career
- Awards: Officer, Order of Canada; Companion, Order of Canada; Fellow, Royal Society of Canada; Fellow, Royal Society of London; Fellow, Royal Society of Edinburgh; Legion of Merit; Order of the British Empire; Maurice Ewing Medal, AGU; Maurice Ewing Medal, SEG; Bucher Medal, SEG; Penrose Medal, GSA; Wegener Medal, EUG; Wollaston Medal, Geological Society; Vetlesen Prize, Columbia University; Canada Centennial Medal; 125th Anniversary Medal (Canada) John J. Carty Award (1975)
- Fields: Geophysics, geology
- Workplaces: University of Toronto Mississauga
- Thesis: The Geology of the Mill Creek – Stillwater Area, Montana (1936)
- Doctoral advisor: William Taylor Thom, Jr
- Doctoral students: Harold Williams

John Tuzo Wilson (October 24, 1908 – April 15, 1993) was a Canadian geophysicist, geologist and professor at the University of Toronto Mississauga who achieved worldwide acclaim for his contributions to the theory of plate tectonics. He added the concept of hot spots, a volcanic region hotter than the surrounding mantle (as in the Hawaii hotspot). He also conceived of the transform fault, a major plate boundary where two plates move past each other horizontally (e.g., the San Andreas Fault).

His name was given to two young Canadian submarine volcanoes called the Tuzo Wilson Seamounts. The Wilson cycle of seabed expansion and contraction (associated with the Supercontinent cycle) bears his 67. One of the two large low-shear-velocity provinces was given the name Tuzo after him, the other being named Jason after W. Jason Morgan, who furthered Wilson's work into plume theory.

Wilson served as the second principal of Erindale College at the University of Toronto from 1968 to 1974.

== Early life and education ==
Wilson was born in Ottawa on October 24, 1908, the son of John Armistead Wilson CBE, and his wife, Henrietta Tuzo. Wilson's father was of Scottish descent and his mother was a third-generation Canadian of French descent.

He became one of the first people in Canada to receive a degree in geophysics, graduating from Trinity College at the University of Toronto in 1930. He obtained a second (BA) degree from St John's College, Cambridge in 1932 and then a doctorate (ScD). He then pursued further graduate studies as Princeton University, where he received a Ph.D. in geology in 1936 after completing a doctoral dissertation titled "The Geology of the Mill Creek – Stillwater Area, Montana."

== Career ==
In 1936, Wilson joined the Geological Survey of Canada as a government geologist. This was interrupted by the Second World War during which he served with the Royal Canadian Engineers, serving in Europe and reaching the rank of Colonel. He was involved in Operation Musk Ox. For his wartime service, he was appointed an OBE.

In 1946 he was appointed the first Professor of Geophysics at the University of Toronto.

He made significant contributions to the theory of plate tectonics, adding a concept of hot spots, hot region beneath the crust. Plate tectonics is the scientific theory that the rigid outer layers of the Earth (crust and part of the upper mantle), the lithosphere, is broken up into around 13 pieces or "plates" that move independently over the weaker asthenosphere. Wilson maintained that the Hawaiian Islands were created as a tectonic plate (extending across much of the Pacific Ocean) shifted to the northwest over a fixed hot spot, spawning a long series of volcanoes. He also conceived of the transform fault, a major plate boundary where two plates move past each other horizontally (e.g., the San Andreas Fault).

The Wilson cycle of seabed expansion and contraction (associated with the Supercontinent cycle) bears his name, in recognition of his iconic observation that the present-day Atlantic Ocean appears along a former suture zone and his development in a classic 1968 paper of what was later named the "Wilson cycle" in 1975 by Kevin C. A. Burke, a colleague and friend of Wilson.

His name was given to two young Canadian submarine volcanoes called the Tuzo Wilson Seamounts.

Wilson was president (1957–1960) of the International Union of Geodesy and Geophysics (IUGG).

In 1968 he became the second campus principal of the University of Toronto's Erindale College, now known as the University of Toronto Mississauga. Wilson is perhaps the most notable of UTM's principals, as his time in office influenced the early development of the campus, which was formally established in 1967. In 1974 he left to become the Director General of the Ontario Science Centre and passed the role of principal to E. A. Robinson. In 1983 he became Chancellor of York University, Toronto.

He was the host of the television series The Planet of Man.

== Honours and awards ==
For his service during the Second World War, Wilson was appointed an Officer of the Order of the British Empire in 1946. In 1969, he was made an Officer of the Order of Canada and was promoted to the rank of Companion of that order in 1974. He was elected to the American Academy of Arts and Sciences in 1971 and the American Philosophical Society in 1971. Wilson was awarded the John J. Carty Award from the National Academy of Sciences, of which he was already a member, in 1975. In 1978, he was awarded the Wollaston Medal of the Geological Society of London and a gold medal by the Royal Canadian Geographical Society. He also served as honorary vice president of the RCGS. He was a Fellow of the Royal Society, the Royal Society of Canada, and of the Royal Society of Edinburgh.

He was elected president-elect (1978–1980) and president (1980–1982) of the American Geophysical Union. He also served as the director general of the Ontario Science Centre from 1974 to 1985.

Wilson and his plate tectonic theory are commemorated on the grounds of the centre by a giant "immovable" spike that records the amount of plate movement since Wilson's birth.

The J. Tuzo Wilson Medal of the Canadian Geophysical Union recognizes achievements in geophysics. He is also commemorated by a named memorial professorship and an eponymous annual public lecture delivered at the University of Toronto. The J. Tuzo Wilson Research Wing of the William G. Davis Building at the University of Toronto Mississauga is named in his honour.

He is one of the 2016 inductees into Legends Row: Mississauga Walk of Fame.

== Personal life ==
=== Photography ===
Wilson was an avid traveller and took a large number of photographs during his travels to many destinations, including European countries, parts of the then USSR, China, the southern Pacific, Africa, and to both polar regions. Although many of his photos are geological—details of rocks and their structures or panoramas of large formations—the bulk of his photos are of the places, activities and people that he saw on his travels: landscapes, city views, monuments, sites, instruments, vehicles, flora and fauna, occupations and people.

=== Family ===
In 1938 he married Isabel Jean Dickson.

He retired in 1986 and died in Toronto on April 15, 1993.

== Selected publications ==
- One Chinese Moon (1959)
- Wilson, Tuzo (July 14, 1962). "Cabot Fault, An Appalachian Equivalent of the San Andreas and Great Glen Faults and some Implications for Continental Displacement". Nature. 195 (4837): 135–138. Bibcode:1962Natur.195..135W. doi:10.1038/195135a0. S2CID 4289725.
- Wilson, J. Tuzo (February 9, 1963). "Evidence from Islands on the Spreading of Ocean Floors". Nature. 197 (4867): 536–538. Bibcode:1963Natur.197..536W. doi:10.1038/197536a0. S2CID 4255932.
- Wilson, J. Tuzo (1963). "A Possible Origin of the Hawaiian Islands" (PDF). Canadian Journal of Physics. 41 (6): 863–870. Bibcode:1963CaJPh..41..863W. doi:10.1139/p63-094.
- Wilson, J. Tuzo (July 24, 1965). "A new Class of Faults and their Bearing on Continental Drift". Nature. 207 (4995): 343–347. Bibcode:1965Natur.207..343W. doi:10.1038/207343a0. S2CID 4294401.
- Vine, F. J.; Wilson, J. Tuzo (October 22, 1965). "Magnetic Anomalies over a Young Oceanic Ridge off Vancouver Island". Science. 150 (3695): 485–9. Bibcode:1965Sci...150..485V. doi:10.1126/science.150.3695.485. PMID 17842754. S2CID 41107379.
- Wilson, J. Tuzo (August 13, 1966). "Did the Atlantic close and then re-open?". Nature. 211 (5050): 676–681. Bibcode:1966Natur.211..676W. doi:10.1038/211676a0. S2CID 4226266.
- Wilson, J. Tuzo (1966). "Are the structures of the Caribbean and Scotia arc regions analogous to ice rafting?". Earth and Planetary Science Letters. 1 (5): 335–338. Bibcode:1966E&PSL...1..335T. doi:10.1016/0012-821X(66)90019-7.
- Wilson, J. Tuzo (December 1968). "A Revolution in Earth Science". Geotimes. 13 (10). Washington DC: 10–16.
- Wilson, J. Tuzo (1971). "Du Toit, Alexander Logie". Dictionary of Scientific Biography. Vol. 4. pp. 261–263.

== See also ==
- List of geophysicists
- Science and technology in Canada

Academic offices
Preceded by David Carlton Williams	Principal of Erindale College, Toronto; 1967–1974	Succeeded by E. A. Robinson
Preceded by John S. Proctor	Chancellor of York University; 1983–1986	Succeeded by Larry Clarke
Professional and academic associations
Preceded by Henry Duckworth	President of the Royal Society of Canada; 1972–1973	Succeeded by Guy Sylvestre
Professional and academic associations
Preceded by Office established	President of the Canadian Geophysical Union; 1974–1975	Succeeded by Denis Ian Gough
