= Mahinārangi Tocker =

New Zealand singer-songwriter

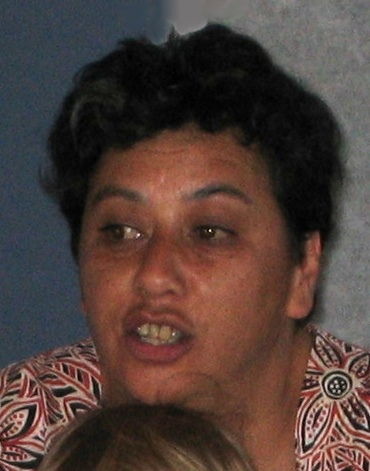
- Tocker at the 2007 Auckland Folk Festival

Background information
- Born: 1955
- Died: 15 April 2008 (aged 52–53)
- Occupations: Singer; songwriter
- Years active: 1985–2008

Mahinārangi Tocker MNZM (1955 – 15 April 2008) was a singer-songwriter from New Zealand. Tocker wrote more than 600 songs in a 25-year career in the jazz fusion folk-pop genre. Her vocal style has been compared to that of Joan Armatrading and Tracy Chapman. She also gave lectures around New Zealand about the use of music and creativity to boost learning and self-esteem, and was an adult literacy tutor, writer and poet.

== Biography ==
Tocker was born in Taumarunui to Rihitapuwai Rauhihi and Norman Tocker and was of Ngāti Raukawa, Ngāti Tūwharetoa, Ngāti Maniapoto, Jewish and Celtic ancestry. Tocker spent much of her life at Glendene in West Auckland.

In the 2008 New Year Honours, Tocker was appointed a Member of the New Zealand Order of Merit for services to music.

Tocker died on 15 April 2008 in Auckland's North Shore hospital following a severe asthma attack. She was 52. Her final performance had been at the Titirangi Festival of Music in March 2008. A memorial tree was planted for her at Falls Park in Henderson.

== Personal life ==
Tocker had a daughter in 1982. Tocker came out openly as a lesbian. She openly talked about her diagnosis with bipolar disorder.

== Discography ==
Albums

- 1985 Clothesline Conversation
- 1987 I'm Going Home
- 1996 Mahinarangi
- 1997 Te Ripo
- 2002 Hei Ha!
- 2002 Touring (With Charlotte Yates)
- 2005 The Mongrel in Me
