= List of provosts of the University of Toronto =

The vice-president and provost of the University of Toronto is the senior officer responsible for academic and budgetary matters. The various deans of the university's academic divisions report to the provost, and the dean of the School of Graduate Studies is vice-provost of graduate research and education. As a vice-president, the provost reports to the president of the University of Toronto.

The current officeholder is L. Trevor Young, former dean of the Temerty Faculty of Medicine who has served as vice-president and provost since January 1, 2024.

== Provosts ==
The following is a list of provosts of the University of Toronto.

No.	Picture	Name	Took office	Left office
1		Moffat St. Andrew Woodside	1965	1969
2		John H. Sword	1969	1971
3		Donald Forster	1971	1975
4		Donald Chant	1975	1980
5		David Strangway	1980	1983
6		Frank Iacobucci	1983	1985
7		Joan Foley	1986	1993
8		Adel Sedra	1993	2002
9		Shirley Neuman	2002	2004
10		Vivek Goel	2004	2009
11		Cheryl Misak	2009	2013
12		Cheryl Regehr	2013	2021
12		Cheryl Regehr	2022	2024
acting		L. Trevor Young	July 2021	December 2021
13		L. Trevor Young	January 1, 2024	incumbent

== See also ==
- List of presidents of the University of Toronto
- List of principals of the University of Toronto Mississauga
- List of principals of the University of Toronto Scarborough
