= L. Trevor Young =

Canadian psychiatrist and academic administrator

L. Trevor Young FCAHS

13th Vice-President and Provost of the University of Toronto
- Incumbent
- Assumed office January 1, 2024
- President: Meric Gertler; Melanie Woodin
- Preceded by: Cheryl Regehr
- Acting; July 2021 – December 2021

Dean of the Temerty Faculty of Medicine
- In office January 1, 2015 – August 31, 2023
- Preceded by: Catharine Whiteside
- Succeeded by: Patricia Houston (interim)

Personal details
- Education: University of Manitoba (MD); University of Toronto (PhD)
- Medical career
- Field: Psychiatry
- Institutions: University of Toronto; Centre for Addiction and Mental Health

Lionel Trevor Young is a Canadian psychiatrist and academic administrator who has served as the 13th vice-president and provost of the University of Toronto since 2024.

Young is a professor in the departments of psychiatry, and pharmacology and toxicology in the Temerty Faculty of Medicine where he previously served as dean from 2015 to 2023. He is also a senior scientist at the Centre for Addiction and Mental Health (CAMH) and its former physician-in-chief.

== Life and career ==
Young acquired his MD from the University of Manitoba in 1983 and completed residency training at the University of Toronto. Following a research fellowship at the Johns Hopkins School of Medicine, he earned his PhD from the Institute of Medical Science at the University of Toronto in 1995.

He was a professor in the department of psychiatry and behavioural neurosciences at McMaster University, head of the department of psychiatry at the University of British Columbia, and chair of the department of psychiatry at the University of Toronto.

Young was appointed dean of the Temerty Faculty of Medicine on January 1, 2015, and held the office until August 31, 2023, concurrently serving as the University of Toronto's Vice-Provost, Relations with Health Care Institutions.

From July to December 2021, he was interim vice-president and provost at U of T, filling in for Cheryl Regehr. He was officially appointed U of T's 13th provost on January 1, 2024.

== Awards and honours ==
Young received a Psychiatric Services Gold Achievement Award from the American Psychiatric Association for a mood disorders clinical program at Hamilton Psychiatric Hospital. He received the Colvin Prize for Outstanding Achievement in Mood Disorders Research in 2015. In 2013, he was the recipient of the Canadian College of Neuropsychopharmacology Medal. Young is also a Fellow of the Canadian Academy of Health Sciences.
