= List of principals of the University of Toronto Scarborough =

The University of Toronto Scarborough, one of the three campuses of the University of Toronto, has had 12 principals since it was established in 1964 as Scarborough College. The current officeholder is Linda Johnston, who has served as the vice-president and principal since January 1, 2024.

Abbreviated as "VP-principal" or "VPP," the vice-president/principal is the executive head of the Scarborough campus. The VP-principal is also an ex-officio member of the UTSC Campus Council, an arm of the University of Toronto Governing Council.

Since 2003, the principal of the Scarborough campus has had a dual role as a vice-president of the University of Toronto, following a reorganization of the campus's administrative structure in anticipation of student enrolment growth in the early 2000s. The vice-president reports directly to the president of the University of Toronto.

The first Scarborough principal was D. Carlton Williams, a professor of psychology at the University of Toronto who, in 1964, was tasked with leading the establishment of both the university's Erindale and Scarborough campuses.

== Principals ==
No.	Image	Name	Took office	Left office
Principal of Scarborough College (1964–1996)
1		D. Carlton Williams	1964	1965
2		A. F. Wynne Plumptre	1965	1972
3		D. Ralph Campbell	1972	1976
4		Albert Derrick Allen	1976	1976
5		Joan Foley	1976	1980
5		Joan Foley	1981	1984
acting		Joan Foley	1999	2000
acting		John S. Colman	1980	1981
6		George Ronald Williams	1984	1989
Principal of the University of Toronto at Scarborough (1996–2003)
7		Paul R. Thompson	1989	2003
Vice-president of the University of Toronto, Principal of the University of Toronto at Scarborough (2003–2006)
interim		John Youson	2003	2004
Vice-president of the University of Toronto, Principal of the University of Toronto Scarborough (2006–present)
8		Kwong-loi Shun	2004	2006
9		Franco Vaccarino	2007	2014
interim		Bruce Kidd	2014	2015
10		Bruce Kidd	2015	2018
11		Wisdom J. Tettey	2018	2024
acting		Linda Johnston	2024	2025
12		Linda Johnston	2025	incumbent

== See also ==
- List of principals of the University of Toronto Mississauga
- List of provosts of the University of Toronto
