= Hei Ha! =

Studio album by Mahinarangi Tocker
- Released: 2002
- Label: Jayrem Music

Mahinarangi Tocker chronology
Lyrics Without Melody (2000)	Hei Ha! (2002)	Touring (2002)

Hei Ha! is a 2002 album by New Zealand singer Mahinarangi Tocker. The songs were written by Tocker, with the exceptions of Raukawa, Takiri and Ko Te Nau Pararahi which are traditional songs, while Nga Hau E Wha and I'll Breathe You were co-written with David Downes.

== Track listing ==
1. "E Te Matua" – 0:58
2. "Raukawa" – 0:48
3. "Nga Hau E Wha" – 0:43
4. "When I Grow Up" – 3:34
5. "A Woman Who Feels Nothing" – 3:22
6. "Kei Hea Koe" – 3:42
7. "Tender" – 2:08
8. "To Beat With Her Heart" – 4:13
9. "Takiri" – 1:05
10. "Forever" – 5:16
11. "Danger Kissing" – 3:33
12. "Maggie Goodbye" – 3:57
13. "Ko Te Nau Pararahi" – 0:58
14. "Holy Laws" – 0:43
15. "Where Do We Grow To?" – 4:37
16. "I'll Breathe For You" – 4:19
