= Cheryl Misak =

Canadian philosopher (born 1961)

Cheryl Misak FRSC

11th Vice-President and Provost of the University of Toronto
- In office 2009–2013
- President: David Naylor
- Preceded by: Vivek Goel
- Succeeded by: Cheryl Regehr

Vice-President and Principal of the University of Toronto Mississauga
- Acting; 2006–2007
- President: David Naylor
- Preceded by: Ian Orchard
- Succeeded by: Ian Orchard

Vice-Principal (Academic) and Dean of the University of Toronto at Mississauga
- In office 2003–2005
- Principal: Ian Orchard
- Preceded by: E. A. Robinson
- Succeeded by: Charles Jones (acting)

Personal details
- Born: Cheryl Jayne Misak; July 16, 1961 Lethbridge, Alberta, Canada
- Education: University of Lethbridge (BA); Columbia University (MA); University of Oxford (PhD)
- Scientific career
- Fields: Pragmatism; analytic philosophy; bioethics
- Workplaces: University of Toronto

Cheryl Jayne Misak (born July 16, 1961) is a Canadian philosopher and academic administrator who works in pragmatism, the history of analytic philosophy, and bioethics. She is a university professor at the University of Toronto, a Fellow of the Royal Society of Canada, and a recipient of a Guggenheim Fellowship in intellectual and cultural history.

From 2003 to 2005, Misak served as vice-principal (academic) and dean of the University of Toronto Mississauga and as acting vice-president and principal of the campus from 2006 to 2007. She was vice-president and provost of the University of Toronto from 2009 to 2013 and is appointed as a professor in the Faculty of Arts and Science's Department of Philosophy. She was also president of the Charles S. Peirce Society in 2011. From December 2020 until October 2021, Misak served as the interim director of the Munk School of Global Affairs and Public Policy at the University of Toronto.

Misak was raised in Lethbridge, Alberta. She received her BA from the University of Lethbridge, her MA from Columbia University, and her DPhil from the University of Oxford.

== Publications ==
=== Authored books ===
- Misak, Cheryl J. (2025). Oxford Pragmatism: Ryle and Austin's Debt. Oxford University Press. ISBN 978-0-19-887588-8. OCLC 1521405046.
- Misak, Cheryl J. (2020). Frank Ramsey: A Sheer Excess of Powers. Oxford University Press. ISBN 978-0-19-875535-7. OCLC 1102642049.
- Misak, Cheryl J. (October 18, 2016). Cambridge Pragmatism: From Peirce and James to Ramsey and Wittgenstein. Oxford University Press. ISBN 978-0-19-102004-9. OCLC 957738331.
- Misak, Cheryl J. (2013). The American Pragmatists. Oxford University Press. ISBN 978-0-19-165138-0. OCLC 828143682.
- Misak, Cheryl J. (2000). Truth, Politics, Morality: Pragmatism and Deliberation. Routledge. ISBN 978-0-203-16228-6. OCLC 179161004.
- Misak, Cheryl J. (1995) Verificationism: Its History and Prospects (Philosophical Issues in Science). Routledge. ISBN 0-415-12597-9.
- Misak, Cheryl J. (2004). Truth and the End of Inquiry: A Peircean Account of Truth. Oxford University Press. ISBN 978-0-19-151963-5. OCLC 370946282.

=== Edited books ===
- Misak, Cheryl; Price, Huw, eds. (2017). The Practical Turn: Pragmatism in Britain in the Long Twentieth Century. The British Academy
- Misak, Cheryl, ed. (2008). The Oxford Handbook of American Philosophy. Oxford University Press.
- Misak, Cheryl, ed. (2007). New Pragmatists. Oxford University Press.
- Misak, Cheryl, ed. (July 12, 2004). The Cambridge Companion to Peirce. Cambridge University Press. doi:10.1017/ccol0521570069. ISBN 978-0-521-57006-0.

=== Selected papers ===
- Misak, Cheryl (August 2005). "ICU Psychosis and Patient Autonomy: Some Thoughts from the Inside". The Journal of Medicine and Philosophy. 30 (4): 411–430. doi:10.1080/03605310591008603. ISSN 0360-5310. PMID 16029990.
