= Catharine Whiteside =

Canadian medical researcher

Catharine Whiteside CM FRCPC FCAHS

Dean of the University of Toronto Faculty of Medicine
- In office 2006–2014
- Preceded by: David Naylor
- Succeeded by: L. Trevor Young

Personal details
- Education: University of Toronto
- Scientific career
- Organization(s): Diabetes Action Canada; University of Toronto
- Known for: Diabetes Research; Medical Leadership
- Awards: Member of the Order of Canada; Kidney Foundation of Canada Medal for Research Excellence
- Fields: Nephrology
- Thesis: Glomerular and Postglomerular Capillary Permselectivity in The Dog Kidney (1984)

Catharine Isobel Whiteside is a Canadian physician and medical researcher. She is Director, Strategic Partnerships of Diabetes Action Canada and Chair of the board of the Banting Research Foundation. Whiteside is the former Dean of the Faculty of Medicine at the University of Toronto.

== Education ==
- 1972 BSc Victoria College (University of Toronto)
- 1975 MD University of Toronto
- 1984 PhD University of Toronto

== Medical career ==
Whiteside obtained her MD from the University of Toronto (U of T) with certifications in internal medicine and nephrology. Whiteside provides leadership in continuing health education, focused on inter-professional teamwork and patient-centred practice.

Whiteside was appointed Director of the Cinician Scientist Training Program at U of T in 1997. Whiteside was graduate coordinator for the Institute of Medical Sciences (IMS) at U of T. In 2003, IMS established the annual Whiteside award in her honour to be presented to a recently graduated MSc student who had made outstanding scholarly contributions.

Whiteside was Dean of Medicine at the University of Toronto from 2006-2014. She is a founding member and former president of the Canadian Academy of Health Sciences.

Whiteside was Executive Director of Diabetes Action Canada from 2016-2021. As Director of the CIHR Strategic Patient-Oriented Research Network for Diabetes and Related Complications, she stated that "Our mission is to improve patient experience, population outcomes and health professional experience, and to reduce health care costs related to diabetes". In 2022 she became Director, Strategic Partnerships for Diabetes Action Canada. Whiteside joined the Board of Directors of Scarborough Health Network in 2022.

== Research ==
Whiteside conducted doctoral research on kidney physiology. Her subsequent research examined the effect of diabetes and glucose levels on the interactions of glomerular cells during injury and healing. The glomerular filtration barrier forms the primary filter in the kidneys, but damage to the epithelial glomerular tissue and the endothelial podocytes are common in diabetic nephropathy. This damage affects the kidneys' ability to remove waste products and extract fluid from the body.

Whiteside’s research suggests that early damage to the kidney from high glucose occurs through increased levels of reactive oxygen species (ROS). ROS generation may be a consequence of activation of the polyol pathway and is amplified by protein kinase C (PKC) signalling. PKC activation increases the level of growth factors that contribute to the pathogenesis of diabetic nephropathy, including disassembly of F-actin stress fibres in glomerular mesangial cells.

Whiteside studies potential therapeutic mechanisms to reduce the effect of diabetic nephropathies.

Whiteside also studies the management of health sciences in academia.

== Awards and distinctions ==
- 2007 Kidney Foundation of Canada Medal for Research Excellence
- 2009 Canadian Medical Association May Cohen Award for Women Mentors
- 2015 Fellow of the Royal College of Physicians and Surgeons of Canada
- 2016 Member of the Order of Canada
- 2016 Ontario Medical Association Advocate for Students and Residents Award
