= Lady Franklin's Lament =

Traditional song

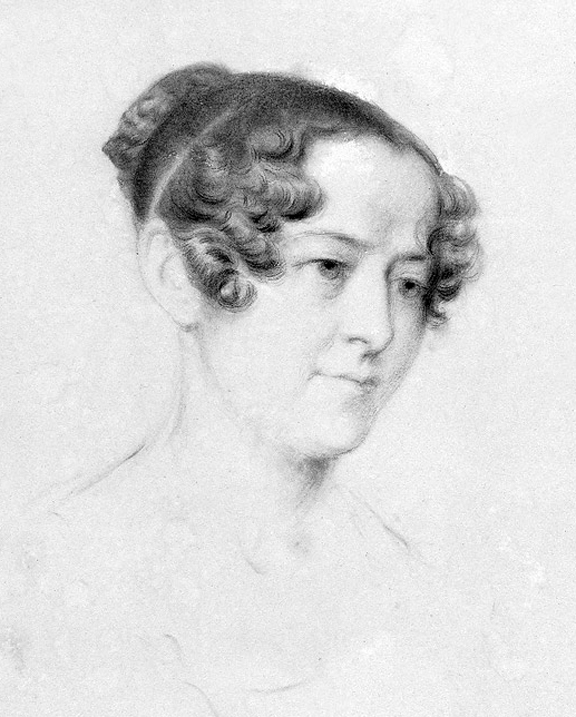
Portrait of Lady Jane Franklin by Thomas Bock, 1838

"Lady Franklin's Lament" (also known as "Lord Franklin" and "The Sailor's Dream") is a traditional folk ballad indexed by George Malcolm Laws (Laws K09) and Steve Roud (Roud 487). The song recounts the story of a sailor who dreams about Lady Franklin speaking of the loss of her husband, Sir John Franklin, who disappeared in Baffin Bay during his 1845 expedition through the Arctic Ocean in search of the Northwest Passage sea route to the Pacific Ocean. The song first appeared as a Broadside ballad around 1850 and has since been recorded with the melody of the Irish traditional air "Cailín Óg a Stór" by numerous artists. It has been found in Ireland, in Scotland, and in some regions of Canada.

== Composition ==
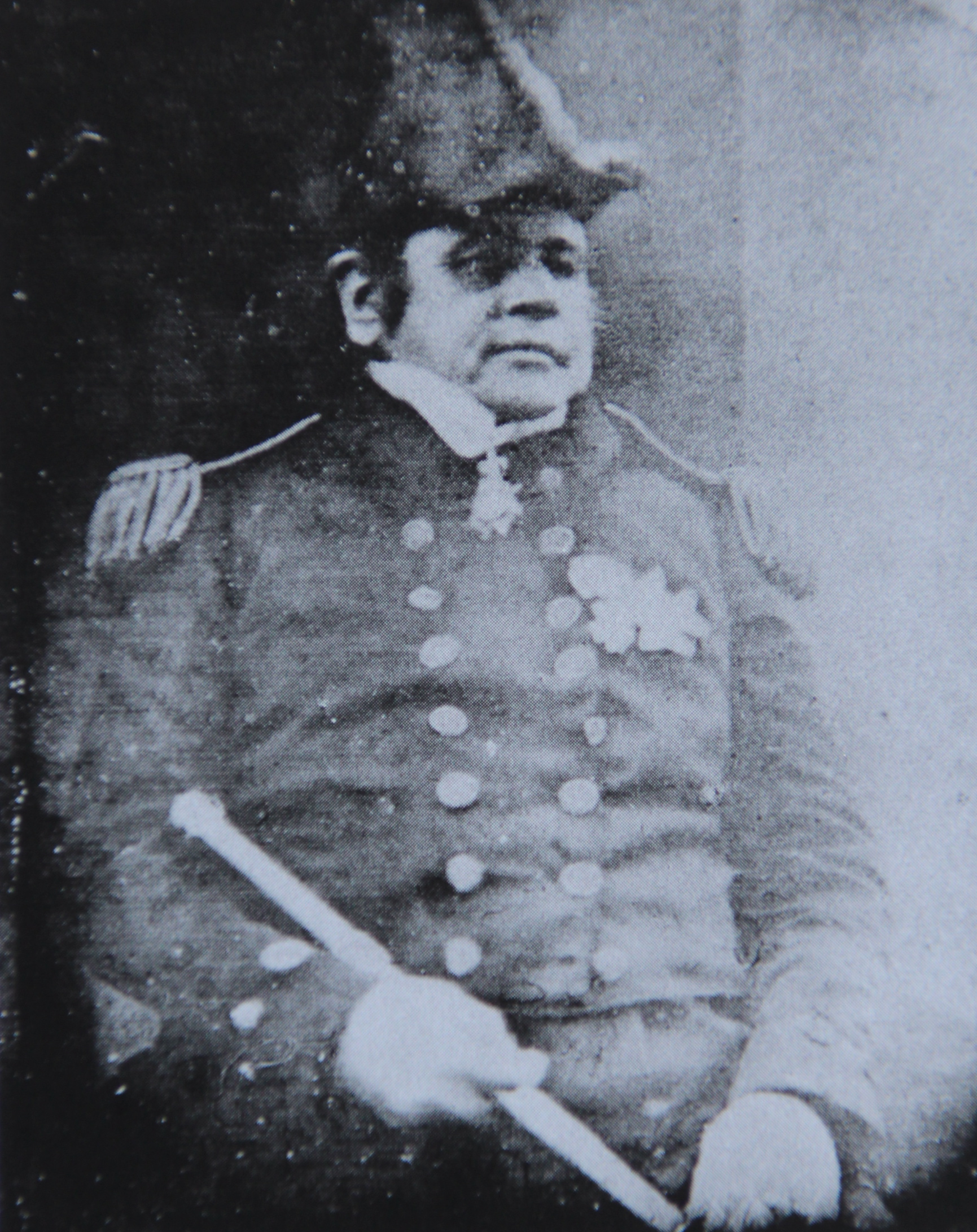
Daguerreotype photograph of Sir John Franklin taken by Richard Beard in 1845, prior to the expedition's departure.

The song consists of five verses using the AABB rhyme scheme. The song is told from the perspective of a sailor on board a ship. He tells of a dream he had of Lady Jane Franklin speaking of the loss of her husband, Sir John Franklin, who disappeared in Baffin Bay during his 1845 expedition through the Arctic Ocean in search of a Northwest Passage sea route to the Pacific Ocean. Following his disappearance, Lady Franklin sponsored seven expeditions to find some trace of her husband. Through her sponsorship, influence, and offering of sizeable rewards, she supported numerous other searches. Her efforts brought great publicity to the expedition's fate. In 1854, Scottish explorer Dr. John Rae discovered evidence through talking to Inuit hunters, among others that the expedition had wintered in 1845–46 on Beechey Island. The expedition's ships, HMS Terror and HMS Erebus, became trapped in ice off King William Island in September 1846 and never sailed again. According to a note later found on that island, Franklin died there on 11 June 1847. The exact location of his grave remains unknown.

== History ==
"Lady Franklin's Lament" first appeared as a broadside ballad around 1850. Found in Canada, Scotland, and Ireland, the song was first published in 1878 in Eighteen Months on a Greenland Whaler by Joseph P. Faulkner.

The song may have been inspired by the traditional Irish ballad "The Croppy Boy", which is set during the 1798 rising. Versions of that ballad first appeared shortly after the rising sung by street peddlers. Several broadside versions of the ballad were printed. These typically include the phrase "500 Guineas" or "one thousand pounds", and are also sung to the melody of the traditional Irish air "Cailín Óg a Stór". These versions of "The Croppy Boy" may have been the basis for the later ballad, "Lady Franklin's Lament".

The song shares a tune with the traditional air "Cailín Óg a Stór" and other folk songs including versions of "A Sailor's Life".

== Recordings ==
=== Traditional recordings ===
Several field recordings of the ballad were made in Canada, particularly in Nova Scotia and Newfoundland, by collectors such as Edith Fowke, Helen Creighton and Herbert Halpert.

In 1941, Helen Hartness Flanders recorded the song from a man named William Merritt of Ludlow, Maine, USA, who had learnt the song from his Scottish mother; the recording is available online.

Three Scottish recordings were recorded in Whalsay in the Shetland islands in the early 1970s from men who probably either learnt the song at sea or from sailors. These recordings can be heard online courtesy of the University of Edinburgh.

=== Popular recordings ===
"Lady Franklin's Lament" has been recorded by numerous artists. A version was recorded as "Lord Franklin" by Mícheál Ó Domhnaill and Kevin Burke on their album Promenade (1979). Other notable renditions were recorded by Liam Clancy, Pentangle, Martin Carthy, John Renbourn, and Sinéad O'Connor. The Pearlfishers recorded the song on their 2002 album Strange Underworld of the Tall Poppies.

Several variations and adaptations of the song have been recorded, such as a version by the Duncan McFarlane Band, where the chorus of "Northwest Passage" is added to the end. Bob Dylan wrote his own lyrics to the song's melody—from the traditional air "Cailín Óg a Stór"—for his song "Bob Dylan's Dream", which appeared on his 1963 album The Freewheelin' Bob Dylan. In his version, Dylan borrows lyrical ideas from "Lady Franklin's Lament". David Wilcox took a similar approach with his song "Jamie's Secret".

== Lyrics ==
We were homeward bound one night on the deep
Swinging in my hammock I fell asleep
I dreamed a dream and I thought it true
Concerning Franklin and his gallant crew

With a hundred seamen he sailed away
To the frozen ocean in the month of May
To seek a passage around the pole
Where we poor sailors do sometimes go

Through cruel hardships they vainly strove
Their ships on mountains of ice were drove
Only the Eskimo with his skin canoe
Was the only one that ever came through

In Baffin's Bay where the whale fish blow
The fate of Franklin no man may know
The fate of Franklin no tongue can tell
Lord Franklin alone with his sailors do dwell

And now my burden it gives me pain
For my long-lost Franklin I would cross the main
Ten thousand pounds I would freely give
To know on earth, that my Franklin do live

== List of recordings ==
- Angelo Branduardi
- Roy Bailey
- Martin Carthy
- Liam Clancy
- Paul Clayton
- Connie Dover
- Bob Dylan
- Jo Freya
- Nic Jones
- A. L. Lloyd
- John Martyn
- Sinéad O'Connor
- Mícheál Ó Domhnaill and Kevin Burke
- Natalia O'Shea
- Pentangle
- Pearlfishers
- John Renbourn
- Andrew Revkin and David Rothenberg
- Fred Wedlock
- David Wilcox
- Barbara Dickson
- John Smith (folk musician)
