= Bruce Kidd =

Canadian distance runner and professor

Bruce Kidd OC
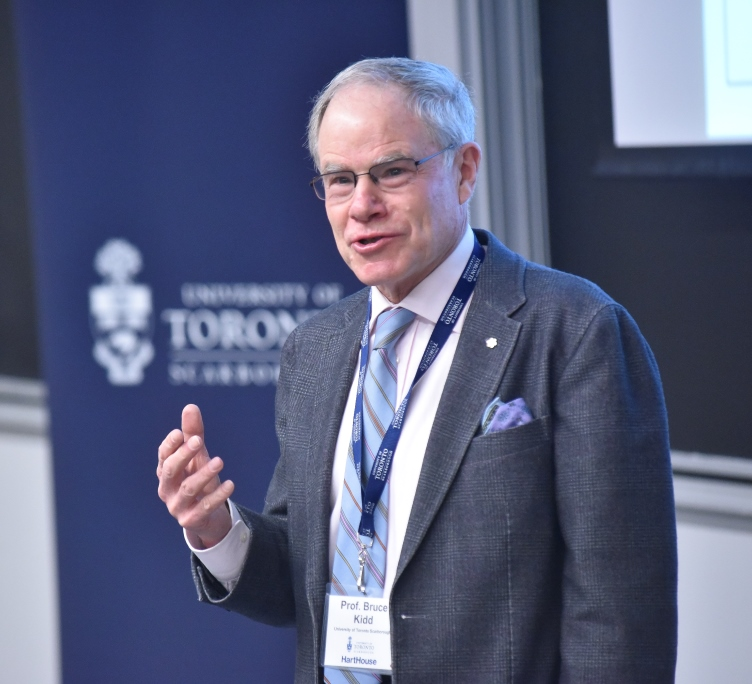

10th Vice-President and Principal of the University of Toronto Scarborough
- In office February 27, 2014 – 2018
- President: Meric Gertler
- Preceded by: Franco Vaccarino
- Succeeded by: Wisdom J. Tettey

1st Dean of the University of Toronto Faculty of Kinesiology and Physical Education
- In office 1998 – 2010
- Preceded by: Position established
- Succeeded by: Ira Jacobs

Personal details
- Born: July 26, 1943 (age 83) Ottawa, Ontario
- Education: University of Toronto (BA); University of Chicago (AM); York University (MA, PhD)
- Awards: Order of Canada

Academic work
- Discipline: Sport and public policy
- Institutions: University of Toronto

Bruce Kidd, OC (born July 26, 1943) is a Canadian academic, author, and athlete. He is professor emeritus at the University of Toronto where he previously served as the first dean of its Faculty of Kinesiology and Physical Education and the 10th vice-president and principal of its Scarborough campus.

Born in Ottawa, Ontario, he attended Malvern Collegiate Institute before becoming a member of the University of Toronto track and field team. He won 18 national senior championships in Canada, the United States, and Britain. He won a gold (in the 6 Miles event) and bronze medal (in the 3 Miles event) at the 1962 British Empire and Commonwealth Games and was a member of the Canadian 1964 Summer Olympics team (competing in the Men's 5000 metres, Men's 10000 metres and scheduled to start in the Men's marathon). His personal bests included a time of 2:20:18 to win the Peach Bowl Marathon in Atlanta, Georgia, on December 28, 1974, and an indoor best for two miles 8:39.0 in Wembley, England, on March 30, 1964. On outdoor tracks, he had times of 8:38.2, two months later in Modesto, California. For five kilometres, he ran 13:43.8, in Compton, California, when he was only eighteen years old, and 29:46.4 for ten kilometres in 1974 in Winnipeg, Manitoba. A short documentary film about him, entitled Runner, was produced and directed by Don Owen and narrated by W. H. Auden.

He received his Bachelor of Arts in Political Economy in 1965 from the University of Toronto and a Master of Arts in Adult Education in 1968 from the University of Chicago. He also received a Master of Arts in history in 1980 and a Ph.D. in history in 1990 from York University. Kidd has an honorary doctor of laws from Dalhousie University. In 1970, he joined the University of Toronto as a lecturer. He was appointed an assistant professor in 1973 and an associate professor in 1979. In 1991, he was appointed a professor. He was formerly director of the School of Physical and Health Education and acting director of the Department of Athletics and Recreation. He is a professor in the Faculty of Kinesiology and Physical Education where he served as the inaugural dean from 1998 to 2010, and later the warden of Hart House. On February 27, 2014, Kidd became the interim vice-president and principal of the University of Toronto Scarborough. Subsequently, in December 2014, he was appointed as the tenth principal of the Scarborough campus.

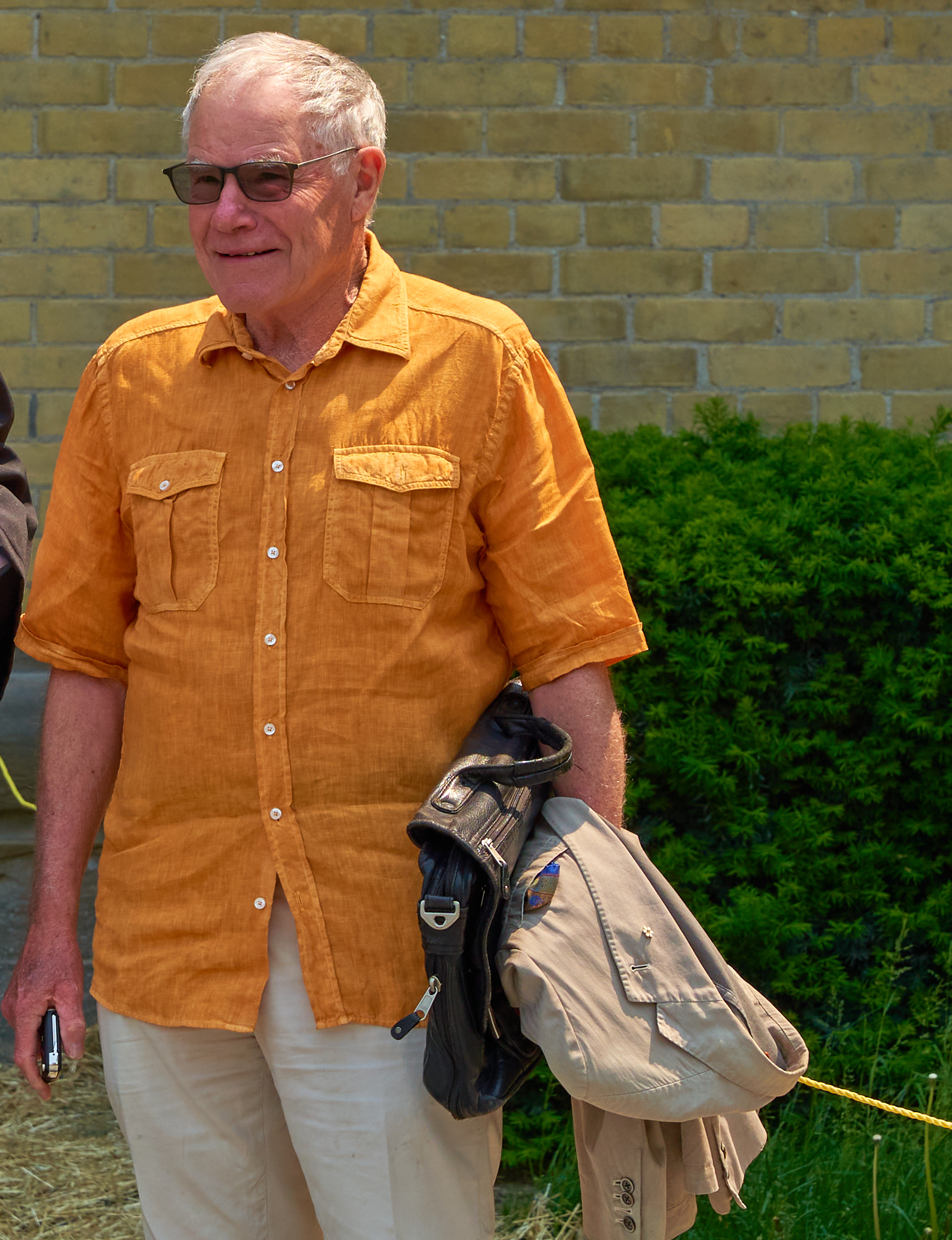
Bruce Kidd, at Convocation Hall for the UTM 2023 Graduation

He is an honorary member of the Canadian Olympic Committee and volunteer chair of the selection committee, Canada's Sports Hall of Fame. In 2018, Bruce was inducted into Scarborough Walk of Fame.

== Politics ==
Kidd ran for the Ontario New Democratic Party in the riding of Beaches—Woodbine in the 1971 Ontario general election. He lost with less than 40% of the vote.

== Awards and honours ==
- 1961 and 1962 – the Canadian Press' Athlete of the Year.
- 1961 – awarded the Lou Marsh Trophy.
- 1966 – inducted into the Canadian Olympic Hall of Fame as an athlete.
- 1968 – inducted into Canada's Sports Hall of Fame.
- 1988 – inducted into the University of Toronto Sports Hall of Fame.
- 1994 – inducted into the Canadian Olympic Hall of Fame as a builder. (Kidd is the only person to have been twice elected to this hall of fame).
- 2004 – made an Officer of the Order of Canada for having "devoted his life to eradicating sexism and racism in sporting communities around the world".

== Selected bibliography ==
- The Death of Hockey (with John Mcfarlane, 1972)
- The Political Economy of Sport (1979)
- Tom Longboat (1980)
- Hockey Showdown (1980)
- Who's a Soccer Player (1980)
- Athletes' Rights in Canada (with Mary Eberts, 1982)
- The Struggle for Canadian Sport (1996), winner of the North American Society of Sport History book prize.
- "Sports and Masculinity (2013)
