= Donald Forster =

Canadian academic (1934–1983)

President of the University of Guelph
- In office 1975–1983

3rd Vice-President and Provost of the University of Toronto
- In office 1971–1975
- President: John H. Sword (acting); John Robert Evans
- Preceded by: John H. Sword
- Succeeded by: Donald Chant

Personal details
- Born: 1934 Toronto, Ontario, Canada
- Died: August 8, 1983 (aged 48–49) Toronto, Ontario

Donald Forster (1934 – August 8, 1983) was a Canadian academic. He was president of the University of Guelph, and was appointed president of the University of Toronto just before his death.

Born in Toronto, Ontario, he was a graduate of University College at the University of Toronto, where he earned his BA in 1956, and of Harvard University. Later, he was a professor of economics in the department of political economy at the University of Toronto. He was also U of T's vice-president and provost from 1971 to 1975. From 1975 to 1983, he was president of the University of Guelph.

He died in 1983 at St. Michael's Hospital in Toronto after suffering a heart attack.
