= David Carlton Williams =

Canadian psychologist (1912–1994)

5th President and Vice-Chancellor of the University of Western Ontario
- In office 1967 – 1977
- Chancellor: Albert Trueman; John Robarts; J. Allyn Taylor
- Preceded by: George Edward Hall
- Succeeded by: George Connell

1st Principal of Erindale College, Toronto
- In office 1966 – 1968
- Preceded by: Position established
- Succeeded by: John Tuzo Wilson

1st Principal of Scarborough College, Toronto
- In office 1964 – 1965
- Preceded by: Position established
- Succeeded by: Wynne Plumptre

Personal details
- Born: 7 July 1912 Winnipeg
- Died: 6 April 1994

Academic background
- Education: University of Manitoba (BSc); University of Toronto (MSc, PhD)
- Thesis: Alienation and schooling: Toward non-institutional curriculum testing (1940)

David Carlton Williams (1912–1994) was a Canadian psychologist known for his research in educational psychology and as an academic administrator. He served as president and vice-chancellor of the University of Western Ontario from 1967 to 1977. Prior to that, he was instrumental in the establishment of Scarborough College and Erindale College of the University of Toronto, serving as the first principal of both campuses in the mid-1960s.

== Academic career ==
Williams was born in Winnipeg where he attended Kelvin Technical High School. One of his classmates was Marshall McLuhan with whom he maintained a close relationship throughout his life. He obtained his BSc from University of Manitoba in 1932. He then proceeded to the University of Toronto from which he obtained an MSc (1937) followed by a PhD (1940). The topic of his PhD dissertation was educational psychology and he subsequently developed expertise in educational administration.

He was appointed to the Department of Psychology at the University of Toronto. In 1957 he developed a television programme on the psychology and philosophy of modern living. In the following year he was appointed Director of the University Extension service and began to move more into administration. In 1963 he was appointed vice-president of the University of Toronto and the following year he became the first principal of its Scarborough College until 1965. He was then the first principal of the university's Erindale College from 1966 to 1968, where he was succeeded by John Tuzo Wilson. In 1967 he was appointed president and vice-chancellor of the University of Western Ontario where he remained until his retirement in 1977.

During the Second World War Williams served with the Canadian National Research Council and with the Royal Canadian Air Force where he was initially involved in research into personnel selection. He then became a pilot and served in the air force.

== Honours and awards ==
- President of the Canadian Psychological Association (1954–1955)
- President, Metropolitan Educational Television Association, Toronto
- Chairman, Television Sub-committee of the Committee of Presidents of the Provincially Assisted Universities of Ontario
- Hon LLD, University of Manitoba, 1969

== Legacy ==
- D. Carlton Williams Gold Medal in Education: awarded annually by the Faculty of Education, University of Western Ontario

== Publications ==
The Arts as Communication, University of Toronto Press, 1962
