= Greg O'Gallagher =

American actor and musician

- Born: Gregory O'Gallagher; September 21, 1991 (age 35); Toronto, Ontario, Canada
- Other name: Kinobody
- Education: University of Guelph
- Occupations: Social media personality; Entrepreneur; CEO of Kinobody; youtuber; actor; producer

YouTube information
- Channel: Kinobody
- Years active: 2009–present
- Genres: Fitness; Motivation; Vlog
- Subscribers: 733 thousand
- Views: 242 million
- Last updated: March 26, 2024

Gregory O'Gallagher (born 21 September 1991), also known as Kinobody, is a Canadian social media personality.

O'Gallagher rose to fame in 2015 with the release of the YouTube video The Real Bruce Wayne Revealed: The Power Of Intermittent Fasting (4K). As of July 2023, the video has over 3.3 million views.

He also received worldwide attention with the release and promotional work of his fitness, diet and lifestyle brand, Kinobody.

== Early life and education ==
O'Gallagher was born on September 21, 1991, and was born and raised in Toronto, Ontario.

After the death of his father when he was 11 years old, his mother raised Gregory and his four siblings. He quickly discovered his passion for fitness and martial arts.

At the age of 18, O'Gallagher attended University of Guelph in Canada to study business and marketing. He dropped out at the age of 19.

== Career ==
Through social media, O'Gallagher creates content which aims to motivate and educate viewers who are interested in fitness. He has become widely known in the fitness community.

O'Gallagher created his YouTube channel on June 10, 2006. He released his first video on the November 16, 2009.

He promotes intermittent fasting. O'Gallagher often discusses the benefits and his personal experience with intermittent fasting in his videos and fitness programs.

After becoming successful in fitness and accumulating a large social media following, O'Gallagher decided to pursue a career working in the film industry. He has acted and executive produced in two feature films.

After dropping out of school after a year, O'Gallagher launched an internet fitness brand called Kinobody. By 2016, Kinobody became one of the leading fitness programs in the world with over one hundred thousand customers.

According to O'Gallagher, Kinobody grossed $2 million in 2016, $3.6 million in 2017 and $8 million in 2018 due to its large catalog of products.

Kinobody created a clothing brand in 2018.

== Filmography ==
=== Film ===
Year	Title	Roles	Notes
2018	The Russian Bride	Keller	Executive producer
2018	Life with Dog	—	Executive producer only
2021	Senior Entourage	Greg	
