= John Douglas MacLachlan =

Canadian botanist (1906–1987)

- Born: July 30, 1906; Burritts Rapids, Ontario
- Died: October 13, 1987 (aged 81)
- Occupation: botanist
- Known for: president of the University of Guelph

John Douglas MacLachlan (July 30, 1906 – October 13, 1987) was a Canadian botanist and the first president of the University of Guelph.

Born on a farm near Burritts Rapids, Ontario, he received a Bachelor of Arts degree in chemistry and biology at Queen's University in 1931. He received a Master of Arts degree in 1933 and Ph.D. in plant pathology in 1935 from Harvard University. In 1939, he was appointed assistant professor of botany at the Ontario Agricultural College. He became head of the Department of Biology in 1948 and president in 1950. He was the first president of the University of Guelph serving from 1964 to 1967.

The J.D. MacLachlan Building at the University of Guelph is named in his honour.

He died of pneumonia in 1987.
