= William B. McBurney =

Irish poet

- Died: 1892
- Other names: Caroll Malone
- Occupation: poet
- Years active: 1845-1892
- Employer: Boston Pilot

William B. McBurney (died 1892) was an Irish poet who used the pseudonym Carroll Malone. He was the author of The Croppy Boy, a poem commemorating the Irish Rebellion of 1798, and “The Good Ship Castle Down”. He immigrated to the United States, where he continued to write poetry in Boston, Massachusetts. He died in 1892.
