= The Croppy Boy =

Irish sentimental ballad

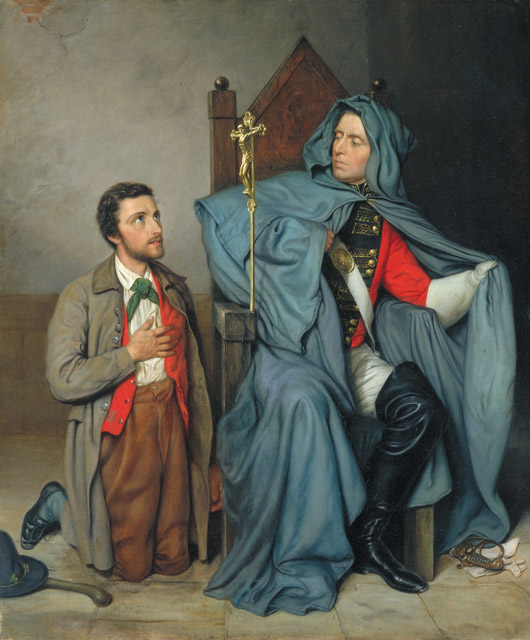
Charlotte Schreiber's painting The Croppy Boy (The Confession of an Irish Patriot)

"The Croppy Boy" (Roud 1030) is an Irish sentimental ballad set during the Irish Rebellion of 1798 which depicts the fate of a fictional Society of United Irishmen rebel, who were also known as croppies. Versions of the ballad first appeared shortly after the rebellion's suppression, being sung by street peddlers in Ireland. There were also several broadside versions of the ballad that were printed. These typically include the phrase "500 Guineas" or "one thousand pounds", and are also sung to the tune of the old Irish air Cailín Óg a Stór. They may form the basis for the ballad Lady Franklin's Lament.

A version of the ballad by William B. McBurney (aka Carroll Malone) first appeared in the Irish newspaper The Nation in 1845 and concerns a fictional rebel who stops in a Catholic church on his way to participate in the rebellion. He sees a cloaked figure in a confessional and kneels for the penitential rite. Unbeknownst to him, the figure is actually a yeomanry captain who sought refuge from the rebels by hiding in the confessional. After the youth completes his confession, the officer reveals himself and proceeds to arrest the youth and take him away to be imprisoned in Geneva Barracks and then executed. McBurney's version is the subject of English-Canadian artist Charlotte Schreiber's painting The Croppy Boy (The Confession of an Irish Patriot), now on display in the National Gallery of Canada.

The noted singer Anne Byrne (1943-2020) accompanied by Paddy Roche and Mick Crotty recorded in 1967 a famous version of "The Croppy Boy", on the album , "I Chose the Green".
