= Maura Doyle =

Canadian artist

- Born: 1973 (age 52–53)
- Education: NSCAD; MFA, University of Guelph
- Notable work: There's a New Boulder in Town
- Style: Conceptual Artist
- Awards: K. M. Hunter Award for Visual Art, 2017
- Website: mauradoyle.net

Maura Doyle (born 1973) is a Canadian conceptual artist. She is best known for her controversial sculpture There's a New Boulder in Town.

== Early life and education ==
Doyle grew up in the Ottawa Valley in Ontario, Canada. She graduated with a BFA from the Emily Carr Institute in Vancouver, British Columbia, and an MFA from the University of Guelph.

Beginning in 1994, Doyle and her friend Annie Dunning created a series of ten annual mail order catalogues, from which objects could be ordered from the artists. The catalogues were created as zines, to be shared with other artists through the mail. At the time, her zine work was not accepted as art by the faculty of Emily Carr.

== Career ==
Doyle's career has spanned numerous artistic forms, including publications, sculpture and public installations. The often eclectic forms of her work and the elements of novelty, multiple production and prank have been recognized as relating to the Intermedia aspect of Fluxus art. In addition to Doyle's public art work There's A New Boulder In Town, she also has boulder-related work installed in Vancouver, British Columbia. Monument to All Boulders in Vancouver and on Planet Earth is a five tonne granite boulder, donated to the City of Vancouver by Or Gallery in 2005.

In 2014, Doyle exhibited a series of 19 clay fired pots in the exhibition Who the Pot? at YYZ Gallery in Toronto. This work was subsequently shown at a 2016 exhibition at the Carleton University Art Gallery in Ottawa, where it won the “Innovation in Collection-Based Exhibition” Award at the 40th annual Ontario Association of Art Galleries Awards.

=== There's a New Boulder in Town ===
In 2004–2005, the Toronto Sculpture Garden exhibited Doyle's There's a New Boulder in Town. The exhibition included Erratic, a boulder known as a large glacial erratic, accompanied by a booklet titled There's a New Boulder in Town: Guidebook to Toronto's Erratic Boulders for Locals and Visitors. The booklet highlighted 20 similar boulders, all in the city of Toronto. The boulder itself had been brought from Peterborough, Ontario, to Toronto for the exhibit. A bronze plaque stating "ERRATIC BOULDER" was attached to it. The billion-year old boulder was offered for sale through the booklet for $9500, or 50 cents a pound. This arrangement would come with free delivery - largely covered by the cost of sale. When no offers were made, the artist considered paying to have the boulder removed to the Leslie Spit, an urban clean fill park, or to donate the work to the city as a work of public sculpture.

In 2005 the boulder was permanently installed in Christie Pits park.

=== Exhibitions ===
- 2016. Maura Doyle: the Vessel, that with fugitive Articulation answer'd how deep is your love?. Carleton University Art Gallery. Ottawa, ON.
- 2013. New Age Beaver. Modern Fuel, Kingston, ON.
- 2011. Bone Dump. Nuit Blanche. Toronto, ON.
- 2002. Maura Doyle 2002. Or Gallery, Vancouver BC.

=== Collections ===
Doyle's work is in the collections of the City of Toronto, the City of Vancouver and the City of Ottawa. The Art Gallery of Ontario's Library & Archives contains several examples of her artist books. Her collaborative multimedia work Spaceship Earth (under the name of G.L.N., working in collaboration with the artist Tony Romano) is in the collection of the Agnes Etherington Art Centre at Queen's University.

== Awards ==
Doyle is the recipient of the 2017 K. M. Hunter Award for Visual Art.
