= Franco Vaccarino =

Franco J. Vaccarino

8th President of the University of Guelph
- In office August 15, 2014 – July 23, 2020
- Preceded by: Alastair Summerlee
- Succeeded by: Charlotte Yates

9th Vice-President and Principal of the University of Toronto Scarborough
- In office 2007 – 2014
- President: David Naylor; Meric Gertler
- Preceded by: Kwong-loi Shun
- Succeeded by: Bruce Kidd

Personal details
- Education: University of Toronto
- Profession: Professor and Neuroscientist

Franco J. Vaccarino is a Canadian neuroscientist who served as the eighth president of the University of Guelph.

Vaccarino earned his undergraduate degree from the University of Toronto, graduating from Erindale College in 1978. He started his career at the university in 1984 where he served as principal of its Scarborough campus and vice-president under presidents David Naylor and Meric Gertler from 2007 to 2014. In August 2014, he was elected to succeed Alastair Summerlee as the president of the University of Guelph. He retired from this position at the end of July, 2020.

As of January 2026, Vaccarino sits on the board of the Azrieli Foundation.
