= Kimberly Moffit =

Canadian singer and media personality

- Education: University of Guelph (BA), Wilfrid Laurier University (MA), Middlesex University (PhD)
- Occupation: Relationship Therapist
- Years active: 2008 to present
- Employer: KMA Therapy
- Website: www.kmatherapy.com

Kimberly Moffit is a Canadian relationship therapist and media personality. She is also a former member of the all-girl pop trio Untamed and a magazine contributor.

== Early life ==
As a teenager, Moffit was a part of the all-girl pop trio Untamed, best known for their single, "You’re Not Gonna Score" for which she wrote songs and performed on vocals. The group toured North America over the span of three years and received airplay on Canadian radio. She graduated from the University of Guelph in 2006 with a Bachelor of Arts in Music and coursework in Psychology, having attended one year of school at York University as well. She earned a graduate degree in Music Therapy from Wilfrid Laurier University and interned at an addictions and mental health center in Toronto, Ontario. Her graduate thesis work was done at an area high school where she studied the therapeutic effects of songwriting in teenaged children. She then pursued a doctoral degree in Counselling Psychology at Middlesex University in London, UK.

== KMA Therapy ==
Moffit is a relationship therapist operating in Toronto. In 2008 she founded Kimberly Moffit Associates Therapy (KMA Therapy), which serves as her clinic for patients and a team of psychology professionals. She deals largely with young professionals, and makes around one hundred television appearances per year as a part of her practice.

== Media work ==
Moffit has served in the position of Relationship Insider with Match.com. She has also appeared on television media during holidays like Valentine’s Day and Christmas Day to discuss their impact on people’s emotions, and statistics regarding the dating behavior of people surrounding these days. Moffit has stated that relationship decisions and the emotions behind them can be related to the evolutionary biology of human beings, and that fear can be a driver behind poor decision making.

Additional issues that Moffit has discussed in the media include the impact of office romance on workers, both during a relationship and in the aftermath of ending one. She has also commented on the ending of relationship in general, in addition to indicators that a relationship may be ending. On the opposite side of things, she is also a commentator on relationship building and development.

In November 2013, Moffit gave the keynote address at the Ontario Women MBA Summit. Moffit has been a contributor to the Huffington Post, Post Media, Elle Canada, Fashion Magazine, and Flare Magazine.

== Personal life ==
Moffit is married and has one daughter, Kassie. Her brother Mitch Moffit is a part of ASAP Science. On August 9, 2018, Moffit announced she was pregnant with her second child. On September 13, through a gender reveal video the family announced they were expecting a boy. On Jan 9, 2026 Moffit announced she is going through a divorce on her Tiktok.
