= Bob Dylan's Dream =

Song by Bob Dylan

from the album The Freewheelin' Bob Dylan
- Released: May 27, 1963
- Recorded: April 24, 1963
- Genre: Folk
- Length: 5:03
- Label: Columbia Records
- Songwriter: Bob Dylan
- Producer: John H. Hammond

"Bob Dylan's Dream" is a song written by Bob Dylan in 1963. It was recorded by Dylan on April 24, 1963, and was released by Columbia Records a month later on the album The Freewheelin' Bob Dylan.

The song was also recorded as a demo for Dylan's publishing company, M. Witmark & Sons. The demo version, taped the day before the album track, was officially released on The Bootleg Series Vol. 9 – The Witmark Demos: 1962–1964 in October 2010. A May 10, 1963 live version of the song was released in 2011 on In Concert – Brandeis University 1963. An April 12, 1963 concert performance was included on Live 1962–1966: Rare Performances From The Copyright Collections, released in 2018.

== Background ==
Various accounts have been proposed regarding the song's inspiration, none of them being conclusive. In one, "Bob Dylan's Dream" recalls the times Dylan had spent in Greenwich Village with comedian Hugh Romney and their friends during the early 1960s. Romney, later to become Wavy Gravy of Woodstock and Merry Pranksters fame, lived above The Gaslight Cafe on MacDougal Street, where he worked as entertainment director. The two first met at the Gaslight in the spring of 1961. Dylan approached Romney about the possibility of performing and began appearing regularly at the Gaslight's hootenannies. Within a few months, he debuted at the Gaslight as a featured act.

Dylan frequently hung out upstairs in Romney's apartment and wrote one of his most significant songs there, "A Hard Rain's a-Gonna Fall", in August 1962 . The next winter, in late January or early February 1963, he wrote "Bob Dylan's Dream" possibly as a nostalgic remembrance of his early days in the Village when his life was less complex.

A differing account, by biographer and critic Robert Shelton, posits that the song concerns the lost innocence of Dylan's adolescence in Hibbing, Minnesota. John Bucklen, one of Dylan's closest friends in Hibbing in the mid-1950s, told Shelton he and Dylan used to venture out to his sister's house, where they would play guitar and sing verses. "When I heard the song 'Bob Dylan's Dream'," he said, "I couldn't help but think that some of the sessions we had at my sister's house were part of that 'Dream.'"

== The song's origins ==
According to Shelton, Dylan credited the melody of "Bob Dylan's Dream" to the traditional broadside ballad "Lord Franklin" (also known as "Lady Franklin's Lament" and "The Sailor's Dream"), which he learned from British folksinger Martin Carthy, while visiting London in late December 1962.

However, Dylan may have learned the song even earlier from his Village friend Paul Clayton, who had recorded it in 1957 for his album Whaling and Sailing Songs: From the Days of Moby Dick for Folkways (later remastered on Tradition). In either case, after returning from London two weeks later, Dylan began playing "Bob Dylan's Dream" for Gil Turner during after-hours sessions at Gerde's Folk City, where Turner was emcee.

Besides the melody, Dylan's song also shares lyrical similarities with "Lady Franklin's Lament", as in the song's closing lines:

Ten thousand dollars at the drop of a hat
I'd give it all gladly if our lives could be like that.

— Bob Dylan, closing verses of "Bob Dylan's Dream"

"Lady Franklin's Lament" concludes on a similar note:

Ten thousand pounds would I freely give
To know on earth, that my Franklin do live.

— Traditional, closing verses of "Lady Franklin's Lament"

Within a short time, Dylan made the song a regular part of his repertoire, performing it for his first major New York concert at Town Hall on April 12, 1963. Less than two weeks later, on April 24, he recorded two takes of the song at Columbia's Studio A, one of which was selected for the album Freewheelin' Bob Dylan.

== Notable cover versions ==
- Peter, Paul, and Mary on Album 1700, 1967
- Judy Collins on Judy Sings Dylan...Just Like a Woman, 1993
- Phil Carmen on Bob Dylan's Dream, 1996
- Kinky Friedman on Classic Snatches from Europe, 2003
- Bryan Ferry on Chimes of Freedom: The Songs of Bob Dylan Honoring 50 Years of Amnesty International, 2012

== See also ==
- List of Bob Dylan songs based on earlier tunes
