= Alexandra Gillespie =

Principal of the University of Toronto Mississauga

10th Vice-President and Principal of the University of Toronto Mississauga
- Incumbent
- Assumed office July 1, 2020
- President: Meric Gertler; Melanie Woodin
- Preceded by: Ian Orchard (acting)

Personal details
- Born: New Zealand
- Education: Victoria University of Wellington (BA); University of Oxford (MSt, DPhil)

Academic background
- Thesis: Chaucer and Lydgate in print: the Medieval author and the history of the book, 1476-1579

Academic work
- Discipline: Global book history, Medieval English
- Institutions: University of Toronto

Alexandra Gillespie is a New Zealand–Canadian historian and academic at the University of Toronto who has served as the 10th vice-president and principal of the University of Toronto Mississauga since July 1, 2020. She is the founder and director of the Digital Humanities Network and the Old Books New Science Lab at the University of Toronto.

== Biography ==
Gillespie was born in New Zealand, where she attended Victoria University of Wellington, earning a Bachelor of Arts (BA) in English. She was awarded the Rhodes Scholarship in 1997 and attended the University of Oxford, where she earned her Master of Studies (MSt) at Corpus Christi College and Doctor of Philosophy (DPhil). Her thesis was titled Chaucer and Lydgate in print: the Medieval author and the history of the book, 1476-1579. Following her doctorate, she was a postdoctoral fellow at Balliol College, Oxford and Darwin College, Cambridge.

Prior to becoming a professor, Gillespie worked in New Zealand as a management consultant in the education sector.

She joined the University of Toronto in 2004 in the Department of English and Drama, University of Toronto Mississauga, as an assistant professor specializing in manuscript studies, medieval literature, and global book history. She is cross-appointed in the Department of English (Faculty of Arts and Science) and the Centre for Medieval Studies, and organized tours of the Thomas Fisher Rare Books Library.

Her book Print Culture and the Medieval Author was published in 2006. In 2010, she was awarded the University of Toronto Mississauga's Teaching Excellence Award.

On July 1, 2020, Gillespie was appointed the 10th principal of the University of Toronto Mississauga, and vice-president of the University of Toronto, set to end on December 31, 2025. Her term was extended in 2025 by two years, to run until December 31, 2027.

== Research ==
Gillespie is a scholar of 14th-century writer Geoffrey Chaucer, and studies manuscripts, medieval literature, global book history, and fungal growth in books. She is a founder and the first director of the Digital Humanities Network, part of the University of Toronto tri-campus Jackman Humanities Institute, and director of the Old Books New Science Lab.

== Selected publications ==
- Gillespie, A. 2006. Print Culture and the Medieval Author: Chaucer, Lydgate, and Their Books 1473-1557. Oxford: Oxford University Press.
- Gillespie, A. and Wakelin, D. 2011. The production of books in England 1350-1500. Cambridge: Cambridge University Press.
- Gillespie, A. 2008. "Reading Chaucer's Words to Adam". The Chaucer Review. 42 (3). Penn State University Press. 269-283.
- Gadd, I. and Gillespie, A. 2004. John Stow (1525-1605) and the making of the English past: essays in early modern culture and the history of the book. The British Library.
- Gillespie, A. 2004. "Poets, Printers, and Early English Sammelbände". Huntington Library Quarterly. 67 (2). University of California Press. 189-214.
- Bahr, A. and Gillespie, A. 2013. "Medieval English Manuscripts: Form, Aesthetics, and the Literary Text". The Chaucer Review. 47 (4). Penn State University Press. 346-360.
