= Samy Mahmoud =

Canadian academic administrator

Samy A. Mahmoud

President (pro tempore) of Carleton University
- In office 2006–2008

Chancellor of the University of Sharjah
- In office 2008–2013

Personal details
- Education: Carleton University; Ain Shams University

Samy A. Mahmoud was the 5th chancellor of University of Sharjah (2008–2013), and formerly the acting president of Carleton University (2006–2008).

== Biography ==
Samy A. Mahmoud was the 5th chancellor of the University of Sharjah (2008–2013). Previously, he served as the acting president of Carleton University, appointed in November, 2006, after the resignation of David W. Atkinson. He is at present professor of systems and computer engineering at Carleton University, leading a research group on sensor technologies and platforms.

Dr. Mahmoud graduated from Carleton University in 1975 with a doctorate in electrical engineering. He has served various roles at Carleton, including acting provost, vice-president (academic), dean of the Faculty of Engineering and Design and chair of the Department of Systems and Computer Engineering.

== Honors and awards ==
- Mahmoud was the recipient of IEEE Canada's McNaughton Award in 2024, recognizing his work on digital speech processing, wireless networks, and pioneering contributions in other technologies.

== See also ==
- List of Canadian university leaders
