= Donald Arthur Hatch =

Canadian agrologist, aviator, writer, and humanist (1930–2020)

- Born: May 20, 1930; Guelph, Ontario, Canada
- Died: September 24, 2020 (aged 90); London, Ontario, Canada
- Education: Ontario Agricultural College
- Alma mater: University of Guelph
- Occupation: Canadian chemical industry
- Known for: Humanist author and lecturer, past president of the Humanist Association of London and Area (HALA)
- Spouse: Winnagene Hatch (née Seaton)
- Children: Alison Cunningham; Graham Hatch
- Parent(s): Arthur James Hatch; Ruth Pringle Powell Hatch

Donald Arthur Hatch (May 20, 1930 – September 24, 2020) was a Canadian agrologist, aviator, writer, and humanist lecturer, born in Guelph, Ontario, Canada. He was the author of numerous scholarly articles published in various Canadian journals. He was also the author of a thought-provoking work on philosophy and religion entitled The Road Not Travelled: How the Democracy, Science and Humanism of the Greeks Was Suppressed by the Early Christian Church and How That Obstructed the Progress of Humanity. The thoughts expressed therein are generally consonant with the credo of Humanist Canada, and other humanist associations around the world.

== Early life ==
Hatch was born in the first year of the Great Depression, the eldest of four children born to Arthur "Bob" Hatch and Ruth Powell Hatch (née Pringle). He attended the Ontario Agricultural College, then affiliated with the University of Toronto, graduating with a degree in Chemistry in 1953. His father Arthur, who worked in the railroad industry, had a massive heart attack in his 40s as a consequence of rheumatic fever in infancy. His mother Ruth thereafter supported the family financially working as a registered nurse. At the end of World War II, Hatch was fascinated by the traveling barnstormers, one of whom took him up for his first airplane flight. He remained interested in aviation for the remainder of his life.

== Career ==
After graduation, Hatch secured a position with the Witt's Fertilizer Works in Norwich, Ontario, where he worked for six years before being promoted to the Montreal, Quebec head office of Canadian Industries Limited (CIL) which had acquired Witt's. While in Norwich, he met and married Winnagene Seaton (1956) who taught at the local high school. They had two children. He would work for CIL for 38 years as an agrologist (see Agronomy) and in marketing. His work took him to Great Britain where he worked for Imperial Chemical Limited, situated in Norton-on-Tees, United Kingdom. He returned to his native Canada where his work continued in the city of London, Ontario, then on to Surrey, British Columbia, and ultimately settling once again in London, Ontario, for the remainder of his career.

Upon retiring in 1990, he turned his attention to aviation, vintage radio repair, ham radio, philosophy, and humanism. He realized his dream of earning a private pilot's license. He was active in the 427 Wing of the Royal Canadian Air Force Association as well as the London, Ontario, chapter of the Recreational Aircraft Association (RAA). He co-founded the London Vintage Radio Club. He and a group of like-minded thinkers founded the Humanist Association of London and Area (HALA) where he served as president for a decade.

== Works ==
Hatch is the author of The Road Not Travelled: How the Democracy, Science and Humanism of the Greeks Was Suppressed by the Early Christian Church and How That Obstructed the Progress of Humanity. It is published by the Humanist Association of Canada. In this work, he describes two distinct ideological paths upon which early western society might have travelled: the Athenian Road and the Jerusalem Road—the former leading to the democracy, philosophy, and humanism of ancient Classical Greek culture, and the latter leading to the monotheistic Abrahamic faiths of Christianity and Islam. His premise is that "... it would be beneficial for Western societies to strive toward getting fully back on the Athenian road working toward societies that are largely secular." He then offers examples of how this might be accomplished, building upon efforts that have even now been met with a measure of success, particularly certain Scandinavian countries (i.e., Sweden, Norway).

He was also the long-time editor of the HALA "mini-journal" called The Enlightenment. In 2020, he compiled various highlights from The Enlightenment into a monograph called An Enlightening Compendium: A Secular Mini-Journal for Inquiring Minds.

== Review ==
In praise of the book, Goldwin Emerson, Professor Emeritus of Education, University of Western Ontario (Canada) wrote:

"The Road Not Travelled is a concise, informative book. Donald Hatch has packed each page with knowledge and with thoughtful comments about our past and about the emergence of a hopeful future as we proceed from the path of religious superstition and supernaturalism into a more enlightened time."

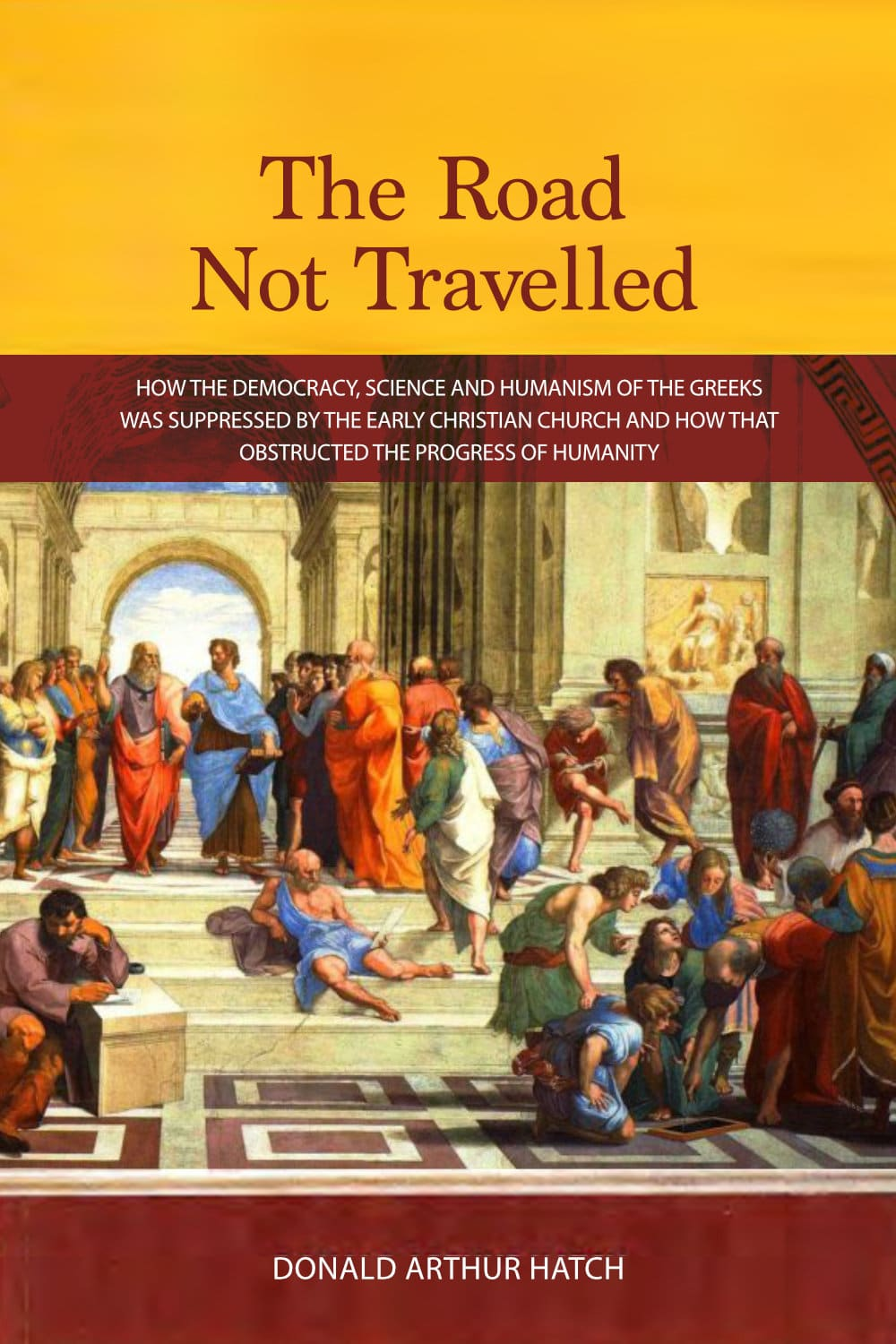
The Road Not Travelled

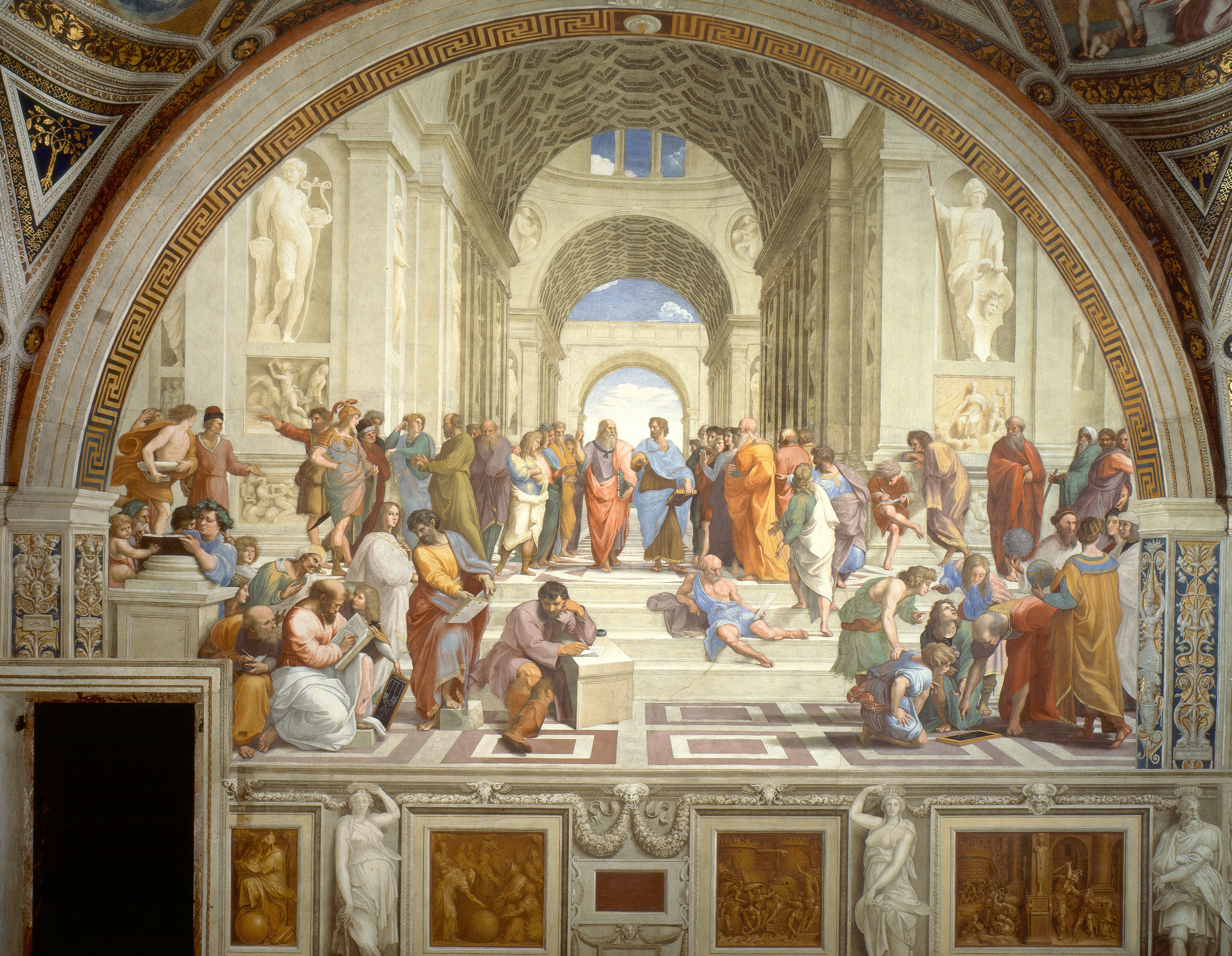
The School of Athens by Raphael, (Raffaello Sanzio da Urbino), ca. 1509–1511 C.E. Image chosen by Donald Hatch for the cover of his 2014 book The Road Not Traveled.

For the cover of his book, Hatch chose the Renaissance work The School of Athens, as it depicts many of the great thinkers, Philosophers, and Scientists of ancient Greece, and pre-Christian Rome. Among those represented therein are Plato, Aristotle, Socrates, and Epicurus.

== Bibliography ==
- Hatch, Donald A. The Road Not Travelled: How the Democracy, Science and Humanism of the Greeks was Suppressed by the Early Christian Church and How That Obstructed the Progress of Humanity, (2014), Aurora Humanist Books, Canadian Humanist Publications, Ottawa, Ontario, Canada ISBN 978-0-9686014-2-6
- Hatch, Donald A., with Dr. Rod A. Martin, An Enlightening Compendium: A Secular Mini-Journal for Inquiring Minds (excerpts from The Enlightenment)
