= Cecil Frederick Patterson =

Canadian horticulturist

- Born: 1891; Watford, Ontario
- Died: 1961 (aged 69–70)
- Education: PhD horticulture
- Occupation: Head of the new Department of Horticulture
- Employer: University of Saskatchewan
- Known for: Patterson Gardens at University of Saskatchewan, hardy fruits, lilies
- Title: Department head
- Predecessor: first
- Spouse: Laura Gibson Fraser
- Children: Edith Cecilia, Joyce Fraser, Frederick Laurence

Cecil Frederick Patterson (1891–1961) was renowned in Saskatchewan for his work on hardy fruits and flowers.

Patterson began in 1921 as a lecturer in the College of Agriculture at the University of Saskatchewan and headed the newly organized Department of Horticulture in the following year. In his 39 years as head of the Department of Horticulture, Patterson was responsible for the introduction of more than 52 new varieties of hardy fruits for the prairies and over 18 varieties of hybrid hardy lilies, as well as several varieties of ornamental plants. He is "credited with originating fruit breeding work on the prairies," effectively extending the growing potential of gardens across the west. His experimental – and non-irrigated — nursery was believed to be the world's largest. His accomplishments included 30 new varieties of hardy fruits, including apples, pears, plums, cherries, raspberries and strawberries. His namesake apples, plums, and pears thrive in orchards and gardens throughout western Canada today. He was also responsible for an improved potato variety, well adapted to prairie growing conditions.

Patterson's research was not limited to fruit. He was also deeply interested in expanding prairie gardens and developing varieties which would withstand the harsh Saskatchewan winters. He succeeded, with his name becoming synonymous with a collection of lily varieties in pink, white, rose and other colours, the result of a dedicated and patient cross breeding and selection program which spanned over 20 years. Among his breeds, "Edith Cecilia" (named after his eldest daughter who died at age 13), "White Princess", "Jasper", and "Apricot Glow" are the most popular today. All are sturdy plants, seldom needing support even on the windy prairies. Other flower introductions included geraniums and gladioli.

Born at Watford, Ontario, Patterson graduated from the Ontario Agricultural College in Guelph with a BSc in agriculture. He took his master's and doctorate degrees at the University of Illinois in Urbana, Illinois. He went to the University of Saskatchewan in 1921, soon marrying the university's nurse, Laura Fraser, with whom he had three children. Patterson was a charter member of the Agricultural Institute of Canada, a Fellow of the American Society for the Advancement of Science, a charter member of the Western Canadian Society for Horticulture, and an honorary life member of the Saskatchewan Horticultural Societies Association. He was inducted into the Saskatchewan Agriculture Hall of Fame in 1973.

Patterson Garden is an arboretum on the campus of the University of Saskatchewan, named in his honour.

Patterson died on February 20, 1961.

== Sources ==
- Joyce Fraser Patterson Sarsfield, letters and conversations
