= Charlotte Yates =

Canadian academic

Academic background
- Education: Carleton University

Academic work
- Discipline: Labour studies
- Institutions: McMaster University; University of Guelph

Charlotte Yates is an academic, specialising in the Canadian automotive industry and labour issues, who served as president of the University of Guelph from March 2020 to November 2024. She was the first woman president of the university.

== Education ==
Yates has a bachelor's degree in political science from the University of Winnipeg, a master's degree from Queen’s University and a PhD from Carleton University.

== Career ==
Yates is an academic and an expert on the Canadian automotive industry and labour issues. She is president and founding director of the Automotive Research Policy Centre and a member of the YWCA national board of directors.

She began working at McMaster University in 1987. She was a part of the Labour Studies program, a faculty member in the Department of Political Science. She went on to become director of labour studies. From 2008 to 2015, Yates was dean of the faculty of social sciences at McMaster University.

From 2015 to 2020, Yates served as the University of Guelph's vice-president and provost. She was appointed as interim president of the University of Guelph in March 2020. In August 2021, she became the university's first woman president. She is the ninth president of the University of Guelph. She is also a professor in the Department of Political Science in the College of Social and Applied Human Sciences.
