= Mordechai Rozanski =

Educator and university president

Mordechai Rozanski (born 1946) served as Rider University’s sixth president from August 1, 2003, until he retired on July 31, 2015. Previously, he had served as president of the University of Guelph in Ontario Canada for ten years. Overall, he served as a faculty member and administrator for 47 years in higher education.

== Biography ==
During his term, Rider University ranked in the top-tier among northern regional universities according to the U.S. News & World Report annual rankings.

During Rozanski’s presidency, Rider University introduced fourteen new undergraduate and seven graduate degrees that helped grow overall enrollment by 8%. His commitment to online learning led to the development of more than 170 online courses and degree programs enrolling more than 2,400 students annually. These included an online masters in accounting and undergraduate degrees in business and nursing.

In 2007, under Rozanski’s leadership, the Westminster College of the Arts was established as Rider’s fourth college. It integrated Westminster Choir College’s world-class music program in Princeton with the fine arts programs in dance, music, theater and art in Lawrenceville. During his 12-year term, Rozanski raised and invested more than $150 million for institutional development.

Rozanski considers his greatest legacy to be the more than 45,000 students who graduated during his 22 years as a university president, 13,000 at Rider alone. And he shook the hands of most of the graduates.

Rozanski held the rank of professor and taught Chinese and Asian history at several universities and colleges.

Rozanski Hall, a new classroom complex, was named in his honor shortly after his departure from the University of Guelph.

He currently serves on the board of the Starfall Foundation and is a consultant to the Danaher-Lynch Foundation.

Born in Poland, the son of Holocaust survivors, Rozanski's family fled to Israel, lived in France and immigrated to Montreal in 1953. He was the first in his family to complete high school and went on to study at McGill University in Montreal, earning a B.A. in Chinese history and a Ph.D. in Chinese history/American East Asian relations at the University of Pennsylvania in 1974. He variously held summer fellowships at Columbia University and Stanford University and a year-long fellowship in Chinese language studies and research in Hong Kong.

Rozanski received American citizenship on January 19, 2008, making him a dual citizen of both Canada and the United States of America. He and his wife Bonnie now reside in Philadelphia.
