= Walter D. Young =

Walter Douglas Young
- Born: June 27, 1933; Winnipeg, Manitoba
- Died: March 11, 1984 (aged 50); Victoria, British Columbia
- Other name: Walter D. Young
- Occupations: Political Scientist; Professor; Writer
- Years active: 1957-1984
- Known for: Walter D. Young Prize at The University of British Columbia; Walter D. Young Book Prizes at The University of Victoria; Founder of BC Studies; Founding member of the NDP; Founder of B.C. Legislative Internship Program
- Spouse: Beryl Young
- Children: Jeremy, Margot and Brian
- Parent(s): Isabel Eunice Young and William Young
- Awards: Rhodes Scholar, 1955; Canadian Association of University Teachers Milner Memorial Award (posthumous), 2009

Academic background
- Education: M.A. Oxford University, 1957; Ph.D University of Toronto, 1965
- Thesis: The National CCF: Political Party and Political Movement (1965)

Academic work
- Discipline: Political Science; Politics of Canada
- Main interests: CCF; NDP; Canadian Socialism
- Notable works: The Anatomy of a Party: The National CCF, 1932-1961 (1969); Democracy and Discontent: Progressivism, Socialism and Social Credit in the Canadian West (1969); The Reins of Power: Governing British Columbia (1983)

Walter D. Young was a Canadian political scientist who has written several books that are considered the definitive resources for the Co-operative Commonwealth Federation and the New Democratic Party. His experiences as a democratic socialist in Canada led to his involvement in the founding of the NDP, provincial politics in British Columbia, and a variety of educational initiatives at The University of British Columbia and The University of Victoria.

== Personal life ==
Walter D. Young was born in 1933 in Winnipeg, Manitoba to William and Isabel Eunice Young with two older siblings: Sheila and Irvine. At a young age, he moved to Victoria, British Columbia. Young predeceased his wife Beryl and his three children: Jeremy, Margot and Brian. Margot Young is currently a law professor at University of British Columbia's Peter A. Allard School of Law.

== Academic career ==
=== Education ===
Walter Young received an Honours BA in History and English from University of British Columbia in 1955, at which point he was awarded a Rhodes Scholarship. As a Rhodes Scholar at Oxford University, he completed a BA in Politics, Philosophy, and Economics (1957) and an MA in 1957. Young completed a Ph.D. from The University of Toronto in 1965 by publishing a thesis titled The National CCF: Political Party and Political Movement.

=== Early career ===
In 1957, Young returned to Canada to accept a one-year teaching position at Royal Roads Military College in Victoria. After that year, Young took a teaching position at The United College (now the University of Winnipeg). The day after arriving in Winnipeg for the new position, newspapers broke the story about the firing of Harry S. Crowe. Along with many other staff members, Young resigned in protest of the schools decision to fire Crowe based on his criticism of the university's president. He posthumously received the Milner Memorial Award from the Canadian Association of University Teachers in response to his resignation. In search of a new position, Young took a one year research post at the University of Manitoba before completing his Ph.D.

=== University of British Columbia ===
In 1962, Young was appointed to the department of political science at the University of British Columbia (UBC) and served as the head of that department from 1969 to 1973. While at UBC, Young founded BC Studies to promote study of politics in British Columbia

While at UBC, Young founded and served as director of The BC Legislative Internship Programme and initiator of an experimental liberal arts program for first-year university students called "Arts I". Young served on the Board of Directors for UBC Press, sat on the committee for long-range prospects for UBC, and was elected to the Senate by the Joint Faculties.

=== University of Victoria ===
Young resigned from The University of British Columbia in 1973 to accept a position at The University of Victoria as the Chairman of the Department of Political Science; a position he held until 1978. In 1978, Young was elected to be the president of the Canadian Political Science Association, a post he served from 1980 to 1981.

== Political Involvement ==
=== Co-operative Commonwealth Federation and New Democratic Party ===
Young was an active member of the Co-operative Commonwealth Federation and was a founding member of the New Democratic Party during its creation. As a good friend and advisor of Tom Berger, he worked closely with him during the 1968 NDP Provincial Leadership campaign and served as an education advisor from 1973-1975 to the Provincial NDP government.

While doing his Ph.D. in Toronto, Young was an active member of the Ontario NDP. On his return to British Columbia, Young served as the Vice-President of the British Columbia NDP.

=== Legislation ===
Young worked to help enact several significant pieces of legislation. In 1974, Young chaired the University Government Committee which put a report forward to the Provincial government that led to the creation of The Universities Council which, along with The Universities Act, oversees the three public universities in British Columbia.

In 1974, Young was appointed commissioner of the newly created Legal Services Commission. The Legal Services Commission Act of 1975 established as a Crown Corporation with the goal of providing legal services to individuals in British Columbia who could not otherwise access those services. Young acted as Commissioner for two years (the maximum term length for this post). Once the NDP government lost power, Young and other faculty from University of Victoria were a driving force to enact the changes outlined by the Legal Services Commission Act.

== Publications ==
Books

- The Anatomy of a Party: The National C.C.F., 1932-1961 (University of Toronto Press, 1969 328 p.)
- Democracy and Discontent: Progressivism, Socialism and Social Credit in the Canadian West (Frontenac Library, Ryerson Press, 1969 122 p.)
- The Reins of Power (D & M, 1983); co-author

Canadian Encyclopedia Entries

- "Socialism" The Canadian Encyclopedia, Published online February 7, 2006, Historica Canada. https://www.thecanadianencyclopedia.ca/en/article/socialism. Accessed 14 July 2020. Co-authored with Alan Whitehorn
- "University of Victoria". The Canadian Encyclopedia, Published online February 20, 2012, Historica Canada. https://www.thecanadianencyclopedia.ca/en/article/university-of-victoria. Accessed 14 July 2020.

== Other Ventures ==
- Board member for The Cedar Lodge Society, a rehabilitation centre for children with brain damage, for over 10 years
- Judge for the Eaton's Book Award, for best books related to British Columbia (1974-1982)

== Awards ==
- Rhodes Scholarship (1955)
- Canadian Association of University Teachers Milner Memorial Award (posthumous), 2009

== Eponyms ==
- Walter D. Young Prize at the University of British Columbia
- Walter D. Young Book Prizes in Political Science at The University of Victoria
- Walter D. Young Scholarship at The University of Victoria
