= Cheri DiNovo =

Canadian politician (born c. 1951)

The Reverend Cheri DiNovo CM
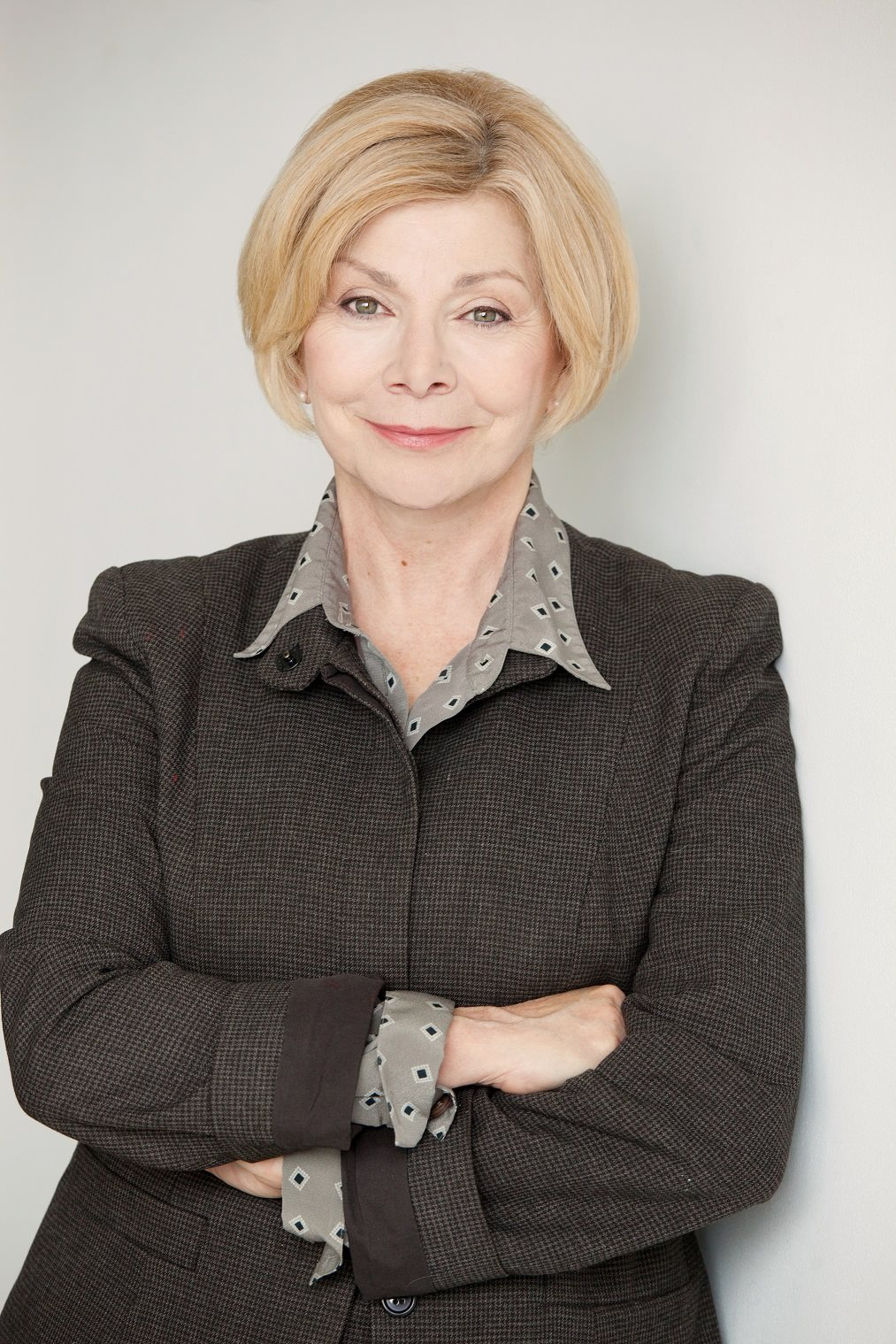

Member of the Ontario Provincial Parliament for Parkdale—High Park
- In office 14 September 2006 – 31 December 2017
- Preceded by: Gerard Kennedy
- Succeeded by: Bhutila Karpoche

Personal details
- Born: 1951 (age 74–75) Toronto, Ontario, Canada
- Party: New Democratic
- Spouse(s): Gil Gaspar (m. 1999–2019) Don Zielinski (m. ?-1992)
- Education: York University; University of Toronto
- Profession: United Church minister
- Website: cheridinovo.ca

Cheri DiNovo CM (born c. 1951) is a United Church of Canada minister and former politician in Ontario, Canada. She served at the Emmanuel-Howard Park congregation in Toronto before entering politics and, since January 2018, is the minister for the Trinity-St. Paul's Centre for Faith, Justice and the Arts.

DiNovo was a New Democratic Party member representing Parkdale—High Park in the Legislative Assembly of Ontario from 2006 to 2017. She was first elected in a by-election on 14 September 2006 and retired from politics on 31 December 2017.

== Background ==
DiNovo grew up in a rooming house owned by her parents. After her father's death from emphysema and witnessing her stepfather's suicide, she dropped out of school at Grade 10 to live on the streets for four years. During her time on the streets, she helped smuggle LSD into Canada from California inside hollowed-out bibles. Her time spent at the Fred Victor Mission convinced her to earn her high school equivalency and enrol at Centennial College, though she soon transferred from Centennial to York University. It was during her time at York that she became involved with the student protest movement of the 1960s and joined the Young Socialists of Canada. An openly bisexual woman, DiNovo was the only woman to sign Canada's first gay liberation manifesto "We Demand" in 1971.

DiNovo left university shy of her degree and began working for a corporate headhunting firm, then in the early 1980s ran her own firm—the Abbott Group, a recruitment firm that specialized in placing women in high-profile jobs—for five years. In 1988, after some church-shopping with her then-husband Don Zielinski she joined a United Church of Canada congregation in Richmond Hill, Ontario. Soon afterwards, she finished up her York University degree and enrolled at Emmanuel College at the University of Toronto. In 1992, Zielinski was killed in a motorcycle accident. She earned her masters of divinity in 1995 and served a rural charge in Brucefield, Ontario for two years before beginning her ministry at Emmanuel-Howard Park United. In 1999, she married college professor Gil Gaspar. In 2002, she earned a doctorate in ministry from the University of Toronto.

DiNovo began hosting a weekly radio show, The Radical Reverend, on Toronto's CIUT-FM in 2000 which ran until 2006, before resuming in 2017. She performed the first legal same-sex marriage registered in Canada in 2001. Her book Qu(e)erying Evangelism: Growing a Community from the Outside In won the Lambda Literary Award in the Spirituality category for 2006.

She has two children, Francesca and Damien Zielinski.

As of 2013, she continued to appear on CIUT as host of 3 Women, a weekly show in which she moderates a political discussion with two guests, other women in politics, or leaders of social initiatives.

According to Ontario Premier Kathleen Wynne, DiNovo "passed more private member's bills than anyone else. She pulled together more three-party agreement bills than anyone else." MPP DiNovo introduced more successful LGBTQ bills to a legislature or parliament than anyone in Canadian history, including Toby's Act (named after DiNovo's deceased transgender friend and congregant, Toby Dancer) which added trans rights to the Ontario Human Rights Code in 2012, the Affirming Sexual Orientation and Gender Identity Act which banned conversion therapy for LGBTQ youth in 2015, Cy and Ruby's Act which established parent equality for LGBTQ parents in 2015, and the Trans Day of Remembrance Act in 2017.

== Politics ==
=== NDP nomination and 2006 Parkdale–High Park by-election ===
When Gerard Kennedy stepped down as the Member of Provincial Parliament (MPP) for Parkdale–High Park, two candidates came forward to contest the NDP nomination: DiNovo and former journalist and, at the time of the nomination, executive director of the Canadian Arab Federation, Mohamed Boudjenane. The spirited campaign that followed lasted about a month, with both sides signing up large numbers of new members. Boudjenane was endorsed by United Steelworkers of America president Leo W. Gerard and the former president of the Ontario NDP, Andre Foucault. DiNovo had the support of NDP stalwart Michael Lewis—brother of former Ontario NDP leader Stephen Lewis, and son of Canadian former federal NDP leader David Lewis—and many members of the riding's executive. The nomination meeting took place in the middle of a heat wave on the evening of 17 July 2006, in the Parkdale Collegiate Institute auditorium. The sweltering auditorium was filled with over 300 people, most of them delegates. DiNovo defeated Boudjenane with a comfortable margin.

DiNovo defeated Liberal Sylvia Watson in the 14 September 2006 by-election to replace Gerard Kennedy in the Legislative Assembly of Ontario. She officially took her seat in the Assembly on 25 September.

During the campaign, DiNovo acknowledged having both been a "street kid" and undertaken recreational drug use in her youth, for which Watson's campaign criticized her. CTV accused the Liberals of conducting a smear campaign during the election.

=== Poverty and the $10 minimum wage campaign ===
In October 2006, a Toronto Star column by Carol Goar said DiNovo had brought a new clarity and assertiveness to the NDP caucus' voice in the Ontario Legislative Assembly. Ince the Assembly, DiNovo approached a variety of poverty-related issues, including raising minimum wage and welfare rates in the province, creating more affordable housing and ending the government's tax clawback of the federal child benefit supplement.

Earlier in the year DiNovo had shared her experiences of drugs and poverty as a 15-year-old, in a TV interview first shown on VisionTV on 9 March 2006. Among other things, she said, "I know what it's like to live on the streets … street kids are not bogey men, they are just poor".

=== 39th Parliament election and sessions ===
DiNovo retained her seat in the 2007 Ontario general election and began serving her term in the Ontario Legislature's 39th Parliament sessions. The Parkdale–High Park campaign featured the same three major candidates as the 2006 by-election, with Watson and David Hutcheon representing the Liberals and the Progressive Conservatives respectively. She increased the margin of victory from the 2006 by-election.

When Howard Hampton announced he was stepping down as leader of the Ontario New Democratic Party in June 2008, DiNovo was one of four MPPs, along with Michael Prue, Peter Tabuns and Andrea Horwath, whose names were suggested by party insiders as potential candidates in the 2009 Ontario NDP leadership convention. However, she was quoted in the Toronto Star a few days later as saying that she was unlikely to be a candidate and she subsequently endorsed Tabuns for the leadership.

She became the Third Deputy Chair of the Committee of the Whole House, also known as the "Deputy Speaker", on 26 March 2009. On 16 September 2009, she was promoted to Second Deputy Chair of the Committee of the Whole House.

In 2012, DiNovo succeeded in getting Toby's Act passed, an amendment to the Ontario Humans Rights Code to include gender identity and gender expression—the first of its kind in North America.

During the 39th Parliament, DiNovo introduced many other bills covering such concerns as repealing dog-breed specific legislation, inclusionary housing, and safe bicycle passing guidelines. She also co-sponsored an all-party bill, that became law, calling for the commemoration of the Ukrainian genocide known as the Holodomor on the 15th of November each year in Ontario.

=== 40th Parliament election and sessions ===
DiNovo ran for re-election in the 2011 Ontario general election. Her main opponent was the Liberal Party candidate Courtney Pasternak. Indications from polling in the summer suggested that Pasternak might win; but on election day, DiNovo easily won re-election. Like other districts bordering on the rail link to Pearson Airport from Union Station, she successfully made the project's potential environmental impact on the community as the main issue in the campaign, by coming out against the Liberal's proposal to first use diesel trains and then eventually electrify the line at some future date.

=== 41st Parliament election and sessions ===
DiNovo was narrowly re-elected in the June 2014 election. She defeated Liberal candidate Nancy Leblanc by 525 votes. She avoided the Liberal success in Toronto that saw three out of four other NDP incumbents go down to defeat.

As of July 2014, she was the party's caucus chair and the critic for urban transportation, LGBTQ, and Greater Toronto Area issues. She became the first ever LGBTQ critic in Ontario; former Xtra! journalist Andrea Houston was a staffer.

DiNovo has been an outspoken advocate for cyclist and cyclist safety, including her "one-meter rule", which the government finally passed as part of their larger transport bill in 2015.

In 2015 DiNovo's Bill 77, which prohibits conversion therapy for youth (therapy intended to prevent young people from identifying as LGBTQ) passed and became law. The legislation also delisted conversion therapy from OHIP. Following the introduction of the bill, President Barack Obama called for a ban of the practice in the United States. Manitoba has tabled legislation to ban the practice as well.

DiNovo also tabled Bill 137, Cy and Ruby's Act (Parental Recognition), 2015 which seeks to amend the Children's Law Reform Act and the Vital Statistics Act to be more LGBTQ inclusive so that LGBTQ parents are also recognized as parents under the law. In December 2015, Bill 137 passed Second Reading with all party support and is currently waiting to be reviewed by the standing committee on regulations and private bills.

DiNovo successfully proposed a bill to recognize Post-Traumatic Stress Disorder (PTSD) as a workplace injury for first responders fast-tracking their Workplace Safety and Insurance Board benefits. After seven years, four bills and one second reading, the government introduced legislation in February 2016.

Similarly, DiNovo tabled her bill on inclusionary zoning (for affordable housing) five times over eight years, passing second reading twice. In May 2016, the government introduced housing legislation that included inclusionary zoning.

In a 2017 episode of the television series Political Blind Date, DiNovo and Marie-France Lalonde discussed their differing perspectives on the issue of criminal justice and corrections.

=== Federal party leadership bid ===
In the wake of the October 2015 federal election, in which the federal NDP fell from second to third place, DiNovo was critical of Tom Mulcair's leadership of the federal NDP and of what she viewed as the party's centrist course under his leadership. DiNovo openly supported a leadership review of Mulcair's stewardship of the federal party at the party's April 2016 convention and called for the NDP to reaffirm its socialist principles. After Mulcair was defeated in the leadership review, DiNovo announced she would run as an "unofficial candidate" in the 2017 federal NDP leadership election on June 7, 2016, rather than pay the required fee of $30,000. She also announced that she would not seek re-election to the Ontario legislature in the 2018 provincial election. However, on June 13, 2016, she announced that her candidacy would be moving from unofficial status to official status, stating that her campaign would begin fundraising when the party finalized the leadership election rules in July 2016. DiNovo announced on August 2, 2016, that she was withdrawing from the race for health reasons after having recently suffered two small strokes. She later endorsed Manitoba MP Niki Ashton's campaign.

== Post-political career ==
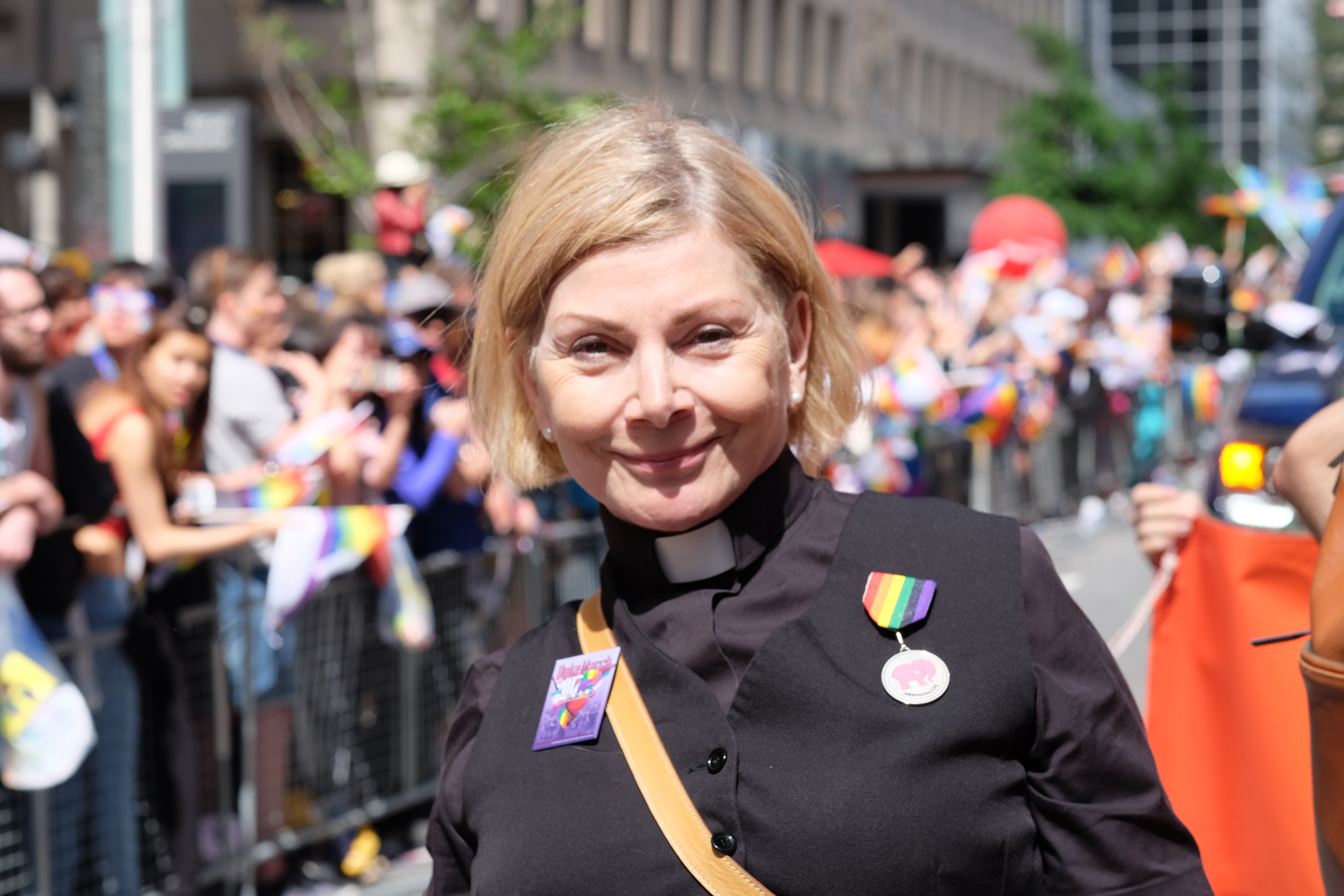
DiNovo at Pride Toronto in 2017

DiNovo announced that she would not seek re-election in the 2018 provincial election and resigned her seat in the legislature at the end of 2017. She became the minister of the Trinity-St. Paul's Centre for Faith, Justice and the Arts effective January 1, 2018 and continues to present the Radical Reverend program on CIUT-FM radio.

In 2021 she published the memoir The Queer Evangelist.

In 2026, DiNovo endorsed Avi Lewis in that year's federal NDP leadership race.

== Awards ==
- Best MPP 2017 & 2015, NOW Magazine (2014 Best MPP Runner-Up)
- Lambda Literary Award, 2005 in the Spirituality category for her book Qu(e)erying Evangelism
- Award of Merit by the government of Ukraine for her work on Canada's first tri-party bill recognizing the Holodomor as genocide
- Lifetime Achievement Award at the 2015 Inspire Awards for her lifelong work as an activist for equal rights
- Bicycling Leadership Award from the Share the Road Cycling Coalition
- Community Hero Award from Jer's Vision
- Rainbow Health Advocate Award from Rainbow Health Ontario
- History Maker Award from Brockville Pride
- PFLAG Ally Award, presented by Rosie O'Donnell
- Appointed a Member of the Order of Canada in 2019 for her contributions to provincial politics and for her lifelong advocacy of social justice

== Electoral record ==
2014 Ontario general election: Parkdale—High Park
Party	Candidate	Votes	%	±%
New Democratic	Cheri DiNovo	18,385	40.77	-5.43
Liberal	Nancy Leblanc	17,841	39.56	+2.14
Progressive Conservative	Jamie Ellerton	5,787	12.83	+1.09
Green	Tim Rudkins	2,479	5.50	+2.17
None of the Above	Matthew Vezina	305	0.68	–
Libertarian	Redmond Weissenberger	191	0.42	-0.01
Freedom	Melanie Motz	105	0.23	–
Total valid votes		45,093	100.0	
Total rejected, unmarked and declined ballots		262	1.06	
Turnout		45,576	56.88	
Eligible voters		80,122		
New Democratic hold		Swing		-3.79
Source(s) Elections Ontario (2014). "Official Past Election Results".

2011 Ontario general election
Party	Candidate	Votes	%	±%
New Democratic	Cheri DiNovo	18,365	46.20	+1.57
Liberal	Cortney Pasternak	14,877	37.42	+8.13
Progressive Conservative	Joe Ganetakos	4,668	11.74	-3.06
Green	Justin Trottier	1,325	3.33	-6.36
Libertarian	Rod Rojas	172	0.43	-0.37
Independent	Bohdan Ewhen Radejewsky	88	0.22	
Independent	George Babula	84	0.21	
Independent	Cecilia Luu	78	0.20	
People's Political Party	Thomas Zaugg	56	0.14	
Independent	Istvan Tar	39	0.10	
Total valid votes		39,752	100.00	
Total rejected, unmarked and declined ballots		81	0.20	
Turnout		39,959	51.79	
Eligible voters		77,163		
New Democratic hold		Swing		-3.28
Source: Elections Ontario

2007 Ontario general election
Party	Candidate	Votes	%	±%
New Democratic	Cheri DiNovo	18,136	44.63	+3.59
Liberal	Sylvia Watson	11,900	29.29	-3.7
Progressive Conservative	David Hutcheon	6,013	14.80	-2.49
Green	Bruce Hearns	3,937	9.69	+3.53
Libertarian	Zork Hun	327	0.80	+0.23
Family Coalition	Marilee Kidd	322	0.79	-0.5
Total valid votes		40,635	100.0	

Ontario provincial by-election, September 14, 2006 Resignation of Gerard Kennedy
Party	Candidate	Votes	%	±%
New Democratic	Cheri DiNovo	11,677	41.04	+25.27
Liberal	Sylvia Watson	9,387	32.99	-24.84
Progressive Conservative	David Hutcheon	4,921	17.29	+1.11
Green	Frank De Jong	1,753	6.16	-0.77
Family Coalition	Stan Grzywna	367	1.29	-0.2
Libertarian	Jim McIntosh	162	0.57	
Freedom	Silvio Ursomarzo	111	0.39	-0.02
Independent	John Turmel	78	0.27	
Total valid votes		28,456	100.0	
Source: Elections Ontario
