= Wilbur K. Howard =

Canadian church minister (1912–2001)

The Very Reverend Wilbur Kenneth Howard OOnt
- 26th Moderator of the United Church of Canada
- Church: United Church of Canada
- In office: 1974-1977
- Predecessor: Bruce McLeod
- Successor: George M. Tuttle

Orders
- Ordination: 1941 by Toronto Conference

Personal details
- Born: February 29, 1912 Toronto, Ontario
- Died: April 17, 2001 (aged 89) Toronto, Ontario
- Profession: Minister
- Education: Victoria College, Toronto; Emmanuel College, Toronto; Union Theological Seminary; University of Winnipeg

Wilbur Kenneth Howard OOnt (February 29, 1912 - April 17, 2001) was the first black person to be ordained as a minister in the United Church of Canada and, in 1974, became the denomination's first black moderator. He was elected Moderator after the fifth ballot during the meeting of the 26th General Council in Guelph, Ontario. To date, he is the only black person to hold this position within the United Church of Canada.

== Early life ==
Howard was born on February 29, 1912, in the Davenport neighbourhood of Toronto, Ontario. He was a third or fourth-generation Canadian, while his parents, James and Mary, were most likely the descendants of African Canadian or African American enslaved people. Both his father and brother were railway porters and Howard himself described his mother as a "great church person" who was very active in missionary work within the British Methodist Episcopal Church. He received his early education at Brock Public School and Bloor Collegiate Institute.

Despite the cultural expectations of the time that as a black person he would work in the labour industry, Howard continued with his education and eventually earned a B.A. from Victoria College in 1938. He went on to earn a Bachelor of Divinity from Emmanuel College, becoming the first black person to graduate from that theological school in 1941. During his time at Emmanuel College, Howard, experienced different treatment due to his skin colour, including being unable to complete his student field placements. While he spent his summers volunteering at United Church camps and, once, working at the Fred Victor Mission, his fellow students took up various mission and ministry posts within local congregations, as was usual at the time. In a 1974 article in The United Church Observer, Howard's former classmates admitted the reason for this was that "the Home Mission secretary of the time was afraid he would be rejected from a charge because of his colour." Later in 1941, Howard was ordained by the Toronto Conference of the United Church of Canada, making history once again as the first black person to be ordained in the United Church. He finally obtained a position as a co-minister in 1965 at the Dominion-Chalmers United Church in Ottawa. Five years later, Howard went on to lead a church of his own, Emmanuel United, which is also in the nation’s capital. They intentionally called him, and they loved him there. He remained until his retirement in 1981.

== Ministry ==
Howard's first experience of the United Church came when he was invited by a neighbouring white family to attend with them. This became a regular part of Howard's early life and eventually led to his calling to the ministry. "The result", writes Adam Kilner in one of his biographies of Howard, "was his calling into the ministry of a segregated church at a segregated time, even in polite Canada."

Religious titles
Preceded by Bruce McLeod	Moderator of the United Church of Canada; 1974–1977	Succeeded by George M. Tuttle
