= Wilfred Lockhart =

The Very Reverend Wilfred Cornett Lockhart

22nd Moderator of the United Church of Canada
- In office 1966–1968
- Preceded by: Ernest M. Howse
- Succeeded by: Robert Baird McClure

1st President of the University of Winnipeg
- In office 1967–1971
- Succeeded by: Henry Duckworth

Personal details
- Born: October 17, 1906 Dundalk, Ontario
- Died: October 16, 1991 (aged 84) Etobicoke, Ontario
- Spouse(s): Margaret Eileen Armstrong; Anne Chorney
- Children: 1 son, 1 daughter
- Education: Victoria College; University of Toronto; University of Edinburgh
- Profession: Minister; Chaplain; University administrator

Wilfred Cornett Lockhart (October 17, 1906 – October 16, 1991) was a Canadian United Church of Canada minister, chaplain and academic administrator. He was the first President of the University of Winnipeg from 1967 to 1971 and was Moderator of the United Church of Canada from 1966 to 1968.

== Life ==
Lockhart was born in Dundalk, Ontario, on October 17, 1906, to Tom and Harriet Lockhart. In 1926, he moved to Toronto and attended Victoria College, graduating with a Bachelor of Arts in 1929. He remained at the University of Toronto to earn his M.A. in 1932. Lockhart married Margaret Armstrong on September 20, 1933, and the couple then moved to Edinburgh, Scotland, where Lockhart attended the University of Edinburgh, and completed his Ph.D. in 1936. During his time in Edinburgh, Lockhart served as the student minister of North Leith Parish Church.

Upon returning to Canada, Lockhart became the secretary of the Student Christian Movement of Canada and chaplain to the University of Toronto Canadian Officer Training Corps, a position he held until 1946. Beginning in the 1940s, he served two United Churches: Sherbourne Street United from 1940–1942 and Kingsway-Lambton United from 1942 until 1955.

Lockhart was principal of United College in Winnipeg, Manitoba, from 1955 to 1967, when it received its charter and became the University of Winnipeg, and was subsequently the president of the University of Winnipeg until his retirement in 1971. Under his tenure, the college's downtown campus substantially expanded with the construction of several new buildings.

In 1958, Lockhart instigated the Crowe Case, which served as a catalyst for the development of national policy protecting the rights of academic freedom and the status of tenure in Canadian higher education. Lockhart obtained a letter critical of the religious and academic environment at United College, written by United College history professor Harry S. Crowe to his colleague William Packer. Lockhart kept the letter and disseminated copies of it; Crowe was subsequently fired on the grounds of his incompatibility with the avowed purposes of the College. Hostile negotiations between Crowe and Lockhart gained national attention, and the newly formed Canadian Association of University Teachers eventually ruled that Crowe's dismissal was "an unjust and unwarranted invasion of the security of academic tenure to which he was entitled." Lockhart offered to resign over the issue, but his resignation was not accepted.

Lockhart served as the chairman of the Board of Colleges and Schools of the United Church of Canada from 1946–1955 and was elected Moderator of the United Church of Canada at their 7th General Council in Waterloo, Ontario, in 1966 and served in this position until 1968.

He is the author of In Such an Age: Younger Voices in the Canadian Church (1951). He was inducted into the Manitoba Order of the Buffalo Hunt in 1971.

Upon retiring from active ministry and his position at the University of Winnipeg, Lockhart moved to Etobicoke, Ontario. His first wife died in 1986 and Lockhart remarried in 1988, to Anne Chorney. Lockhart died in Etobicoke on October 16, 1991, at the age of 84.

Religious titles
Preceded by Ernest M. Howse	Moderator of the United Church of Canada; 1966–1968	Succeeded by Robert Baird McClure
Academic offices
Preceded by New Position	President of the University of Winnipeg; 1967–1971	Succeeded by Henry Duckworth
