= Robert Baird McClure =

Moderator of the United Church of Canada (1968–1971) and missionary doctor

Robert Baird McClure CC OOnt FRCS (Edin.) FICS
- 23rd Moderator of the United Church of Canada
- Church: United Church of Canada
- In office: 1968–1971
- Predecessor: Wilfred C. Lockhart
- Successor: Arthur B. B. Moore

Personal details
- Born: November 23, 1900 Portland, Oregon
- Died: November 10, 1991 (aged 90) Toronto, Ontario
- Spouse: Amy Hislop
- Profession: Physician
- Education: University of Toronto; McGill University

Robert Baird "Bob" McClure CC OOnt FRCS (Edin.) FICS (November 23, 1900 – November 10, 1991) was a Canadian physician, medical missionary to China, Taiwan, Gaza, India, and Borneo, and was also the 23rd Moderator of the United Church of Canada, the first unordained lay person to hold that position. During a very active life, McClure became friends with Soong Mei-ling and Chiang Kai-shek, crossed paths with Norman Bethune, was one of the first men to drive a vehicle along the Burma Road, parachuted into jungle valleys to save downed pilots, was threatened with imprisonment by Canadian prime minister William Lyon MacKenzie King, and was almost summarily executed as a spy by Japanese soldiers. He was finally forced to retire as a missionary doctor at age 67, but then spent his first two years of "retirement" as head of the United Church of Canada, and another nine years as a short-term missionary doctor around the world. During the 1960s and 1970s, the forthright and plain-spoken McClure was one of the most recognizable and most-quoted men in Canada.

== Early life ==
Bob McClure's father, Dr. William McClure, was born in Lachute, Quebec, and earned a medical degree under William Osler at McGill University. William's wife, Margaret (nee Baird) McClure, was born in Pennsylvania. Together, the two became missionaries at a Presbyterian mission in Wuhan, China in 1888.

The Boxer Rebellion of 1900 forced the McClures and their two young daughters to evacuate to the port of Shanghai, although Margaret was three months pregnant. From Shanghai, they parted ways. William joined the medical unit of HMS Centurion under the command of Captain John Jellicoe, which was headed for Beijing as part of the Seymour Expedition. Margaret and her daughters sailed to North America on the SS Shinano Maru, landing at Portland, Oregon, where her son Bob was born on November 23, 1900. By 1901, the Boxer Rebellion had been suppressed, and the McClures were reunited in Weihui, where the Presbyterian Church had established a new mission.

Bob McClure grew up in the Weihui compound. Despite his red hair and quick temper, he quickly made friendships with Chinese playmates, and could speak both English and Mandarin by an early age. His father soon made a rule that Bob could speak Chinese outside, but had to speak English while inside the family household.

In 1910, William took a two-year sabbatical and returned with his family to North America, staying with Margaret's relatives in Wooster, Ohio. In 1912, when William was scheduled to return to Weihui, the family made the decision that William and 11-year-old Bob would return to China, while Margaret would stay in North America with her daughters as they completed their primary and high school studies.

After three more years in China, William returned with Bob to North America for another sabbatical, and the family reunited in Toronto, where Bob's two sisters were enrolled at school, Janet at the University of Toronto, and Margaret at Harbord Collegiate Institute. Bob was also enrolled at Harbord, and during his first summer in Toronto, he worked at the Russell Motor Car Company, making munitions for the Canadian Expeditionary Force fighting in the First World War. The next summer, he worked on a farm as part of the "Soldiers of the Soil" program.

== University ==
In the fall of 1917, Bob enrolled in medicine at the University of Toronto, working evenings and weekends as a stevedore at the Toronto docks or a baggage handler at Union Station to earn enough to pay his tuition. He also attended Bloor Street Church, where he was greatly influenced by the sermons of Dr. George C. Pigeon, who would go on to become the first Moderator of the United Church of Canada in 1925.

In 1920, Bob met Amy Hislop and the two started to date. In 1922, McClure graduated with his medical degree, and was planning to do post-graduate surgical work at Harvard University before joining the British Colonial Service. He was approached by George Pidgeon, who asked McClure if he would instead consider travelling to Qinyang, China to replace the doctor at the Presbyterian mission hospital who had been killed by bandits. When McClure pointed out that he would need twelve months of surgical training, Pidgeon arranged for McClure to work with Dr. Kenneth Perfect at Western Hospital in Toronto for a year.

== China missionary ==
McClure arrived in China in early 1924. Since he could speak Mandarin but could neither read nor write Chinese characters, he enrolled in Chinese language school for several months. McClure then travelled to Qinyang to take up his post as mission doctor at the Menzies Memorial Hospital. The following year, with the formation of the United Church of Canada from the union of the Presbyterian, Methodist and Congregationalist Churches, the hospital and mission became a United Church charge.

In 1926, Bob asked a colleague travelling to Toronto to present Amy Hislop with his marriage proposal; Amy said yes, and the two met later that year in Tianjin to be married. Bob returned to Qinyang with his new bride, but less than a year later full civil war broke out between the Kuomintang, Communists and Nationalists, forcing Bob and his pregnant wife to flee to Tianjin.

McClure relocated to a Presbyterian mission hospital in Taipei on the Japanese-occupied island of Taiwan. There he worked with a highly trained Canadian doctor, George Gushue-Taylor, FRCS (Edin). McClure, with his single year of basic surgical training, later recalled in a conversation with medical historian Charles Gordon Roland that "[Gushue-Taylor] was certainly, academically, the highest trained surgeon we had had up to then. I don't think we've had anybody since then, any higher, with his academic training. He had come out of University College Hospital, in London, with gold medals in gynecology, I remember, and gold medals, I believe, in surgical anatomy, and things like this. Really, a very highly qualified man." Despite his Canadian background, Gushue-Taylor acted very properly British, and discouraged social casualness of any kind. Gushue-Taylor had been in Taipei since 1911, and had learned the language well enough that he had co-authored a 1917 Taiwanese-language nursing manual, Lāi-goā-kho Khàn-hō͘-ha̍k. Gushue-Taylor was very critical of McClure's Canadian medical education — as McClure recalled, "he immediately told me what a terrible education I'd had in Canada. That ideally you couldn't get any good medical course in Canada. He was right in this respect, that the ordinary Canadian medical student had not spent the time on the basic stuff of anatomy. Simply, in anatomy we did not know our anatomy the way the English medical student knew his. We did not know our basic pathology. We did not know our medical pathology the way he did." So Gushue-Taylor took McClure back to school, insisting he read medical texts about the cases he was treating, questioning McClure afterwards, and casting doubt that McClure could ever hope to earn his FRCS degree from the prestigious Royal College of Surgeons of Edinburgh.

In addition to his medical work, McClure started to learn the Amoy dialect so he could speak directly with his patients, and he also learned some rudimentary Japanese for his dealings with local occupation authorities. Two children were born to the McClures during their time in Taiwan.

After three years of education and prodding by Gushue-Taylor, McClure made the decision to earn his FRCS degree. In 1930, while Amy and the children travelled to Toronto, McClure journeyed to the UK to commence his studies. After several months of surgical training and study at Chelsea Hospital, McClure failed the FRCS exam. He rejoined his family in Canada and studied surgery for several more months at Toronto General Hospital. He then re-took the FRCS exam in Toronto in the spring of 1931 but for a second time, he failed. He immediately travelled to Edinburgh to sit for the summer exam, and this time, he passed.

During his studies in Edinburgh, McClure had learned about the use of radium in cancer treatments. At the time, radium was very expensive, costing £15,000 per gram. In preparation for a return to the mission hospital at Qinyang, McClure raised enough money to buy a few micrograms of radium. One of his donors was diplomat Vincent Massey. McClure was the second missionary doctor in the world to buy radium (the first being the Canadian doctor William James Wanless for the Miraj Medical Centre in India.)

The family moved back to Qinyang in late 1931. In the next two years, the McClure family expanded with the arrival of two more children. In 1934, McClure travelled to Europe for five months to study the latest developments in the use of radiation treatments for cancer.

In 1937, McClure became the Field Director for the International Red Cross (IRC), and in this role, tried to convince all the factions vying for control of central China to allow for the free movement of medical supplies and treatment of wounded soldiers. During one of these attempts, he was detained by Japanese soldiers as a spy, and was only saved from immediate execution by the intervention of a Japanese officer who had worked with McClure on rural reconstruction. As the situation deteriorated in China, Amy returned to Canada with their children, and bought a house in Toronto, the first house that the McClures had owned. McClure's father, William McClure, now 84, moved in with Amy and the children.

On February 23, 1938, McClure crossed paths with fellow Canadian doctor Norman Bethune, who was travelling to join Communist forces at Shanxi. McClure biographer Munro Scott characterized the meeting as unpleasant, saying, "Dr. McClure had found Dr. Bethune to be very anti-Canadian, paranoic about his thoracic work, too militantly communist, and bitter." It was the only meeting of the two Canadian doctors — 18 months later Bethune would die from blood poisoning contracted while performing combat surgery.

Later that spring, McClure had to abandon attempts to negotiate with the Japanese forces in China when he learned they had placed a bounty of US$50,000 on his head. Through his work with the IRC, he did meet Soong Mei-ling, wife of Kuomintang leader Chiang Kai-shek. McClure developed a friendship with both of them, and a few months later Soong Mei-Ling asked McClure to travel to England to speak at a World Red Cross Conference on behalf of the Kuomintang's Central China Committee.

With the situation in China deteriorating, McClure was unable to return to his work, so he reunited with his family in Toronto and filled his time doing fundraising tours of the United States and Europe for the IRC before attending a world missionary conference in Madras, India. While there, McClure was told about the Burma Road that had just been completed by the British to connect Rangoon, Burma to Kunming, China. Seeing this as a potential way to get medical supplies into China for the IRC while bypassing Chinese ports blocked by warring factions, McClure decided to test it, and became only the third person to drive a car the length of the road. McClure set out to organize regular relief convoys along the road.

In late 1939, McClure was pinned between two trucks, suffering several serious injuries, and travelled back to Canada to convalesce. While there, he made several public speeches in which he accused the Canadian government of allowing nickel to be exported through various clandestine channels to Japan, which was then using it for war munitions against China. On December 7, 1940, McClure was summoned to a meeting in Ottawa with the prime minister, William Lyon MacKenzie King. Although King admitted to McClure that Canadian nickel was making its way to Japan in greater amounts than even McClure had suspected, King ordered McClure to recant his speeches or face arrest for subversive activities under the Defence of Canada Regulations and the War Measures Act. Realizing he could not help China or the IRC from prison, McClure unhappily sat down with Under-secretary of State Norman Robertson to craft a letter of apology.

In April 1941, McClure was approached by the Quaker organization Friends' Ambulance Unit (FAU) to move medical supplies and surgical teams into China along the Burma Road while evacuating wounded. McClure immediately left for Asia, and quickly set up what became known as the "China Convoy."

By 1942, McClure's abilities, knowledge of the Chinese people and friendship with Chiang Kai-shek came to the attention of Vincent Massey, previously one of McClure's donors of funds for radium, and at the time Canada's High Commissioner in the UK. Massey sent a telegram to Norman Robertson in Ottawa suggesting McClure would be an ideal candidate as "Canadian Minister to China." But Roberston reminded Prime Minister King of the "thoroughly unsatisfactory business" they had experienced with McClure two years previous, and King noted "I wouldn't consider him."

In addition to his organizational work, McClure also handled surgery at the hospital at Baoshan. The issue of how to rescue injured Allied pilots who had been forced to land in remote Himalayan valleys came to the attention of McClure. He had learned how to parachute in Toronto, and several times parachuted into remote locations in order to give first aid and organize transportation of injured pilots out to the Burma Road, where they could be evacuated.

During this time, McClure's friendship with Chiang Kai-shek and Soong Mei-ling came to end when Soong Mei-ling demanded that medical supplies coming up the Burma Road not be used on wounded Communist soldiers, which McClure refused to consider.

In 1945, as the Japanese withdrew from northern China, McClure organized medical relief operations for the province of Hunan. In June 1946, with the wartime FAU morphing into the peacetime Friends Service Unit, McClure opened a United Church mission hospital in Hankou and spent two years there.

In 1948, the Communist faction under Mao Zedong swept across China, driving the Kuomintang off-shore to Taiwan. Although McClure was willing to stay in China during the Communist takeover and try to negotiate his medical services with the new regime, he was suddenly called back to Canada due to the critical illness of one of his daughters.

== Toronto surgeon ==
By the time McClure's daughter had recovered, the Communist takeover of China was complete, and McClure found himself locked out of China due to his former friendship with Chiang Kai-shek and Soong Mei-ling. With his life's work in China now finished, McClure found himself living in his own home in Toronto with Amy, his children and his father. Deciding that his days of high adventure were over, McClure looked for a medical opportunity in the Toronto area, but decided that opening his own surgical practice would take too long to establish. Instead, he accepted an invitation to join a medical group practice as the consulting surgeon and gynaecologist. However, after his adventure-filled life, family practice in the safe and quiet Toronto area left him "irritable and frustrated." McClure felt the need to be a missionary doctor again, and learned that the United Church of Canada's Board of Overseas Missions was in need of doctors in central India. McClure accepted a posting to Ratlam, but this time the rest of the family would stay in Toronto — the children were in high school, and Amy would also be able to watch over McClure's father, now in his late 80s, still mentally sharp but physically frail. Before the Board of Overseas Missions could complete the lengthy arrangements, McClure received word from the Church Missionary Society (CMS) of an urgent need for a surgeon in the Gaza Strip. The Board of Overseas Missions agreed to "loan" McClure to the CMS for a few months while arrangements for his work in India were slowly completed.

== Gaza ==
In 1950, McClure arrived in Cairo for a brief time of acclimatization at the Harpur Memorial Hospital. In the spring of 1951, McClure arrived at the CMS mission hospital in Gaza, with the plan to leave for India in six months. It had only been three years since the First Arab–Israeli War, and the Gaza Strip was under the control of Egypt. McClure, who had been known in China has the missionary doctor who dressed in shorts and rode a bicycle, adopted the same customs in Gaza, making him, once again, stand out not only from the Gazans, but also from the other hospital staff. As he had done in China, McClure began to train laboratory and X-ray technicians. In the 1950s, his "graduates" would go into the surrounding regions to open vital laboratories for UNRWA and other aid organizations.

In his China days, McClure the missionary doctor would start the first operation of the day with a prayer. In Gaza, a local sheik required a knee operation, but was terrified. To calm him, McClure said a short prayer in both Arabic and English before the operation. Afterwards, the sheik made McClure promise he would not only pray before his first operation of each day, but before every operation. McClure kept that promise for the rest of his surgical career.

CMS was having trouble finding a permanent replacement for McClure, and six months became a year, and then a second year. In April 1952, his wife Amy, still in Toronto looking after McClure's father, was diagnosed with advanced cancer that needed immediate surgery. It was a Friday evening and all banks were closed when the telegram reached McClure. With little money, he finagled his way onto a UN plane leaving for Beirut. He then paid for a flight to Paris on the strength of a promissory note, and did the same for a flight from London to Montreal. Catching a train in Montreal, he arrived in Toronto 48 hours after receiving the telegram, just before Amy was to enter surgery.

The surgery was successful, and while Amy was recovering, McClure entered into a negotiation with the CMS, who now wanted McClure to return to Gaza on a permanent basis. McClure reminded CMS that he was technically on loan to them from the United Church of Canada's Board of Overseas Missions, and he was still expected to travel to India for them. But McClure agreed to return to Gaza for one more year, until December 1953, unless he could be released from his Gaza work any sooner. Given the difficulty in finding a CMS surgeon willing to travel to Gaza, McClure urged the CMS to find another mission that might want to take over responsibility for the hospital.

Amy recovered rapidly, and agreed to travel with McClure to Gaza to finish her recovery. They arrived just before Christmas 1952. Amy returned to Toronto in May 1953, and McClure began urgently searching for another mission to take over the CMS hospital, eventually finding a Southern Baptist group willing to step in.

== India ==
McClure immediately flew from Gaza to India to finally take up his post at Ratlam Christian Hospital, a 100-bed facility with an X-ray room. McClure was initially excited, but soon realized the hospital had not seen any new equipment in over twenty years, and the buildings in the compound were dilapidated. In addition, there was friction among several members of the medical staff — as well as a certain lack of skill — and McClure had to suggest to several that they seek employment elsewhere before he was satisfied that he had a staff with whom he could work.

McClure was also critical of other the mission hospitals in the area, calling their work "low in quality and quantity." He pointed out that seven hospitals shared one working X-ray machine, but it had been used fewer times during the entire year of 1953 than his Gaza hospital's X-ray machine was used in one week.

People back in Canada heard about McClure's work, and began to donate funds in his name to the Board of Overseas Missions. The Board set these aside as the "McClure Fund", and disbursed them to McClure whenever he needed money for his next project.

In the spring of 1956, after three years at Ratlam, McClure took a furlough and travelled back to Canada in time to help his father, William McClure, celebrate his 100th birthday, which would fall on 9 April 1956. The producers of the CBC-TV program Tabloid wanted to interview William about his life, and asked Bob to be the interviewer. The program aired shortly before William's birthday. Three months later, while Bob was still on furlough, the elderly McClure died peacefully in his sleep.

Bob returned to Ratlam in the fall of 1956, and for the first time since their time together in Taiwan, Amy came to live with him permanently.

The hospital had only been used for minor surgery before his arrival, but now he set out to make it a centre of major surgery as well as a treatment centre for bone fractures. McClure also set up a medical lab, and started a program to train people as basic lab technicians. After four months of training, each technician was sent back to their village able to handle basic lab procedures such as blood counts and slide smears. In order to combat tuberculosis in children, McClure started a fluoroscope screening program. McClure also added polio immunization programs, family planning and contraception, and cancer-fighting Cobalt bomb machines to his overall medical health program.

In 1966, a CBC film crew came to visit McClure. The result was a sudden wave of information about Bob McClure back in Canada. On 1 September 1966, CBC-TV aired a colour television special, Dr. Bob McClure: Medical Missionary about his life and work in Ratlam; it was only CBC's second colour program to air. During the program, McClure talked about the reason he sought missionary work: "One of the great motivations in missionary work is the spirit of adventure. I would define adventure as being risk with a purpose, as distinct from simply risk of weaving at high speed through crowded traffic. That sort of risk with purpose gives you adventure and a good feeling, a thrill... and a very good feeling when it is all over." In terms of the suffering he saw around him, McClure said, "Sure there are things you meet that make you feel very deeply, but emotionalism must be expressed in long-term determination, not in fluffy sentimentality." Two days after the TV program aired, Star Weekly published a feature article by the film's producer, Dale Barnes. Two weeks later, Maclean's published another full-length article by the film's writer, Kenneth Bagnall.

The United Church Board of Overseas Missions reminded McClure that he would reach their retirement age of 67 in the fall of 1967. After a stay of 13 years at Ratlam, McClure stepped down in November 1967. Hundreds of people descended on the train station as Bob and Amy left Ratlam for the final time.

== Moderator ==
As McClure arrived back in Canada in early 1968, discontent was starting to ripple through the United Church of Canada. With a million adult members, it was the largest Protestant denomination in Canada, and the spiritual head of the church since its founding in 1925, the moderator, had always been an ordained minister, although there was no rule against a lay person being elected. But in the late 1960s, Canadian author Pierre Berton, in his 1966 book The Comfortable Pew, called the hierarchy of the mainline denominations in Canada too staid, the clergy too interested in liturgy rather than engagement with issues of social justice. With images of Bob McClure, the plain-spoken mission doctor from India who turned prayers into actions, fresh in their minds, several asked McClure if he would be interested in running for the post of moderator at the upcoming 23rd General Council. McClure allowed his name to be put forward, and at the General Council held in Kingston, Ontario in August 1968, McClure survived five rounds of balloting, defeating Rev. Bruce McLeod in the final round of voting to become moderator. (McLeod would be elected as moderator 4 years later.)

McClure was the first layperson to hold that office but was not overwhelmed by the thought, pointing out, "In appointing a layman as a Moderator in a General Council with probably 50 expert theologians present, it’s obvious the United Church didn't want theological views. They appointed a layman as Moderator presumably because they wanted a clear view of the relationship of the Canadian citizen to the needs of a very shrinking world."

During his three-year term, McClure was not afraid to espouse controversial views not supported by church policy, admitting in an interview three months after his election "my tongue has already gotten me in a little hot water." Some of the items that quickly made headlines included McClure's support for legalized abortion, acceptance of American draft dodgers, sex education, family planning and contraception, worship services on days other than Sunday, shorter (or no) sermons during church services, and accepting credit cards for offerings. At a time when the United Church moderator was a highly influential person in Canada, McClure made himself freely available for newspaper, radio and television interviews. He travelled more widely than any moderator to date, crisscrossing Canada to meet with congregations. He and Amy travelled to Scotland to mark the 200th anniversary of the General Assembly of the Presbyterian Church, as well as to Kenya, Zambia, Angola and South Africa. McClure also travelled to the Middle East. Back in Canada, his biographer, Munro Scott noted that he spoke to hundreds of groups including, "students, health leagues, service clubs, Bible societies, family planning groups, presbyteries, medical conventions, Anglicans, Catholics, Zionists, relief organizations, cancer symposiums and (via the media) the general public."

In January 1971, at the end of his two-year term, McClure stepped down as moderator, succeeded by Arthur B.B. Moore.

== Doctor again ==
McClure's "retirement" became an opportunity to travel the world and use his medical skills on a voluntary basis. The 70-year-old first travelled to Southeast Asia as an OXFAM volunteer to do a family planning survey. This included a route that took him to Hong Kong, Korea, South Vietnam, Pakistan, India, Thailand, Indonesia and the Philippines before finishing in England to give him report at the annual OXFAM conference.

He then accepted a two-year medical position at a Methodist mission hospital in Sarawak, accompanied by Amy. In 1975, he travelled to the Amazon Basin of Peru to inoculate river communities. In 1977, he worked as a volunteer surgeon in Kimpese, Zaire. When he returned, McClure declared that he was retiring from missionary work.

== Retirement ==
In 1978, as his last medical work, McClure treated patients at a United Church clinic in Fort Simpson, British Columbia.

In 1979, at age 78, McClure settled down in Toronto, but was a frequent public speaker, averaging 15 speeches a month. He also led annual tourist groups to some of his former locations in China, India, the Burma Road, and Borneo. The McClure Fund continued to receive money, and McClure tried to keep abreast of the latest medical developments in the missionary field so that money could be used most efficiently.

At age 90, he was diagnosed with inoperable pancreatic cancer, and died on November 9, 1991.

== Awards and recognition ==
- Companion of the Order of Canada, 1971. "For his services to humanity, particularly as a medical missionary."
- On 7 December 1978, with Bob and Amy McClure in the visitors' gallery, the Ontario Legislature moved to Private Members' Public Business. The first resolution, by Robert Nixon resolved "That this House recognizes the outstanding achievements of Dr. Robert McClure whose life of service at home, in China and elsewhere in the world exemplifies the most commendable aspects of the human spirit." For the next 75 minutes, members from all parties spoke at length about McClure's accomplishments. At the end of that time, Nixon's resolution was passed unanimously.
- Man of the Year Peace Award of the Lester B. Pearson Peace Park, 1985.
- Member of the Order of Ontario, 1990.
- Two United Churches in Canada are named for McClure:
  - McClure United Church in Saskatoon, Saskatchewan. (An intermediate care facility built next to the church in 2005 was named Amy McClure House after Bob McClure's wife.)
  - Robert McClure United Church in Calgary, Alberta

Religious titles
Preceded by Wilfred C. Lockhart	Moderator of the United Church of Canada; 1968–1971	Succeeded by Arthur B. B. Moore
