= Arthur B. B. Moore =

Canadian minister

The Very Reverend Arthur B. B. Moore OC

26th Chancellor of the University of Toronto
- In office 1977–1980
- President: John Robert Evans; James Milton Ham
- Preceded by: Eva Mader Macdonald
- Succeeded by: George Ignatieff

24th Moderator of the United Church of Canada
- In office 1971–1972
- Preceded by: Robert Baird McClure
- Succeeded by: Bruce McLeod

7th President and Vice-Chancellor of Victoria University, Toronto
- In office 1950–1970
- Chancellor: Alexander Charles Spencer; Lester B. Pearson; Louis Orville Breithaupt
- Preceded by: Harold Bennett
- Succeeded by: John Hodgetts

Personal details
- Born: February 4, 1906 Keswick Ridge, New Brunswick
- Died: September 9, 2004 (aged 98) Toronto
- Education: McGill University; Oxford University
- Profession: Minister, Educator
- Church: United Church of Canada
- Predecessor: Robert Baird McClure
- Successor: Bruce McLeod

Arthur Bruce Barbour Moore OC (February 4, 1906 – September 9, 2004) was an ordained minister of the United Church of Canada who served as president and vice-chancellor of Victoria University in the University of Toronto, Chancellor of the University of Toronto, and as the 24th Moderator of the United Church of Canada.

== Early life and education ==
Arthur Moore was born in Keswick Ridge, New Brunswick on February 4, 1906, the fifth son of a Congregational minister. He spent his early years in the Eastern Townships of Quebec. In 1923, age 17, he enrolled in liberal arts at McGill University, but by his second year of studies, he felt drawn to ministry and began part-time studies at the United Theological College in Montreal.

== Ministry ==
Following graduation from McGill with his Bachelor of Arts, Moore filled student ministry posts in Tatamagouche, Nova Scotia, and Portneuf, Quebec while studying for a post-graduate degree in divinity. He earned a Bachelor of Divinity in 1930, and after completing his graduate studies at Oxford University, was ordained as a minister of the United Church of Canada. After a year of travel in Europe, he became the minister of Amherst Park United Church in Montreal. One day he met Margaret Price on a streetcar and they were married in 1933.

For the next ten years, the Moores moved to various churches in Quebec, Pennsylvania, Ontario and Saskatchewan.

== Academia and moderator ==
In 1946, Moore accepted the post of Principal and Professor of Theology at St. Andrew's College, a theological school attached to the University of Saskatchewan in Saskatoon. In 1950, he became the president and vice-chancellor of Victoria University in Toronto, a post he would fill for twenty years. During his tenure, he facilitated the construction of campus resources, and was also involved in the formation of the Toronto School of Theology.

During this period, Moore delivered the eulogies of several prominent Canadians, including poet E.J. Pratt (1964), fellow minister and first Moderator of the United Church George C. Pidgeon (1971), and former prime minister Lester B. Pearson (1972).

In 1971, Moore was elected to a two-year term as the 24th Moderator of the United Church of Canada, succeeding Robert McClure. Moore later recalled in his memoirs that "It was not a great council but it did some good and significant things [...] Much time was spent on restructuring the church. Every time the church grows discouraged over its condition, it seems to think that a new organization equates with revitalization. This is far from true; the renewal comes from within its members."

For several years before his election, Moore had been co-chair of a joint commission of the United Church and the Anglican Church of Canada that explored the possibility of an organic union of the two denominations. At the 1971 General Council that elected Moore as Moderator, the delegates were presented with Plan of Union, the commission's proposal on how this could be accomplished. The report was accepted by the delegates, and the Hymn Book, a new source of song and liturgy, was produced the same year for use by both denominations. This was as close as the two would get. In 1975, the Anglican House of Bishops and National Executive Council rejected the Plan of Union, unwilling to give up ordination of clergy by bishops, and refusing to recognize United Church clergy as ordained.

In 1977, Moore became chancellor of the University of Toronto, a post he held for three years.

== Retirement and death ==
After his retirement, he wrote his memoirs, titled Here where we live, published by United Church Publishing House in 1988. Moore died in Toronto on September 9, 2004, age 98.

== Awards and recognition ==
- 1952: Honorary Doctor of Laws, University of Saskatchewan
- 1975: Honorary Doctor of Divinity, Victoria University.
- Honorary degrees from St. Andrew's College (1961), McGill University (1978), and University of Toronto (1981)
- In 1976, Moore was made an Officer of the Order of Canada "for his services to the religious and educational life of our country".

Religious titles
Preceded by Robert Baird McClure	Moderator of the United Church of Canada; 1971–1972	Succeeded by Bruce McLeod
Academic offices
Preceded by Eva Waddell Mader Macdonald	Chancellor of the University of Toronto; 1977–1980	Succeeded by George Ignatieff
