= Pauline Mills McGibbon =

Canadian lieutenant governor for the province of Ontario (1910-2001)

The Honourable Pauline Mills McGibbon CC OOnt

22nd Lieutenant Governor of Ontario
- In office 10 April 1974 – 15 September 1980
- Monarch: Elizabeth II
- Governors General: Jules Léger; Edward Schreyer
- Premier: Bill Davis
- Preceded by: William Ross Macdonald
- Succeeded by: John Black Aird

24th Chancellor of the University of Toronto
- In office 1971–1974
- President: Claude Bissell; John H. Sword (acting); John Robert Evans
- Preceded by: Omond Solandt
- Succeeded by: Eva Mader Macdonald

Personal details
- Born: 20 October 1910 Sarnia, Ontario, Canada
- Died: 14 December 2001 (aged 91) Toronto, Ontario, Canada
- Spouse: Donald Walker McGibbon (1910–1996) (m. 1935)
- Profession: Director, community organizer

Pauline Mills McGibbon CC OOnt (21 October 1910 – 14 December 2001) served as the 22nd Lieutenant Governor of Ontario from 1974 to 1980. In addition to being the first woman to occupy that position, she was also the first woman to serve as a viceregal representative in Canadian history.

Once described as 'Ontario’s Eve' for all her 'first woman' achievements, the Honourable Pauline McGibbon dedicated her life to the betterment of her community, province and nation. A 1976 article indicated 'She has a warm, smiling face wreathed by a grey braid, her trademark... She is almost apologetic for being ‘old-fashioned,' but, because of her upbringing, she says she rarely feels really dressed, without gloves'. Former Governor-General Adrienne Clarkson once commented that McGibbon 'was perceptive, incisive, amusing and self-deprecating'.

== Early life ==
Pauline Emily Mills was born 20 October 1910 in Sarnia, Ontario. She was the only child of Alfred William and Ethel Selina Mills, her father being a textiles and goods merchant. After George Street, and Lochiel Street Schools, and Sarnia Collegiate, she studied at Victoria College at the University of Toronto, graduating in 1933 with a Bachelor of Arts in Modern History.

In January 1935 Pauline married football star and her childhood sweetheart Donald Walker McGibbon, both attending the university together. Don later became vice-president and treasurer of Imperial Oil Limited.

== Career ==
A lifelong volunteer and supporter of the arts, McGibbon became president of the Dominion Drama Festival from 1957 to 1959. She volunteered for years including national president of the Imperial Order Daughters of the Empire from 1963 to 1965. She was the first woman to lead such organizations as the Canadian Conference of the Arts (1972).

McGibbon served as chancellor, and first female in those roles, of the universities of Toronto (1971–1974) and Guelph (1977–1983).

Appointed by prime minister Pierre Trudeau, McGibbon was installed as the first female Lieutenant Governor of Ontario on 17 January 1974, and thus became the first female governor in the country. (The first female Lieutenant Governor in the Commonwealth was Dame Hilda Bynoe, Governor of Grenada 1968–1974.) She held the office until 1980. A particular focus of her mandate was the arts in Ontario. This was her first salaried employment, due to the support of her husband which had enabled her to devote much time to voluntary work. Of her annual $35 000 salary, she gave back the money other than for $200 a month which at her husband's request went into a retirement savings plan.

Additional to her benevolent work, McGibbon was an active member of the business community, and served as director on companies in Canada such as IBM Canada Limited, Imasco, Mercedes-Benz, and George Weston Limited.

From 1980 McGibbon was a director of Massey Hall and Roy Thomson Hall. She also served as chairman, and their first female chair of the National Arts Centre in Ottawa (1980), and honorary colonel of 25 (Toronto) Service Battalion and No. 7 Cadet Corps of Saint Thomas.

During her life, McGibbon was also the governor of the Upper Canada College. In 1984-85, McGibbon also served on the Board of Patrons of the now-defunct Grenville Christian College, the subject of “Born and Razed”, a memoir about the abuses perpetrated by the owners and staff. The College was closed in 2007 when publication of allegations of abuse led to declined enrollment. The College lost a class action lawsuit brought against it citing those abuses in 2020.

== Later life ==
She and Don had no children.

By the end of her life, McGibbon had been the chairman, a board member, director, and/or president of at least fifteen arts associations, including the National Arts Centre (Ottawa), the Toronto International Festival of Dance and Music, and the du Maurier Council for the Performing Arts.

After a lengthy illness, McGibbon died in Toronto on Friday, 14 December 2001, aged 91. She was buried in the family plot in the Lakeview Cemetery in Sarnia, Ontario.

== Legacy ==
Established in 1981, the Pauline McGibbon Award, a monetary $7000 (2021) award, is given each year to a member of Ontario’s professional theatre community in the early stages of the member's career who has displayed a unique talent and a potential for excellence. The Ontario Arts Council manages the award.

Her name is also given to Pauline McGibbon Park, 180 North College Avenue, Sarnia.

== Awards ==
McGibbon is the first woman to hold the presidency of the University of Toronto Alumni Association (1952–53). In November 1956, she received a life membership in Ontario provincial chapter, to which she had given continuous service since 1940. McGibbon was one of many people recognised by the Alumni as 1990 Arbor Award recipients for generosity and contribution to the experience of university members.

She received the medal of service of the Order of Canada in recognition of her contributions to worthy causes. She was made a Dame of the Order of Saint Lazarus. In 1957 McGibbon received the Canadian Drama Award for outstanding service to theatre in Canada.

She received the Civic Award of Merit from the City of Toronto, and in the same year an honorary doctor of laws degree from University of Alberta.

McGibbon was named as an Officer of the Order of Canada in December 1967, for her contribution to the theatre and education, and several volunteer organizations. After leaving Office, McGibbon was promoted to be a Companion of the Order of Canada in 1980, and was separately appointed to the Order of Ontario in December 1988.

In October 1975 as a lieutenant-governor, she was awarded an honorary law degree by the University of Toronto.

By March 1977, McGibbon held seven honorary degrees from Canadian universities, an Honorary Fellow of the Royal College of Physicians and Surgeons of Canada, a Dame of Grace of the Order of Saint John of Jerusalem, the Canadian Centennial Medal (1967), and the Award of Merit from the Canadian Public Relations Society. She had also been the first woman member of the Royal Canadian Military Institute.

Government offices
Preceded by William Ross Macdonald	Lieutenant Governor of Ontario; 1974–1980	Succeeded by John Black Aird
Academic offices
Preceded by Omond Solandt	Chancellor of the University of Toronto; 1971–1974	Succeeded by Eva Waddell Mader Macdonald
Preceded by Emmett Hall	Chancellor of the University of Guelph; 1977–1983	Succeeded by William Stewart
