= Eva Waddell Mader Macdonald =

Canadian academic (1902–1997)

Eva Mader Macdonald

25th Chancellor of the University of Toronto
- In office 1974–1977
- President: John Robert Evans
- Preceded by: Pauline Mills McGibbon
- Succeeded by: Arthur B. B. Moore

Personal details
- Born: Eva Waddell Mader Macdonald; October 7, 1902 Halifax, Nova Scotia
- Died: April 27, 1997 (aged 94)
- Education: Dalhousie University (MD); University of Toronto (DPH)
- Occupation: Medical professional

Eva Waddell Mader Macdonald (October 7, 1902 – April 27, 1997) was a Canadian medical professional at the Women's College Hospital. She began as a medical professor in hygiene before becoming the Director of Laboratories at WCH from 1945 to 1952. Outside of medicine, Macdonald was the chancellor of the University of Toronto from 1974 to 1977.

== Early life and education ==
In 1902, Macdonald was born in Halifax, Nova Scotia. In 1927, she graduated from Dalhousie University and went to the University of Toronto with a health scholarship. She received a Diploma in Public Health from the University of Toronto's Faculty of Medicine in 1929.

== Career ==
In 1927, Macdonald began her medical career as an intern at Nova Scotia Sanatorium. After a brief stint at Nova Scotia Sanatorium, Macdonald began working at the Women's College Hospital in 1929. At the Women's College Hospital, Macdonald was a medical professor in hygiene for the University of Toronto until 1933. During her career, she held multiple positions for the Women's College Hospital, including Hospital Bacteriologist (1939–1945), Director of Laboratories (1945 to 1952), and Director of Hospital Health (1953–1968). During her time at Women's College Hospital, Macdonald co-developed, with Marion Hilliard, a simplified Pap test in partnership with W. L. Robinson of the Banting Institute. Alternatively, Macdonald began working as a private practitioner in 1952 and continued until 1962.

In 1963, Macdonald created an initiative called Operation Recall to convince former women doctors to return to their careers. Outside of her health career, Macdonald replaced Pauline McGibbon as the chancellor of the University of Toronto in 1974. Macdonald held the position of chancellor until 1977 and retired in 1978.

== Awards and honours ==
In 1974, Macdonald was named alumna of the year of Dalhousie University Faculty of Medicine. In 1975, Macdonald was awarded an honorary Doctor of Humane Letters by Mount Saint Vincent University.

== Personal life ==
Macdonald was married with two children.

== Death ==
Macdonald died on 24 April 1997.
