= Sylvia Watson =

Canadian politician

Toronto City Councillor for (Ward 14) Parkdale–High Park
- In office December 1, 2003 – November 30, 2006
- Preceded by: Chris Korwin-Kuczynski
- Succeeded by: Gord Perks

Personal details
- Born: Austria
- Occupation: Lawyer

Sylvia Watson is a former Canadian politician. She was a Toronto City Councillor for Ward 14 Parkdale-High Park from 2003 to 2006 and the candidate for the Ontario Liberal Party in the 2006 by-election and in the 2007 general election.

== Background ==
Watson and her family immigrated to Canada when she was a child as displaced person from Austria following World War II. The family settled in Toronto.

She studied at York University and Osgoode Law School and was called to the bar in 1981. She became corporate counsel for Wellesley Hospital in 1986. In 1991 she was hired by the City of Toronto where she performed a number of roles including director of litigation and city solicitor.

== Municipal politics ==
In 2003, Watson ran for city council in (Ward 14), Parkdale–High Park to replace retiring councillor Chris Korwin-Kuczynski. Even though she didn't live in the ward, she was known for participating in an affordable housing initiative called the Parkdale Pilot Project. She beat her nearest rival, Ed Zielinski (who was endorsed by Korwin-Kuczynski) by 3,988 votes.

During her three years as councillor, she chaired the Administration Committee, and served as vice-chair of the Budget Advisory Committee.

== Provincial politics ==
=== By-election, 2006 ===
On June 27, 2006, Watson announced that she would run in a provincial by-election to replace Gerrard Kennedy who was moving on to federal politics. Watson based her campaign on the Liberal government's record of investing in education and health care but acknowledged that she was in a tight race considering that the provincial riding encompassed only half her former city riding.

The campaign became contentious when Watson's campaign issued a press release claiming that NDP rival, United Church minister Cheri DiNovo had compared the media treatment of Karla Homolka as "comparable to the persecution of Jesus Christ." The accusation was based on a statement taken out of context in a sermon in which DiNovo had suggested Homolka was being used as a scapegoat villain. The seemingly desperate attempt to smear an opponent backfired and severely damaged Wilson's campaign.

DiNovo won the election by 2,288 votes.

=== Provincial general election, 2007 ===
On May 11, 2007, the Liberals nominated Watson to stand again as their candidate in Parkdale—High Park for the 2007 Ontario election. She was again defeated by DiNovo, this time by an increased margin.

== After politics ==
As of 2011, Watson is employed as an adjudicator for the provincial Landlord and Tenant Board.

== Electoral record ==
2007 Ontario general election
Party	Candidate	Votes	%	±%
New Democratic	Cheri DiNovo	18,136	44.6	+3.6
Liberal	Sylvia Watson	11,900	29.3	-3.7
Progressive Conservative	David Hutcheon	6,013	14.8	-2.5
Green	Bruce Hearns	3,937	9.7	+3.5
Libertarian	Zork Hun	327	0.8	+0.2
Family Coalition	Marilee Kidd	322	0.8	-0.5
Total valid votes		40,635	100.0	

Ontario provincial by-election, September 14, 2006
Party	Candidate	Votes	%	±%
New Democratic	Cheri DiNovo	11,675	41.0	+25.2
Liberal	Sylvia Watson	9,387	33.0	-24.8
Progressive Conservative	David Hutcheon	4,921	17.3	+1.1
Green	Frank De Jong	1,758	6.2	-0.7
Family Coalition	Stan Grzywna	366	1.3	-0.25
Libertarian	Jim McIntosh	162	0.6	
Freedom	Silvio Ursomarzo	111	0.4	0.0
Independent	John Turmel	77	0.3	
Total valid votes		28,457	100.0	

2003 Toronto Election, Ward 14,

Candidate	Votes	%
Sylvia Watson	7,441	52.51%
Ed Zielinski	3,453	24.37%
Walter Jarsky	847	5.97%
Neil Webster	782	5.51%
Steven Aspiotis	705	4.97%
David Smaller	635	4.48%
Mark Chmielewski	210	1.48%
Ed Veri	95	0.67%
