= Fair Employment Week =

Fair Employment Week is an annual campaign that promotes employment fairness for sessional lecturers and other contract faculty working in Canadian universities and colleges. It is held in the last week of October, at the same time as Campus Equity Week in the United States and Mexico. It grew out of an American initiative, Action 2000 (A2K), which was held in early 2000 when faculty from California's 107 community colleges organized a week of political action. The impetus for A2K was a common interest in California state legislation and the state budget, but many campus groups used the opportunity to address collective bargaining and local campus issues as well. In 2001, the participants at the Conference on Contingent Academic Labour (COCAL) IV, meeting in San Jose, California, voted to coordinate a week of activities across North America, under the name Campus Equity Week.

Fair Employment Week is currently supported by a large number of faculty associations and professional organizations, including the FPSE and the Canadian Association of University Teachers and the Federation of Post-Secondary Educators of BC. Typical Fair Employment Week activities include information drives targeting students and the media, letters and petitions aimed at university administrations, and social gatherings of sessional and other contract faculty.
