= John Robert Evans =

Canadian cardiologist, academic, and businessperson (1929–2015)

John Robert Evans CC OOnt

9th President of the University of Toronto
- In office 1972–1978
- Chancellor: Pauline Mills McGibbon; Eva Mader Macdonald; Arthur B. B. Moore
- Preceded by: John H. Sword (acting)
- Succeeded by: James Milton Ham

1st Dean of McMaster University Medical School
- In office 1965–1972

Personal details
- Born: 1 October 1929 Toronto, Ontario, Canada
- Died: 13 February 2015 (aged 85) Toronto, Ontario, Canada
- Spouse: Gay Glassco
- Education: University of Toronto; University of Oxford

John Robert Evans CC OOnt (1 October 1929 – 13 February 2015) was a Canadian cardiologist, academic, businessperson, and civic leader.

He was the founding dean of the McMaster University Medical School and then vice-president of Health Services at McMaster University from 1965 to 1972. From 1972 to 1978 he was President of the University of Toronto. From 1979 to 1983, he served as founding Director of the Population, Health and Nutrition Department of the World Bank in Washington, DC.

Evans was a key player in the sale of the Canadian Connaught Laboratories to the French Sanofi-Aventis.

He was elected as the ninth Chairman of the Rockefeller Foundation, a position that he held from 1987 to 1995. Evans was the first Canadian to hold the position.

He was chairman of Allelix Biopharmaceuticals Inc., Torstar Corporation, Alcan Aluminum Ltd. (1995–2002), the Canada Foundation for Innovation and the Walter and Duncan Gordon Charitable Foundation. He was the chairman of and helped create the MaRS Discovery District in Toronto. He died at the age of 85 from Parkinson's disease in 2015.

== Early life and education ==
Evans was born in Toronto, and was the youngest of seven children. His parents were Mary and William Watson Evans. Evans was orphaned at the age of nine and was subsequently raised by his older siblings. He went to the University of Toronto Schools for high school, and after graduating from UTS, studied medicine at the University of Toronto (U of T). He was a varsity football player at U of T and would later become a member of U of T's Sports Hall of Fame. He received his medical degree from the University of Toronto in 1952 and was a Rhodes Scholar at University College, Oxford. He received his Doctoral degree specializing in internal medicine and cardiology at Oxford University in 1955.

== Academic career ==
Evans was a research fellow at Harvard Medical School from 1960 to 1961, he then returned to Toronto as an associate professor at U of T's Faculty of Medicine. He also worked as a cardiologist at Toronto General Hospital during this period, apparently the only time that he practised medicine.

At the relatively young age of 35, Evans was selected as the founding Dean of McMaster University's new Medical School.

== Politics ==
In a 1978 federal by-election, Evans ran for a seat in the House of Commons as a Liberal in the Toronto riding of Rosedale, but was defeated by former Toronto Mayor David Crombie.

== Honours and awards ==
- 2007 – He was awarded the Henry G. Friesen International Prize in Health Research
- 2005 – He was inducted into the Canadian Business Hall of Fame
- 2000 – He was inducted into the Canadian Medical Hall of Fame
- 1992 – He was awarded the Gairdner Foundation Wightman Award
- 1991 – He was made an Honorary Fellow of University College, Oxford
- 1991 – He was made a member of the Order of Ontario
- 1978 – He was made a Companion of the Order of Canada

=== Honorary degrees ===
Evans received 15 Honorary Doctorates, including:

- (Nova Scotia) 1972: Dalhousie University, Doctor of Laws (LLD)
- (Ontario) 1972: McMaster University, Doctor of Laws (LLD)
- (Ontario) 1972: York University, Doctor of Laws (LLD)
- (Dominion of Newfoundland) 1973: Memorial University of Newfoundland, Doctor of Science, (DSc)
- (Ontario) 1974: Queen's University, Doctor of Laws (LLD)
- (Ontario) 1975: Wilfrid Laurier University, Doctor of Laws (LLD)
- (Connecticut) 1978: Yale University, Doctor of Laws (LLD)
- (Maryland) 1978: Johns Hopkins University, Doctor of Humane Letters (LHD)
- (Ontario) 1980: University of Toronto, Doctor of Laws (LLD), honoured for "Service to the University"
- (Netherlands) 1981: Maastricht University, honored for "Education innovation"
- (Alberta) 1996: University of Calgary, Doctor of Laws (LLD)
- 2005: University of Alberta, Doctor of Science, (DSc)
- (Ontario) 2009: Lakehead University, Doctor of Science, (DSc)

Academic offices
Preceded by None	Dean and vice-president of the McMaster University Medical School, McMaster University; 1965-1972	Succeeded by Fraser Mustard
Non-profit organization positions
Preceded by Clifton R. Wharton Jr.	Chairman of the Rockefeller Foundation; 1987 — 1995	Succeeded by Alice Stone Ilchman
