= Chris Korwin-Kuczynski =

Canadian politician

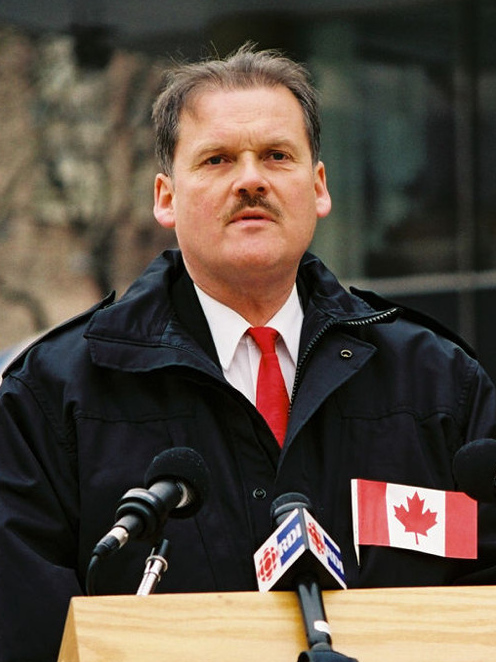
- Korwin-Kuczynski in 2002

Toronto City Councillor for (Ward 14) Parkdale–High Park
- In office December 1, 2000 – November 30, 2003
- Preceded by: New riding
- Succeeded by: Sylvia Watson

City Councillor for Ward 19 - High Park with David Miller
- In office January 1, 1998 – November 30, 2000
- Preceded by: New riding
- Succeeded by: Riding abolished

Toronto Councillor for Ward 2 - Parkdale
- In office 1985 – December 31, 1997
- Preceded by: New riding
- Succeeded by: Riding abolished

Junior Alderman for Ward 2 - Parkdale with Ben Grys
- In office 1982–1985
- Preceded by: Tony Ruprecht, Ben Grys
- Succeeded by: Riding renamed

Personal details
- Born: 1953 (age 72–73) Toronto, Ontario
- Occupation: Consultant

Chris Korwin-Kuczynski (born 1953) is a former Canadian municipal politician. He served as a councillor in Toronto from 1981 to 2003, and was the city's deputy mayor for a time.

He was born in Toronto, and holds a Bachelor of Arts degree in political science from York University. He has been a director of the Polish-Canadian Congress, and has served as a special assistant to the federal Minister of State for Multiculturalism. He ran unsuccessfully for city council in 1980 as Chris Korwin but was successful on his second attempt, in a 1981 by-election.

In 1992, Korwin-Kuczynski successfully urged that the music group Barenaked Ladies be banned from performing a concert in Nathan Phillips Square because he believed their name objectified women. This decision was widely ridiculed, and gave considerable publicity to the then-obscure band.

Korwin-Kuczynski was a member of the council's right-wing, and was a frequent ally of fellow councillor Tom Jakobek. Kyle Rae has suggested that Korwin-Kuczynski became isolated on council when Jakobek left in 2000.

In 1993, Korwin-Kuczynski was removed as chair of the Toronto Board of Health after criticizing a strongly worded AIDS prevention pamphlet published by the AIDS Committee of Toronto. He had suggested that the committee, which received significant support from Toronto's gay community, be denied city funding if it continued publishing such materials. Referring to his dismissal after the vote, he commented, "[t]he only real issue I think this all stems from is AIDS, the whole issue surrounding the gay issue".

Kyle Rae, who is openly gay, has said that Korwin-Kuczynski was anti-gay during the early 1990s but later changed his views. In 2003, Rae was quoted as saying, "He's now generally supportive of these issues, but that didn't come easily."

He opposed a 1996 municipal bill that banned smoking in restaurants and bars, and requested that provincial Premier Mike Harris veto the measure.

Korwin-Kuczynski considered running for the Liberal nomination in Parkdale—High Park in the 1997 federal election, but ultimately declined. He retired from the council in 2003, amid rumours that he would move into consulting work.

He endorsed Dennis Mills's bid for re-election in the 2004 federal election, and a newspaper report from the period suggest that he was considering running as a Liberal candidate in the next federal election.

On September 27, 2006, he filed papers to run in the 2006 Toronto municipal election in Ward 14. However the next day he withdrew his nomination. This allowed him to retain a fundraising surplus of $21,742 left over from his last campaign. If he hadn't done this the money would have flowed into the city coffers.

Korwin-Kuczynski is a former honorary captain of the Canadian Navy, and once served as a director on the board of the Royal Canadian Military Institute in Toronto.
