= Bloor Street United Church =

Coordinates: 43.667348°N 79.401965°W

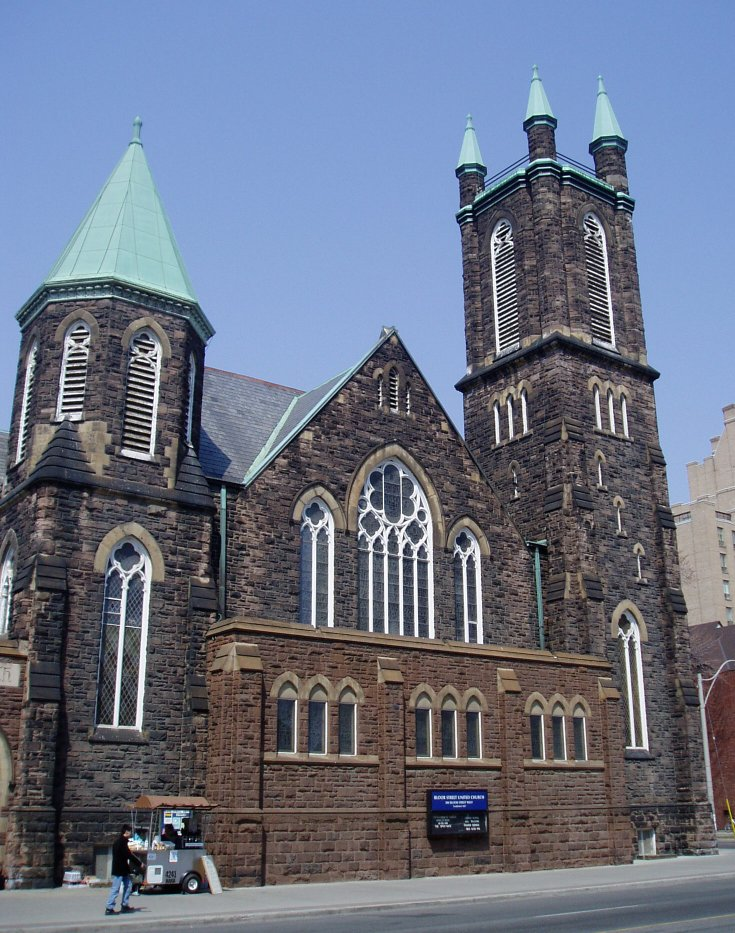
- Bloor Street United Church
- Location: 300 Bloor Street West; Toronto, Ontario
- Country: Canada
- Denomination: United Church of Canada
- Previous denomination: Presbyterian Church in Canada
- Website: bloorstreetunited.org

History
- Former name: Bloor Street Presbyterian Church (1886–1925)
- Founded: 1886

Architecture
- Architect: William R. Gregg
- Style: Gothic Revival
- Years built: 1889–1890

Ontario Heritage Act
- Designated: 2019

Bloor Street United Church is a historic United Church of Canada congregation in the Annex neighbourhood of Toronto, Ontario. Its church is located at the corner of Bloor Street West and Huron Street, just north of the University of Toronto's St. George campus.

Founded in 1886 as Bloor Street Presbyterian Church, the congregation joined the newly formed United Church of Canada in 1925. Its Gothic Revival building was designed by William R. Gregg and completed in 1890.

The church's historic exterior is being incorporated into Cielo Condos, a 34-storey mixed-use development that includes a reconstructed sanctuary and offices for the United Church of Canada.

== History ==
Bloor Street Presbyterian Church, 1910

The church began in 1886 as a Presbyterian Sunday school serving the rapidly growing population of what was then Toronto's north end. A temporary church, later used as a Sunday school and church hall, was designed by architect George William Eden Field. Ground was broken for a permanent building in 1889, and the Gothic Revival church, designed by William R. Gregg, was completed in 1890. Gregg's partner, Alexander Frank Wickson, designed a new Sunday school wing, completed in 1908.

In 1915, George C. Pidgeon became associate minister of Bloor Street Presbyterian Church and succeeded as its senior minister in 1918, serving until his retirement in 1948. Pidgeon was a leading figure in the movement that resulted in the formation of the United Church of Canada in 1925 and served as the new denomination's first moderator. The Bloor Street congregation voted overwhelmingly in favour of church union and became Bloor Street United Church. Following his retirement, Pidgeon was named minister emeritus, a position he held until his death.

In total, three ministers of Bloor Street United Church have served as Moderator of the United Church of Canada: George C. Pidgeon, Ernest M. Howse, and Bruce McLeod. Robert Baird McClure, a member of the congregation, became the first layperson to serve as moderator, holding the office from 1968 to 1971.

The building's Bloor Street elevation was altered in 1927 as a result of the City of Toronto's widening of Bloor Street. The church steps were removed and a new narthex was constructed on the west side of the building.

The congregation grew considerably during the 1940s and 1950s, as immigration brought new residents to the surrounding neighbourhood. Attendance became sufficiently large that Massey Hall was rented on several occasions to accommodate services.

In 1954, the church underwent extensive renovations costing nearly $100,000. On 31 August 1954, a fire damaged much of the church's interior, which was subsequently reconstructed by the architectural firm Bruce, Brown and Brisley, with the assistance of Professor I. S. Nairn of the University of Toronto. The reconstruction included a new structural system of arches and an enlarged choir area. In 1956, a stone lintel bearing the name "Bloor Street United Church" was installed above the original church doors. Several stained-glass windows were added between 1954 and 1962, including a large south window commemorating the congregation's 75th anniversary and depicting the theme of ecumenism.

== Architecture ==
The sanctuary prior to redevelopment, May 2012

The church complex occupies the northwest corner of Bloor Street West and Huron Street in the Annex neighbourhood of Toronto. Constructed in stages between 1886 and 1927, it is an example of late 19th-century Gothic Revival ecclesiastical architecture. The original church and Sunday school, designed by George W. E. Field and completed in 1888, occupies the northeast portion of the complex. The larger church, designed by William R. Gregg and completed in 1890, was constructed immediately to the south. A westward extension of the Sunday school, designed by the architectural firm Wickson & Gregg, was completed in 1909 and included a church hall.

The church is constructed of rusticated red Credit Valley sandstone with contrasting buff-coloured Ohio sandstone trim and polished granite columns. Its Gothic Revival features include pointed-arch windows, buttresses, spires and two asymmetrical towers. The larger corner tower is a prominent landmark at the intersection of Bloor and Huron streets. The interior originally followed a Presbyterian church plan, with a broad worship space, U-shaped gallery and an organ and pulpit positioned against the wall adjoining the Sunday school.

The widening of Bloor Street in 1927 necessitated alterations to the church's south elevation, undertaken by Wickson & Gregg. The original entrance staircase was removed, and the three entrance arches were relocated to a new single-storey entrance pavilion to the west. The narthex was extended slightly southward, and nine small arched windows replaced the original entrance arches. A single-storey addition containing a kitchen and nursery was subsequently constructed north of the Sunday school extension.

The property was designated under Part IV of the Ontario Heritage Act in 2019. The designation recognizes the complex's architectural significance as a representative example of Gothic Revival church architecture, its association with the establishment of the United Church of Canada, and its historical and contextual relationship with the development of the Annex neighbourhood.

== Redevelopment ==
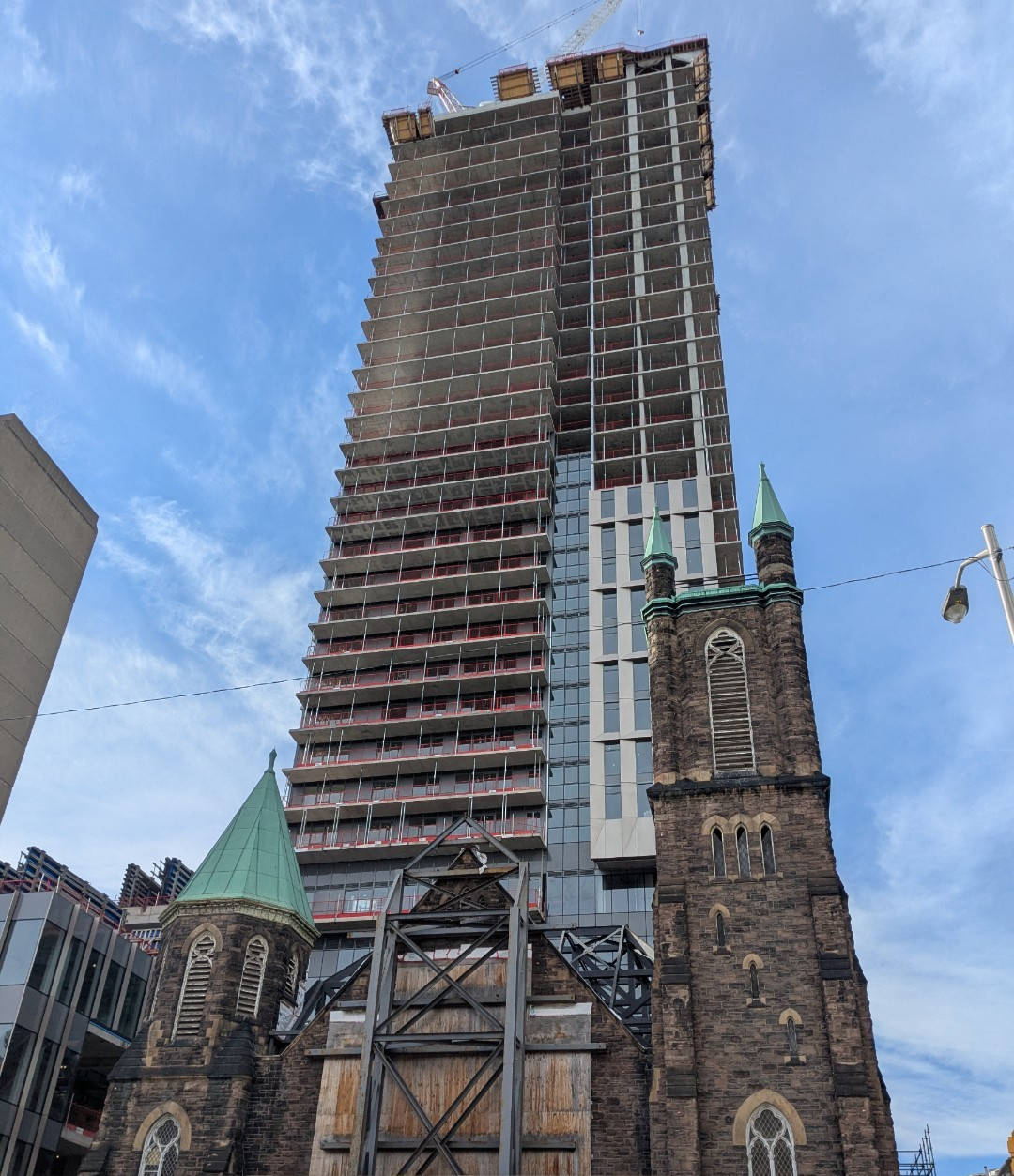
May 2026

In 2018, plans were announced for the redevelopment of the Bloor Street United Church property at 300 Bloor Street West. The proposal, a partnership between the congregation and developer Collecdev, initially called for a 38-storey mixed-use condominium tower designed by KPMB Architects, incorporating the historic church and the adjacent George C. Pidgeon House. The project included the restoration of the church's historic exterior, a reconstructed sanctuary, and new office and community spaces. Heritage conservation work was overseen by ERA Architects.

Preparatory work and partial demolition began in 2022. Much of the church's interior, roof and later additions were removed, while portions of its historic exterior walls were retained and temporarily supported by steel framing. The church's stained-glass windows and architectural elements were removed for conservation and eventual reinstatement. The west wall of the sanctuary was dismantled for reconstruction as part of a new atrium connecting the historic church with the condominium development. The adjacent George C. Pidgeon House was also incorporated into the redevelopment, with later additions removed to restore its original footprint.

The development, known as Cielo Condos, also includes new facilities for the congregation and office space intended to house the national headquarters of the United Church of Canada. In November 2025, the denomination vacated its longtime headquarters at 3250 Bloor Street West and relocated temporarily to 50 Wynford Drive pending completion of the redevelopment.

In May 2026, construction of the condominium tower reached its full height of 34 storeys, following a 2024 approval increasing its height from 29 storeys. The development is planned to contain 349 residential units, with the reconstructed church sanctuary and associated community facilities occupying part of the podium. The sanctuary is designed to accommodate both Christian worship and a Jewish congregation.

== See also ==
- List of United Church of Canada churches in Toronto
