= Ernest M. Howse =

Canadian priest (1902–1993)

The Very Reverend Ernest M. Howse

21st Moderator of the United Church of Canada
- In office 1964–1966
- Preceded by: James R. Mutchmor
- Succeeded by: Wilfred C. Lockhart

Personal details
- Born: February 1, 1902 Twillingate, Newfoundland
- Died: February 1, 1993 (aged 90) Toronto, Ontario, Canada
- Spouse: Esther Howse
- Profession: Minister

Ernest Marshall Frazer Howse (September 29, 1902 – February 1, 1993) was the 21st Moderator of the United Church of Canada from 1964 to 1966. Howse was born in Newfoundland in 1902 and studied in both Canada and Scotland. The subject of his doctoral thesis, presented to the University of Edinburgh in 1934, was the Clapham Sect. The thesis, later published by the University of Toronto Press in 1952, dealt in part with the Sect's efforts, in conjunction with William Wilberforce, to abolish the British slave trade. After pastoring Beverly Hills Presbyterian Church in California, he returned to Canada in 1935 to become the minister at Westminster United Church. Located in central Winnipeg, Westminster served some of the poorest areas of Canada during the Great Depression. Howse became a prominent advocate of the social gospel movement. He also believed in a very liberal view of Christianity. For example, he did not believe in the physical resurrection of Jesus. In 1948, he moved to Toronto to become the minister at Bloor Street United Church, a position he held until his retirement in 1970. After his retirement, he became a regular writer on faith matters for the Toronto Star until 1979. Howse was also active in the World Council of Churches. In 1954, he was one of 25 Christian leaders from around the world who met in Lebanon with 25 Muslim leaders to improve interfaith dialogue. He was later elected co-president of the WCC's committee on Muslim-Christian Co-operation. He was married to Ester Howse and had three children: Margery, David, and George. Grandfather to: Scott, Kate (Margery), Andrew, and Jennifer (David), Rachel, Julie, and Deborah (George).

Religious titles
Preceded by James R. Mutchmor	Moderator of the United Church of Canada; 1964–1966	Succeeded by Wilfred C. Lockhart
