= BC Studies =

BC Studies: The British Columbian Quarterly
- Discipline: British Columbia history
- Language: English

Publication details
- History: 1969 to present
- Publisher: University of British Columbia (Canada)
- Frequency: Quarterly

Standard abbreviations
- ISO 4: BC Stud.

Indexing
- ISSN: 0005-2949

Links
- Journal homepage

BC Studies: The British Columbian Quarterly is a Canadian academic journal about British Columbia history. It has been published by the University of British Columbia (UBC) since its establishment in 1969 by its founding editors Margaret Prang and Walter D. Young. The editors for BC Studies includes three UBC historians, two UBC geographers, a UBC historian from their Faculty of Education, a political scientist from the University of Victoria, and finally a historian from British Columbia that have experience in the archaeology and historical geography fields. It is peer-reviewed and published quarterly. It is indexed by EBSCOhost, Gale Group, H. W. Wilson, International Atomic Energy Agency, National Library of Medicine, OCLC, and ProQuest.

BC Studies have an annual prize that is awarded to the author with the best paper published in a journal each year. This award began in 2015, and is funded by donations. The papers are judged by editors, and BC Studies Editorial Board that have made the greatest contribution to the scholarship of British Columbia.

In the Winter of 2016/17 there has been 192 issues published. In a journal issue there is usually five parts: Articles, Photo Essay, Book Reviews, Bibliography of BC and Contributors.
