= Bruce McLeod (clergyman) =

25th Moderator of the United Church of Canada

The Very Reverend Bruce McLeod
- 25th Moderator of the United Church of Canada
- McLeod aged 43
- Church: United Church of Canada
- In office: 1972–1974
- Predecessor: Arthur B. B. Moore
- Successor: Wilbur K. Howard

Personal details
- Born: Norman Bruce McLeod; February 5, 1929 Toronto, Ontario, Canada
- Died: January 13, 2026 (aged 96) Orangeville, Ontario, Canada
- Education: BA, BDiv, MA, ThD
- Alma mater: University of Toronto; Emmanuel College, Toronto; Columbia University; Union Theological Seminary

Norman Bruce McLeod (5 February 1929 – 13 January 2026) was a Canadian minister of the United Church of Canada who served as the church's 25th Moderator. At the time of his election, he was the youngest person to serve as moderator, and was the first moderator to have been baptized as an infant in the United Church.

== Early life and education ==
Bruce McLeod was born in Toronto, the son of Norm McLeod, chairman of the international conglomerate Moore Corporation, and Maude, a former social worker. As a member of Toronto's upper middle class, he went to high school at prestigious Upper Canada College before earning a Bachelor of Arts from University of Toronto.

Both of McLeod's parents had been raised as members of the Presbyterian Church of Canada, and attended Deer Park Presbyterian Church in Toronto. Following the amalgamation of the Presbyterian, Methodist and Congregational churches in 1925, Deer Park became part of the new United Church of Canada, and was where young Bruce was baptized, attended Sunday School, and became a confirmed member of the United Church. Norm and Maude actively worked for the new church — Norm would chair the national Division of Finance for 20 years. Norm's brother — Bruce's uncle — was Rev. Hugh Alexander McLeod, who would be elected as United Church Moderator in 1960.

So it was no surprise to Norm and Maude when, after earning his degree, their son enrolled in divinity studies at Emmanuel College, where he earned a Bachelor of Divinity. He then moved to Columbia University, earning his Master of Arts, before taking advanced theological studies at Union Theological Seminary, receiving his Doctor of Theology.

== Ministry ==
McLeod was ordained as a minister of the United Church of Canada in 1953, and was settled in rural Nova Scotia at the church in Victoria Harbour. From there he served congregations at St. Stephen's on-the-Hill United in Lorne Park, Ontario and Westdale United Hamilton, Ontario.

McLeod started to travel internationally during what he termed "working sabbaticals", and in 1966, travelled to Japan and Taiwan for three weeks representing the United Church Observer. He decided to go to Vietnam while he was in that part of the world, entering a war-torn country during a conflict that was only starting to appear on the North American newscasts. It was the first time that McLeod had heard gunfire. As he later wrote, "I also saw children falling asleep in the streets at night." Biographer Noelle Boughton called this a turning point for McLeod, when social justice became the focus of his ministry.

Shortly after his return to Canada, Israel and the surrounding Arab states fought the Six Day War. During the first days of the war, when Israel's existence hung in the balance, while the national United Church leadership remained silent, McLeod quickly organized and published a statement signed by more than 400 people from eight Christian denominations that expressed concern for the survival of Israel. When that statement was transmitted across Canada, McLeod achieved national prominence. His high profile was further enhanced when he moved to Bloor Street United Church in Toronto, and called for governments to end the tax-free status of churches in Canada unless each church did something to benefit the wider community, such as create a drop-in centre.

McLeod also took an interest in the power of television to reach into the living room, saying, "The church has to learn how to use television much better than it has, rather than expecting people to come out to its old buildings for religious purposes."One such use that McLeod tried was to televise a Christmas service from a local shopping mall.

== Moderator ==
McLeod was nominated for the post of Moderator in 1968, but was runner-up to Bob McClure. He was nominated again in 1972. At the 25th General Council of the church, McLeod stated that the church's top priority was "to be responsive to new needs." He also called for an end to rigid structures. Canadian Press reported that he "was regarded by many members of the council as the most progressive of the candidates" and that "he was described ... as an expert in communications, an increasingly vital role for the church." McLeod was subsequently elected to the post of moderator on the fourth ballot. At age 43, he was the youngest person to become moderator to that point in time, and was the first moderator to have been born and baptized in the United Church.

At the start of his term, on an episode of the CBC television program Man Alive, McLeod told TV host Roy Bonisteel "I'd be personally pleased if, at the end of my two years, the relations between the Jewish community and the United Church were much warmer and franker than they are now."Thirty years later, Haim Genizi wrote that McLeod had succeeded in this regard.

McLeod travelled widely during his term, speaking with church members across the country and urging churches to look to the future rather than the past. McLeod also urged closer inter-church ties and more international cooperation between faiths and denominations. However, he was disappointed that, after years of talks with the Anglican Church of Canada that seemed to be moving towards amalgamation and that had produced a common hymn book, the Anglican bishops' synod abruptly pulled out of further union talks. Likewise, he was disappointed when union talks with the Disciples of Christ ended with no agreement.

During McLeod's term, he opened the new premises of the United Church of Canada archives at Victoria University.

== Post-moderator ==
After handing over the role of moderator to Wilbur K. Howard at the 26th General Council, McLeod also stepped down as minister of Bloor Street United, and became a commissioner for the Ontario Human Rights Commission. He also went on a year-long mission to Pueblito, Costa Rica, where he helped to set up a cooperative and residential village for abandoned children, travelling back to Toronto for occasional Commission meetings.

Returning to Canada after a year, he worked full time for the Commission, and chaired public hearings across the province of Ontario in advance of proposed changes to the province's human rights code. McLeod then authored the report, Life Together: A Report on Human Rights in Ontario, which was presented to the Ontario government in 1977.

In 1978, McLeod stepped down from the Commission, and was asked to become a candidate in the upcoming federal election, widely expected the following year. McLeod agreed to stand for the Liberal party in the newly created riding of The Beaches, but after campaigning for a number of months, he had to drop out of the race due to lack of any income. McLeod instead became minister of Richmond Hill United north of Toronto.

While a minister, he also became a political candidate again, running in the provincial riding of St. George as a Liberal candidate in the 1981 provincial election. But dividing his time between ministry and knocking on doors proved difficult, and he came in second to Susan Fish. McLeod later said of his time as a candidate, "I learned more about this city in those five weeks than I ever had as a minister or a person growing up in Toronto. I was in rooms and places I never went to as a minister ... I was meeting a world beyond the church."

In 1984, McLeod became minister of Metropolitan United Church, the largest church in the denomination. His interest in the power of television was unabated, and with Mardi Tindal, he became co-host of Spirit Connection, a weekly television show produced by the United Church in its new television studio and broadcast on Vision TV. He also started writing a weekly column for the op-ed pages of the Toronto Star, and contributed frequently to the United Church Observer. He was a good preacher, and columnist Gary Lautens wrote, "There are others, too, who have the wonderful ability to speak with easy grace from the pulpit. To me, Bruce McLeod stands with the very best ... it's a two-mile walk from our house to Metropolitan Church and I gladly volunteer to make the trek whenever Bruce McLeod is preaching." A collection of some of his homilies titled City Sermons: Preaching from a Downtown Church was published in 1986.

Social justice remained a core principle for McLeod. He travelled widely in Africa, Latin America and Asia as an official international observer. In 1987, he anonymously spent a night at Seaton House, a men's shelter, then wrote about his experiences and the poor conditions in the shelter for the Toronto Star.

McLeod stepped down from Metropolitan United in 1987, and went on to minister at churches in Stratford, Scarborough, and Rosedale.

In 1991, McLeod was elected president of the Canadian Council of Churches, and at the start of his three-year terms, called on churches of all denominations to work together, avoid duplicating enterprises that could be shared, and "to think and act together."

== Personal life ==
Bruce McLeod was married twice, first to Jewel with whom he had three daughters, and then to Rev. Joyce Kelly who brought her three children to the marriage. Roy Bonisteel said that McLeod played "a mean honky-tonk piano." He also enjoyed collecting modern art, watching Broadway plays, practising yoga, and recording books for the CNIB. As Marion Pardy, another former moderator, noted, "His lament, as his life became more physically limited, was that he could no longer be on the front lines protesting the injustices in our country. He could support others who did, however, and he did."

Bruce McLeod died in Orangeville, Ontario just short of his 97th birthday.

== Legacy ==
"McLeod championed women’s rights, including the right to bodily autonomy, and was outspoken against racism and an early ally of the 2SLGBTQ+ community. He marched for civil rights and wrote countless op-eds about the injustices he stood against." — Erin Pepler, Broadview

"His informality, his enthusiasm and warmth make him accessible to young people and old alike ... He has a trust in the man on the street, and wants the church to be more responsive to the new needs of the modern world, and to make all people one family." — Roy Bonisteel, Man Alive

"Bruce was a biblical, theological, spiritual prophet, pastor, preacher and poet, rooted in the conviction that it was the world God created in goodness and love." — Marion Pardy

"Our purpose as church and Christians is to love the world that God loves." — Bruce McLeod

== Electoral record ==
1981 Ontario general election: St. George
Party	Candidate	Votes	Vote %
Progressive Conservative	Susan Fish	12,406	43.2
Liberal	Bruce McLeod	8,125	28.3
New Democrat	Dan Leckie	4,882	17.0
Independent	George Hislop	2,658	9.3
Libertarian	Bruce Evoy	367	1.2
Independent	Rhino Mils	191	0.7
Independent	Gary Weagle	56	0.2
	Total	28,685	

Religious titles
Preceded by Arthur B. B. Moore	Moderator of the United Church of Canada; 1972–1974	Succeeded by Wilbur K. Howard
