= Kenneth McNaught =

Canadian historian (1918–1997)

Kenneth McNaught OC
- Born: Kenneth William McNaught; 10 November 1918; Toronto, Ontario, Canada
- Died: 2 June 1997 (aged 78); Toronto, Ontario, Canada
- Political party: Co-operative Commonwealth Federation
- Spouse: Beverley McNaught (m. c. 1942)

Academic background
- Education: University of Toronto
- Thesis: James Shaver Woodsworth (1950)
- Doctoral advisor: Frank Underhill

Academic work
- Discipline: History
- Institutions: United College; University of Toronto
- Doctoral students: Irving Abella; David Bercuson; Anne Golden; Graeme S. Mount; Wayne Roberts
- Influenced: Michael Bliss; Ramsay Cook

Kenneth William Kirkpatrick McNaught OC (1918–1997) was a Canadian historian. He is known for his 1959 biography of Co-operative Commonwealth Federation founder J. S. Woodsworth, A Prophet in Politics, and his 1982 book The Pelican History of Canada.

McNaught was born on 10 November 1918 to a family of middle-class leftists in Toronto, Ontario. He was the grandson of the Ontario MLA William Kirkpatrick McNaught. McNaught attended Upper Canada College before receiving a Bachelor of Arts in 1941 from the University of Toronto. During the Second World War, he served with the Royal Canadian Ordnance Corps. After the war, he returned to the University of Toronto, receiving a Master of Arts degree in 1946 and a Doctor of Philosophy degree in 1950. His doctoral supervisor was Frank Underhill.

From 1947 to 1959, he was a professor of history at United College (now the University of Winnipeg). He resigned in 1959 in protest of the college's dismissal of Harry Crowe. Later that year, he was appointed assistant professor of history at the University of Toronto. He was promoted to a full professorship in 1965 and served until 1989. From 1959 to 1969, he was a contributing editor at Saturday Night. In 1996, he was made an Officer of the Order of Canada "for his courage and integrity in defending academic freedom, and for his contributions in moving the country's political discourse beyond the classroom into the public domain". He died in Toronto on 2 June 1997.
