= Carol Goar =

Canadian journalist

Carol Goar is a Canadian journalist and was an editorial columnist for the Toronto Star until April 2016. She previously served as the newspaper's editorial page editor, Washington bureau chief and national affairs columnist. Prior to joining the Star, Goar also worked for Maclean's, the Ottawa Citizen and Canadian Press.

She won National Newspaper Awards in 1986 and 1997.
