= Harry S. Crowe =

Canadian historian (1922–1981)

- Born: Harry Sherman Crowe; 1922
- Died: 1981 (aged 58–59)

Academic background
- Education: University of Toronto; Columbia University

Academic work
- Discipline: History
- Sub-discipline: United College, Winnipeg; York University

Harry Sherman Crowe (1922–1981) was a history professor, university administrator, and labour researcher. In 1958, his firing by United College gained national attention in Canada. In raising questions about the security of academic freedom and tenure in Canada, Crowe's case became a catalyst in solidifying the work of the Canadian Association of University Teachers (CAUT) in defending academic freedom and ensuring scholarly rights for academic staff in Canada.

== Academic career ==
Crowe began his academic studies at United College (now the University of Winnipeg) in 1938. He enlisted in the army during the Second World War; attaining the rank of captain. Upon returning from military duty in Europe, Crowe studied at University of Manitoba (honours degree), and later pursued graduate studies at University of Toronto (MA) and Columbia University (PhD). In 1950, he was hired at United College. In 1951, he was awarded tenure and was later promoted to associate professor in 1956.

== Controversy ==
The events that led to his controversial dismissal began in 1958 when United College Principal Wilfred Lockhart obtained, by mysterious means, a letter written by Crowe to his colleague, William Packer. In that letter, Crowe had expressed concern with the religious and academic environment at United College and the worrying prospect of a Progressive Conservative victory in the upcoming March 1958 federal election. Lockhart raised the letter to the college's board of regents. Crowe was subsequently fired on the grounds that the letter demonstrated his incompatibility with the "avowed purposes" of the college and his lack of respect and loyalty to the administration. Crowe objected to his dismissal by arguing, among other things, that the letter was private in nature and its reading by Lockhart was unauthorized.

Crowe's termination prompted local and national concern about academic freedom and the status of tenure in higher education. Kenneth McNaught, Stewart Reid, and Richard Stingle announced they would resign in protest.

Crowe's dismissal, along with public concern about the affair, prompted the Canadian Association of University Teachers (CAUT) to step in by forming an ad hoc committee of inquiry—the first such committee established by CAUT, which was formed in 1951. In 1959, the final report of the CAUT investigation was delivered by University of Toronto law professor Bora Laskin and University of Saskatchewan economist Vernon Fowke. The Fowke–Laskin Report concluded that Crowe's dismissal was "an unjust and unwarranted invasion of the security of academic tenure." The report further determined that the board of regents mishandled the complaint against Crowe, violating natural justice, due process, and academic freedom.

The release of the Fowke–Laskin Report compelled the board of regents to reinstate Crowe. However, the board refused to reinstate his colleagues—McNaught, Reid, and Stingle—who had resigned in support of Harry Crowe. In protest, Crowe and twelve other faculty resigned from their positions at United College. Among them were: Michael Oliver, Fred Harper, Walter Young, Margaret Stobie, Roman R. March, G. E. Panting, Hugh R. Makepeace, Kay Sigurjonsson, William Packer, John Warkentin, Michael Jaremko, and Elizabeth F. Morrison.

== Legacy ==
One year after the Crowe events, CAUT adopted its first policy statement on academic freedom and established an Academic Freedom and Tenure Committee, which continues to monitor and investigate freedom matters for academic staff in Canada.

Following the incident at United College, Crowe worked for several years as a labour researcher for the Canadian Brotherhood of Railway, Transport, and General Workers. He returned to the academy for a teaching post at Atkinson College, York University, where he was a professor (1966–1969) and then college dean (1969–1974 and 1979–1981). Crowe also wrote as a columnist for both the Toronto Telegram and Chatelaine. He was co-author of A Source-Book of Canadian History: Selected Documents and Personal Papers.

In 2002, the Canadian Association of University Teachers established the Harry Crowe Foundation, a charitable organization that undertakes education and research on the role of post-secondary teaching and research in contemporary society.

== Bibliography ==
- "Report on the Crowe Case," Canadian Association of University Teachers, CAUT Bulletin, 7:3 (1959).
- Horn, Michiel. Academic Freedom in Canada: A History. Toronto: University of Toronto Press. 1998.
- McNaught, Kenneth. Conscience and History: A Memoir. Toronto: University of Toronto Press. 1999.
- Savage, Donald C. and Christopher Holmes, "The CAUT, the Crowe Case, and the Development of the Idea of Academic Freedom in Canada," CAUT Bulletin, 24, 3 (December, 1975), 22–27.
- Manitoba Historical Society
- University of Manitoba Archives
- York University Archives
