= Toronto City Mission =

Toronto City Mission (TCM) is a Christian nonprofit organization that runs outreach to people living in poverty in Toronto, Ontario, Canada. It was established in 1879 and is the oldest outreach organization in Toronto.

== History ==
Toronto City Mission was established on November 14, 1879, by a group of ministers and laymen to improve the spiritual and material welfare of poor people in the Toronto area. The focus was on preaching the Christian gospel and assisting needy parents, children, widows, the elderly, the sick, the hungry and the unemployed.

In 1894 the mission took over the work of the Fred Victor Mission. In the same year they purchased a home which was used as a summer camp for families and children from Toronto until 1977; the camp provided food, clothing, Christian evangelism, and a break from the city heat.

In 1898 a group of three women doctors founded a dispensary for poor women at the mission's Sackville Street location. This later grew to become Women's College Hospital.

== Current activities ==
In 1999 TCM changed its focus from being a provider of shelter, food, and clothing resources to a provider of self and community improvement opportunities. The mission organized a number of programs based on Christian values and beliefs; the programs are open to people from all religions, race, and sexual orientations.

About 180 children from grades one to six attend after-school programming and tutoring programs. Youth who are in Junior High and Senior High are offered after-school programming, tutoring, and mentorship. A youth leadership program called TLC (Teens Leading Community) allows youth to give back to their communities by being volunteers and leaders of the children's programs.

In conjunction with the Sprott Foundation, the mission provides the Role Model Moms Program in the Jane-Finch Community, with the goal of helping young mothers to pass the Ontario high school equivalency exam. There is also a men's basketball program in St. James Town.

TCM organizes community gatherings, including pot-luck dinners, family celebrations, Christmas celebrations with turkey dinners and gifts and the Adopt-a-Family program which matches families with sponsors and provides them with grocery and department store gift certificates at Christmas.

During the summer and March school breaks, the mission runs five-day "Sonshine" camps for children from low-income families in partnership with area churches including, Malvern Methodist, Bridletowne Park, St. Paul's Bloor St. Anglican, Wellspring Worship Centre, Willowdale Baptist Church, Spring Garden Baptist, and Emmanuel Church of the Nazarene Chinese Gospel Scarborough. A weeklong family camp is also offered for families impacted by poverty. These camps are sponsored by the Toronto Star Fresh Air Fund that sends thousands of kids to camp every year. About 170 campers attend the camps each week.

The organization's headquarters is now in Scarborough, a suburb of Toronto.
