= Canadian Association of University Teachers =

Federation of associations

- Association canadienne des professeures et professeurs d'université
- Abbreviation: CAUT
- Formation: 1951; 75 years ago
- Headquarters: Ottawa, Ontario, Canada
- Location: Canada
- Members: 75,000
- President: Robin Whitaker
- Executive director: David Robinson
- Affiliations: Education International
- Budget: $11.5 million (2025)
- Website: caut.ca

The Canadian Association of University Teachers (CAUT; French: Association canadienne des professeures et professeurs d'université, ACPPU) is a federation of independent associations and trade unions representing approximately 75,000 teachers, librarians, researchers, and other academic staff at over 130 colleges and universities across Canada.

== Core functions ==
The CAUT's core functions, as setout in its by-laws, are the following:

- the defence of academic freedom, tenure, equality and human rights;
- the provision of collective bargaining services for the support and assistance of member associations;
- the conduct of federal lobbying and public relations for academic staff and post-secondary education;
- the collection and analysis of data and the operation of a clearing house for information pertaining to the social and economic well-being of academic staff and post-secondary education;
- the establishment and maintenance of international relations with academic staff in other countries.

== History ==
In November 1949, the Association of Teaching Staff of the University of Alberta first began exploring the idea of creating a national association of faculty to deal with issues of "salaries and pensions, sabbatical leave and academic freedom." A poll of professors across the country found strong support for the initiative.

When the Learned Societies, now Canadian Federation for the Humanities and Social Sciences, held their annual session in 1950 at the Royal Military College of Canada in Kingston, Ontario, an organizing committee was established and a decision was made to establish a national organization of university teachers. CAUT was founded on 6 June the following year.

Membership grew quickly. By 1957, CAUT represented about 78 per cent of Canadian university teachers with 26 member associations and 3,400 full-time faculty. However, the organization struggled financially. It continued to operate without a national office and was staffed entirely by volunteers.

In 1958, CAUT was confronted with one of the most prominent academic freedom cases in Canada. The Board of Regents of Winnipeg's United College, a Presbyterian institution that is today the University of Winnipeg, dismissed Professor Harry S. Crowe for a letter he wrote to a colleague. The letter, obtained by the Principal of the college, was critical of the administration and made disparaging comments about the religious influence over the institution. CAUT was asked to investigate the matter and appointed a committee that included V. C. Fowke of the University of Saskatchewan and Bora Laskin of the University of Toronto. In its final report, the committee concluded that Crowe's dismissal violated due process, natural justice, and academic freedom. The committee recommended that Crowe be reinstated. Following the release of the report, three of Crowe's colleagues stated they planned to resign unless Crowe was re-hired. The Board of Regents eventually agreed to reinstate Crowe, but refused to reconsider the three resignations. In protest, Crowe and 13 other professors left the college.

Even though Crowe and his colleagues lost their jobs, the case proved to be a seminal moment in CAUT's history. The time, effort, and expenditure demanded by the case demonstrated the need for a permanent office which was established in Ottawa in the fall of 1959. Stewart Reid, a colleague of Crowe's, was appointed the first secretary of CAUT. Reid oversaw the development of policy statements on governance, academic freedom and tenure, and throughout the 1960s CAUT focused much of its work on ensuring stronger protections for academic freedom.

In this early period, CAUT member associations were not trade unions. The unionization of Canadian academics did not begin until the 1970s. Pay and benefits had increased during the boom period of the 1960s when government funding increased and new universities and colleges were established. By the early 1970s, however, the tide had turned. The academic community was now facing a protracted period of restraint. Many academics argued that collective organizing was now needed to protect their pay and professional rights.

Academic staff associations in Quebec were the first to certify as trade unions beginning in 1971 with the Association des Ingenieurs Professeurs en Science Appliques de l'Université de Sherbrooke. By 1975, more than 60 per cent of academic staff in Quebec were unionized. In English Canada, 25 per cent of professors were union members. CAUT increasingly encouraged member associations to certify, and by 1980 over 50 per cent of faculty were unionized. As of c. 2006, the unionization rate of academic staff was approximately 79 per cent, well above the average of 30 per cent for all occupations in Canada.

In recent years, CAUT's membership has grown as part-time and contract academic staff have been organized. In addition, provincial college faculty associations from British Columbia, Ontario, and Alberta have joined. As of 2025, CAUT represents approximately 75,000 individual members at over 130 colleges and universities.

== Academic freedom ==
While collective bargaining occupies a much more central place in CAUT's operations today, the defence of academic freedom remains a core priority. According to the CAUT policy statement, the association defines academic freedom as follows:

Academic freedom includes the right, without restriction by prescribed doctrine, to freedom of teaching and discussion; freedom in carrying out research and disseminating and publishing the results thereof; freedom in producing and performing creative works; freedom to engage in service to the institution and the community; freedom to express freely one’s opinion about the institution, its administration, or the system in which one works; freedom from institutional censorship; freedom to acquire, preserve, and provide access to documentary material in all formats; and freedom to participate in professional and representative academic bodies.

CAUT continues to investigate cases of alleged violations of academic freedom as in the Crowe case. Other notable investigations include the case of Nancy Olivieri, David Healy, and Tony Hall.

On 22 April 2021, CAUT censured the University of Toronto over its decision to terminate the candidacy of Valentina Azarova for the directorship of the international human rights program at the Faculty of Law.

=== Faith and ideological test investigations ===
The CAUT's position on academic freedom is that it is violated when universities require academic staff to commit to a particular ideology or statement of faith as a condition of employment. Where universities are alleged to impose a faith or ideological test as a condition of initial or continued employment, the CAUT appoints an ad-hoc committee to investigate. If the allegations are proven true and the university is unwilling to change its practices, then the university is added to a list of universities that impose a faith or ideological test. As of 2025, there are five universities on that list:

- Canadian Mennonite University
- Crandall University
- Providence University College and Theological Seminary
- Redeemer University
- Trinity Western University

== Affiliations ==
CAUT is a member of Education International, a global federation of education workers' trade unions.

Twenty-five member associations of CAUT are also members of the National Union of the Canadian Association of University Teachers, a trade union affiliated to the Canadian Labour Congress.

== Presidents ==
- 1951–1952: F. A. Knox
- 1952–1954: F. S. Howes
- 1954–1956: V. C. Fowke
- 1956–1958: H. W. McCready
- 1958–1959: Clarence Barber
- 1959–1960: Harold Good
- 1960–1961: J. H. Aitchison
- 1961–1962: A. Carrothers
- 1962–1963: Emile Gosselin
- 1963–1964: R. W. Torrens
- 1964–1965: Bora Laskin
- 1965–1966: Jacques St-Pierre
- 1966–1967: Gideon Rosenbluth
- 1967–1968: Howard McCurdy
- 1968–1969: C. B. Macpherson
- 1969–1970: Willard Allen
- 1970–1971: Gordin Kaplan
- 1971–1972: Robert Bertrand
- 1972–1973: Charles C. Bigelow
- 1973–1974: Evelyn Moore
- 1974–1975: Richard Spencer
- 1975–1976: David Braybrooke
- 1976–1977: Jill Vickers
- 1977–1978: Gordon Jones
- 1979–1980: Roland Penner
- 1980–1981: Israel Unger
- 1981–1982: Jim Foulks
- 1982–1983: Ken McGovern
- 1983–1985: Sarah Shorten
- 1985–1986: Ed Anderson
- 1986–1987: Allan Sharp
- 1987–1988: John Evans
- 1988–1989: Peter King
- 1989–1990: Pamela Smith
- 1990–1991: Robert W. Kerr
- 1991–1992: Fred Wilson
- 1992–1994: Alan Andrews
- 1994–1996: Joyce Lorimer
- 1996–1998: William Bruneau
- 1998–2000: William Graham
- 2000–2002: Thomas Booth
- 2002–2004: Victor M. Catano
- 2004–2006: Loretta Czernis
- 2006–2008: Greg Allain
- 2008–2011: Penni Stewart
- 2011–2014: Wayne Peters
- 2014–2016: Robin Vose
- 2016–2019: James Compton
- 2019–2022: Brenda Austin-Smith
- 2022–2025: Peter McInnis
- 2025–present: Robin Whitaker

== Archives ==
There is a Canadian Association of University Teachers fond at Library and Archives Canada. The archival reference number is R7226, former archival reference number MG28-I208. The fond covers the date range 1951 to 2004. It consists of 115.65 meters of textual records, and a number of audio records and photographs.

The Archival papers of James B. Conacher, a founding member of CAUT, are held at the University of Toronto Archives and Records Management Services.

== See also ==
- Fair Employment Week
- Affiliated unions of the Canadian Labour Congress
