= McCaul's Pond =

Universisty of Toronto feature

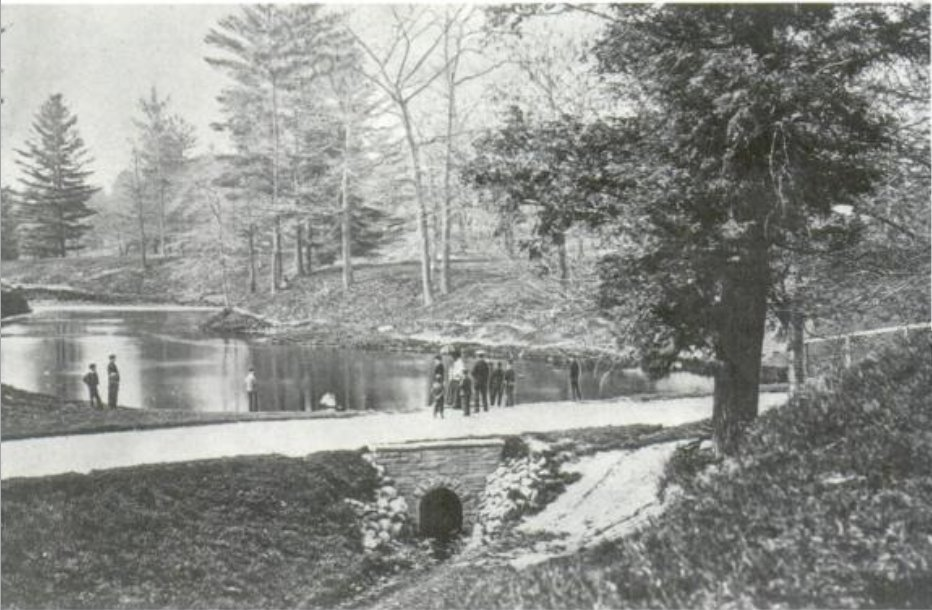
- McCaul's Pond at the site of Hart House, on the University of Toronto campus in 1870

- Location within Toronto Location within Canada
- Interactive map of McCaul's Pond
- Location: University of Toronto, Toronto
- Coordinates: 43.6644°N 79.3944°W
- Type: Pond
- River sources: Taddle Creek
- Basin countries: Canada
- First flooded: 1860s

McCaul's Pond was located at the site of Hart House, on the St. George campus of the University of Toronto. It was created by damming Taddle Creek in the early 1860s. Increased settlement and economic activity had already begun changing the creek from being the clear, free running watercourse that the early settlers had found. It had been so clean that it was a breeding ground for salmon, but over time had become a polluted watercourse. Damming the creek accelerated the dangers and the pond was drained prior to burying the University's portion of the creek in 1884.
