= France Martineau =

Canadian linguist

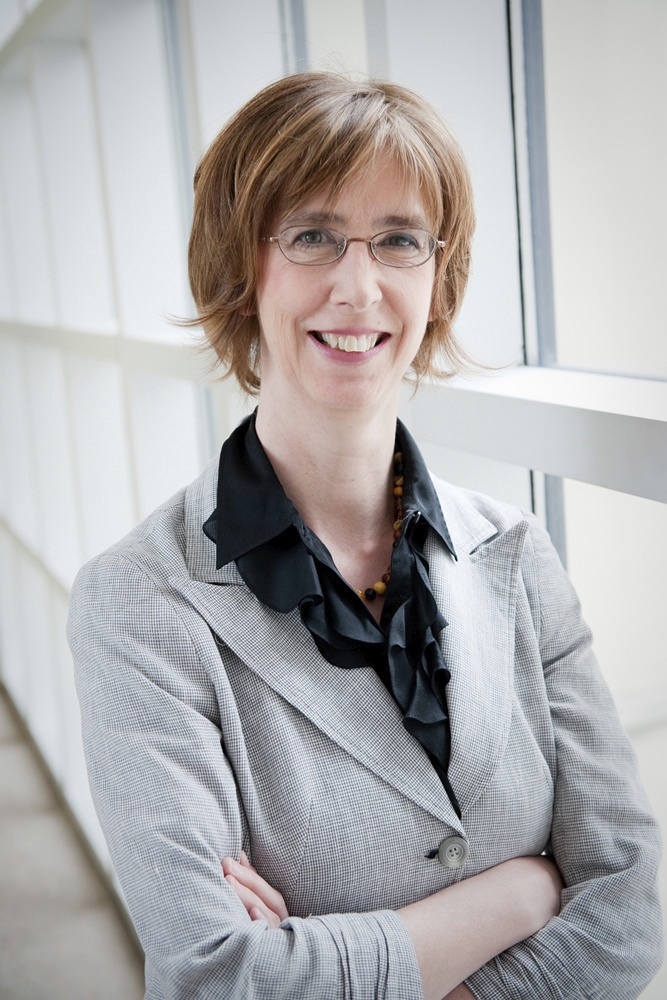
- Occupation: Linguist

France Martineau is a Canadian professor and linguist. She is an expert in Canadian French linguistics and considered a leader in historical sociolinguistics as well as a pioneer in the digital humanities. She presently holds the University of Ottawa Research Chair Le français en mouvement: Frontières, réseaux et contacts en Amérique française.

Marineau currently works at the University of Ottawa in Ontario, Canada, assigned to both the Linguistics Department and the French Department.

== Biography and achievements ==
Martineau was the director of the project Modéliser le changement : les voies du français, from 2005 to 2010, funded by the Major Collaborative Research Initiatives (MCRI) of the Social Sciences and Humanities Research Council (SSHRC). This project, initiated by Martineau, has been involved with the development of digitized corpora that have supported numerous research activities and conferences worldwide in the field of French historical sociolinguistics.

Martineau is one of very few researchers to obtain a second MCRI grant. On March 16, 2011 at the University of Ottawa, in the company of such distinguished guests as Member of Parliament Royal Galipeau and the President of the University, Allan Rock, it was officially announced that Martineau had been awarded $2.5 million in research funding for the international and interdisciplinary project Le français à la mesure d'un continent: un patrimoine en partage. Rock stressed the importance of this project, which will enhance Canada's standing as a leader in international research on the French language.

Martineau is editor of the Voies du français collection published by the Presses de l'Université Laval, and has been president of the Canadian Linguistics Association since 2011 (vice-president since 2009).

She manages the Laboratoire des Polyphonies, where students learn and apply new skills.

== Publications ==
- Martineau, France (2019). Ressacs. Éditions Sémaphore. Roman
- Martineau, France, Annette Boudreau, Yves Frenette, Françoise Gadet (2018). Francophonies nord-américaines: langues, frontières et idéologies, Québec, Presses de l'Université Laval, 554p.
- Frenette, Yves and France Martineau (2018). Les Voyages de Charles Morin, charpentier canadien-français. Texte établi par France Martineau, Québec, Presses de l'Université Laval, 580p.
- Martineau, France and Raymond Mougeon (2003). « Sociolinguistic Research on the Origins of ne Deletion in European and Quebec French » Language, Vol. 79, No. 1, pp. 118–152.
- Martineau, France and Marcel Bénéteau (2010). Incursion dans le Détroit. Édition critique du Jour Naille Commansé Le 29. octobre 1765 pour Le voiage que je fais au Mis a Mis, Quebec City, Presses de l’Université Laval, 136 pp.
- Martineau, France et Terry Nadasdi (2011). Le français en contact. Hommages à Raymond Mougeon, Québec, Presses de l’Université Laval, 460 pp.
- Lusignan, Serge, France Martineau, Yves Charles Morin et Paul Cohen (2012). L'introuvable unité du français. Contacts et variations linguistiques en Europe et en Amérique (XII^{e}-XVIII^{e} siècle), Québec, Presses de l’Université Laval, 328 pp.
- Martineau, France (2016). Bonsoir la muette. Éditions Sémaphore. Récit
- Martineau France (2016). « Écrire la parole entravée », dans Jo Ann Champagne (dir.) Une incorrigible passion, Montréal, Fides, p. 113-134. Nouvelle

== Honours and distinctions ==
- In 2004, Martineau was named Professor of the Year by the Faculty of Arts at the University of Ottawa.
- In 2009, she was named one of "16 extraordinary women" at the University of Ottawa.
- In 2009, she was appointed to the University Research Chair in Language and Migration in French America.
- In 2011, she received funding from the Leaders Opportunity Fund of the Canada Foundation for Innovation (CFI).
- In 2011, she was elected a member of the Royal Society of Canada.
- In 2012, she was granted the Excellence in Research Award from the University of Ottawa.
- In 2014, she was appointed to the University of Ottawa Research Le français en mouvement: frontières, réseaux et contacte en Amérique française.
- In 2015, she was conferred the title of Distinguished Professor at the University of Ottawa.
- In 2017, she won the National Achievement Award 2017 of the Canadian Linguistic Association (ACL).
- In 2018, she won the Ordre des francophones d'Amérique du Conseil supérieur de la langue française.
- In 2020, the book L'individu et sa langue Hommages à France Martineau was published in her honour, edited by Wim Remysen and Sandrine Tailleur, Presses de l'Université Laval.
- In 2021, she was conferred the title of emeritus professor at the University of Ottawa.
