= Yves Roberge =

Canadian linguist

Principal of New College, Toronto
- In office 2010 – 2017
- Preceded by: Shahrzad Mojab (interim)
- Succeeded by: Bonnie McElhinny

Personal details
- Education: University of Sherbrooke (BA, MA); University of British Columbia (PhD)
- Occupation: Linguist
- Awards: National Achievement Award
- Website: https://discover.research.utoronto.ca/11172-yves-roberge

Yves Roberge is professor emeritus of linguistics in the French Department at the University of Toronto and adjunct professor in the School of Languages, Linguistics and Culture at the University of Victoria.

== Education ==
Roberge attended the University of Sherbrooke and received a BA in French Studies in 1981 and an MA in linguistics in 1983. He finished his PhD in Linguistics at the University of British Columbia in 1986.

== Career ==
Roberge was president of the Canadian Linguistic Association from 2005 to 2007 and the principal of New College at the University of Toronto from 2010 through 2017. His research focuses on the syntax and semantics of French and other Romance languages, especially Canadian French. He also researches dialectal variation, first language acquisition, and the syntax-morphology interface. He is well known for his work on implicit (or silent) arguments, which he has studied from both a theoretical perspective and an acquisition perspective, and which is the subject of his book The Syntactic Recoverability of Null Arguments, published in 1990.

In 2015, Roberge received the National Achievement Award presented by the Canadian Linguistic Association for his "leadership and substantial, innovative, and distinguished contributions to language research." Roberge was the sixth winner in the award's history.
