= Philosopher's Walk (Toronto) =

Scenic footpath, Toronto, Ontario, Canada

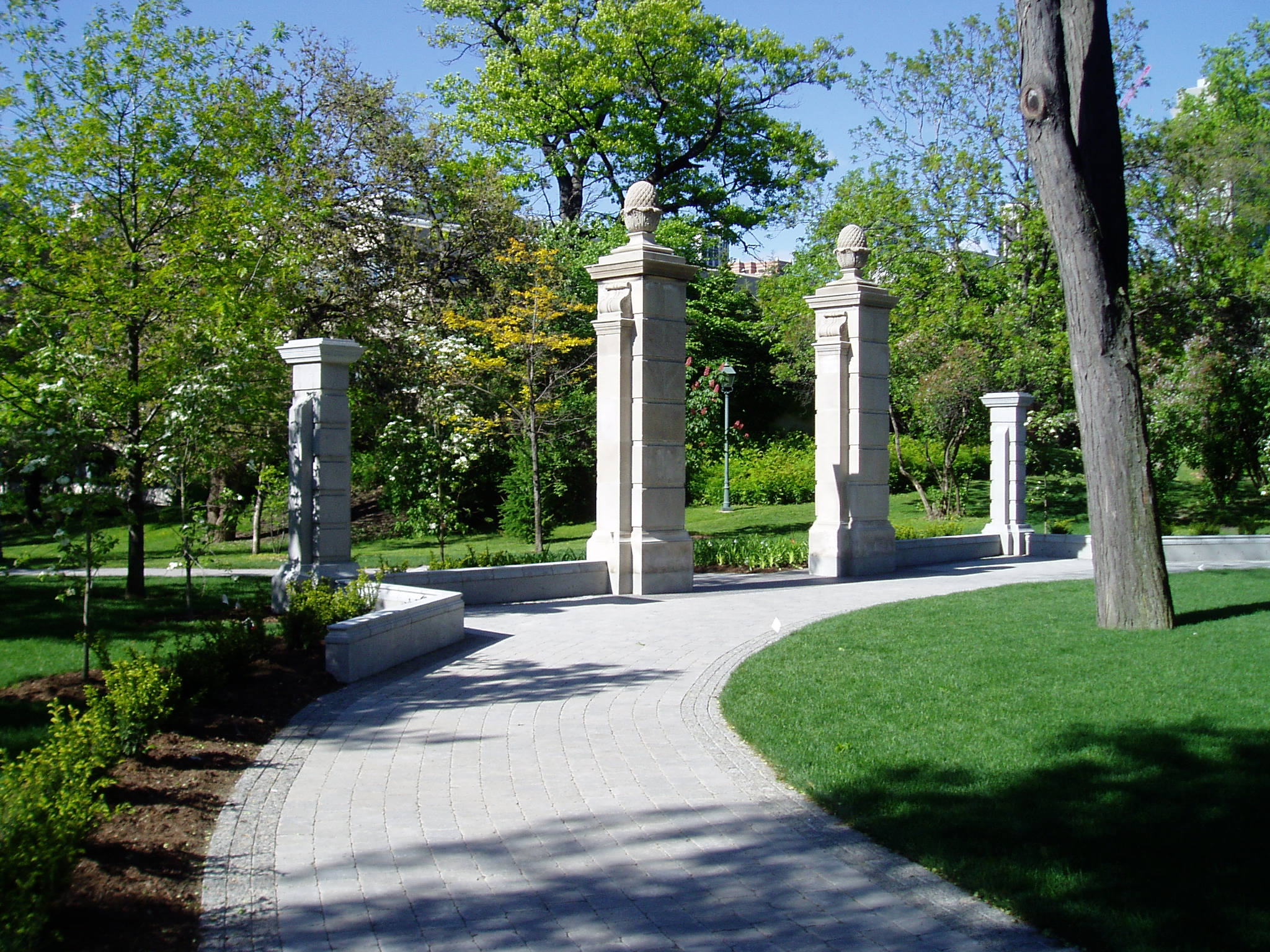
- The southern entrance to Philosopher's Walk
- Location: Toronto, Ontario, Canada
- Location within Ontario
- Coordinates: 43.666960°N 79.395217°W

Philosopher's Walk is a scenic footpath along the St. George campus of the University of Toronto in Toronto, Ontario. It runs in the north–south direction along the ravine landscape created by Taddle Creek, once a natural waterway that was buried during the Industrial Age and is now flowing underground. The path is bounded by several Toronto landmarks, including the Royal Ontario Museum, the Royal Conservatory of Music, Trinity College, the University of Toronto's Faculty of Music, and the Henry N.R. Jackman Faculty of Law.

Philosopher's Walk links the heart of the university campus to the northern edge bounding The Annex, an academic neighborhood where many of the university's faculty and student body reside. Philosopher Ted Honderich described the walk from his experience as a student

[The University of Toronto] was in the middle of the city and had good Victorian buildings, and also such necessary pieces of tradition as a Philosopher's Walk, which led out towards an old village enclosed by the growth of Toronto. The village had not yet been smartened up, and only those academics so supremely rational as to want to walk to work lived in it.

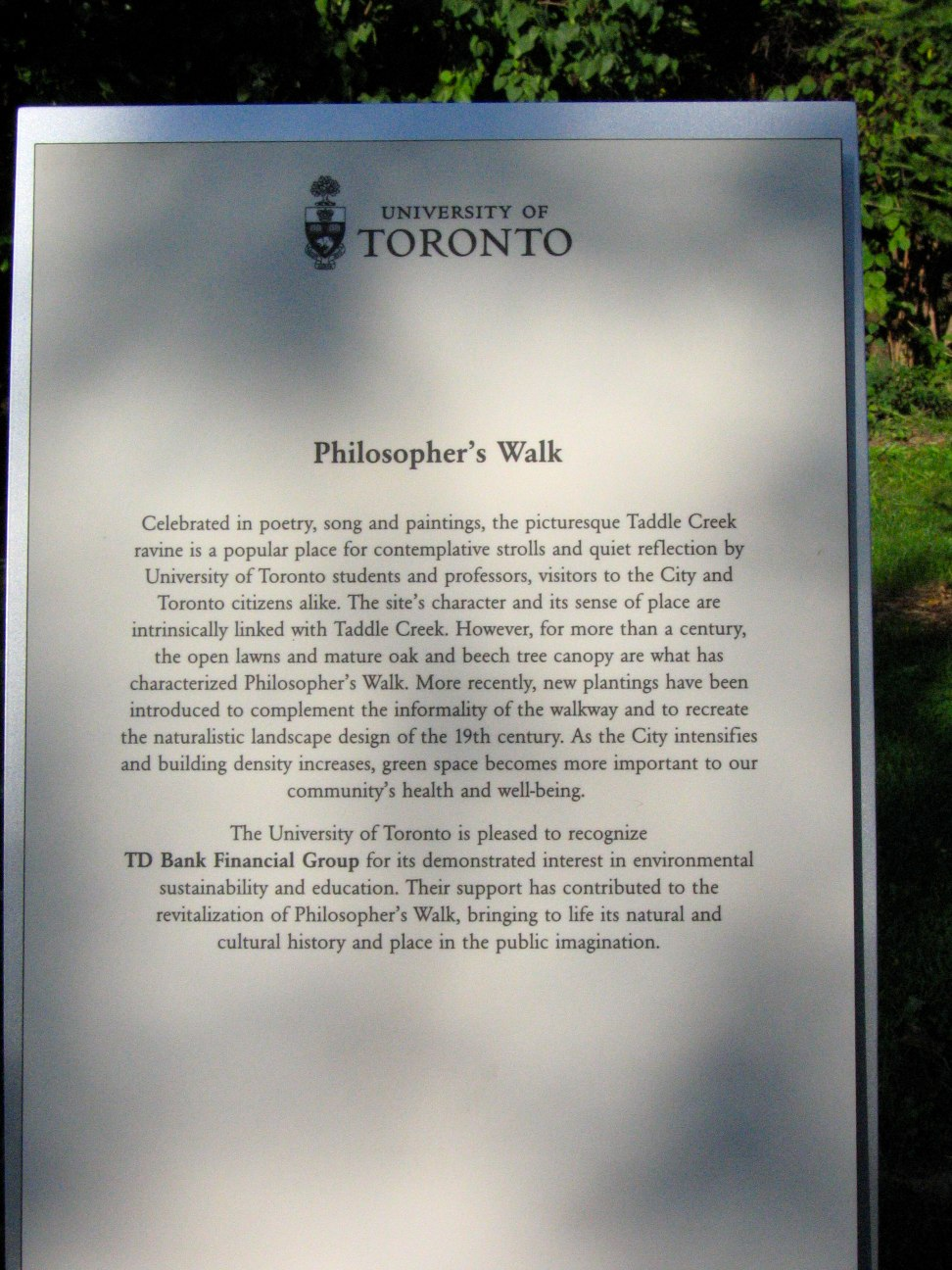
A plaque along Philosopher's Walk

The Alexandra Gates at the northern entrance to the path were constructed at the corner of Bloor Street and Avenue Road in 1901, at the instigation of the Imperial Order Daughters of the Empire, and to commemorate the visit of Prince George, Duke of Cornwall (later King George V), and Mary, Duchess of Cornwall (later Queen Mary), that year. The letters on each post — E and A — stand for Edward and Alexandra, the reigning King and Queen at the time. When Avenue Road was widened in 1960, the gates were moved to the head of Philosopher's Walk. In recognition of the royal visit, a plaque at the site reads "To commemorate the visit of T.R.H The Duke and Duchess of Cornwall and York Oct. 10th 1901".

The small amphitheater on the walk was built around 2010.
