= University of Toronto Campus Safety =

Campus police service of the University of Toronto

Agency overview
- Formed: 1904; 122 years ago
- Annual budget: $4,257,113 (2020-2021, St. George campus exclusively)
- Legal personality: Special constabulary

Jurisdictional structure
- Legal jurisdiction: Property owned or used by the University of Toronto
- Governing body: Toronto Police Services Board, Peel Police Services Board, University Affairs Board

Operational structure
- Headquarters: 21 Sussex Avenue, Toronto, Ontario
- Special constables: 34 (St. George); 14 (Scarborough); 15 (Mississauga)
- Non-sworn members: 8 (Scarborough); 12 (Mississauga)

Facilities
- Stations: 3

Website
- St. George Campus Safety; Scarborough Campus Safety; Mississauga Campus Safety

The University of Toronto Campus Safety Special Constable Service (generally referred to as the University of Toronto Campus Safety Service or simply Campus Safety) is a special constabulary that provides police services to the three campuses of the University of Toronto. The Service was formed as the University of Toronto Police Force in 1904 and, as of 2022, serves roughly 97,000 students and 25,000 faculty and staff.

Because of the University of Toronto's de-centralized tri-campus structure, the Service is organized into three functionally separate groups (St. George, Scarborough, and Mississauga), which — despite sharing a common brand identity and some policies — are operated, managed, and trained separately.

== History ==
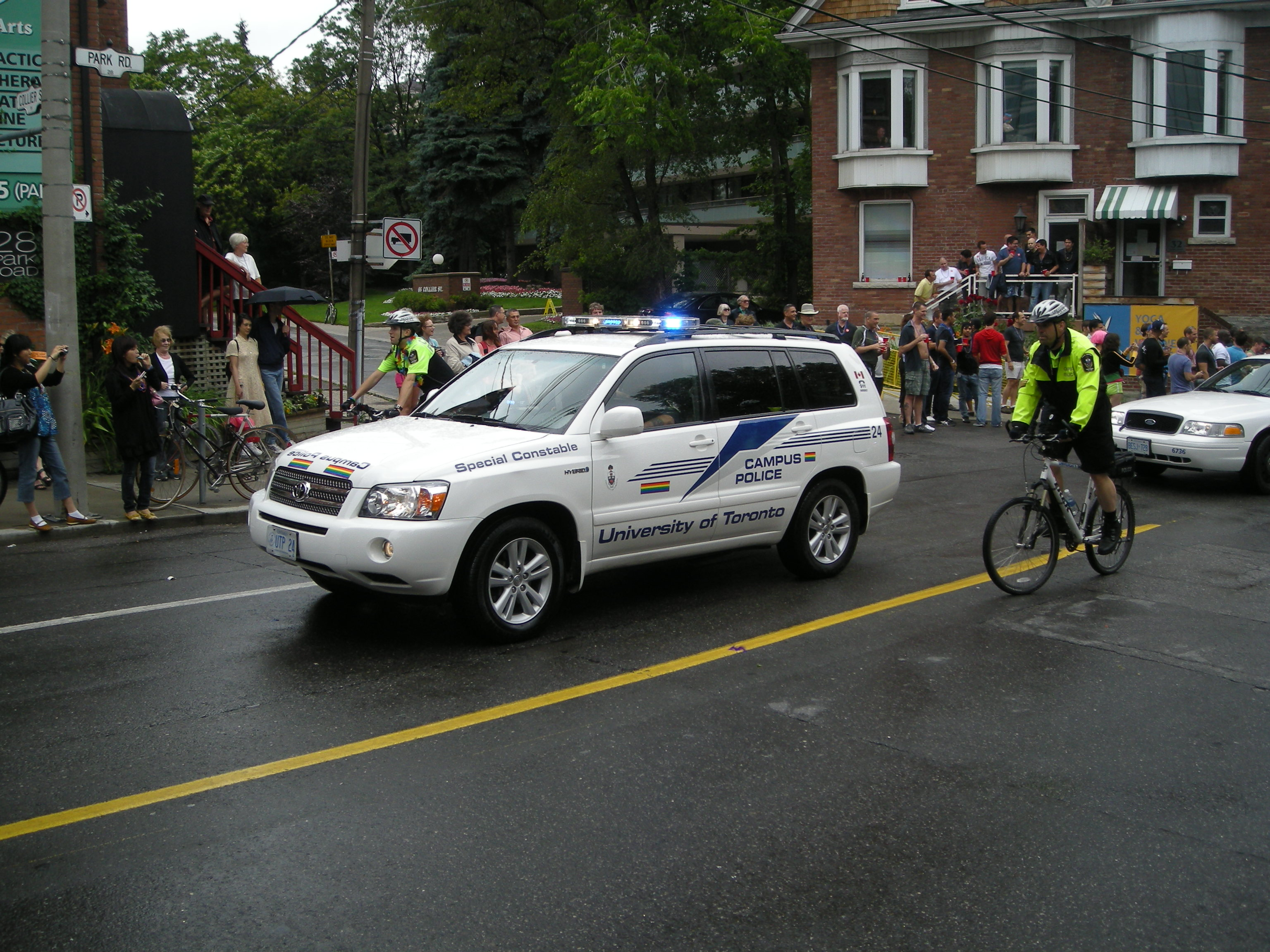
A Toyota Highlander Hybrid previously used by the Campus Safety division.

The campus police force at the University of Toronto was organized in 1904, when the first police constable was hired to handle disciplinary matters on the St. George campus. The special constables were appointed and overseen by the province until 1995, when this responsibility was downloaded to the Toronto and Peel Region police services boards.

A second campus police service was organized in 1963 with the foundation of the university's Scarborough campus, followed closely by a third when the University established Erindale College in Mississauga in 1966. The Erindale College Police Force was rebranded in 1998, when the College was rebranded as University of Toronto Mississauga.

In 2003, after a rash of assaults against special constables, the St. George campus police group requested permission from the Toronto Police Services Board to carry batons. The authority to carry batons was later granted to all three campus police forces.

In 2004, the provincial government compelled police services boards, including the Toronto and Peel boards, to require that campus police forces change their names from "University Police" to "Campus Community Police" or a non-police title. Subsequently, all three campuses adopted "Campus Community Police" brands.

In 2019, the Comprehensive Police Services Act came into force, prohibiting special constabularies from referring to themselves as "police" organizations without express permission of the Ministry of the Solicitor General. Accordingly, in 2021, all three campuses dropped the "Campus Community Police" brand, and instead adopted a "Campus Safety" brand. The new "Campus Safety" title was accompanied by updates to the uniforms and vehicle markings, which were rolled out across all three campuses. Previously, the three campus special constabularies had each used slightly different vehicle liveries.

In 2023, all three campuses introduced the position of Community Crisis Response Coordinator. The Coordinator is responsible for responding alongside special constables to mental health crisis calls, following up with students after these calls, and conducting training for frontline staff.

=== Controversies ===
In 2019, a student seeking mental health support at a University-run clinic was detained under the Mental Health Act and handcuffed by Mississauga campus special constables. The Mental Health Act requires that police officers and special constables detain and transport someone to the hospital if they have specific plans to harm themselves, but, in the 2019 incident, the student was willing to voluntarily attend the hospital. The University launched a review of the role of Campus Safety and the University's policies governing Mental Health Act detentions in the wake of the incident.

== Organization ==
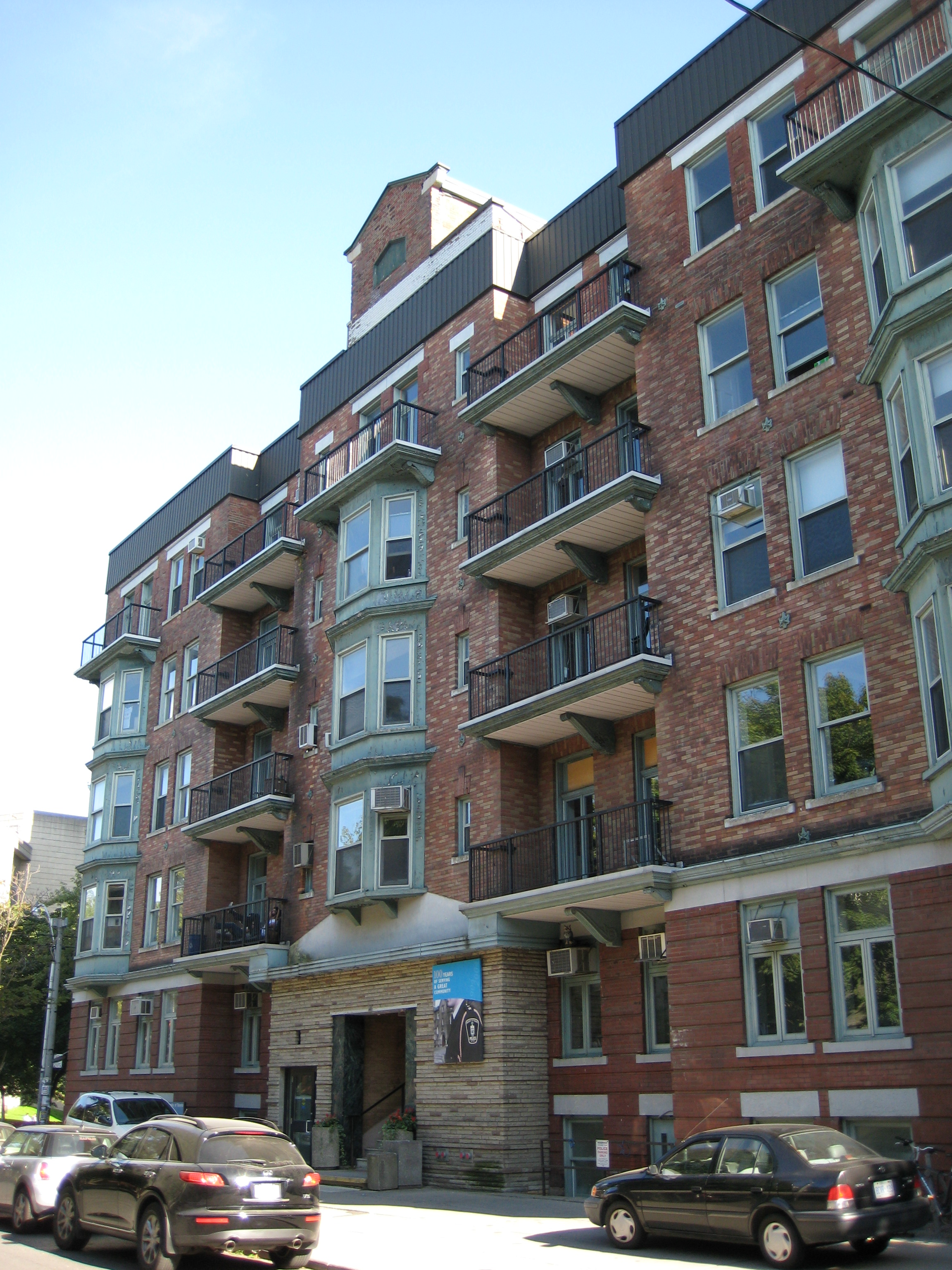
Sussex Court, out of which the St. George division of the Service operates.

The Service is divided into three operational groups, each serving one U of T campus. Although the three groups share common uniforms, some common policies, and a similar structure, each group is operated separately of the other groups, with an independent chain-of-command on each campus. At the University's central St. George campus, the Service is a division of the Facilities and Services department; and at the smaller Scarborough and Mississauga campuses, under the direct supervision of the Chief Administrative Officer.

Supplementing special constables on every campus are licensed security guards, who are referred to as building patrollers. These patrollers do not have any peace officer authority, and are variously responsible for interior patrols of campus buildings; escorting students after dark as requested; checking for dangerous conditions like burnt out lights; and, at the Scarborough and Mississauga campuses, checking IDs to ensure that those on the campus are part of the university community. On the St. George campus, the majority of building patrol positions are contracted out to Executek International.

=== Authority ===
Special constable appointments are issued for each campus independently: a Scarborough campus special constable, for example, is appointed and categorized separately from a St. George campus special constable, even though both constables are appointed by the same police services board.

Special constables have full peace officer authority on property owned or used by their respective campus, and have police authority away from these properties if the offence they are investigating occurred on or in relation to U of T property, or if they are transporting an offender within the City of Toronto (in the case of St. George and Scarborough special constables) or the Regional Municipality of Peel (in the case of Mississauga special constables). In addition to enforcing the university's Student Code of Conduct and some municipal by-laws, special constables have authority to enforce the Criminal Code, the Controlled Drugs and Substances Act, the Trespass to Property Act, the Liquor Licence Act, and section 17 of the Mental Health Act.

=== Rank structure ===
At every campus, building patrollers work parallel to special constables. At the St. George campus, building patrollers answer to the Community Liaison and Support Team; at the Scarborough campus, to a staff sergeant; and at the Mississauga campus, they are integrated with special constables and answer directly to corporals.

==== St. George campus ====
- Director
- Assistant Director
- Staff Sergeant
- Corporal
- Special Constable

==== Scarborough campus ====
- Senior Director
- Assistant Director
- Staff Sergeant
- Corporal
- Special Constable

==== Mississauga campus ====
- Director
- Manager
- Corporal
- Special Constable

=== Community Liaison and Support Team ===
At the St. George campus, investigations, evidence management, crime prevention programs, and the planning of special events and VIP visits is the responsibility of the Community Liaison and Support Team. The Team liaises with local police and other law enforcement partners to complete investigations, and is led by an assistant director. Members of the team are also trained to process crime scenes and collect evidence to forward to the Toronto Police Service.

== Training ==
To be hired as a special constable, applicants are required to have a post-secondary degree. A 5-week orientation course is then provided to special constables, followed by a 12-month probationary period.

Special constables at each campus are trained separately. Because of certain minimum standards laid out by the province and the Toronto and Peel Region Police Services Boards, much of this training overlaps: every special constable, for example, attends an annual use-of-force refresher course, although the provider of these courses vary campus-to-campus. Other courses include training on peer support, de-escalation, micro-aggressions and racial profiling, and autism recognition.

== Equipment ==
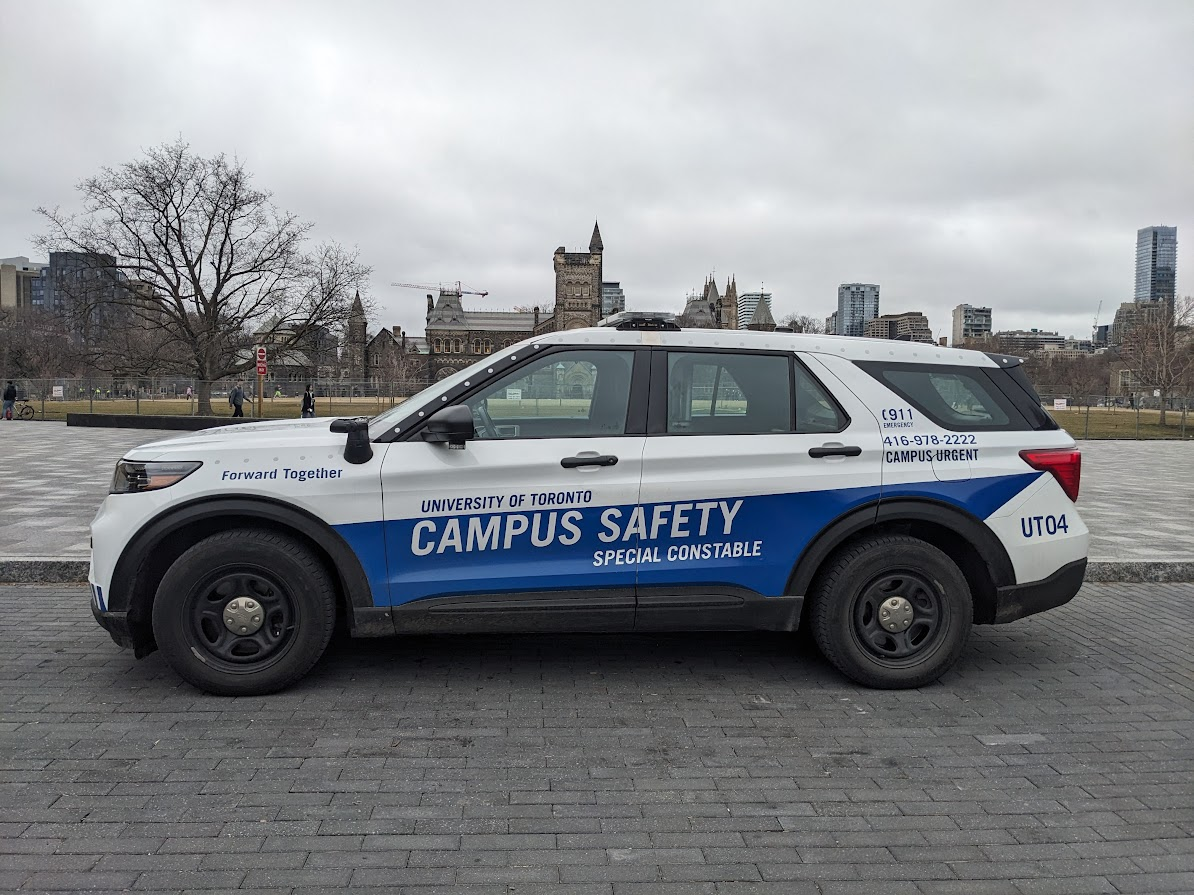
A Ford Police Interceptor used by special constables to patrol the St. George Campus.

=== Weapons ===
All special constables are equipped with expandable batons, but not OC spray, tasers, or firearms.

=== Uniforms ===
Special constables wear one of two uniforms depending on the season: a winter uniform consisting of a navy blue dress shirt and navy cargo pants; or a summer uniform consisting of a hi-visibility lime-and-black polo shirt and black cargo pants. Special constables are also equipped with soft body armour.

Building patrollers wear beige dress shirts and black cargo pants, or, during the summer, grey-and-black polo shirts and black cargo pants.

=== Vehicles ===
Special constables patrol in a mix of marked Ford Police Interceptor Utilities, unmarked minivans and crossovers, and bicycles. At the St. George Campus, special constables also have at their disposal an unmarked Toyota Highlander Hybrid.
