= Canadian Linguistic Association =

Canadian professional organization

- Abbreviation: CLA
- Formation: 1954
- Type: professional organization of linguists
- Legal status: active
- Purpose: advocate and public voice, educator and network
- Headquarters: Ottawa, Ontario, Canada
- Region served: Canada
- Official language: English, French

The Canadian Linguistic Association (CLA; French: Association canadienne de linguistique, ACL) is the principal professional organization of linguists in Canada. Yearly meetings are held, usually at the end of May, in which members present scholarly research on any area of Linguistics. Every year since 2011, a new exhibit of the Canadian Language Museum has also opened at the annual meeting. The CLA also publishes the Canadian Journal of Linguistics, which is published quarterly. The association was founded in 1954.

The Canadian Linguistic Association also awards an annual National Achievement Award, which has been presented to

- J. K. Chambers (2010)
- Yves Charles-Morin and Shana Poplack (2011)
- Keren Rice (2013)
- Jila Ghomeshi (2014)
- Yves Roberge (2015)
- Marguerite MacKenzie (2016)
- Gary Libben and France Martineau (2017)
- Alana Johns and Lorna Wanosts’a7 Wilson (2018)
- Elaine Gold (2019)

Since 2014, the year's recipient(s) of the National Achievement Award has been invited to give a plenary talk at the annual meeting of the CLA.
