= Taddle Creek =

Stream that was buried underground, Toronto, Ontario, Canada

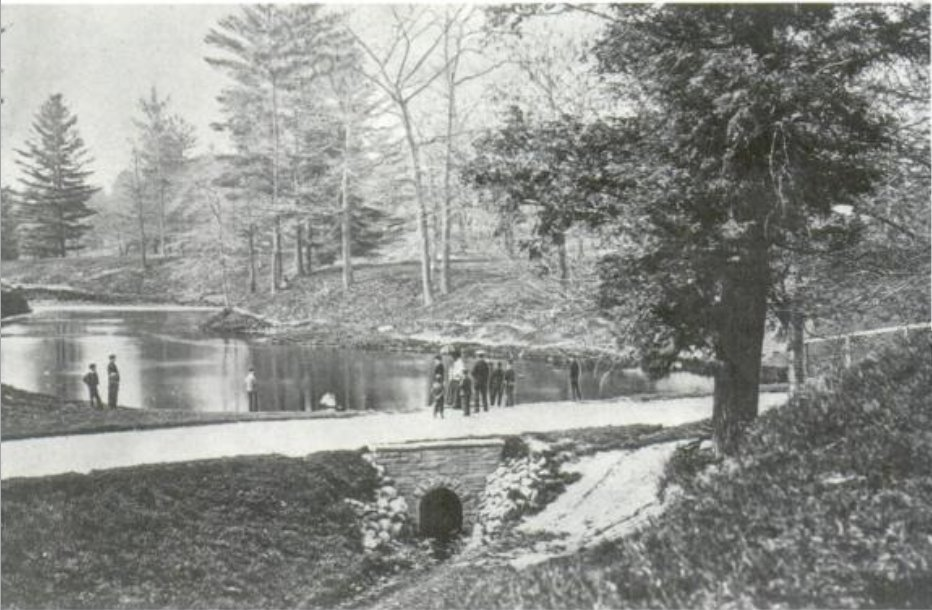
- Taddle Creek, dammed to create McCaul's Pond, on the University of Toronto campus in 1870

Location
- Country: Canada
- Province: Ontario
- City: Toronto

Physical characteristics
- Source
  - location: Bathurst Street and St. Clair Avenue West, Toronto, Ontario, Canada
- Mouth
  - location: Lake Ontario, just east of Parliament Street, Toronto, Ontario, Canada
- Length: 6 km (3.7 mi)

Taddle Creek is a buried stream in Toronto, Ontario, Canada that flowed a southeasterly course about six kilometres long, from St. Clair Avenue west of Bathurst Street through the present site of Wychwood Park, through the St. George campus of the University of Toronto, into the Toronto Harbour near the Distillery District. During the 19th century, it was buried and converted into an underground sewer, but traces of the creek can still be found today. The scenic footpath known as Philosopher's Walk follows the ravine created by the creek from the Royal Ontario Museum to Trinity College. Taddle Creek is also the name of a Toronto literary magazine and of a local Montessori school.

== History ==
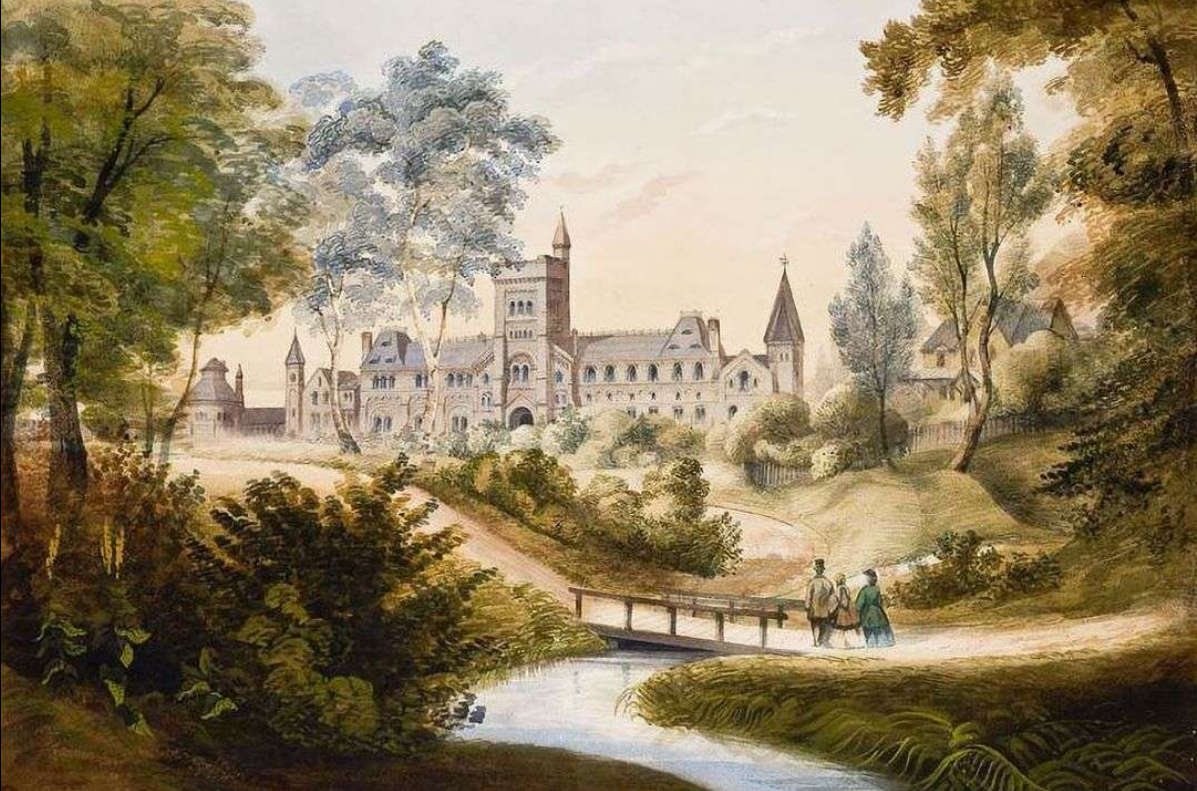
Watercolour painting of Taddle Creek in 1861. University College, Toronto is in the background.

In the 1790s, the original town site of the Town of York was established along its south bank. Its waters would be used by its first industries. The disappearance of the creek came in phases in the 19th century:

- east of Church Street - before 1860
- Elizabeth Street to Church Street - early 1866
- University of Toronto sections including McCaul's Pond - 1886

There is no exact origin for the creek's name but there are three possible theories:

- named for the Tattle family of Toronto
- named for the tadpoles that filled the creek
- onomatopoeic link of an English northcountry dialect variant of toddle meaning "to move with a gentle sound, as a stream or river"

Taddle Creek had other names during the 19th Century:

- Little Don River
- Brewery Creek - named for Enoch Turner's brewery
- Goodwin Creek
- University Creek
- Wolz Creek - east of Jarvis after brewer John Wolz (or Walz)

== See also ==
- List of rivers of Ontario
- Taddle Creek (magazine)
- Taddle Creek Park
- University of Toronto
