= New College, Toronto =

Constituent college of the University of Toronto

New College
- Constituent college
- University of Toronto
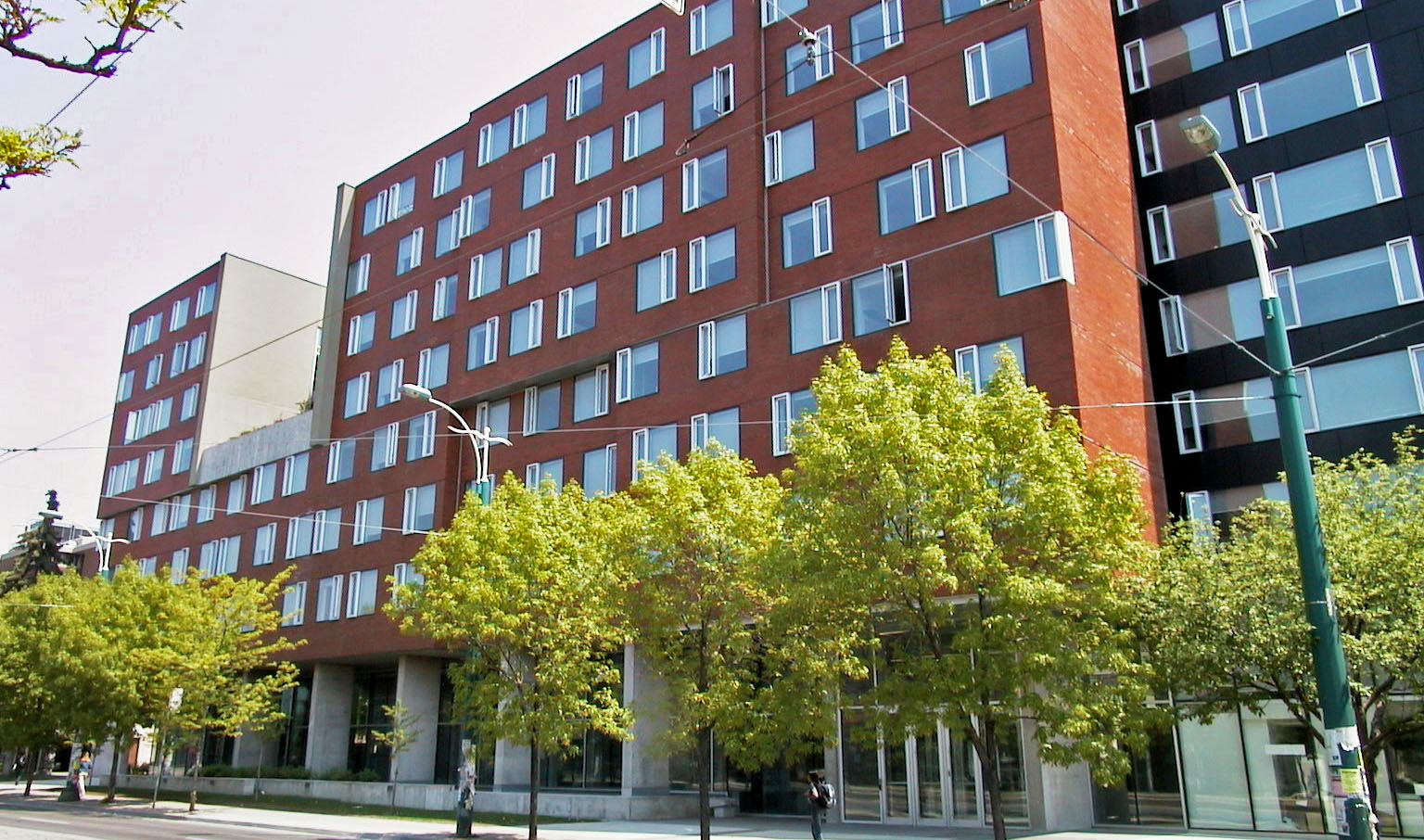

- Location: 300 Huron Street; Toronto, Ontario, Canada
- Coordinates: 43°39′43″N 79°24′02″W
- Motto: Juncta juvant (Latin)
- Motto in English: "Strength in unity"
- Established: 1962; 64 years ago
- Colours: Green
- Principal: Robert Gazzale
- Undergraduates: 4,781
- Mascot: Goliath the Wildebeest
- Website: newcollege.utoronto.ca

New College is a constituent college of the University of Toronto. It is one of the seven colleges in the university's Faculty of Arts and Science and one of its larger colleges, with approximately 5,000 students. New College is situated on Huron Street at the west end of the St. George campus, nestled alongside the Athletic Centre, the Earth Sciences Centre, Sidney Smith Hall and the Ramsey Wright Zoology Laboratory.

== History ==
Founded in 1962, New College was the first college to be created within the University of Toronto since the federation of Victoria, Trinity and St. Michael's Colleges. The name of the college was initially to be "New King's College", in homage to University College, which had been known as King's College before receiving a new royal charter.

== Namesake cousins ==
New College shares, along with Trinity College, St. Hilda's College and University College, the distinction of being Dominion cousins to namesakes in the UK. It is named after New College at the University of Oxford in England, upon which the college system at the University of Toronto is itself modelled.

== Character ==
Designed under the "multi-faculty" concept, the vast majority of its students are from the Faculty of Arts and Science, with the rest drawn from Applied Science and Engineering, Kinesiology and Physical Education, Music, and Pharmacy. In fact, what is now known as Innis College, the second "multi-faculty" college, was originally designed as another wing of New College before it was built separately in 1964.

Housed in an integrated "serpentine" design, New College consists of three halls: Wilson Hall, Wetmore Hall, and a new hall aptly named New Building (built in 2003). Employing an integrated approach to living, residence units are located on the upper floors; the lower floors include the library and reading room, computer labs, staff offices, lecture theatres, dining hall and recreation lounges. The New Building also houses the William Doo Auditorium and a mini-gym.

New College's on-campus accommodation is well appointed for students who wish to live near many of the central facilities of University of Toronto, such as Robarts Library, Sidney Smith Hall, the Athletic Centre, and the Lash-Miller chemical laboratories.

== Student life ==
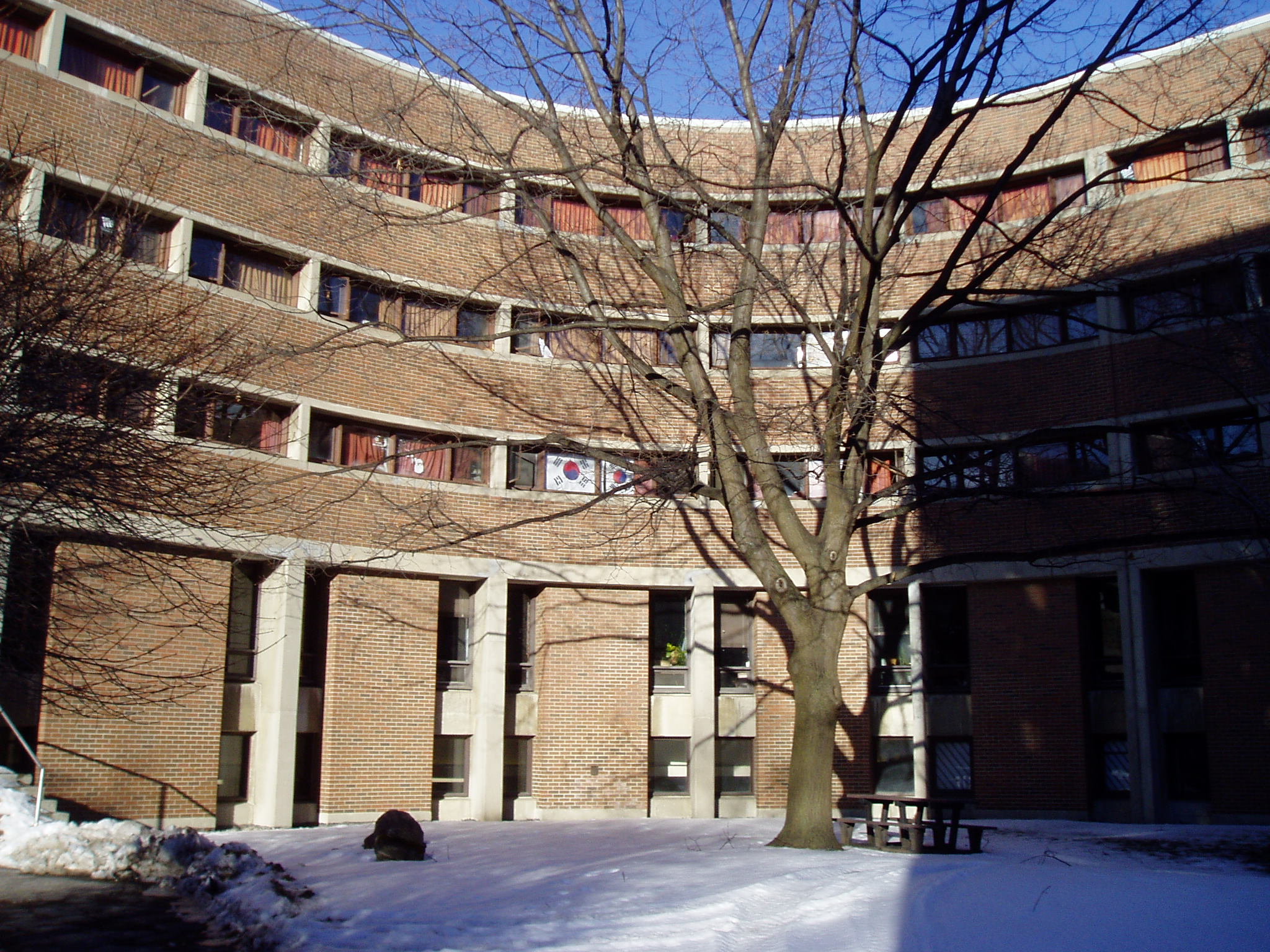
A section of the New College complex

New College has an extremely multicultural student body, with more than three-quarters of its students drawn from the ranks of new Canadians. Both the New College Residence Council (serving students who live at the college) and the New College Student Council (serving residents and commuters) plan activities that feature the college's diversity. A highlight of the year, usually held in the winter term, is Mosaic, which is an evening of music, dance and performance featuring multiethnic themes. The Student Council generally uses the William Doo Auditorium for Mosaic, and also for other events such as movie nights and musical concerts.

For students in residence at New College, social life is aided by their floor residence council. The floor residence council organizes restaurant trips, movie nights, field trips (trapeze training, rock climbing, bowling, etc.) and other activities. Each residence floor benefits from a don. New College dons are graduate or upper year students who live with the undergraduates and provide them with advice and support. The New College Residence Council oversees student life specifically for students who live in residence.

Residence student life is also generally anchored around the college's cafeteria. The dining area is large, with a number of different dishes available at each mealtime. Vegetarian, Vegan and Halal meals are offered.

In 2008, the college replaced the Dean of Residence position with a new Director of Student Life. This senior administrator is charged not only with running the residence operation but developing student life programming that integrates the 3,000-plus commuting students into the wider New College community. In addition, the college's commitment to social justice and equity is now woven through many of its extracurricular programs, a development evidenced by the 2009 appointment of a service-learning coordinator.

== Specialization ==
New College's mission around round equity and social justice is reflected in many of its programs, such as African Studies, Caribbean Studies and Equity Studies. The college continues to maintain its connections with the field of engineering and the life sciences. Many of its early officers were from science backgrounds, including Stewart Wilson (Engineering), the first registrar and Donald Ivey (Medicine), the college's first principal. Today, like several of the colleges at the University of Toronto, New College coordinates a number of academic degree programmes, Human Biology being a prominent program for aspiring MD's.

New College hosts the annual University of Toronto Youth Summer Program, organized jointly by New College and the University of Toronto's faculties of Law and Medicine. The Youth Summer Program is an academic program for high school students that provides early experience in law and medical sciences.

== Principals ==
The following is a list of principals (executive heads) of New College.

- Frank Wetmore (1962–1963)
- Donald Ivey (1963–1974)
- Andrew Baine (1974–1979)
- Robert Lockhart (1979–1985)
- Edward Chamberlin (1985–1990)
- Guy Hamel (interim, 1990–1991)
- Frederick Case (1991–1996)
- David Clandfield (1996–2006)
- Rick Halpern (2006–2009)
- Shahrzad Mojab (interim, 2009–2010)
- Yves Roberge (2010–2017)
- Bonnie McElhinny (2017–2023)
- Dickson Eyoh (interim, 2023–2024)
- Robert Gazzale (2024–present)
