= Amir Hassanpour =

Iranian scholar

- Hassanpour in 2012
- Born: November 17, 1943; Mahabad, Iran
- Died: June 24, 2017 (age 73); Toronto, Ontario, Canada
- Education: University of Illinois Urbana-Champaign; University of Tehran
- Spouse: Shahrzad Mojab
- Scientific career
- Workplaces: University of Toronto

Amir Hassanpour (Persian: امیر حسن‌پور, Kurdish: ئه‌میر حه‌سه‌نپوور, romanized: Emîr Hesenpûr; 17 November 1943 – 24 June 2017) was an Iranian and Kurdish scholar and researcher.

He was a supporter of Kurdish studies and the rights of national minorities to self-determination.

== Biography ==
He was born in Mahabad, in north-western Iran. He received his B.A. degree in English language in 1964 from the University of Tehran. He taught in the secondary schools of Mahabad in the short period of 1965–1966.

In 1968, he began studying linguistics at Tehran University, and received his M.A. in 1970. He finished his doctoral work in 1972, while teaching for a year at the University of Tehran. Then he went to the University of Illinois at Urbana-Champaign, where he studied Communication studies, and received his Ph.D. in 1989 in the field of sociolinguistics and contemporary Middle Eastern history. The title of his thesis is The Language Factor in National Development: The Standardization of the Kurdish Language, 1918–1985. His thesis was published as a book under the title Nationalism and Language in Kurdistan 1918–1985, by Edwin Mellen Press; illustrated edition (May 1992) .

He has made numerous contributions to academic journals, the Encyclopedia of Television, and Encyclopaedia Iranica.

== Career ==
He lived in Canada from 1986, and taught at University of Windsor, Concordia University, and University of Toronto. He was associate professor at the Department of Near and Middle Eastern Civilizations at the University of Toronto. His areas of interest for the course were media, conflict and democracy and critical approaches to nationalism, ethnic conflict, genocide, and social movements. He died, aged 73, in Toronto.

Hassanpour was a Marxist scholar combining theoretical knowledge with his practical activities for freedom and social justice. He wrote scholarly work on the crime of genocide with special focus on the Armenian and Assyrian genocides of 1915 to 1921 in the Ottoman Empire. He was among few scholars who attracted global attention to the Assyrian genocide.
