= Canadian Journal of Linguistics =

- Discipline: Linguistics
- Language: English, French
- Edited by: Heather Newell, Daniel Siddiqi

Publication details
- History: 1954-present
- Publisher: Cambridge University Press on behalf of the Canadian Linguistic Association
- Frequency: Triannually

Standard abbreviations
- ISO 4: Can. J. Linguist.

Indexing
- ISSN: 0008-4131 (print); 1710-1115 (web)
- LCCN: 91645410
- OCLC no.: 654708127

Links
- Journal homepage; Online access; Online archive; Online archive at Project MUSE

The Canadian Journal of Linguistics (French: Revue canadienne de linguistique) is a triannual peer-reviewed academic journal covering theoretical and applied linguistics. It is published by Cambridge University Press on behalf of the Canadian Linguistic Association. The journal was established in 1954 as the Journal of the Canadian Linguistic Association. It changed its name to the current title in 1961. The editor-in-chief is Heather Newell (Université du Québec à Montréal). The co-editor is Daniel Siddiqi.

== Abstracting and indexing ==
The journal is abstracted and indexed in the Arts and Humanities Citation Index, Current Contents/Arts & Humanities, and Scopus.
