= Shahrzad Mojab =

Iranian academic

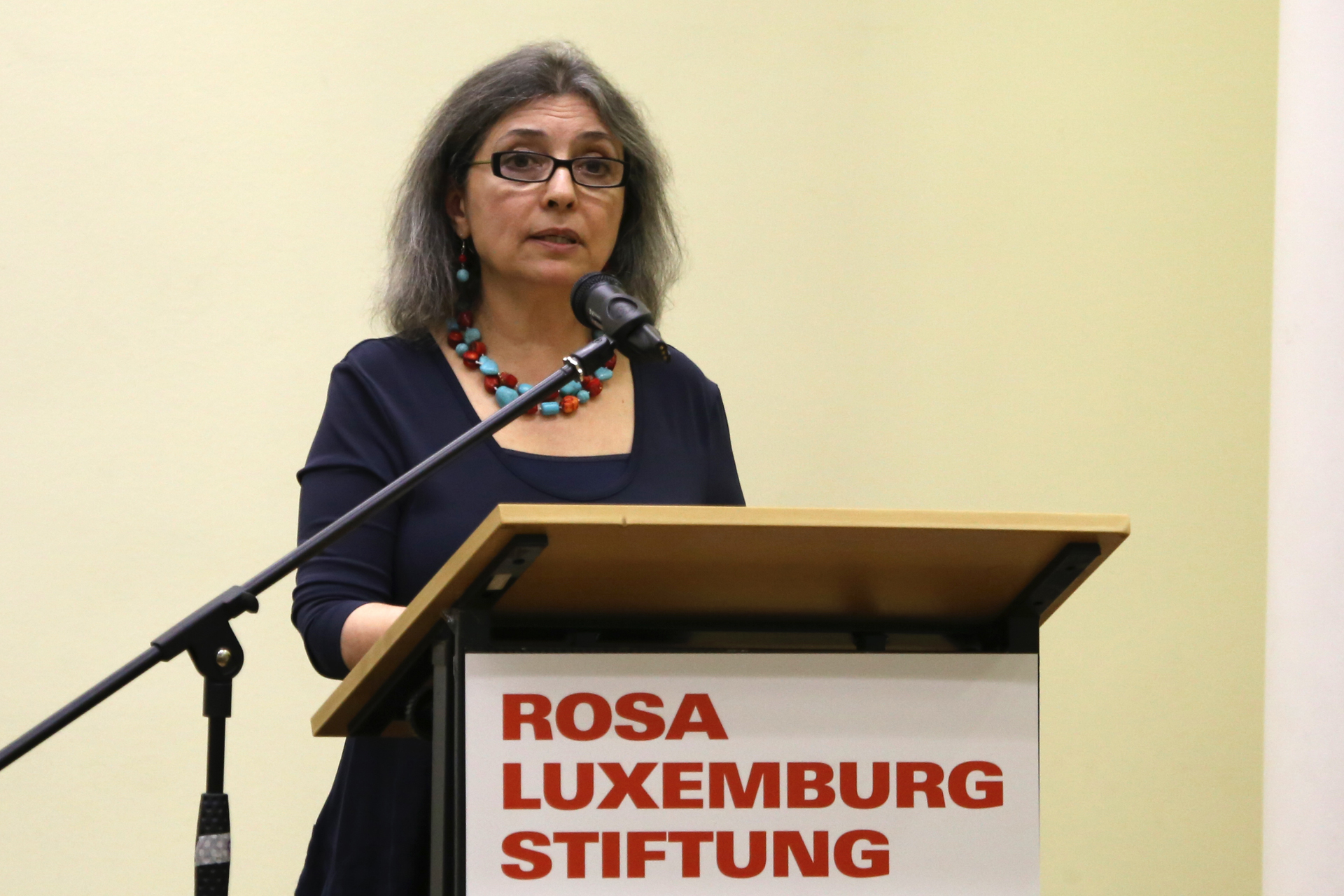

Principal of New College, Toronto
- Interim; 2009 – 2010
- Preceded by: Rick Halpern
- Succeeded by: Yves Roberge

Personal details
- Born: Shiraz, Iran
- Scientific career
- Education: College of Translation, Tehran (BA); University of Illinois at Urbana-Champaign (MA, PhD)
- Spouse: Amir Hassanpour
- Awards: Royal Society of Canada Award in Gender Studies
- Fields: Impact of war, displacement and violence on women's learning and education.
- Workplaces: University of Toronto
- Thesis: The state and university: The Islamic Cultural Revolution in the institutions of higher education of Iran, 1980-1987 (1991)
- Doctoral advisor: Steve Tozer
- Website: www.oise.utoronto.ca/lhae/Faculty_Staff/1508/Shahrzad_Mojab.html

Shahrzad Mojab is an academic activist and professor, teaching at the Department of Leadership, Higher and Adult Education in the Ontario Institute for Studies in Education (OISE), and Women and Gender Studies Institute in the Faculty of Arts and Science at the University of Toronto. Shahrzad has been living in Canada since 1986 with her lifelong partner, colleague and comrade, Amir Hassanpour, and their son, Salah.

== Education and career ==
Mojab was born in Shiraz, Iran. She obtained her Bachelor of Arts in 1977 in Iran in the English language; her Master of Arts in Comparative Education and Administration, Higher and Continuing Education in 1979 and her Ph.D. in Educational Policy Studies and Women's Studies in 1991 both at the University of Illinois at Urbana-Champaign. She spent four years (1979-1983) in post-revolutionary Iran, where she became active in the left movement, women’s movement and the Kurdish autonomous movement. Before joining the University of Toronto in 1996, Shahrzad taught and worked at University of Windsor, Ryerson University and at Concordia University.

Mojab served as interim principal of New College at the University of Toronto from 2009 to 2010, succeeded by Yves Roberge.

During the Shafia family murders trial, Mojab testified as an expert witness for the crown to explain the concept of honour killing.

== Research ==
Mojab's areas of research and teaching include education policy studies; gender, state, diaspora and transnationality; women, war, militarization and violence; women, war and learning; women political prisoners in the Middle East; transnational women's organizations; feminism, anti-racism, colonialism and imperialism; Marxist-feminism and learning; adult education in comparative and global perspectives. Her approach to the study of race, gender, class, nationality, transnationality, and ethnicity is informed by Marxist feminist dialectical, and historical materialism approach. She is critical of theoretical frameworks which treat race, gender, and class atomistically, and reduce them to the domains of discourse, text, language, or identity. She critiques monopolies of knowledge and power in education, and advocates dialogical and inclusive pedagogical practices. Mojab's research has been published on Islamic feminism, minority women in academe, diversity and academic freedom in Canadian and Iranian universities, adult education and civil society in the Middle East, feminism and nationalism, state-university relation, and women's access to higher education.

Her publications include, among others, articles and book chapters which have appeared in periodicals such as International Journal of Lifelong long Education; Feminist Review; Canadian Woman Studies Journal; Journal of Middle East Women's Studies; Journal of Ethnicities; Resources for Feminist Research; The Canadian Journal for the Study of Adult Education; Adult Education Quarterly: A Journal of Research and Theory; Studies in Continuing Education; Al-Raida Magazine (Institute for Women’s Studies in the Arab World); Pakistan Journal of Women’s Studies: Alam-e-Niswan; Journal of Race, Gender, and Class; and Atlantis: A Women’s Studies Journal. Shahrzad writes in Persian and Kurdish and her work is translated into Arabic, French, German, Kurdish, Turkish, and Swedish.

She is the editor of Marxism and Feminism (2015); Women, War, Violence, and Learning (2010); Women of a Non-State Nation: The Kurds (2001, second printing 2003). She co-edited with Sara Carpenter Educating from Marx: Race, Gender and Learning (2012), with Nahla Abdo, Violence in the Name of Honour: Theoretical and Political Challenges (2004), with Himani Bannerji and Judith Whitehead, Of Property and Propriety: The Role of Gender and Class in Imperialism and Nationalism (2001), and with Afsaneh Hojabri Women of Iran: A Subject bibliography and Two Decades of Iranian Women’s Studies in Exiles: A Subject Bibliography [in Persian], both published by the Iranian Women’s Studies Foundation.

She has been the guest editor of the special issue of Comparative Studies of South Asia, Africa, and the Middle East Journal, on Gender and Empire (Summer 2010) and on Dissent: The Politics and Poetics of Women’s Resistance (2012); International Journal of Lifelong Education, on Women, War and Learning; and Resources for Feminist Research, on War and Militarization.

Professor Mojab has created two research websites as an archival space for relevant resource for the research and as a tool for the dissemination of knowledge. The websites are: Marxism and Feminism: Research, Teaching, and Praxis and The Art of Resistance in the Middle East.

In recent years, Shahrzad has attempted to diversify the dissemination of her research results. Together with Shahrzad Arshadi, feminist filmmaker and photographer committed to social justice and human rights, she has produced two documentaries. Samjana: Memoirs and Resistance is based on her research about women in post-war Nepal, their role in the peace process, as well as the role of women’s NGOs in building sustainable peace. This documentary is filmed and directed by Shahrzad Arshadi. Talking Prison, Creating Art and Making Justice (2010) is a documentary based on an-art based project funded by the Ontario Arts Council and Toronto Arts Council called Words, Colour and Movement. Behind the Stained Walls (2011) is dance representation of Words, Colour and Movement project. Dancing of Change (2015) a documentary which is filmed and directed by Shahrzad Arshadi is based on Shahrzad Mojab’s decades of research and work with Kurdish women. It captures their dreams and desires for a just world, which they seek in socialism and secularism.

Her current research project is: Remembering Not to Forget is a Digital Storytelling Project telling the stories of former political prisoners-narrating state violence and telling tales of humanity, hope, and resistance. Using storytelling and digital techniques, participants will work one-on-one with artists and facilitators to tell stories, focusing on a particular time, place, space, theme, and moments of imprisonment. These stories include digital images, texts, recorded audio narrations, video clips and/or music.

In March 2022 she was amongst 151 international feminists signing Feminist Resistance Against War: A Manifesto, in solidarity with the Russian Feminist Anti-War Resistance. (Note: This manifesto was criticized by both Ukrainian feminists and members of the Feminist Anti-War Resistance themselves.)

== Awards and positions ==
Professor Mojab is the former Director of the Women and Gender Institute at the University of Toronto (2003-2008). She is also the past-President of the Canadian Association for the Studies of Adult Education.

She is the recipient of several awards, including the 2008 Distinguished Contribution to Graduate Teaching Award at the University of Toronto. In 2006 she was named Noted Scholar in the Faculty of Education, University of British Columbia. In the same year the Student Administrative Council (SAC) of the University of Toronto recognized her commitments to equity and social justice by giving her the SAC Certificate. Shahrzad was the first prize winner in the Women’s WORLD writing contest, “Women’s Voices in War Zones” in 2003 as well as being recognized as the Distinguished Visitor at the University of Alberta, Edmonton, Canada.

== Books ==
- Mojab, Shahrzad, ed. (2015). Marxism and Feminism. London: Zed Books.
- Mojab, Shahrzad (ed.). Women, War, Violence, and Learning. London: Routledge.
- Mojab, Shahrzad; Carpenter, S. (eds.). Educating from Marx: Race, Gender, and Learning. New York: Palgrave.
- Mojab, Shahrzad; Abdo, N., eds. (2004). Violence in the Name of Honour: Theoretical and Political Challenges. Istanbul: Bilgi University Press. ISBN 975-6857-98-6.
- Mojab, Shahrzad (2004). Violence in the Name of Honour: Theoretical and Political Challenges. Bilgi University Press.
- Mojab, Shahrzad; Hojabri, A, eds. (2000). Two Decades of Iranian Women's Studies in Exiles: A Subject Bibliography (in Persian). Cambridge, MA: Iranian Women's Studies Foundation.
- Mojab, Shahrzad, ed. (2001). Women of a Non-State Nation: The Kurds. Translated into Turkish by Fahriye Adsay, Sema Kiliç, and Ekin Uşaklı. Costa Mesa, California: MAZDA Publishers. ISBN 1-56859-093-8.
- Bannerji, H.; Mojab, Shahrzad; Whitehead, J., eds. (2001). Of Property and Propriety: The Role of Gender and Class in Imperialism and Nationalism. Toronto: University of Toronto Press.
- Mojab, Shahrzad; Hojabri, A, eds. (2000). Women of Iran: A Subject bibliography. Cambridge, MA: Iranian Women's Studies Foundation. ISBN 0-9701413-0-0.
