= Canadian Language Museum =

- Le Musée canadien des langues
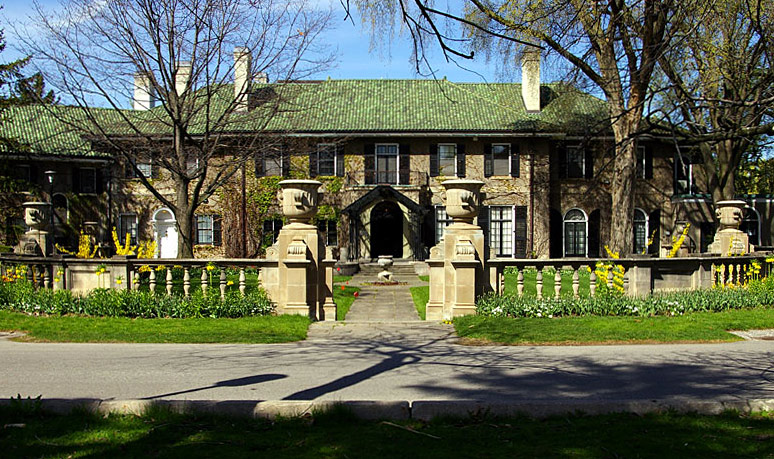
- Exterior building that houses the Canadian Language Museum
- Established: 2011
- Location: Glendon College, 2275 Bayview Avenue, Toronto, Ontario, Canada
- Coordinates: 43°43′40″N 79°22′35″W
- Type: Language museum
- Director: Elaine Gold
- Chairperson: Ian Martin
- Website: www.languagemuseum.ca

The Canadian Language Museum (French: Le Musée canadien des langues), is a language museum and registered charity located in Toronto, Ontario, Canada. Its mission is to promote an appreciation of all of the languages used in Canada, and of their role in the development of the country. The museum was established in 2011 and opened its permanent gallery space in 2016.

== History ==
The initial conceptualization of the Canadian Language Museum began in 2007 by linguist Elaine Gold with additional support from a collection of Canadian linguists and graduate students from the University of Toronto. The museum was founded in 2011 at a meeting of the Canadian Linguistic Association and a mission statement was drafted to guide the museum’s purpose and activities.

In its initial years, it operated as a ‘museum without walls’. Its exhibits travelled to venues across Canada, while not having an exhibition space of its own. In the summer of 2015, it opened an office in Toronto. The museum moved into its permanent gallery space at Glendon College, a French/English bilingual campus of York University in 2016. This transition to a permanent gallery space allowed the museum to host guest speakers, educational events, and travelling exhibitions in addition to what it internally curates.

The museum has been present at the annual meeting of the Canadian Linguistic Association each late May as part of the Congress for the Humanities and Social Sciences.

The museum also supports its mission online by operating a website, where interested parties can request exhibit loans. It also promotes language revitalization, the work of Canadian linguists, and language research more broadly through its social media accounts, and with its blog, which publishes original interviews with people from across Canada working to protect and promote the languages of Canada.

== Architecture ==
The museum is located inside Glendon Hall, the original manor house on the Edward R. Wood family estate. Situated at the eastern end of the building, the museum backs onto a formal rose garden.

== Exhibitions ==
Since its founding, the Canadian Language Museum has curated a bilingual (French/English) exhibit each year. These include travelling exhibits, temporary exhibits and web exhibits. The museum has also hosted a number of exhibits from other institutions and artists.

=== Travelling Exhibits ===
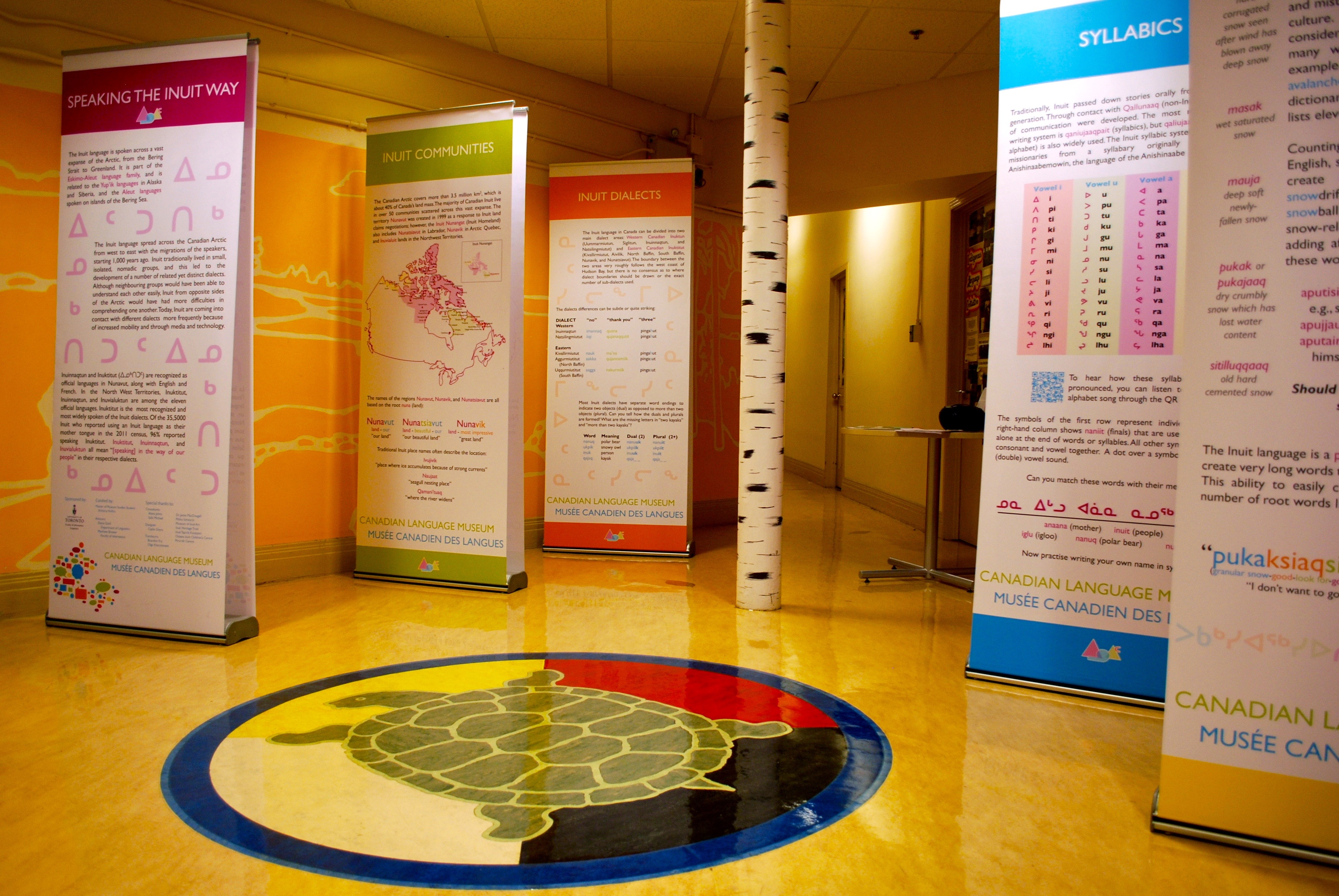
Speaking the Inuit Way on display at the Centre For Indigenous Studies, University of Toronto

Since the museum was started with no exhibition space of its own, it decided the best way to promote Canada's linguistic heritage was to curate exhibits that could travel to other venues for display. The travelling exhibits that have been produced so far include:

- Canadian English, Eh? (2012)
- Speaking the Inuit Way (2013)
- French in Canada (2014)
- Cree: The People's Language (2015)
- A Tapestry of Voices: Celebrating Canada's Languages (2016)
- Read Between the Signs: 150 Years of Language in Toronto (2017)
- Beyond Words: Dictionaries and Indigenous Languages (2019)
- Sign Languages of Canada (2021)

Each exhibit is produced with the assistance of students in the University of Toronto Masters of Museum Studies program, and is supported by academic and community stakeholders. Its exhibits are displayed on rotation at the Canadian Language Museum and they travel across Canada, from British Columbia to Newfoundland, being shown in venues such as schools, universities, community centres, libraries, airports, hospitals and small museums.

=== Temporary Exhibits ===
The museum produced Yiddish Spring, a temporary exhibit in 2019.

=== Web Exhibits ===
The museum produced two web exhibits available on its website:

- Messages from the Mosaic (2018)
- Anthem: Expressions of Canadian Identity (2020)

=== Hosted Exhibits ===
The museum has hosted art exhibits:

- Coolie Hauntings by Amar Wahab (2019)
- Legacies: Our Heritage Through Our Grandmother's Eyes by Gina Valle (2019)
- A Newfoundland Treasury of Ice and Snow by Marlene Creates (2018)
- From Smoke to Cyber Signals by Nadine St-Louis (2018)

== Promotion of Indigenous Languages ==
A primary focus of the Canadian Language Museum has been to address how colonization has played a major role in the endangerment and precarious position of Indigenous languages in Canada. The inclusion of Indigenous languages into museum programming and exhibits is central to the museum’s wider mission. The museum was founded while the Truth and Reconciliation Commission of Canada was researching the impact of residential schools on Indigenous languages and culture. The museum works with fluent speakers from their communities and linguistic experts to ethically curate its exhibits. In 2019, the museum published Indigenous Languages in Canada to commemorate the International Year of Indigenous Languages. Written by one of the museum's board members, Professor Will Oxford, the 35-page booklet is available on the museum's website and covers a wide range of topics including the unique traits, writing systems, and continued vitality of Indigenous languages in Canada.

== See also ==
- List of museums in Toronto
