= University of Toronto St. George =

University of Toronto campus in downtown Toronto, Canada

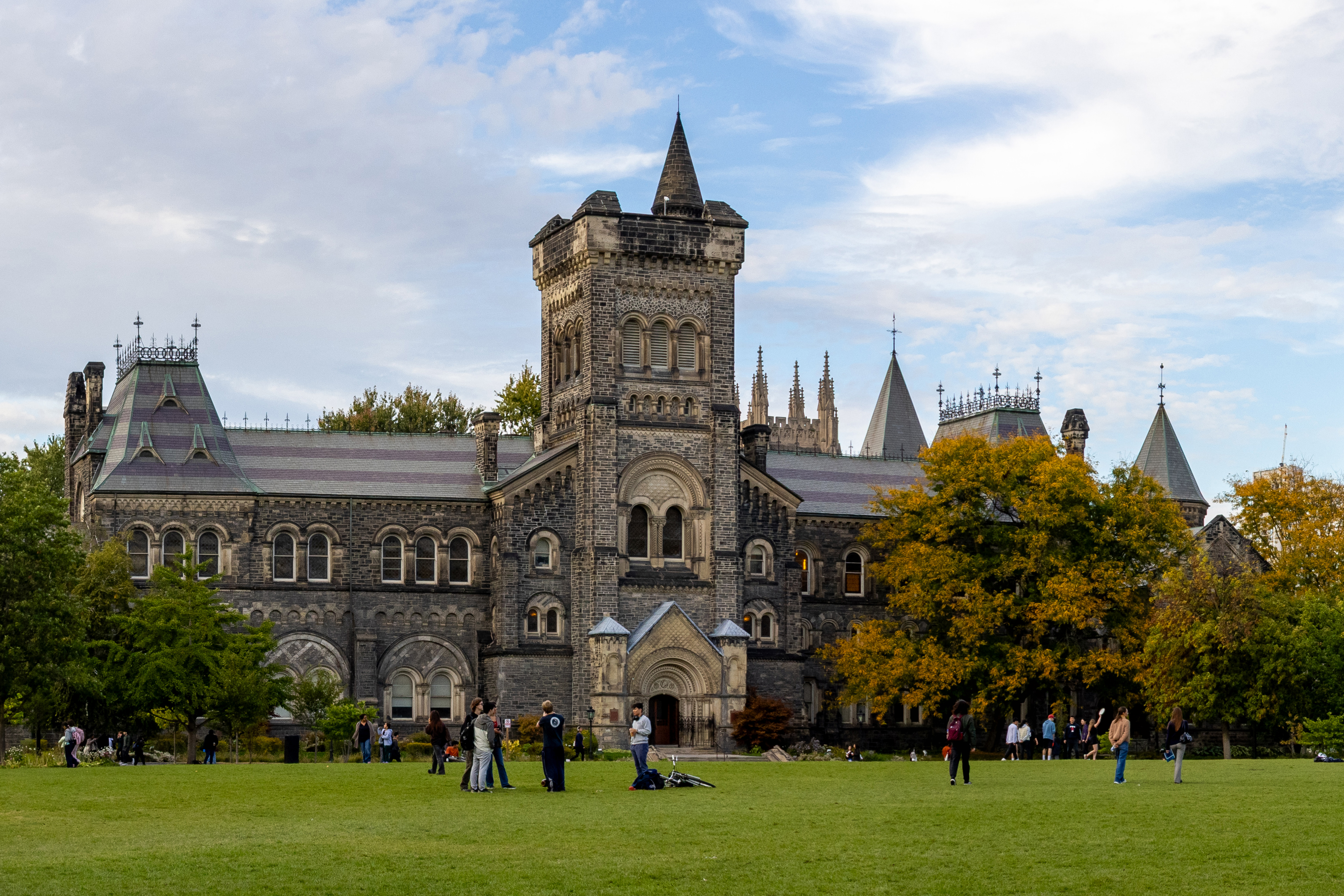
- University College, a National Historic Site of Canada located on King's College Circle
- Other name: St. George Campus
- Established: 1842; 184 years ago
- Students: 69,921 (2026)
- Undergraduates: 49,424
- Postgraduates: 20,497
- Location: Toronto, Ontario, Canada; 43°39′42″N 79°23′42″W
- Campus: 73.6 hectares (182 acres) (incl. federated colleges and Massey); Large city
- Named after: St. George Street

The University of Toronto St. George (U of T St. George, UTSG, or St. George Campus) is one of the three campuses of the University of Toronto, located in downtown Toronto, Ontario, Canada. Set on the grounds that surround Queen's Park and St. George Street, it houses the university's central administration and is the largest University of Toronto campus in terms of student enrolment.

The St. George campus is the oldest of the University of Toronto's locations, comprising historic buildings dating back to the university's founding in the 19th century. It is the location of the university's college system, comprising 11 distinct constituent and federated colleges, each with their own character, history and varying degrees of autonomy. It encompasses 73.6 hectares (182 acres) of land primarily within the University neighbourhood, including 17.7 hectares (44 acres) owned by its federated colleges and Massey College, an independent affiliated institution. The campus is home to the main offices of the president and Governing Council, and the majority of professional faculties, Varsity Blues athletic facilities, and graduate programs.

Unlike the two other University of Toronto campuses, Mississauga and Scarborough, St. George does not act as its own academic division; instead, it is made up of various divisions and colleges, the largest of which is the Faculty of Arts and Science.

== Campus history ==
Before the arrival of European settlers, the grounds on which the St. George campus stands today were inhabited by Indigenous peoples. Taddle Creek, a waterway which began near the intersection of Davenport Road and Bathurst Street, flowed through the area where Philosopher's Walk and Hart House now exist. Before it was buried during the 19th century, the creek was a gathering place for Indigenous groups such as the Huron-Wendat, the Seneca, and the Mississaugas of the Credit First Nation. The surrounding land was covered by a peace agreement between the Anishinaabe and Haudensaunee Confederacy under a Dish With One Spoon treaty. Ownership of the land was transferred from the Mississaugas to the British Crown under Treaty 13, part of the Toronto Purchase which was finalized in 1805 and remained disputed until a 2010 settlement by the Mississaugas and the Government of Canada.

The original King's College building at the present site of Queen's Park

The charter to build King's College, the institution that eventually became the University of Toronto, was obtained in 1827 and an original 128-acre property in the town of York was purchased for £3,750 the following year. The land was mostly vacant forest, with 50 acres purchased from each of Chief Justice William Dummer Powell, D'Arcy Boulton, and the Elmsley family. The college's first building began construction on the present site of Queen's Park, and the campus was formally established during a ceremony on April 23, 1842, when the cornerstone for the building was laid by governor general Sir Charles Bagot. On April 3, 1849, Robert Baldwin successfully proposed a bill to the provincial parliament to turn King's College into a secular institution with no official religious affiliation. He proposed that religious colleges such as Trinity College could affiliate with the University "with some vague status," though not as degree-granting institutions in any subject other than divinity.

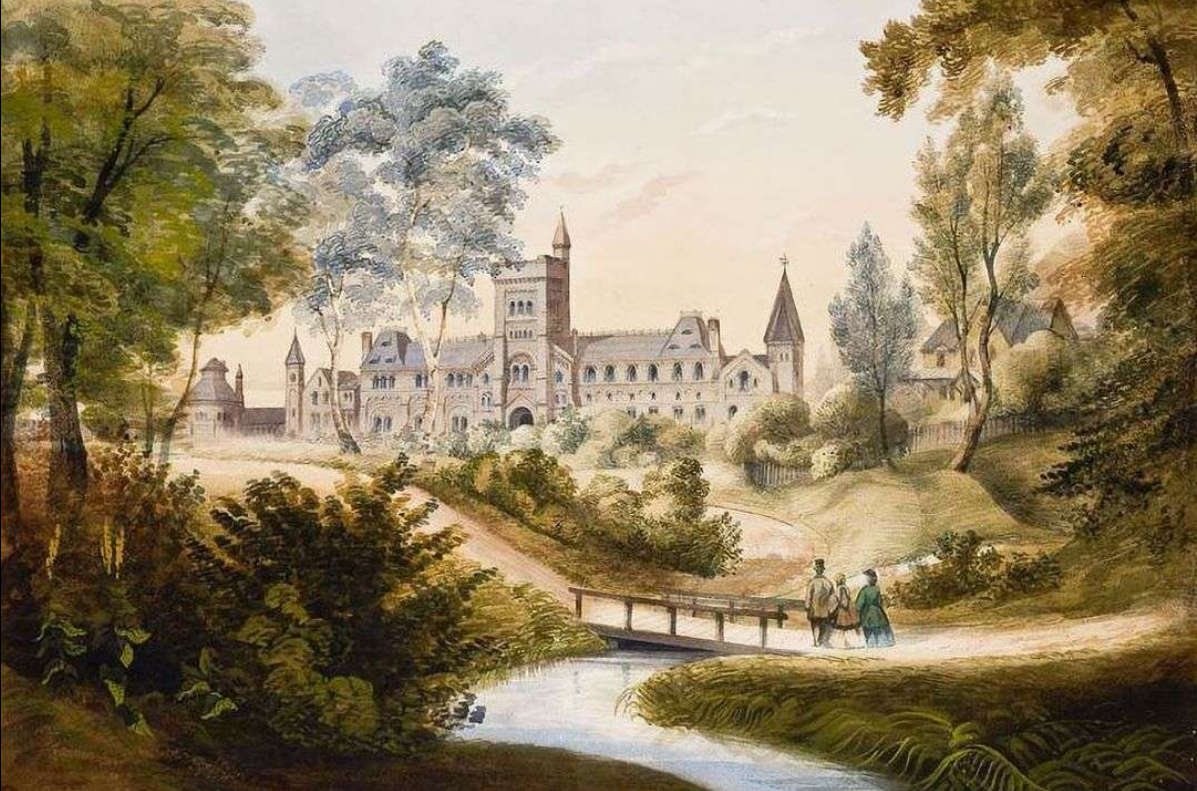
Watercolour painting of Taddle Creek in 1861. University College is in the background.

Upon secularization in 1850, King's College became the University of Toronto. The founding of University College, the university's first constituent college, marked the beginning of the St. George campus as it stands today; the college's main building opened on October 4, 1859, and the grounds have since grown to encompass a large area spanning multiple city blocks that comprise the University neighbourhood.

Queen's Park campus arose as an early retronym for the grounds during the 1960s in order to distinguish it from the University of Toronto's Scarborough and Erindale campuses. As the original campus was expanded west of St. George Street, its present name of the St. George campus entered common use. The street itself is believed to be named after French Royalist military officer Quetton St. George.

Beginning in the early 2020s, King's College Circle underwent a major transformation known as the Landmark Project. The project, completed in 2024, turned the area that was once a circular road surrounding Front Campus into a pedestrian-friendly space with new landscaping, benches, and a large parking garage underground. Also part of the initiative was the creation of a geoexchange system beneath the area, which is the largest of its kind in Canada.

== Outline ==
University of Toronto St. George Housing Museums/galleries Venues Green spaces Athletics Libraries Transit Colleges

The University of Toronto's St. George campus is roughly bounded by Bloor Street West to the north, College Street to the south, Spadina Avenue to the west, and Bay Street and Queen's Park to the east/southeast.

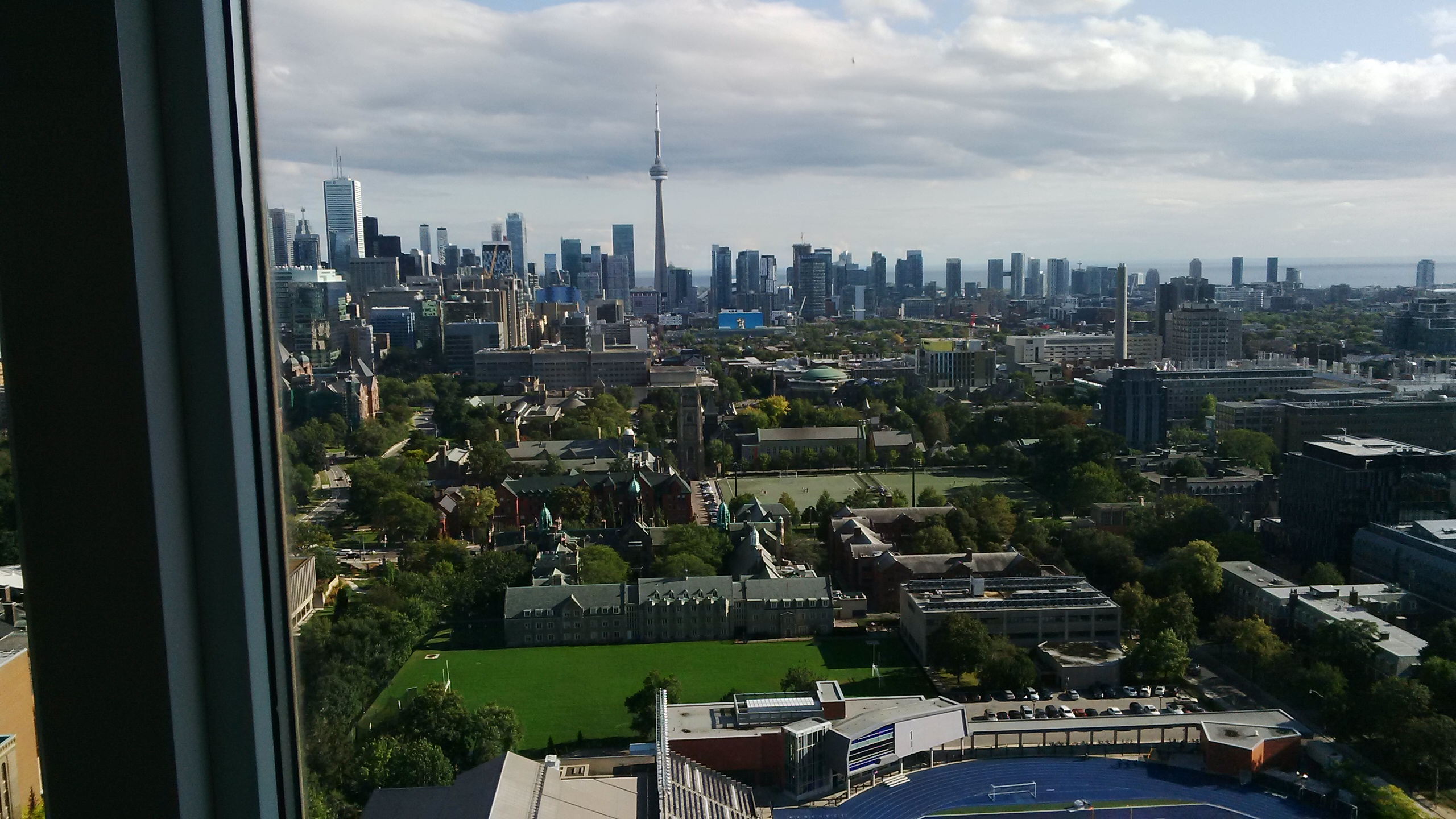
An aerial view of the St. George campus in 2017

=== Architecture styles ===
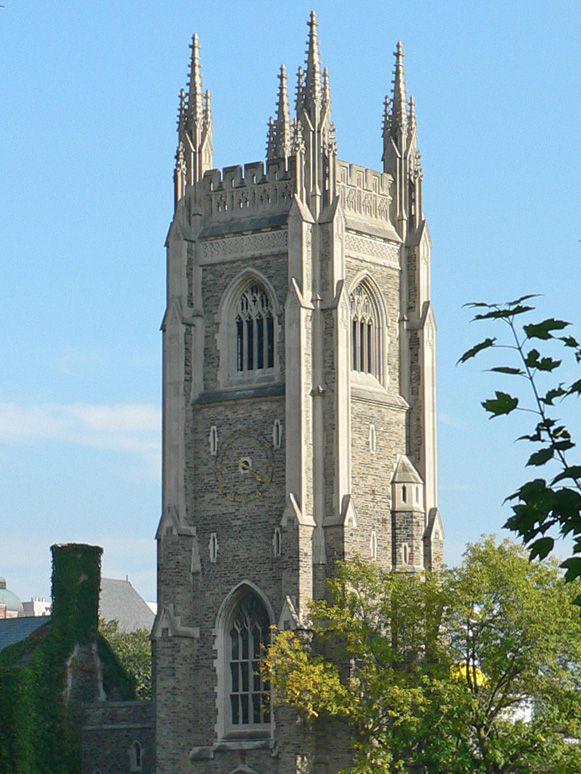
The Soldiers' Tower, a memorial to alumni fallen in the World Wars, contains a 51-bell carillon.

Architecture on the campus is epitomized by a combination of Romanesque and Gothic Revival buildings spread across the eastern and central portions of campus, most dating between 1858 and 1929. The traditional heart of the university, known as Front Campus, is near the centre of the St. George campus in an oval lawn enclosed by King's College Circle, a pedestrian street. The centrepiece of King's College Circle is the main building of University College, built in 1857 with an eclectic blend of Richardsonian Romanesque and Norman architectural elements. The dramatic effect of this blended design by architect Frederick William Cumberland drew praise from European visitors of the time: "Until I reached Toronto," remarked Lord Dufferin during his visit in 1872, "I confess I was not aware that so magnificent a specimen of architecture existed upon the American continent." The building was declared a National Historic Site of Canada in 1968. Built in 1907, Convocation Hall is recognizable for its domed roof and Ionic-pillared rotunda. Although its foremost function is hosting the annual convocation ceremonies, the building is a venue for academic and social events throughout the year. The sandstone buildings of Knox College epitomizes the North American collegiate Gothic design, with its characteristic cloisters surrounding a secluded courtyard.

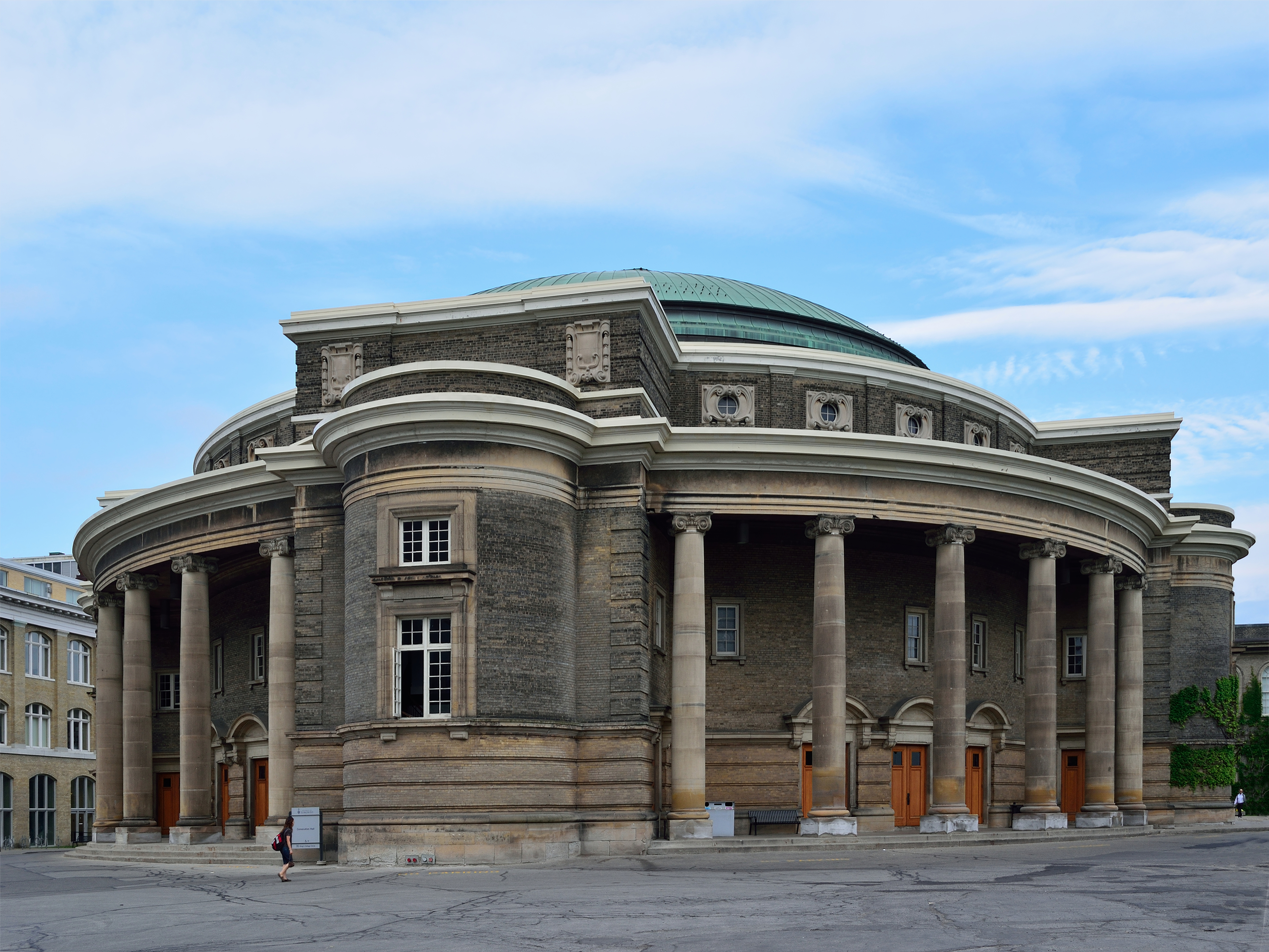
The neoclassical Convocation Hall is characterized by its domed roof and Ionic-pillared rotunda.

A lawn at the northeast is anchored by Hart House, a Gothic-revival student centre complex. Among its many common rooms, the building's Great Hall is noted for large stained-glass windows and a long quotation from John Milton's Areopagitica inscribed around the walls. The adjacent Soldiers' Tower stands 143 feet (44 m) tall as the most prominent structure in the vicinity, its stone arches etched with the names of university members lost to the battlefields of the two World Wars. The tower houses a 51-bell carillon played on special occasions such as Remembrance Day and convocation. North of University College, the main building of Trinity College displays Jacobethan Tudor architecture, while its chapel was built in the Perpendicular Gothic style of Giles Gilbert Scott. The chapel features exterior walls of sandstone and interiors of Indiana Limestone and was built by Italian stonemasons using ancient building methods. Philosopher's Walk is a scenic footpath that follows a meandering, wooded ravine, the buried Taddle Creek, linking with Trinity College, Varsity Arena and the Henry N.R. Jackman Faculty of Law. Victoria College is on the eastern side of Queen's Park, centred on a Romanesque main building made of contrasting red sandstone and grey limestone.

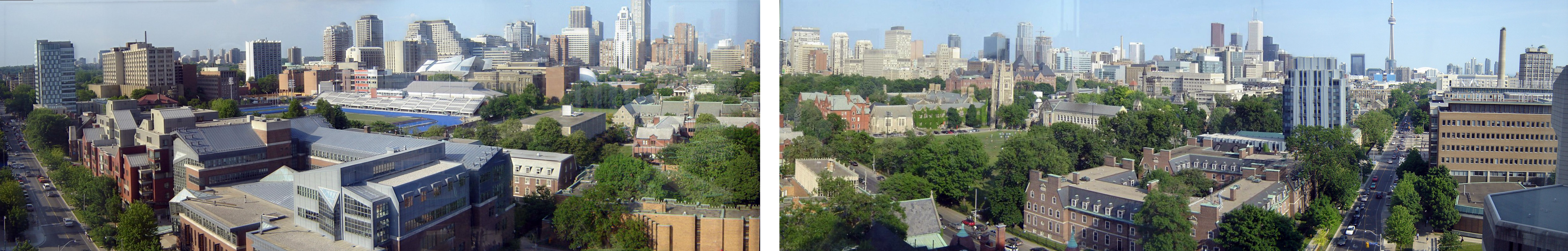
The north-central portion of the St. George campus as seen from Robarts Library, with the skyline of downtown Toronto in the background.

Developed after the Second World War, the section of the campus west of St. George Street consists mainly of modernist and internationalist structures that house laboratories and faculty offices. The most significant example of Brutalist architecture is the massive Robarts Library complex, built in 1972 and opened a year later in 1973. It features raised podia, extensive use of triangular geometric designs and a towering 14-storey concrete structure that cantilevers above a field of open space and mature trees. Sidney Smith Hall is the home to the Faculty of Arts and Science, as well as a few departments within the faculty. The Leslie L. Dan Pharmacy Building, completed in 2006, exhibits the high-tech architectural style of glass and steel by British architect Norman Foster.

=== Central area ===
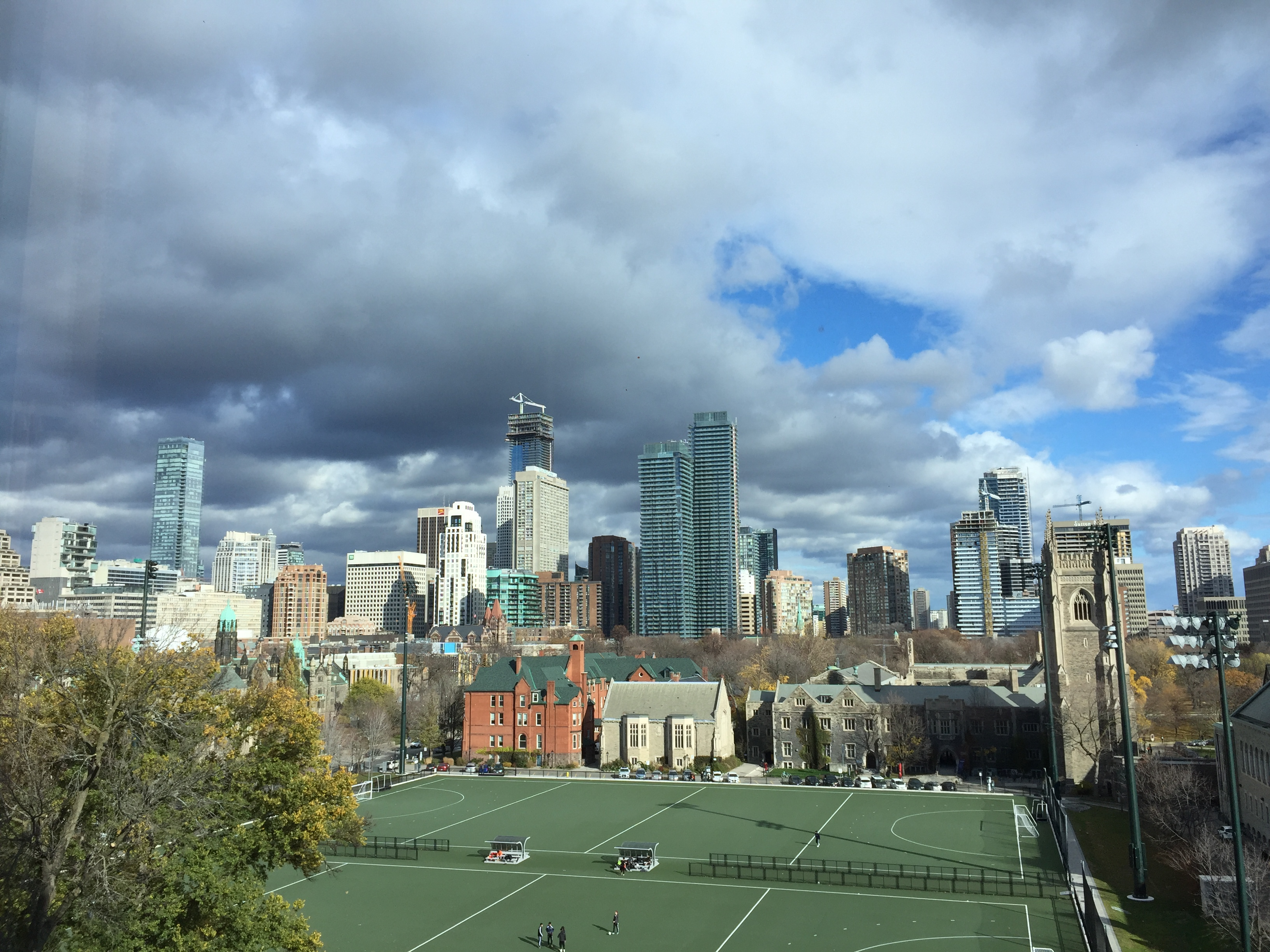
The Back Campus fields in front of Wycliffe College and Hart House.

The St. George campus's central area is bounded by St. George Street to the west, Hoskin Avenue to the north, Queen's Park Crescent West to the east and College Street to the south.

Hart House, located just northeast of King's College Circle, is the University of Toronto's historical student activity centre built in 1919. It is named after Hart Massey. It hosts a theatre, library, the Arbor Room restaurant, and various recreational spaces. The Justina M. Barnicke Gallery of the Art Museum at the University of Toronto is situated within Hart House, and hosts the second largest gallery space for visual art and programming in Toronto after the Art Gallery of Ontario.

Situated next Hart House is the Soldiers' Tower, a carillon bell tower constructed in 1924 as a memorial for students lost during the World Wars.

The Back Campus Fields are two outdoor synthetic turf fields behind University College used for recreational sport.

The south end of the central area houses the main buildings of the Temerty Faculty of Medicine and the Faculty of Applied Science and Engineering.

==== Front Campus ====
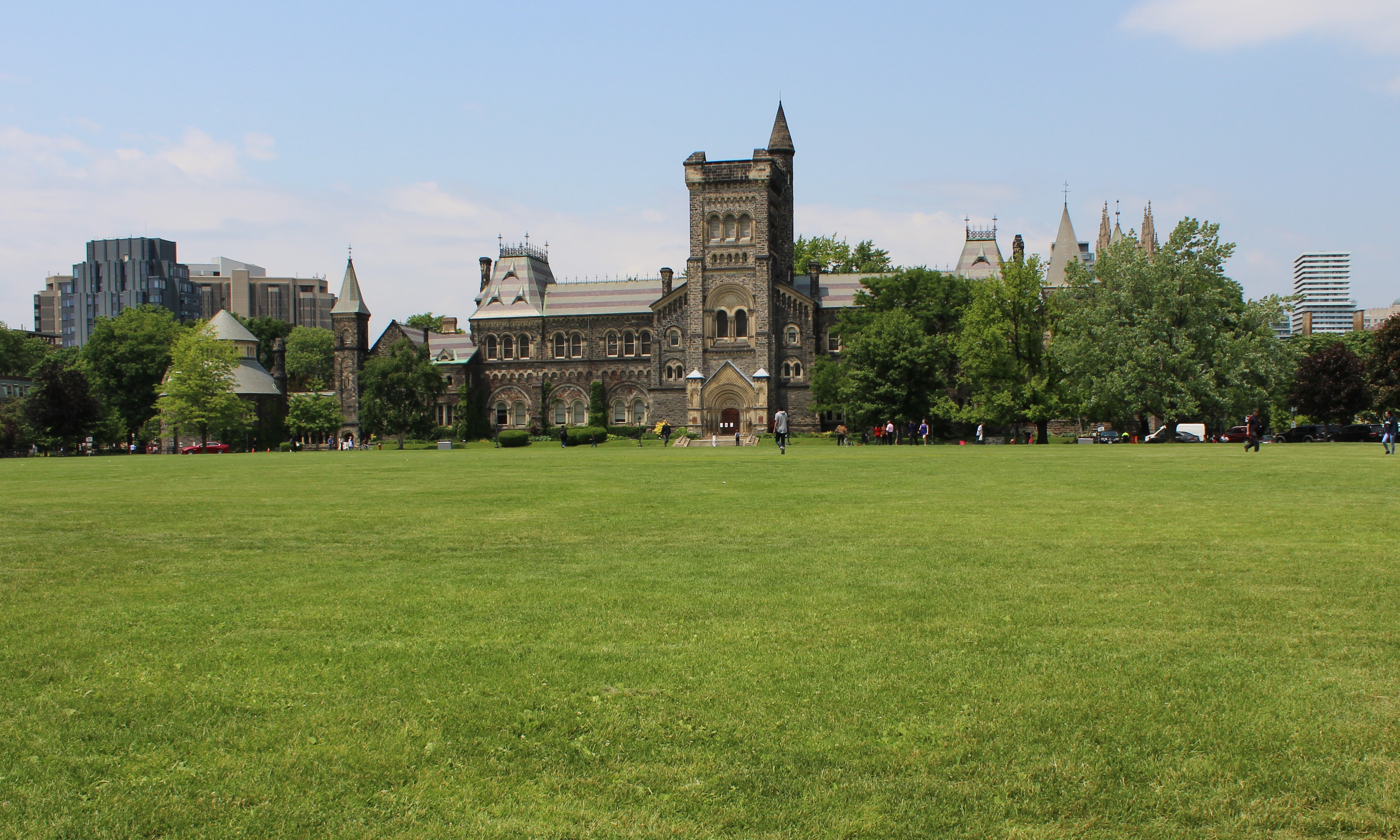
The green space of Front Campus in front of University College

Front Campus is a large open square and green space in the historic centre of the St. George campus. The area is outlined by King's College Circle, a pedestrian street lined with gardens and benches. Surrounding Front Campus along King's College Circle is (clockwise) the main building of University College, the Gerstein Science Information Centre, the Medical Sciences Building, Convocation Hall, Simcoe Hall, and Knox College.

=== Western portion ===
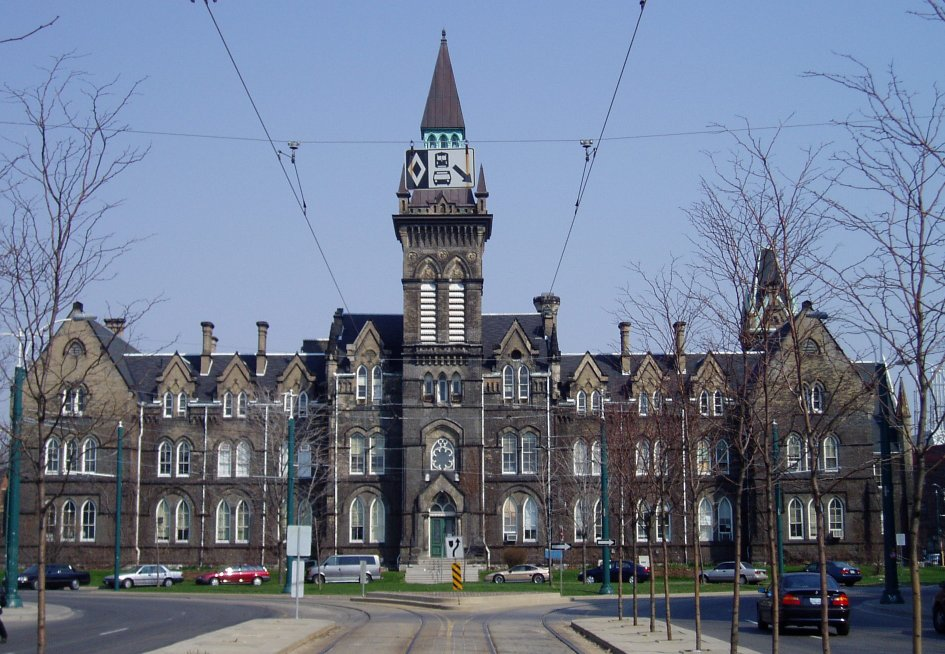
The Daniels Building, home to the Daniels Faculty

The western portion of the campus includes everything west of St. George Street, the campus's namesake. Major faculties based in this area include the Faculty of Arts and Science, Rotman School of Management, and the John H. Daniels Faculty of Architecture, Landscape, and Design. Colleges in this area, bounded by Spadina Avenue to the west and College Street to the south, include New College.

Robarts Library is the largest library in the University of Toronto Libraries system and the largest academic library building in Canada. It is located along St. George Street.

Sidney Smith Hall is the central building of the Faculty of Arts and Science, the largest division of the university, which provides the majority of undergraduate education at the St. George campus.

=== Northern portion ===
This area includes colleges such as Trinity College, Woodsworth College, and Innis College, as well as the Munk School of Global Affairs and Public Policy, Ontario Institute for Studies in Education (OISE), and Factor Inwentash School of Social Work.

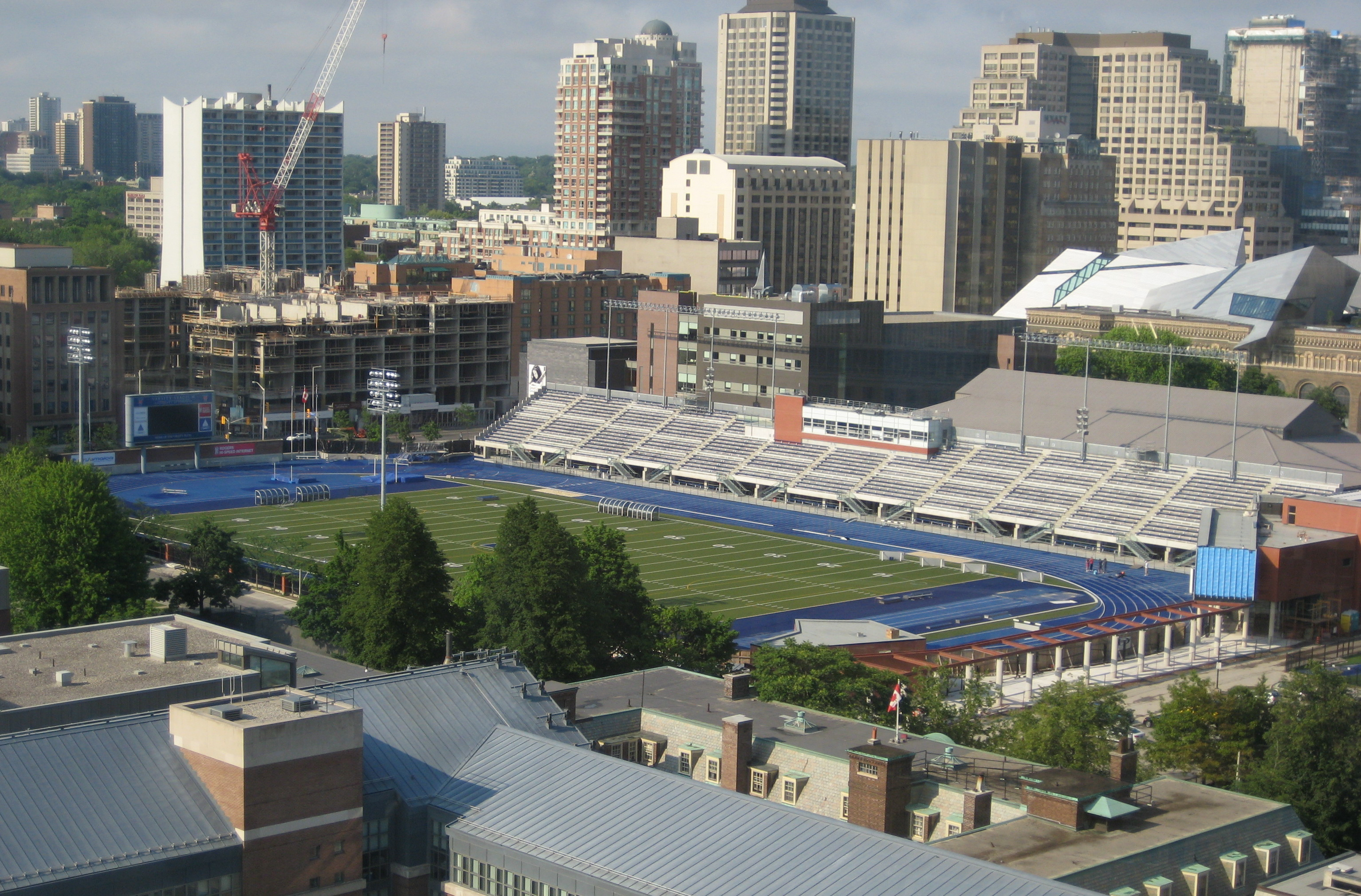
Varsity Stadium of the Varsity Centre & Arena

Varsity Centre and Area is a sports complex comprising Varsity Stadium, Varsity Arena, and the Varsity Pavilion. It is the practice and training facility for various Varsity Blues teams and a venue for intercollegiate sports.

=== Eastern portion ===
The eastern portion extends across Queen's Park and is roughly outlined by Bloor Street to the north, Bay Street to the east, and Wellesley Street to the South. It includes the Henry N.R. Jackman Faculty of Law, Victoria College, Emmanuel College, and the Toronto School of Theology.

Queen's Park is a large urban park within the campus grounds, surrounded by Queen's Park Crescent. It is the location of the Ontario Legislative Building, which is not part of the campus area. However, the land was acquired by the Government of Ontario in a 999-year "peppercorn" lease from the University of Toronto in 1859.

=== Southern portion ===
The southern portion of campus has seen notable development more recently, including the Schwartz Reisman Innovation Campus. Running along University Avenue, the campus extends southwards to Dundas Street with a few buildings, including the Dentistry Building of the Faculty of Dentistry and Chestnut Residence building in Little Japan a few blocks west of Toronto Metropolitan University (TMU).

== Colleges ==
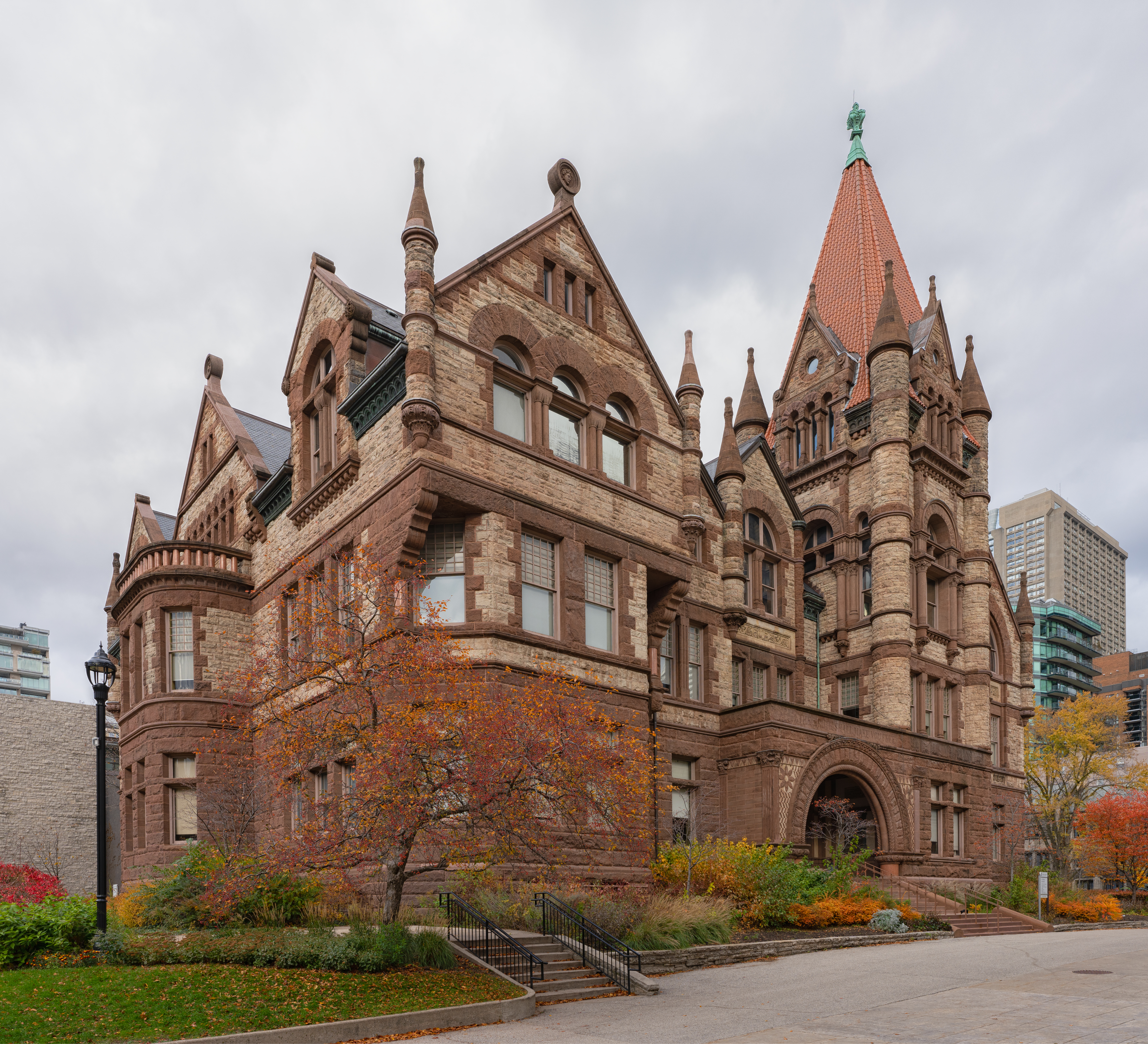
Old Vic, the main building of Victoria College

All of the colleges in the University of Toronto's collegiate system are located on the St. George campus. The model was made to resemble those of the University of Oxford and University of Cambridge, and each hold some degree of autonomy over admissions and other academic and financial affairs. They include housing and social duties of typical residential colleges.

- Innis College
- Knox College
- Massey College
- New College
- Regis College
- St. Michael's College
- Trinity College
- University College
- Victoria College
- Woodsworth College
- Wycliffe College

== Student life ==
=== Athletics ===
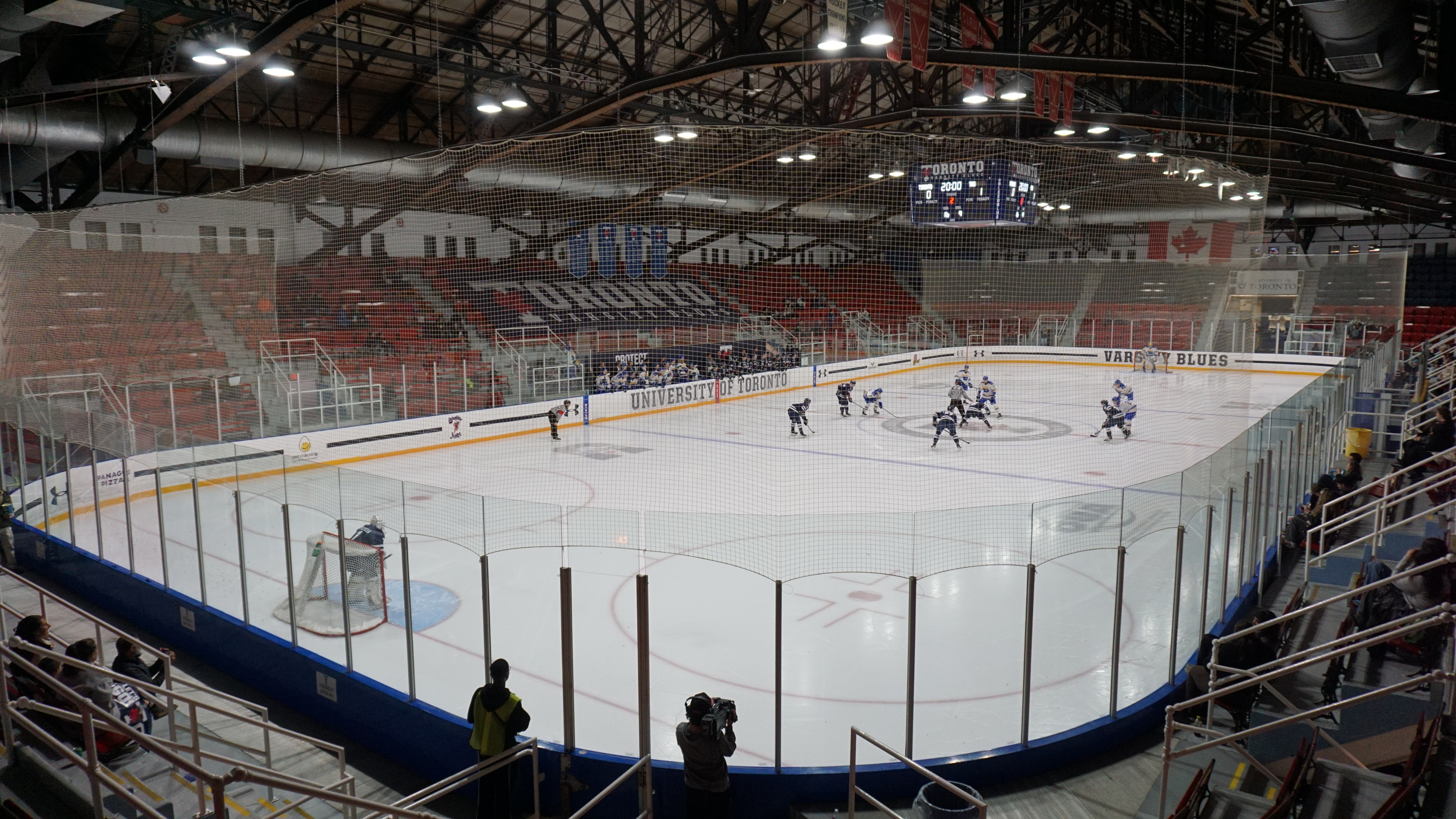
Interior of Varsity Arena in 2025

Most venues of the Toronto Varsity Blues, the University of Toronto's intercollegiate sports teams, are located on the campus. Varsity Stadium is a stadium which hosts football and soccer games. Its current structure was built in 1911, however its field opened in 1898, making it the oldest sports stadium in Toronto. Varsity Arena is used for Varsity Blues ice hockey, and the Goldring Centre for High Performance Sport is the main venue for basketball and volleyball.

The first documented North American (gridiron) football game was played on the St. George campus at University College on November 9, 1861.

In the University of Toronto Tri-Campus League, an intramural sports tournament in which students from each of the university's three campuses compete in various sports, the St. George campus is represented by two teams dubbed UTSG Red and UTSG Blue. Players for both St. George teams are selected through tryouts.

=== Transportation ===
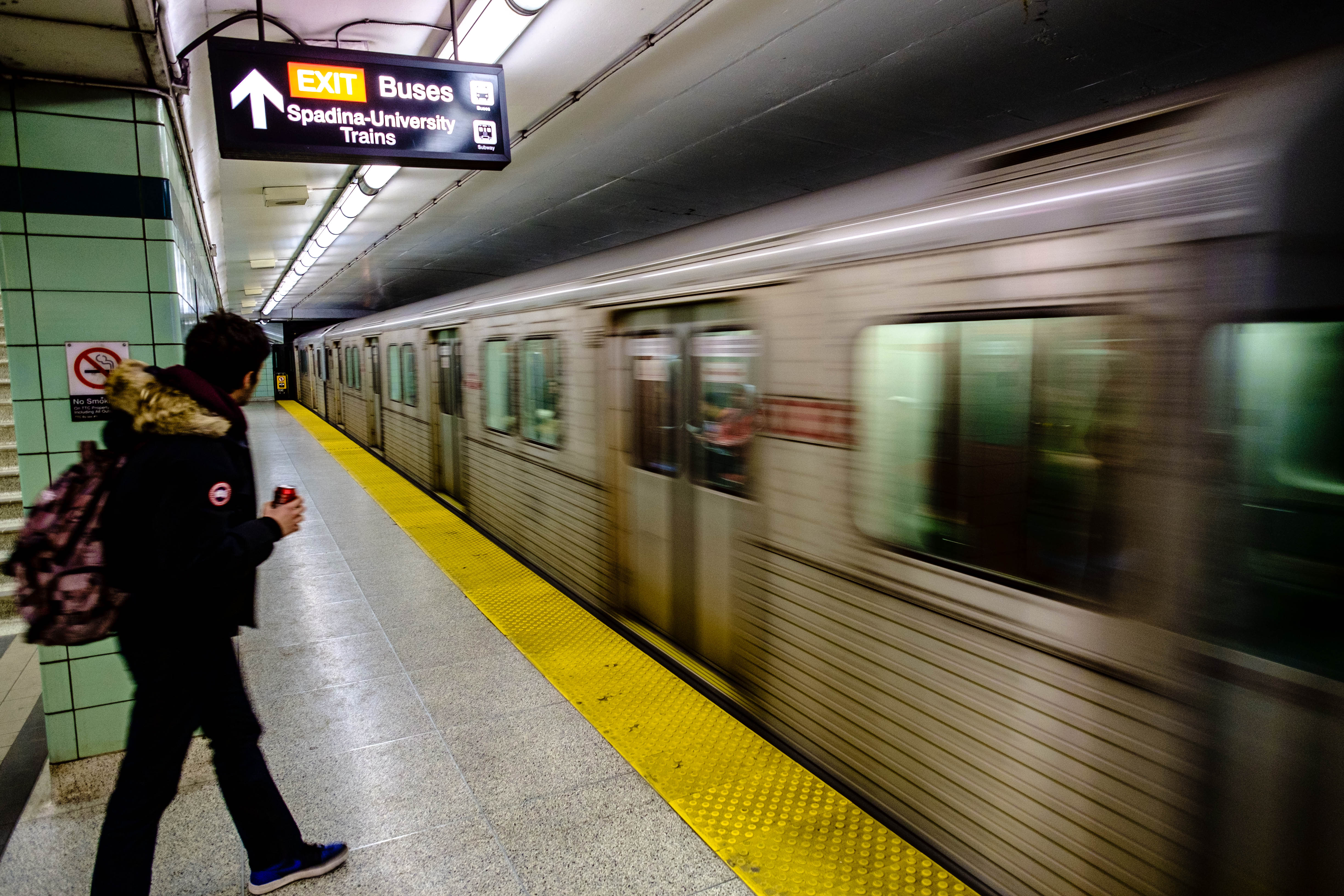
St. George station on Line 1 and Line 2 of the Toronto subway.

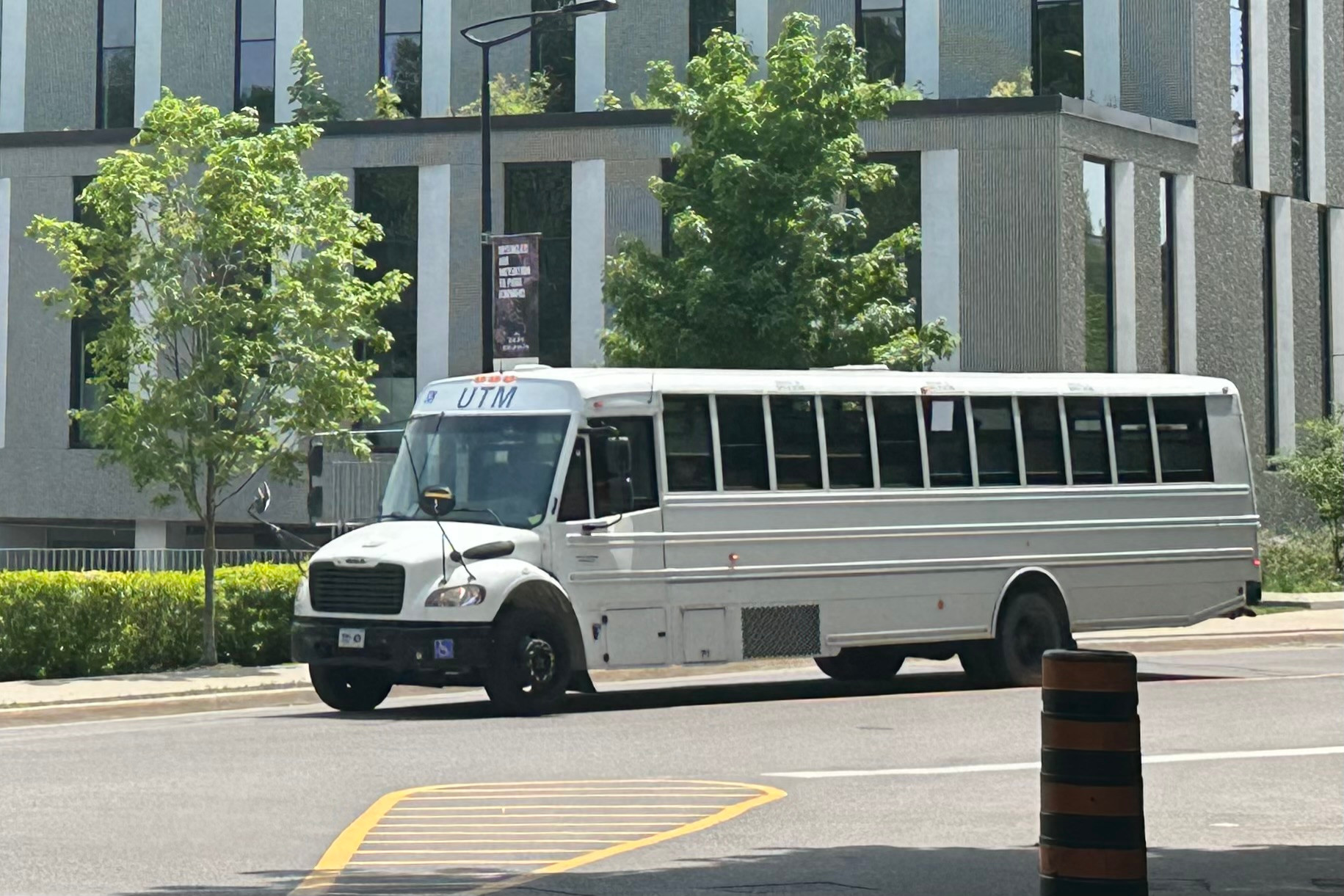
A UTM Shuttle Bus on the Mississauga campus

The St. George campus's location in downtown Toronto makes it accessible by various forms of transportation. Several stations of the Toronto subway are nearby, including St. George, Museum, and Queen's Park on Line 1 Yonge–University. Spadina station is also close by, and serves as an interchange with Line 2 Bloor–Danforth alongside St. George station. The 510 Spadina streetcar route runs along its namesake avenue bordering the campus to the west, and the 506 Carlton streetcar along College Street at the campus's southern boundary.

St. George station is the second-busiest in the Toronto subway system, serving a combined total of 209,994 passengers per day in 2023–2024 and located near the north-central portion of the campus. It has a non-staffed entrance in the Ontario Institute for Studies in Education (OISE) building.

Parking on the campus is limited. There is an underground parking garage located at the Rotman School of Management building on St. George Street and the Landmark Garage underneath King's College Circle, the latter of which was completed in 2024 and maintains 48 electric vehicle charging stations.

The campus is also served by the UTM Shuttle Bus, which runs all week between Wetmore Hall and the Instructional Centre at the University of Toronto Mississauga (UTM).

=== Students' unions ===
Full-time undergraduate students at the St. George campus are represented by the University of Toronto Students' Union (UTSU), which is also the largest student union at the university. Student representative bodies also exist at the various colleges, academic faculties and departments. The Association of Part-time Undergraduate Students (APUS) and the University of Toronto Graduate Students' Union (UTGSU) are tri-campus bodies which represent part-time undergraduates and postgraduate students, respectively.

=== Demographics ===
Student Demographics (UTSG, 2024–25)
	Undergraduate	Graduate
Men	43.6%	40.1%
Women	53.5%	58.8%
Other gender or unreported	2.9%	1.2%
Canadian student	70.1%	73.0%
International student	29.9%	27.0%

St. George has the largest number of students of the three University of Toronto campuses, with approximately double that of the Mississauga and Scarborough campuses combined. It also attracts the most graduate students, with 94 per cent of the university's postgraduates in the 2024–2025 academic year. Approximately 29.0 per cent of its students are international, a larger proportion than the 25.7 per cent at the Mississauga campus and slightly less than the 30.7 at the Scarborough campus.

== In popular culture ==
The University of Toronto's St. George campus has been used as a filming location for many movies, television series and music videos, often standing in for other universities. Films shot on the campus include Good Will Hunting (1997), in which it stood in for Harvard University and MIT, and Mean Girls (2004), which was filmed in Convocation Hall. The Incredible Hulk (2008) was filmed at Knox College while RoboCop (2014) was shot in the Donnelly Centre and Convocation Hall. In Harold & Kumar Go to White Castle (2004), St. George stood in for Princeton University. Other movies filmed at the campus include Resident Evil: Afterlife (2010), Cocktail (1988), Urban Legend (1998), The Prince and Me (2004), Total Recall (2012), Tommy Boy (1995) and The Freshman (1990). The 1965 student production Winter Kept Us Warm is set on the St. George campus and was the first feature film to be shot at the University of Toronto. It is considered English Canada's first queer film and the first English-language Canadian film shown at the Cannes Film Festival.

Television series filmed at the St. George campus include Overcompensating (2025– ), which featured Victoria College, and Gen V (2023–2025), a spin-off of The Boys (2019–2026), which filmed at Victoria and Massey colleges, although its production mainly took place on the Mississauga campus.

The music video for "Head over Heels" by Tears for Fears was filmed at the Emmanuel College Library in 1985.

== See also ==
- University of Toronto Campus Safety
- Education in Toronto
- History of Toronto
