= University of Toronto Archives and Records Management Services =

Library archive in Ontario, Canada

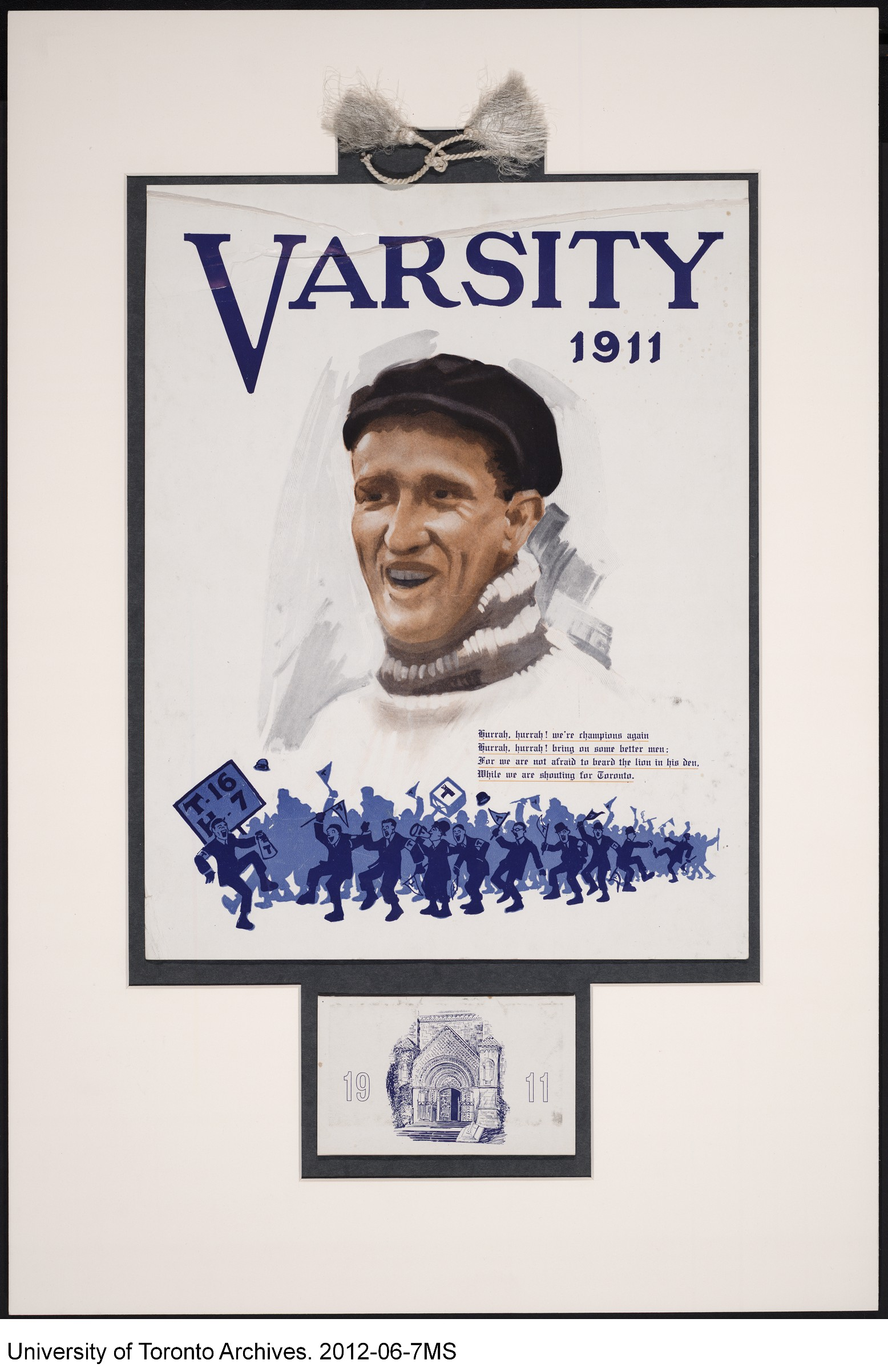
- A calendar digitized by the University of Toronto Archives featuring Hugh Gall
- Location: Thomas Fisher Rare Book Library; 120 St. George Street, Toronto, Ontario, Canada
- Established: 1965 (61 years ago)
- Branch of: University of Toronto Libraries

Collection
- Items collected: University records, private records of individuals and groups associated with the U of T, University publications and historical theses

Other information
- Public transit access: St. George, Spadina
- Website: utarms.library.utoronto.ca

The University of Toronto Archives and Records Management Services (UTARMS) is an archives and records management unit at the University of Toronto. Established in 1965, the archives preserves and guides the use of university records and publications, personal records of university-affiliated individuals and groups, and historical theses.

The University of Toronto Archives is located in Thomas Fisher Rare Book Library. Its research support services are open to the public. In 2025, the University Archives housed over 14 kilometres of paper records and over 36 terabytes of digital records. Some example holdings are those of Harold Innis, Rodney Bobiwash, Ursula Franklin, the University of Toronto Press, Science for Peace, the SLOWPOKE reactor facility, and presidential advisory committees.

== Organisation ==
UTARMS is the centralized archives and records management unit at the University of Toronto. It works alongside the university's many other archives to document the university and university life.

The University of Toronto Archives preserves "University records of permanent value and the private records of individuals and organizations associated with the University". Based on the university's collegiate system, its mandate excludes the records of the federated universities (St. Michael's, Trinity and Victoria) and the theological colleges (Knox, Wycliffe, and Emmanuel).

For the university community and the general public, the archives provides research support to help them find available archival sources. It also provides paper and digital records management support to units across the university.

== History ==
In the early 1960s, older Canadian universities began to appoint archivists to care for their accumulating records. At the University of Toronto, the University Archives was created in response to Robert H. Blackburn's proposal to appraise and preserve records housed in what is now Gerstein Science Information Centre. It opened in January 1965 as a unit within the Department of Rare Books and Special Collections with Helen Miles as University Archivist. In 1967, the archives and its home department moved to 45 Charles Street East.

In its first decade, the archives expanded its collection of both administrative and non-administrative university records as well as the personal records of faculty and staff. In 1972, it moved into the Robarts Library building complex to form part of the Thomas Fisher Rare Book Library. At the end of 1972, the institution's volume of material stood at some 1,500 metres.

The archives continued to grow through the 1980s and the 1990s through budgetary challenges and technological changes. In May 1989, the University Archives launched a records management program.

In 2015, the University Archives housed about 11,400 metres of material and managed about eight times as much material as it did in 1972. It increasingly stored its collections offsite at the University of Toronto Libraries' Downsview location and was adapting to greater demand for audiovisual material. It also worked to get its holdings into the public domain through scanning.

In 2025, UTARMS housed over 14 kilometres of records, 3.1 terabytes of web archives and 33.7 terabytes of digitized archives.

== Collections ==
The archives's holdings include:

- 11,000+ metres of paper records
- 200,000+ photographs and negatives
- 100+ oral histories recording the personal memories of senior administrative staff, faculty, and students
- thousands of architectural plans and drawings of university buildings
- digitized 57,000+ pages of print material, including yearbooks, president’s reports and other university publications
- the original university charter from 1827
- masters theses from 1897-1989 and doctoral theses from 1900-1985
- the papers of influential members of the university, including Harold Innis, Ursula Franklin, C.B. Macpherson, C.P. Stacey, and Helen Hogg

UTARMS provides a range of digital tools to help users find what they need. (Note: The vast majority of archival material is maintained offline.) This includes digital access to descriptions of holdings through Discover Archives, a central search portal for archival material held by the University of Toronto and its federated colleges.
