= Papyrus Oxyrhynchus 265 =

Greek marriage contract from 1st century CE

Papyrus Oxyrhynchus 265 (P. Oxy. 265 or P. Oxy. II 265) is a fragment of a Marriage Contract, in Greek. It was discovered in Oxyrhynchus. The manuscript was written on papyrus in the form of a sheet. It is dated to 81–96. Currently, it is housed in the Thomas Fisher Rare Book Library of the University of Toronto in Toronto, Canada.

== Description ==
The document was written by Sarapius. It is signed by Dionysios.

The measurements of the fragment are 270 by 138 mm. The document is much mutilated.

It was discovered by Grenfell and Hunt in 1897 in Oxyrhynchus. The text was published by Grenfell and Hunt in 1899.

== See also ==
- Oxyrhynchus Papyri
