= Asian Library =

Asian library or East Asian library may refer to:

- East Asian Library and the Gest Collection, Princeton University collection of materials in Chinese, Japanese, and Korean languages
- C.V. Starr East Asian Library, a library at Columbia University for the study of East Asia
- Cheng Yu Tung East Asian Library, a library for East Asian Studies at the University of Toronto
- Digital South Asia Library, a collaboration to provide access to materials on South Asian topics
- University of British Columbia Library system's Asian Library
- University of Michigan Library system's Asian Library
- Leiden University Library system's East Asian Library
- University of Minnesota Libraries system's East Asian Library
- Washington University Libraries system's East Asian Library
- UCLA Library system's Richard C. Rudolph East Asian Library
- Harvard–Yenching Library, a library of East Asia-related collections at Harvard University
