= Robert Kenny =

Robert Kenny may refer to:

- Robert W. Kenny (1901–1976), Attorney General of California
- Robert S. Kenny (1905–1993), member of the Communist Party of Canada and collector
