= Sigmund Samuel =

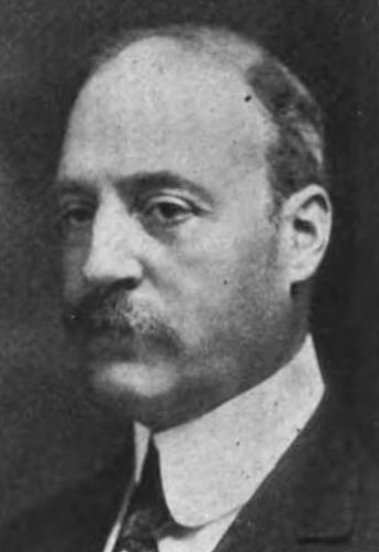
- Born: October 24, 1868; Toronto, Ontario
- Died: April 29, 1962 (aged 93); Toronto, Ontario
- Occupation: Businessman
- Spouse: Leah May Mandelson (m. 1898)
- Children: 4

Sigmund Samuel (October 24, 1868 – April 29, 1962) was a Canadian businessman and philanthropist. He was the son of industrialist Lewis Samuel (1827–1887), and he continued to run his father's steel business.

== Life and career ==
Samuel was born in 1868 to Lewis and Kate Samuel in Toronto, Ontario. In 1856, his father had co-founded M & L Samuel Company in Toronto, which later grew to become an importer and distributor of steel products in Canada (now known as Samuel, Son & Co., with its headquarters in Oakville, Ontario). Samuel became involved in the business following the death of his father in 1887. Samuel was an important member of the Holy Blossom Congregation in Toronto, which his father had been a member of. He married Leah May Mandelson, who bore several children (Kathleen Samuel b. 1899, Lewis Samuel II b. 1900, Norman Mandelson Samuel b. 1902, and Florence May Samuel b. 1907).

Later in life, Samuel made significant donations to cultural (the Royal Ontario Museum's Sigmund Samuel Building) and educational (the University of Toronto's Sigmund Samuel Library) institutions in Toronto.

Samuel died in Toronto on April 29, 1962. His grandson, Ernest L. Samuel, took over the family business at that point. He served as CEO of Samuel, Son & Co. and as CEO of Samuel Manu-Tech Inc. for many years. He also established a successful Thoroughbred horse racing stable, named Sam-Son Farm. Upon the death of Ernest L. Samuel in 2000, his only son (Mark Samuel) took over the running of the family business.
