= Samuel, Son & Co. =

Canadian multinational company

Samuel, Son & Co., Limited

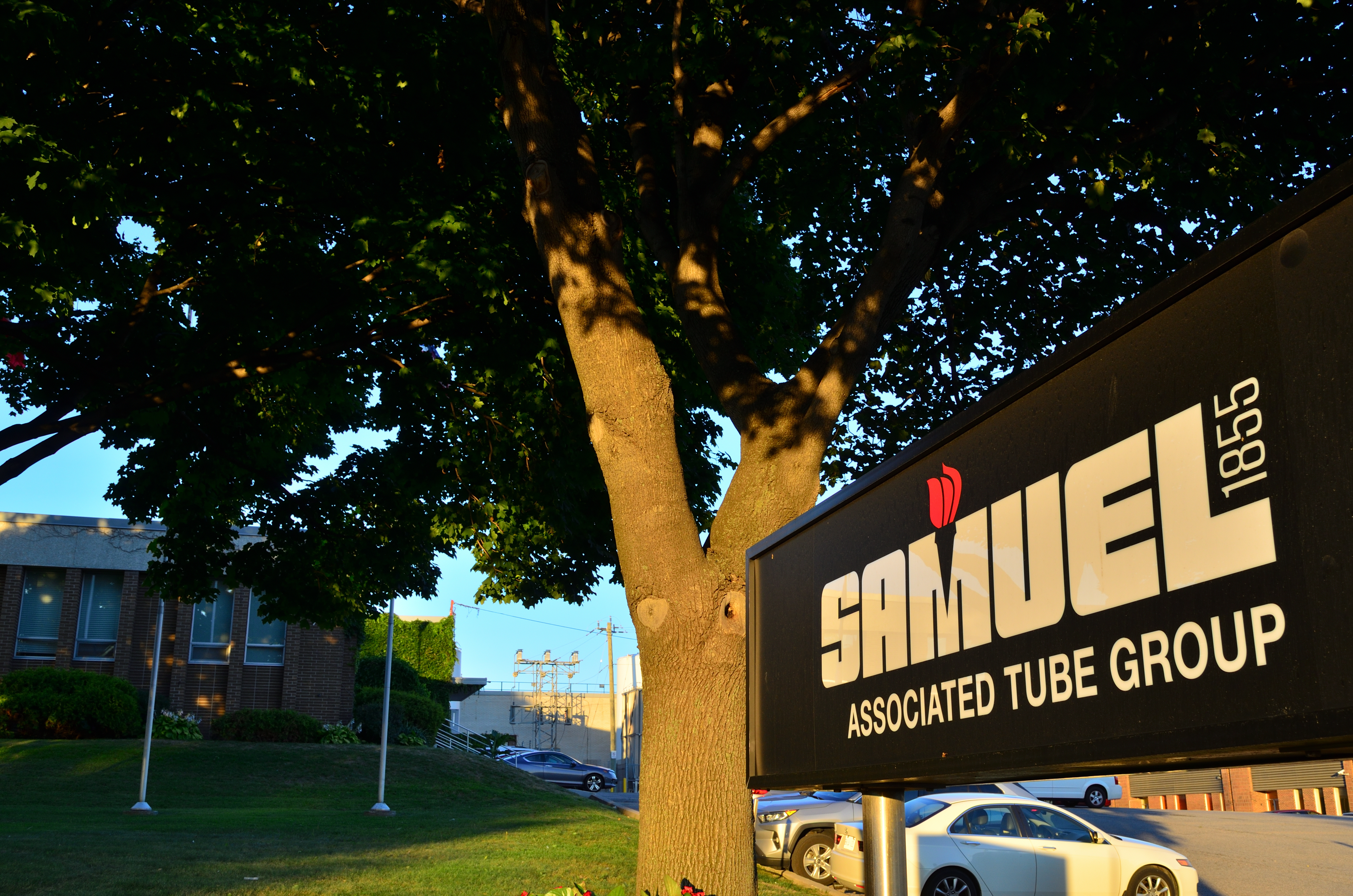
- Samuel Associated Tube Group in Markham
- Formerly: M & L Samuel (1855–1931)
- Type: Private
- Industry: Metals, metalworking
- Founded: 1855; 171 years ago Toronto, Canada West
- Founders: Mark Samuel; Lewis Samuel
- Headquarters: 1900 Ironoak Way; Oakville, Ontario, Canada
- Number of locations: 88 (2020)
- Area served: Australia, Canada, Mexico, and the United States
- Key people: Colin Osborne (President and CEO)
- Owner: Samuel family
- Number of employees: 5,200 (2018)
- Website: samuel.com

Samuel, Son & Co. is a Canadian multinational company specializing in metal processing, distribution, and industrial products. As of 2018, the company has over 5,200 employees and is one of the largest processors and distributors of metal products in North America.

== History ==
The business was originally founded by brothers Mark and Lewis Samuel in 1855 as "M & L Samuel" in downtown Toronto. The company operated out of the Coffin Block Building until 1881. A larger location was built in 1907 at King Street and Spadina Avenue in Toronto's Garment District (now the Entertainment District).

In 1931, ownership of the company was transferred to Sigmund Samuel, and it was renamed as Samuel, Son & Co. In 1956, the company expanded into the Montreal area with the opening of "Samuel & Fils", its first location outside of Toronto. In 1960, Samuel moved its headquarters to neighbouring Mississauga as the construction of the Gardiner Expressway provided growth west of Toronto.

On April 29, 1962, Sigmund Samuel died, leaving his grandson Ernest L. Samuel as his successor. In 1963, the "Samuel Strapping Systems" division was founded, which manufactures a range of packaging and strapping products. The following year, Samuel founded "Kim-Tam Logistics" as a solution to handle the growing demands of its metal processing business.

== Acquisitions ==
In 1972, Bothwell Steel and Nelson Steel were both acquired by Samuel.

Around 1991, Samuel purchased the Ontario portion of Wilkinson Steel, and Wilkinson acquired the western divisions of Samuel. Under agreement of neither company operating in each other's respective locations. Upon the agreements end, Samuel returned to Western Canada.

On March 28, 2013, it was announced that Wilkinson Steel would be acquired by Samuel. The merger more than doubled the company's presence in the Western Canadian market. The deal was finalized in May 2013.

On December 13, 2013, Evraz sold their coil processing facility in Surrey, British Columbia to Samuel.

On November 15, 2017, Samuel announced the acquisition of Main Steel of Elk Grove Village, Illinois, with operations in four U.S. states.

On May 4, 2018, it was announced that Samuel would acquire CAID Industries Inc. of Tucson, Arizona.

On July 12, 2018, Samuel announced that they would acquire Sierra Aluminum of Riverside, California.

On June 1, 2021, Samuel announced that they had acquired Systematix Inc. of Waterloo, Ontario.
