= University of Toronto Scarborough Library =

Academic library of the University of Toronto

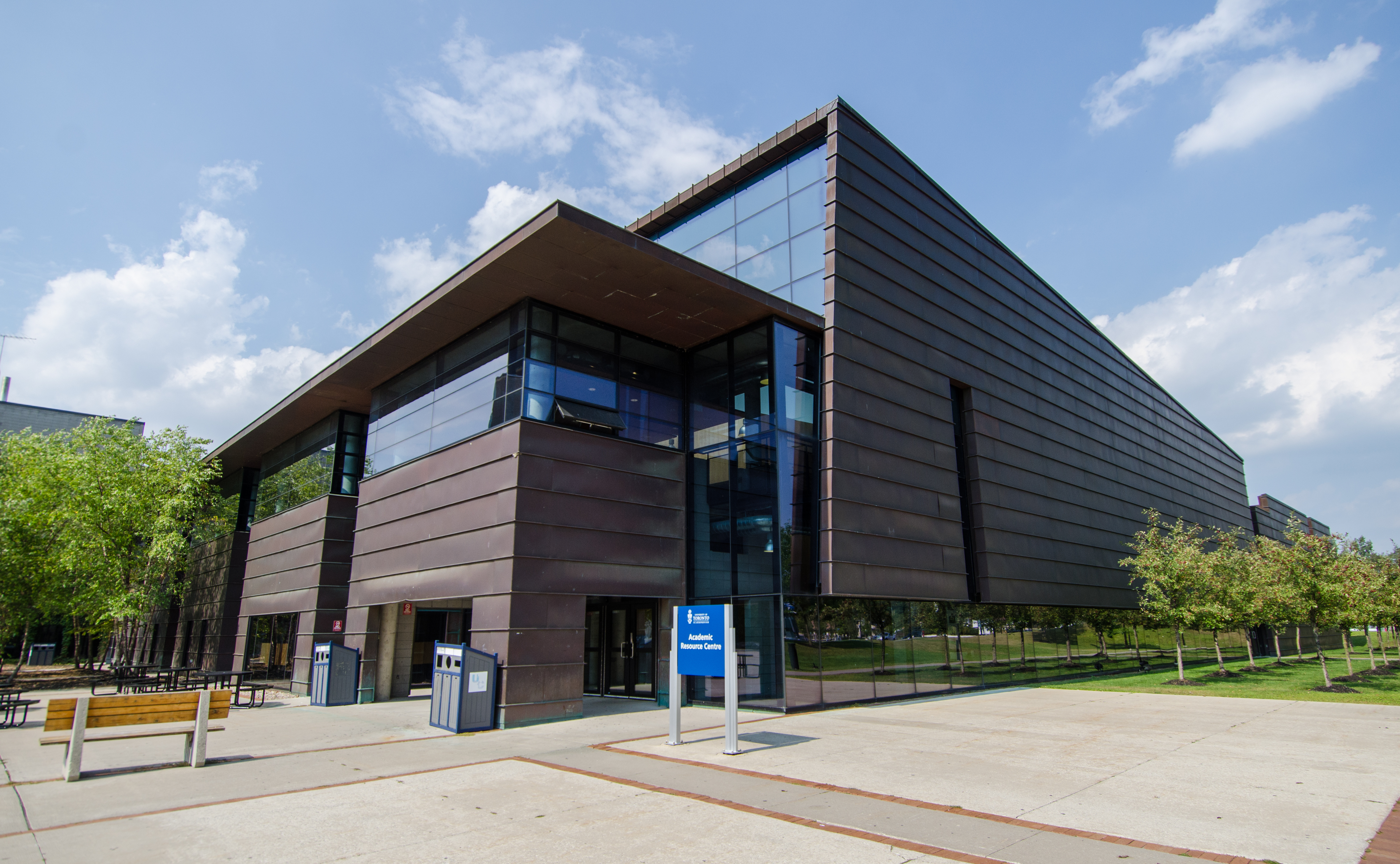
- Exterior of the Academic Resource Centre, which houses the U of T Scarborough Library
- 43°47′3″N 79°11′11″W
- Location: Academic Resource Centre; 1265 Military Trail, Toronto, Ontario, Canada
- Type: Academic library
- Established: 1982 (44 years ago)
- Branch of: University of Toronto Libraries

Collection
- Size: 400,000

Other information
- Chief librarian: Angela Hamilton
- Public transit access: UTSC bus terminal
- Website: Official website

The University of Toronto Scarborough Library (U of T Scarborough Library) is a branch of the University of Toronto Libraries system, located on the university's Scarborough campus in Toronto, Ontario, Canada.

Located on the ground floor of the Academic Resource Centre (ARC), it is the largest and primary library on the Scarborough campus, with a collection of over 400,000 volumes in print, journals, audio, and film.

== History ==
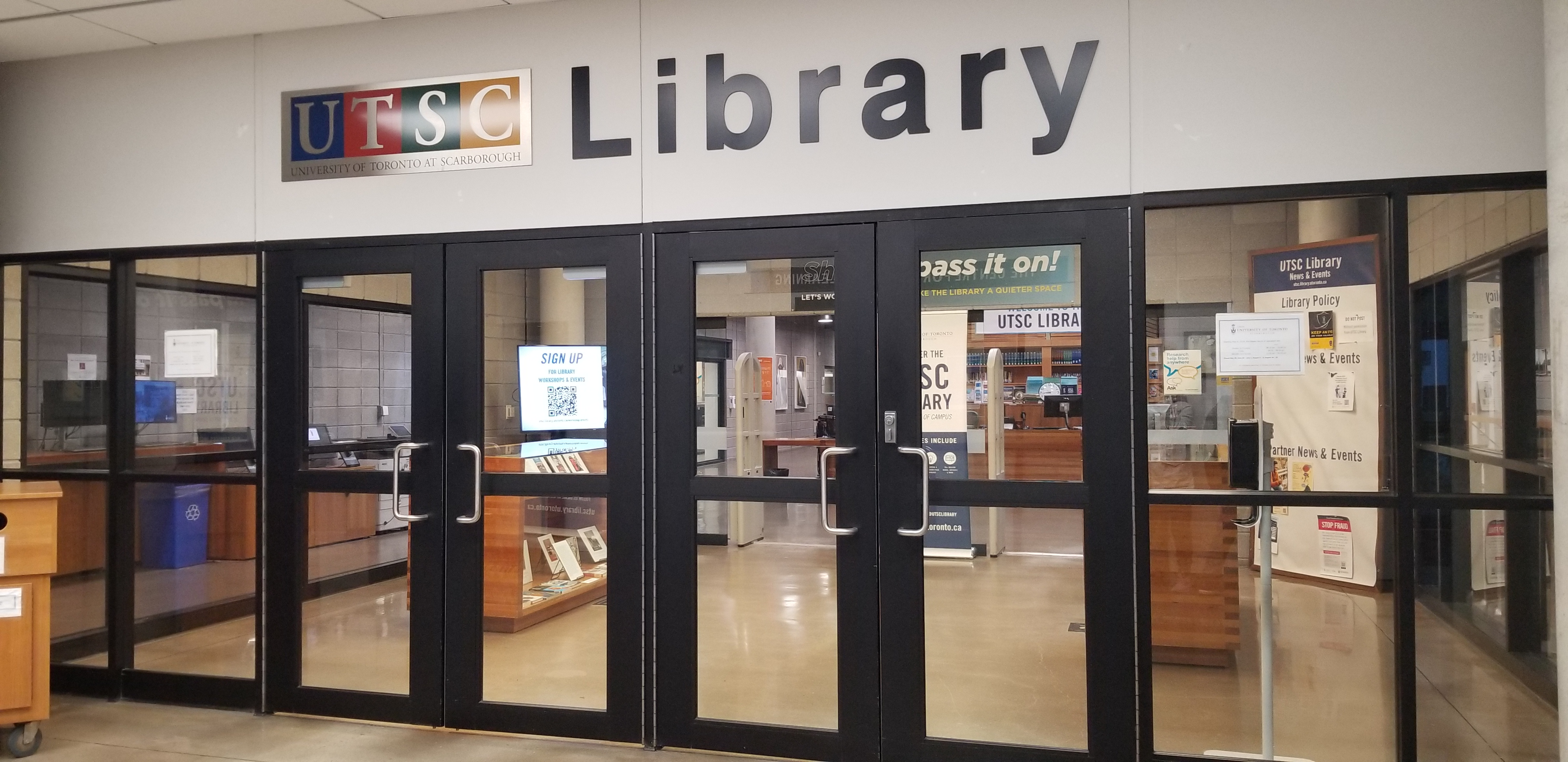
Interior entrance to the library

The Scarborough campus was originally opened as Scarborough College in 1964, and originally did not have its own library. It originally used a small space in the Science Wing to store its collection at a time when the college had a total student enrolment of around 200. The college grew out of the space, and students raised $400,000 for the construction of a proper library in 1978. This led to the opening of the Vincent W. Bladen Library in 1982. However, as the campus continued to expand more space was needed, and the current U of T Scarborough Library was established in the Academic Resource Centre, designed by RDH Architects, in 2003.

== Collections ==
The library holds a collection of over 400,000 print, journal, audio and video volumes. Its archives and special collections include rare materials for teaching and research at the University of Toronto, materials documenting the history of the Scarborough campus and also the Scarborough community, among other historical materials.

== Facilities ==
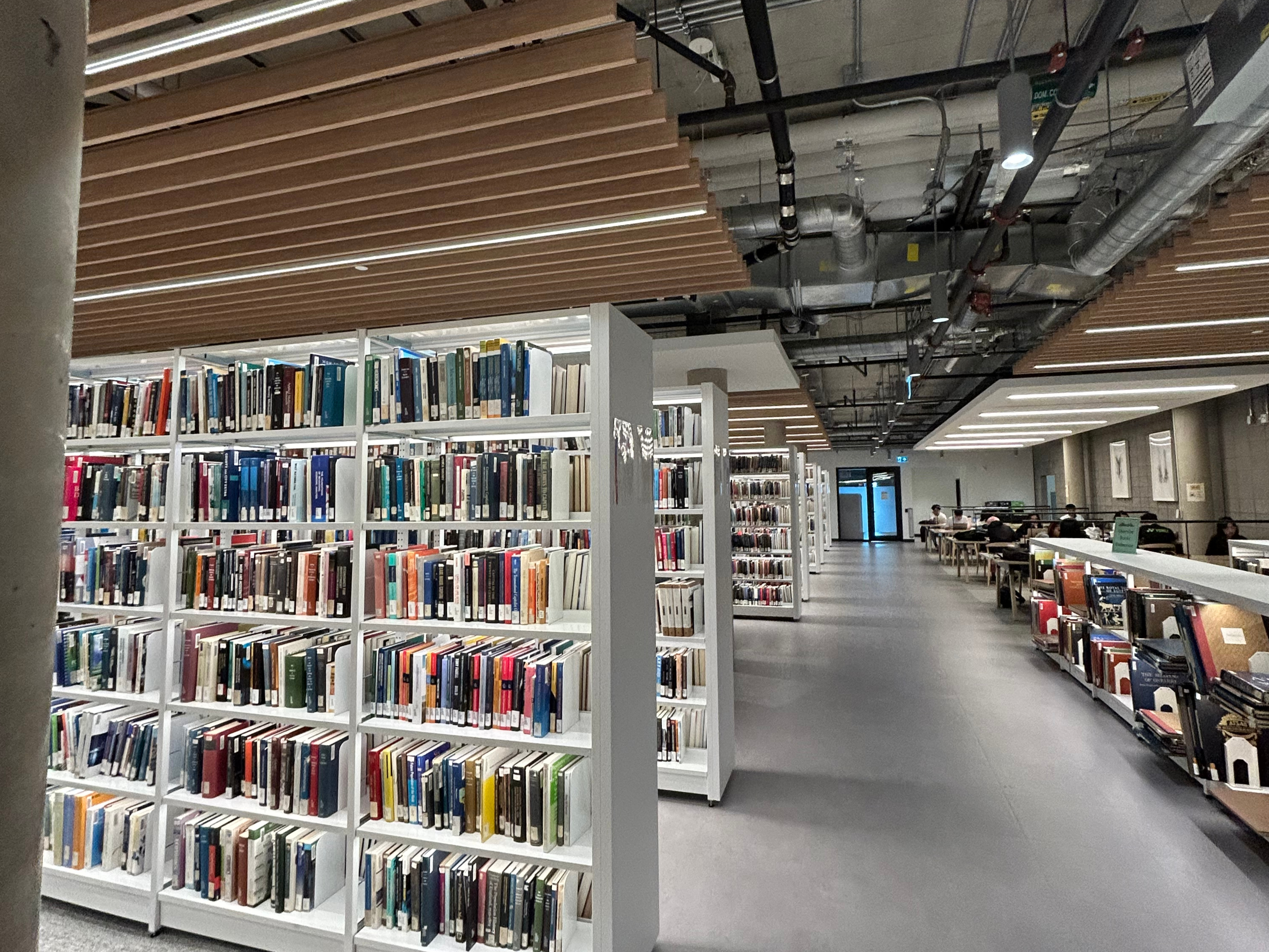
The stacks, U of T Scarborough Library

The U of T Scarborough Library contains an open stacks section, quiet study zones, group study rooms, individual carrels across two floors, and over 200 computer stations.

=== The BRIDGE ===
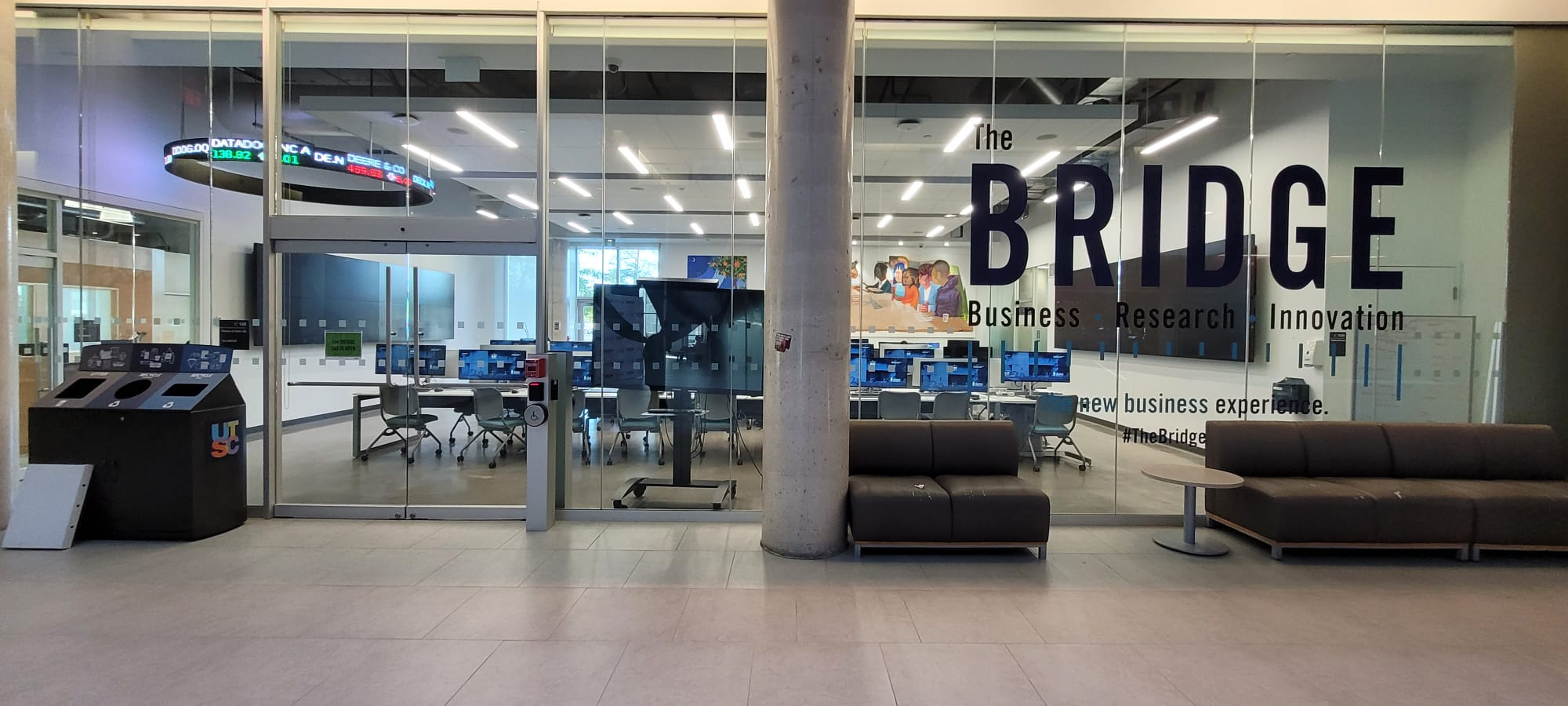
The BRIDGE

The U of T Scarborough Library and Department of Management jointly operate The BRIDGE, a hub for business research on the Scarborough campus. It hosts a business research library, data lab, and lounge, and is located on the ground floor of the campus's Instructional Centre.

== See also ==
- University of Toronto Libraries
