= 2019 Toronto feces attacks =

2019 spree of assaults in Toronto

- The alleged suspect carrying a bucket outside the Scott Library
- Location: Robarts Library, University of Toronto; Scott Library, York University; Intersection of College Street and McCaul Street
- Date: November 22, 2019 (University of Toronto), November 24, 2019 (York University), November 25, 2019 (College and McCaul street intersection)
- Target: Random civilians
- Attack type: Assault
- Weapons: Three buckets, each containing human waste
- Victims: 5
- Assailant: Samuel Opoku
- Motive: Unknown; possibly mental health issues

In November 2019, a series of assaults took place across Toronto, Ontario, mostly in libraries on university campuses. The alleged assailant, 23-year-old Samuel Opoku (commonly known as "The Pee Pee Poo Poo Man"), attacked five people with buckets containing liquefied feces and urine. The three assaults, which took place between November 22 and 25, drew media attention for the nature of the crimes committed.

== Incidents ==
On November 22, 2019, at around 5:20 p.m. local time, Samuel Opoku allegedly entered Robarts Library, a research library on the St. George campus of the University of Toronto, with a bucket that reportedly contained human waste. He proceeded to pour the contents of the bucket onto a mother and a child seated at a table, with witnesses stating that they heard him laughing as he fled. Two days later, on November 24 at approximately 5 p.m., Opoku is alleged to have entered Scott Library, a research library on the Keele Campus of York University, also carrying a bucket suspected to contain feces. He emptied the bucket onto a man and woman. The next day, on November 25, Opoku, wearing a construction helmet and a dark blue jacket, is alleged to have approached a woman just before midnight near the intersection of College Street and McCaul Street carrying an orange Home Depot bucket. He allegedly poured the contents of the bucket over the woman before running away, leaving the bucket at the scene.

Around 6 p.m. on November 26, Opoku was arrested in the Queen Street West and Spadina Avenue area. He was charged with five counts of assault with a weapon and five counts of mischief. Opoku made his first court appearance on November 27, one day after his arrest.

== Reactions ==
Constable Alex Li, a spokesperson for the Toronto Police Service (TPS), said in an interview with CBC News Toronto that the incidents were "very disturbing" and thanked the public for its help in providing information. Another police constable, David Hopkinson, admitted during a press conference that he was at a loss for words regarding the attacks. Police chief Mark Saunders called the incidents "serious offences". Mayor of Toronto John Tory, in a tweet, expressed relief upon hearing that Opoku was arrested, stating that he hoped the arrest would calm concern on school campuses across the city. Even though all victims of the attacks were Asian, a police spokesman said that the TPS do not believe the incidents were racially motivated.

Students at universities across Toronto, especially those at the University of Toronto, described a "sense of fear" that spread throughout campuses, with one student acknowledging that "it was all anyone was talking about". Many students of Toronto schools gathered outside the courthouse at Old City Hall where Opoku's first court hearing was supposed to take place.

== Aftermath and legacy ==
Opoku was granted bail in December 2019, and his defense lawyer stated that Opoku had been struggling with his mental health. Opoku was arrested again in May 2026, on two counts of sexual assault and one count of indecent exposure.

The Pee Pee Poo Poo Man, an indie horror comedy movie partially inspired by the incidents, was released in 2024. It was screened at TIFF Next Wave in 2025.
