= Gerstein Science Information Centre =

Main science library of the University of Toronto

Coordinates: 43.661814°N 79.39365°W

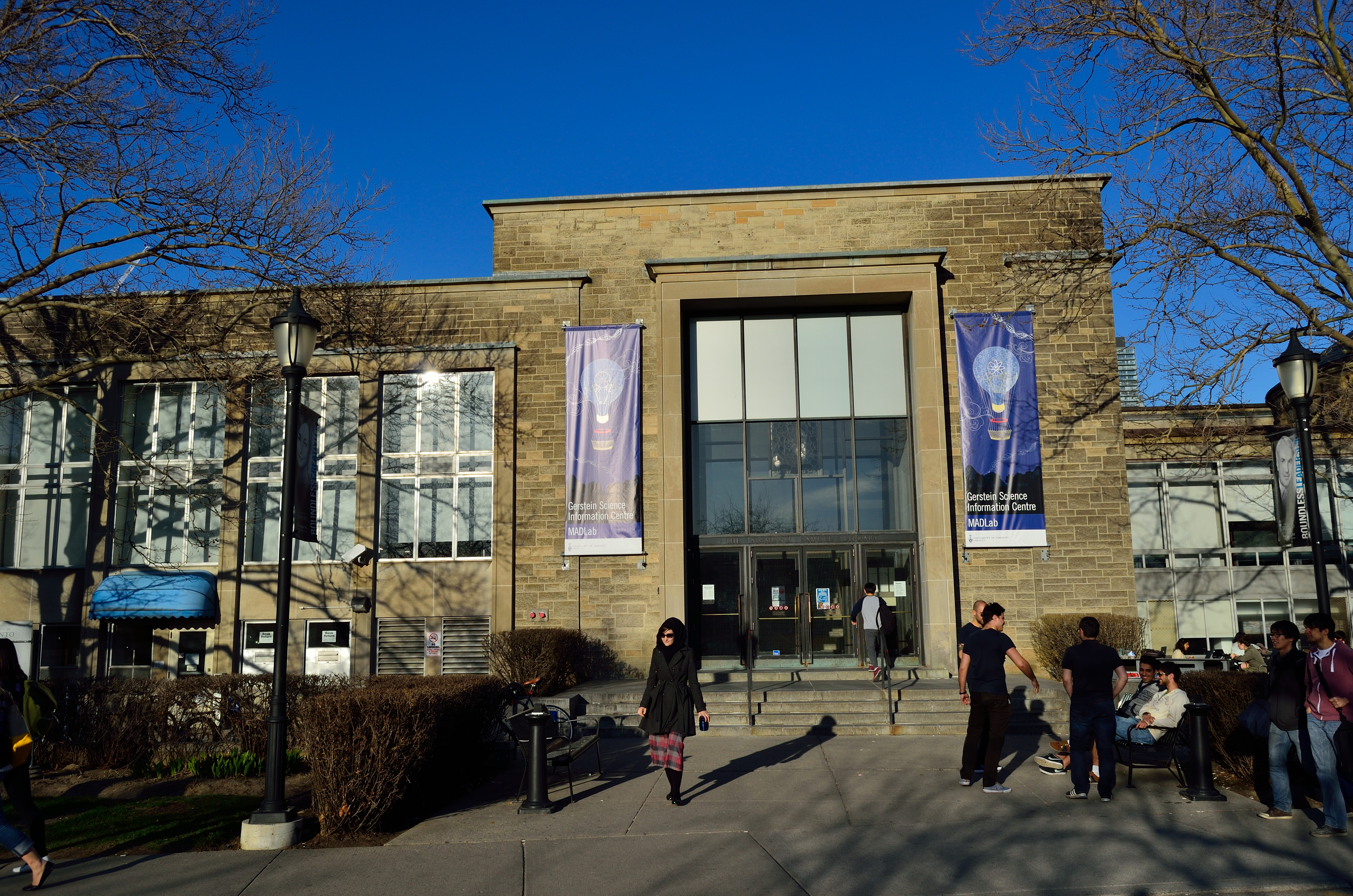
- Sigmund Samuel Library Building exterior
- Location: Sigmund Samuel Library Building; 9 King's College Circle, Toronto, Ontario, Canada
- Type: Academic library
- Established: 1892; 134 years ago
- Architects: David Brash Dick, Darling and Pearson, Mathers & Haldenby, Diamond Schmitt Architects
- Branch of: University of Toronto Libraries

Collection
- Size: 500,000 title

Other information
- Public transit access: Queen's Park
- Website: Official website

Ontario Heritage Act
- Criteria: Listed
- Designated: 1973

The Gerstein Science Information Centre is the University of Toronto's flagship library supporting the sciences and health sciences. The largest science and health science academic library in Canada, Gerstein has a collection of over 945,000 print volumes of journals and books, and also provides access to over 100,000 online journals and books. It is located in the Sigmund Samuel Library Building, a listed heritage building on the St. George campus in downtown Toronto, Ontario, Canada.

The Gerstein Science Information Centre's collection consists primarily of material on the sciences, including the health sciences, medicine, physics, chemistry, biology and their subfields, with the exception of mathematical journals and forestry, botany and geology materials. The library provides varying degrees of access to students, faculty, external researchers, and members of the public.

== History ==
The library originally existed as the main University of Toronto library, and maintained this status from 1892 to 1973. In 1973, the humanities and social sciences materials were moved to the then newly-built Robarts Library, and the remaining collection was divided between the undergraduate Sigmund Samuel Library and the Science and Medicine Library. In 1997, the Science and Medicine Library was renamed the Gerstein Science Information Centre after a significant donation from a benefactor, the Frank Gerstein Charitable Foundation.

== Renovation work ==
The restored 1892 ceiling of the Gerstein Reading Room

The most recent renovations at Gerstein were similarly funded by the Frank Gerstein Charitable Foundation and the Bertrand Gerstein Family Foundation, and were completed in the fall of 2008. The Gerstein Reading Room, a spacious study area for students restored to its 1892 original state, was the end product of the renovations. The stunning ceiling architecture revealed by the renovation came as a surprise to Diamond Schmitt Architects, who made their discovery while renewing the heritage wing of the Centre. The renovation also included the addition of group study rooms for students. The previous expansion of 2003, the Morrison Pavilion, provides students with modern study carrels equipped with power outlets and wired Ethernet connections and was possible due to a donation by University of Toronto alumni Russell and Katherine Morrison.

== Coat of arms ==
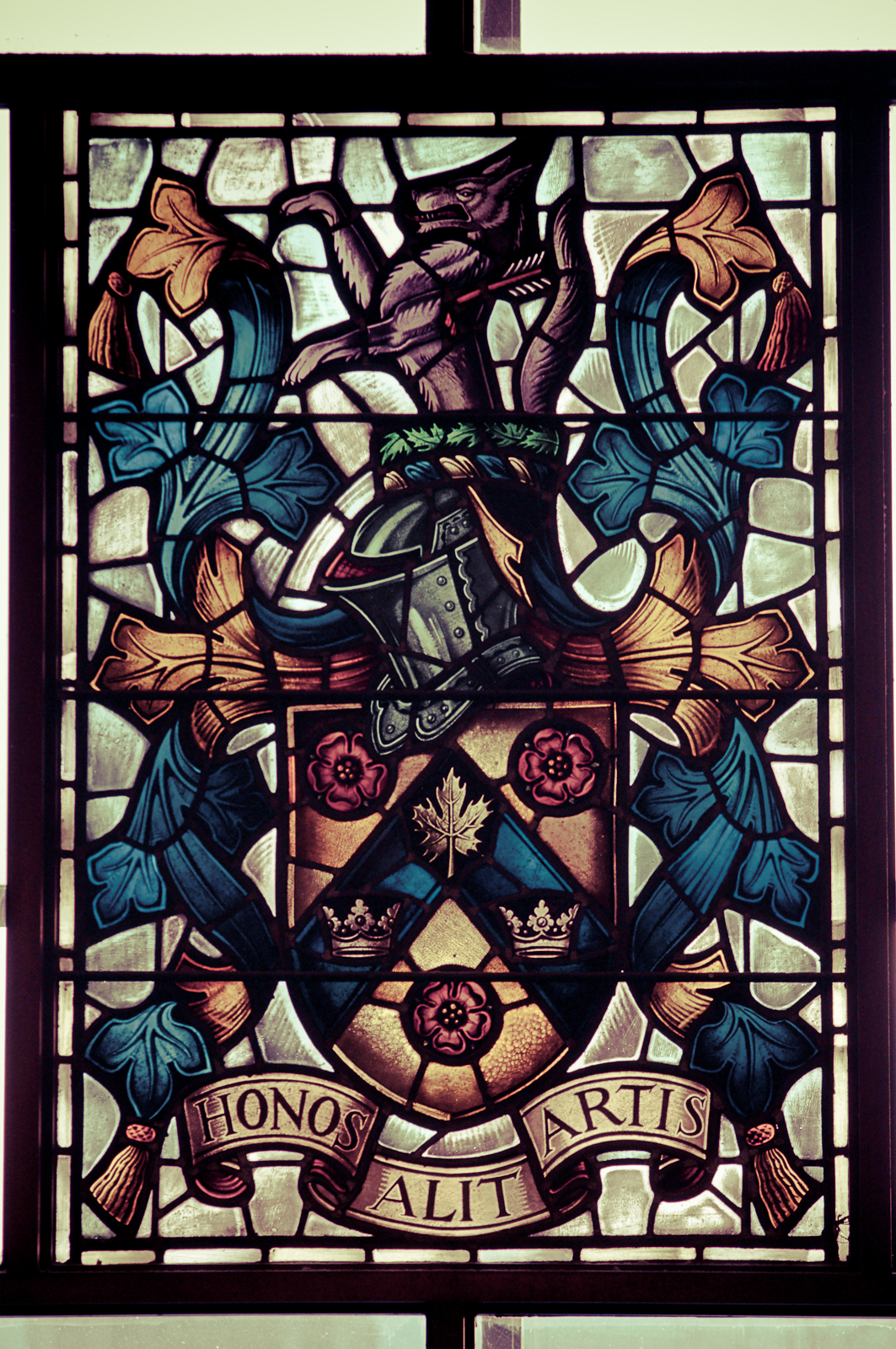
The Samuel family coat of arms on a stained glass window

The entrance to the library features a stained glass window with the Samuel family crest, as Sigmund Samuel's donation led to the construction of the Sigmund Samuel Library Building. Below the coat of arms is the phrase Honos Alit Artis (Latin), meaning "honour exalts the arts."

== See also ==
- Robarts Library
- University of Toronto Libraries
