= University of Toronto Libraries =

Academic library system in Ontario, Canada

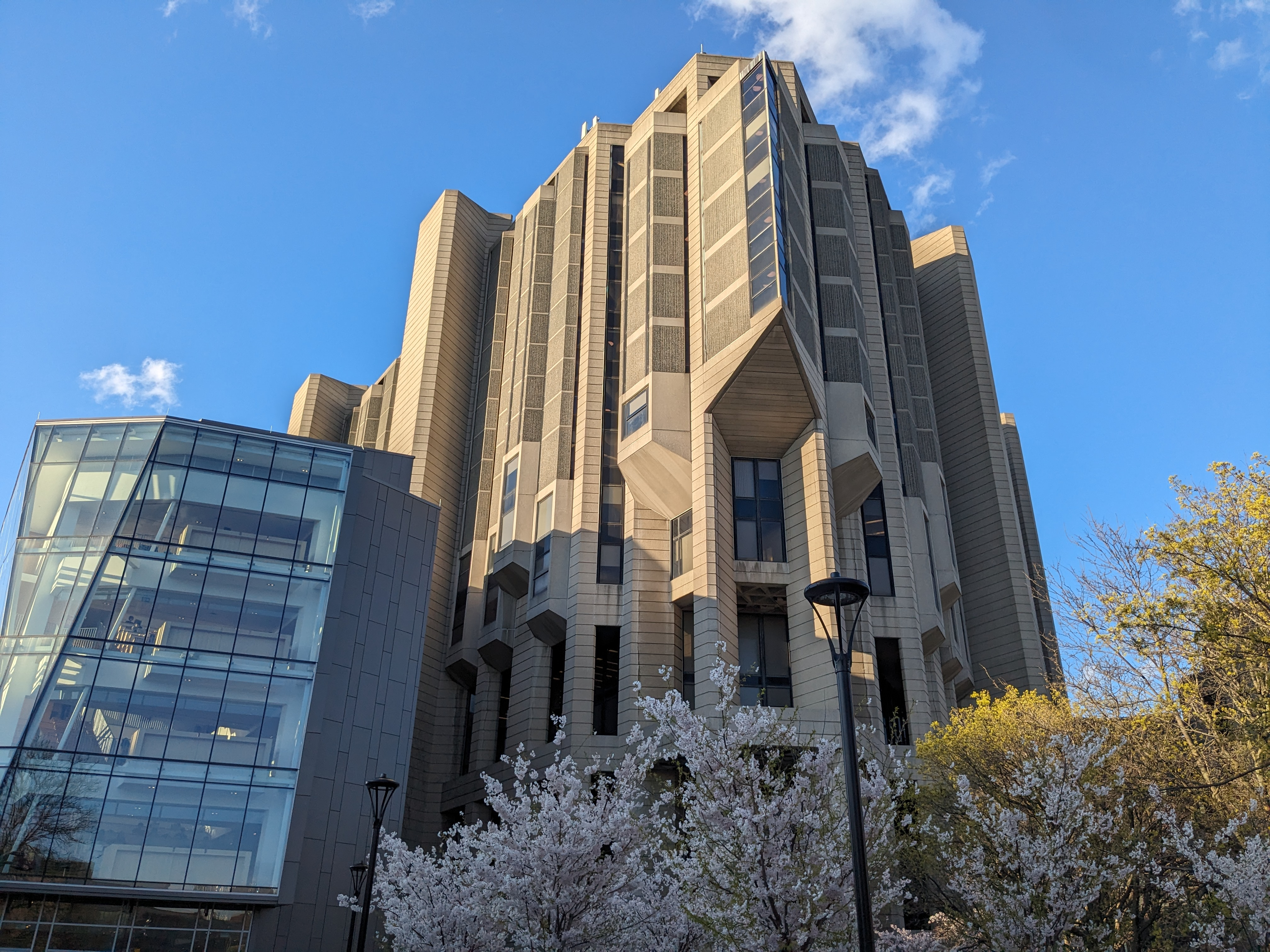
- Robarts Library, the largest in the UTL system, located on the St. George campus
- Location: Greater Toronto Area, Ontario, Canada
- Type: Academic library
- Established: 1892; 134 years ago
- Branches: 40

Collection
- Items collected: Books, journals, newspapers, sound recordings, databases, maps, drawings and manuscripts
- Size: 12,426,395 physical volumes, 5.6 million microforms, 2,624,513 digital books, 184,228 e-journal titles, 33,063 linear metres archival material (2020)

Other information
- Budget: CAD $111 million (including CAD $41 million for collections, CAD $45 million for salaries, CAD $10 million for benefits, and CAD $13 million for other expenses)
- University Chief Librarian: Constantia Constantinou
- Employees: 683 (including student assistants)
- Parent organization: University of Toronto
- Affiliation: ARL; CARL; OCUL
- Website: library.utoronto.ca

The University of Toronto Libraries (UTL) system is the largest academic library in Canada and is ranked third among peer institutions in North America, behind only Harvard and Yale. The system consists of 40 libraries located on the University of Toronto's three campuses: St. George, Mississauga and Scarborough, with most in downtown Toronto.

This array of college libraries, special collections, and specialized libraries and information centres supports the teaching and research requirements of 215 graduate programs, over 60 professional programs, and more than 700 undergraduate degree programs. In addition to more than 12 million print volumes in 341 languages, the library system currently provides access to 184,228 journal titles, millions of electronic resources in various forms and more than 33,000 linear metres of archival material. As of 2014, more than 150,000 new print volumes were acquired each year.

The largest library in the system is the John P. Robarts Research Library, located on the St. George campus, which houses the main collection of social sciences and humanities research resources at the University of Toronto. The Robarts Library complex is also home to the central Libraries’ administrative offices, exhibit galleries, Scotiabank Information Commons, Centre for Teaching Support & Innovation, Cheng Yu Tung East Asian Library, Richard Charles Lee Canada-Hong Kong Library, Map & Data Library, Petro Jacyk Central & East European Resource Centre and the Media Commons. Robarts Library is only accessible to University of Toronto students, faculty, staff, and those with a valid ID card.

The Thomas Fisher Rare Book Library is connected to Robarts Library and is open to the public. It houses both the Department of Rare Books and Special Collections and the University of Toronto Archives and Records Management Services (UTARMS). It is Canada's largest rare book library and its holdings include books, manuscripts, maps, and graphic and audiovisual material covering a broad range of subjects and time periods.

Also located on the St. George campus, the Gerstein Science Information Centre is the main library for the science and health science disciplines. In addition to the centre's comprehensive print collection, there is a vast selection of health and scientific databases and indexes available online.

== Partnerships and collaboration ==
The University of Toronto Libraries system is a member of the Association of Research Libraries, Canadian Association of Research Libraries, and the Ontario Council of University Libraries.

== Branches ==
=== Main ===
UTL has four main branches spread across the three U of T campuses. The John P. Robarts Research Library is the university's main social sciences and humanities library, while the Gerstein Science Information Centre is the main library for sciences. Both are located on the St. George campus in downtown Toronto. The Mississauga and Scarborough campuses are each home to one large general-subject library, the U of T Mississauga Library and U of T Scarborough Library, respectively.

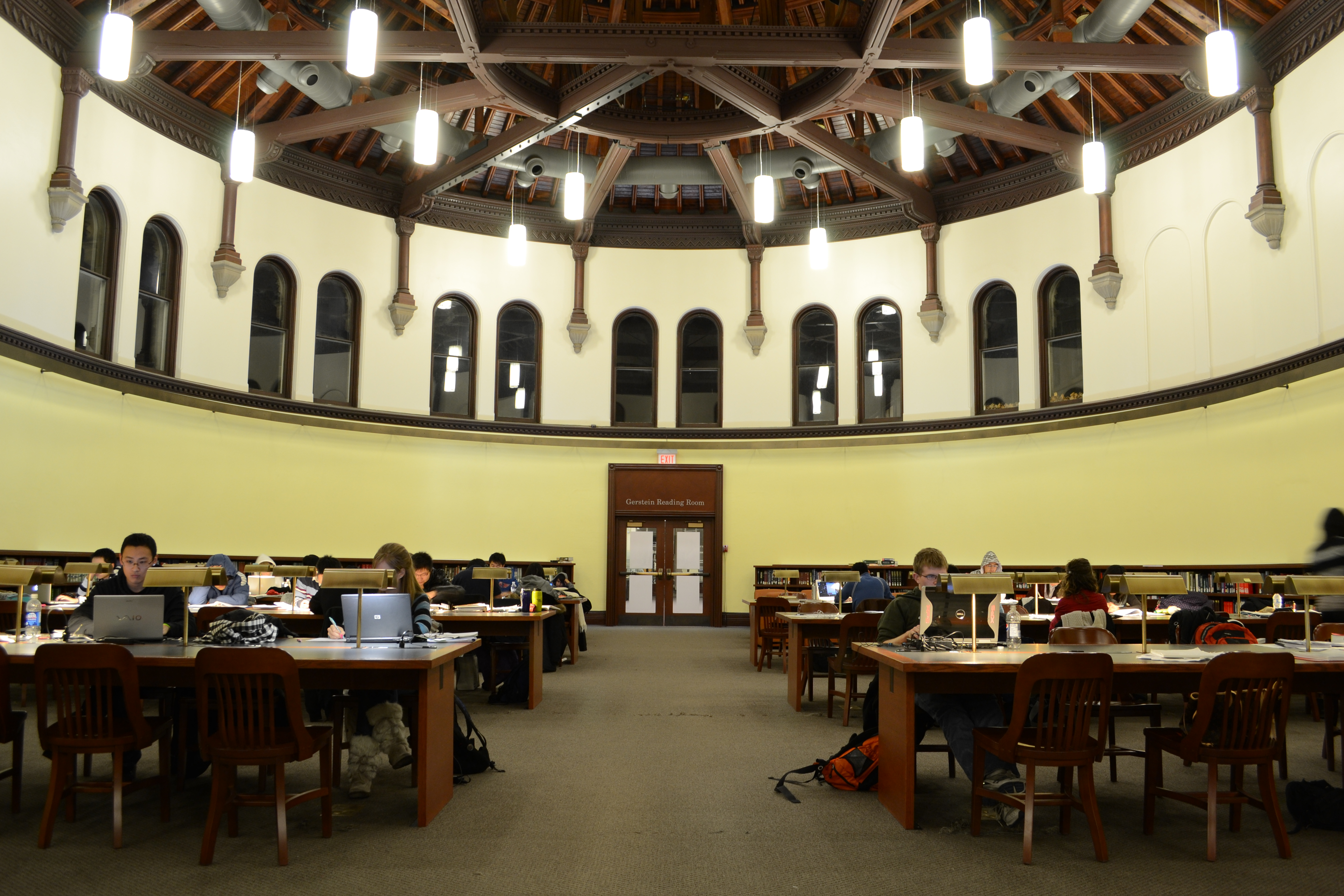
Gerstein Science Information Centre

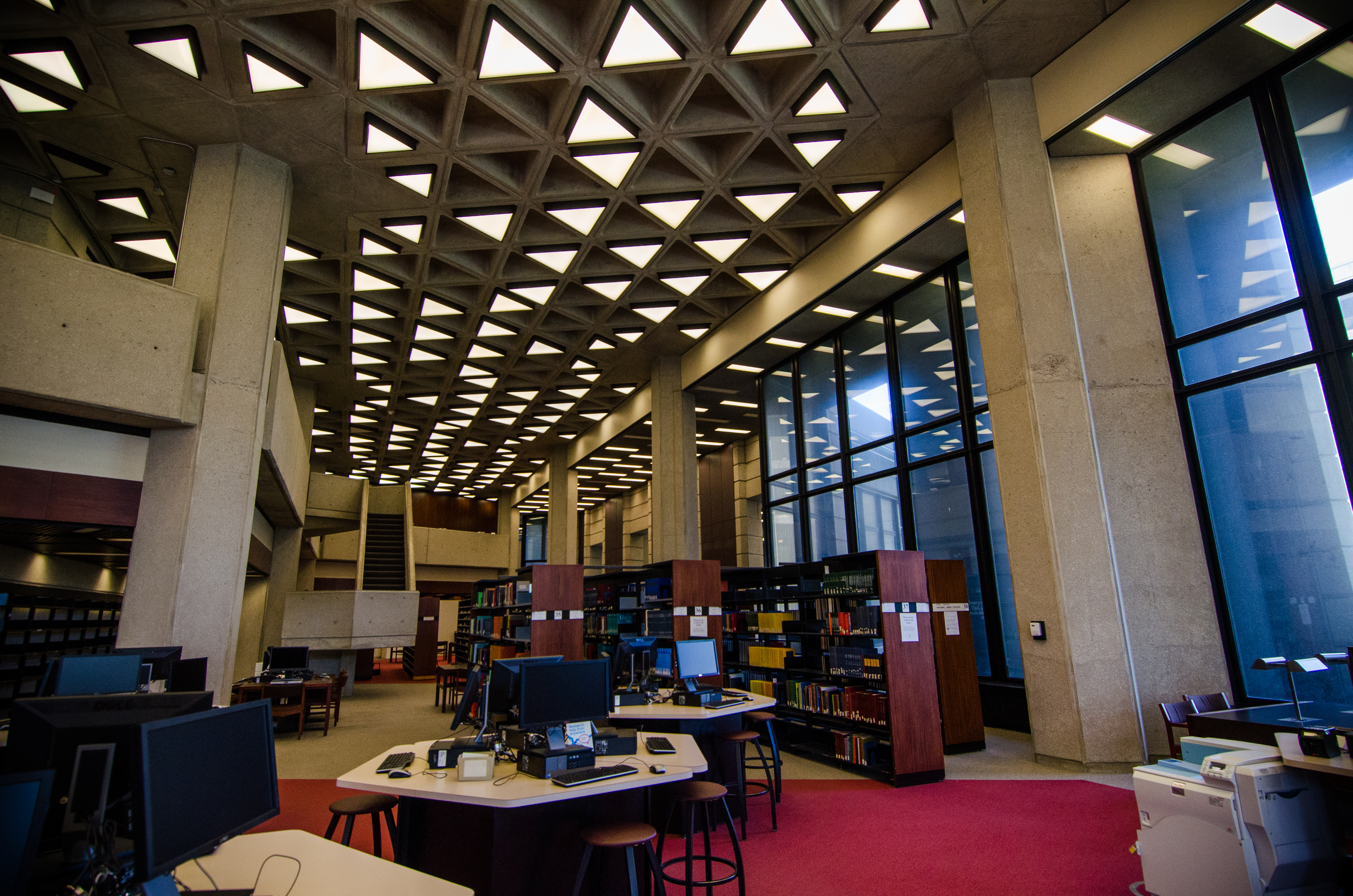
John P. Robarts Research Library

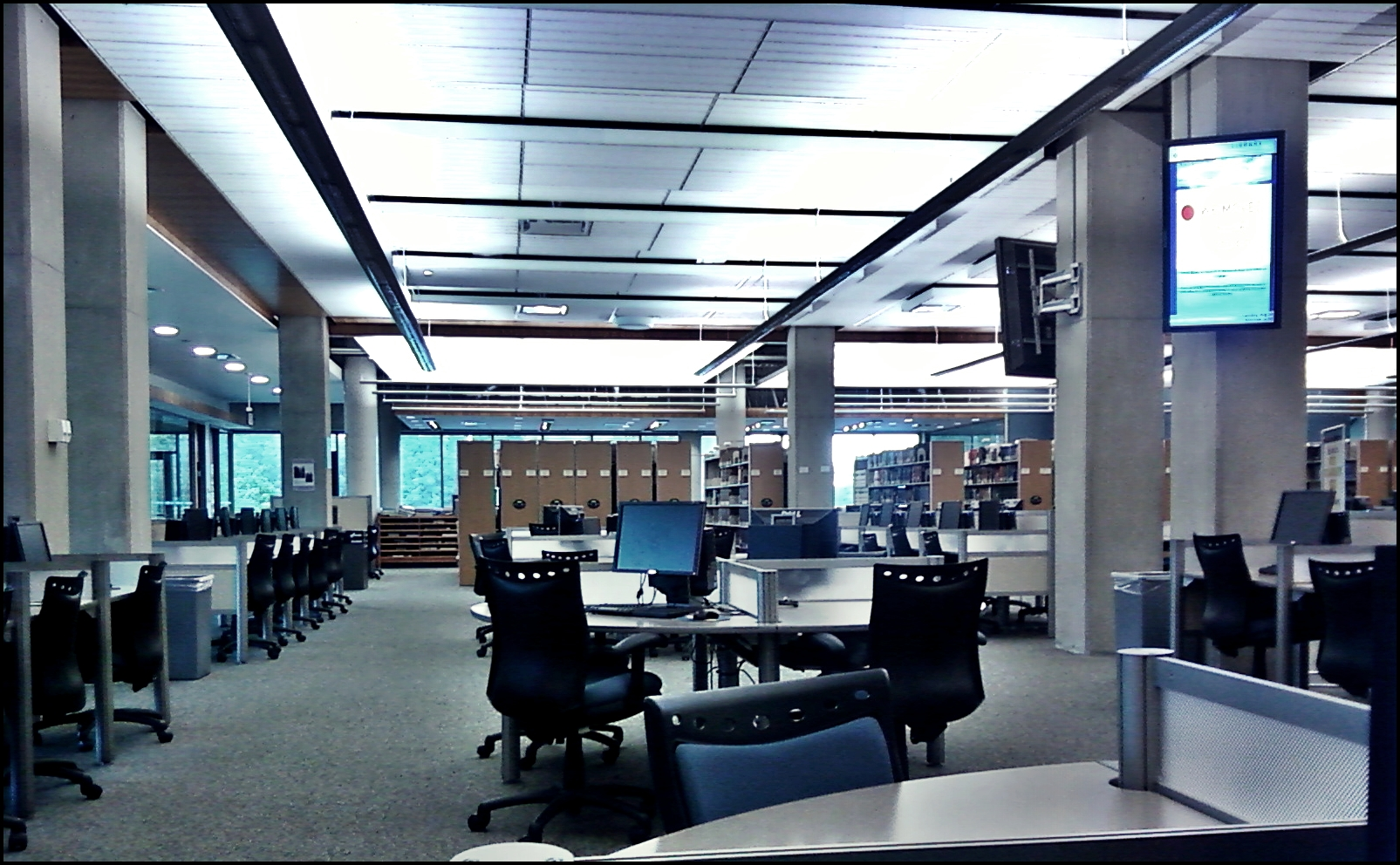
U of T Mississauga Library

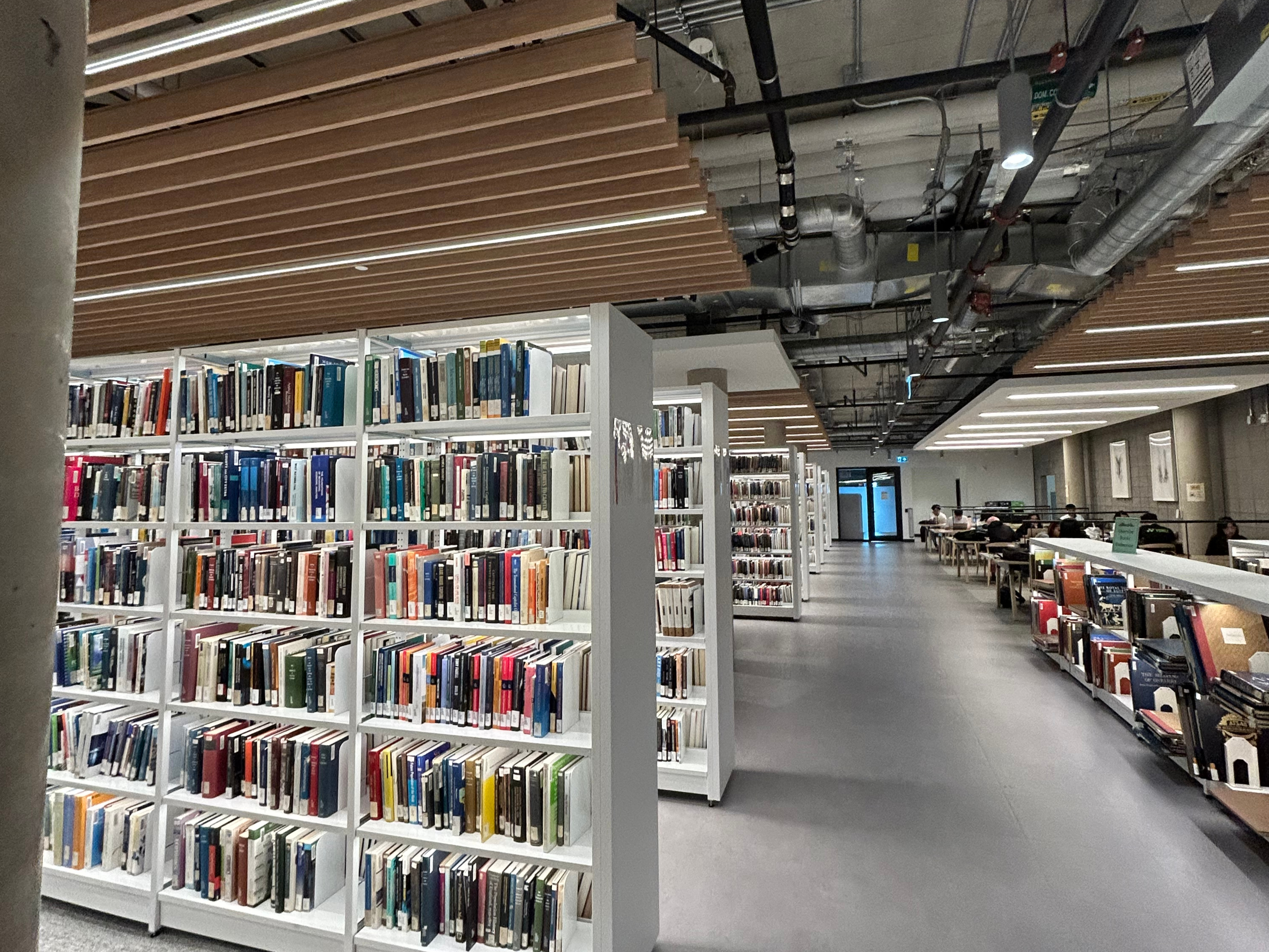
U of T Scarborough Library

=== Colleges ===
College	Name	Campus	Image
Innis College	Innis College Library	St. George	
Knox College	Caven Library	St. George	
Massey College	Robertson Davies Library	St. George	
New College	Ivey Library	St. George	
St. Michael's College	John M. Kelly Library	St. George	
Trinity College and Wycliffe College	John W. Graham Library	St. George	
University College	University College Library	St. George	
Victoria University	E. J. Pratt Library	St. George	
Victoria University	Emmanuel College Library	St. George	

=== Subject ===
Subject	Name	Campus	Image
Architecture, landscape, and design	Eberhard Zeidler Library	St. George	
Arts (fine)	Department of Art Library	St. George	
Business	The BRIDGE	Scarborough	
Business	Milt Harris Library	St. George	
Ceramics	Gail Brooker Ceramic Research Library at the Gardiner Museum	St. George	
Chemistry	A. D. Allen Library	St. George	
Christian studies	Institute for Christian Studies	St. George	
Criminology	Centre for Criminology Library	St. George	
Dentistry	Harry R. Abbott Memorial Library	St. George	
Earth Sciences	Noranda Library	St. George	
East Asian studies	Cheng Yu Tung East Asian Library	St. George	
Education	OISE Library	St. George	
Engineering and Computer Science	Engineering and Computer Science Library	St. George	
European studies	Petro Jacyk Central and East European Resource Centre	St. George	
First Nations studies	First Nations House Library	St. George	
Geography	Map and Data Library	St. George	
Hong Kong studies	Richard Charles Lee Canada-Hong Kong Library	St. George	
Industrial Relations and Human Resources	Newman Library	St. George	
Law	Bora Laskin Law Library	St. George	
Mathematics	Mathematical Sciences Library	St. George	
Media	Media Commons	St. George	
Music	Music Library	St. George	
Mediaeval Studies	Pontifical Institute of Mediæval Studies Library	St. George	
Physics, astronomy and astrophysics	Physics Library	St. George	
Rare books	Thomas Fisher Rare Book Library	St. George	
Seminary	St. Augustine's Seminary Library	St. George	
Archival	Royal Ontario Museum Library and Archives	–	
Archival	University of Toronto Archives and Records Management Services (UTARMS)	St. George	
Archival	UTL at Downsview	–	
Miscellaneous	U of T Schools (UTS) Library Information Centre	St. George	

== Chief librarians ==
University Librarian

- John McCaul (1843–1852)
- John William Small (1852–1853)
- Alexander Lorimer (1854–1868)
- John Edgeworth Thomson (1868–1872)
- William Henry Van der Smissen (1873–1891)
- Hugh Hornby Langton (1892–1923)
- William Stewart Wallace (1923–1954)

University Chief Librarian

- Robert Harold Blackburn (1954–1981)
- Marilyn Sharrow (1982–1985)
- Carol Moore (1986–2011)
- Larry Paul Alford (2011–present)
- Constantia Constantinou (2026–present)
