= Cheng Yu Tung East Asian Library =

Library in Toronto, Ontario, Canada

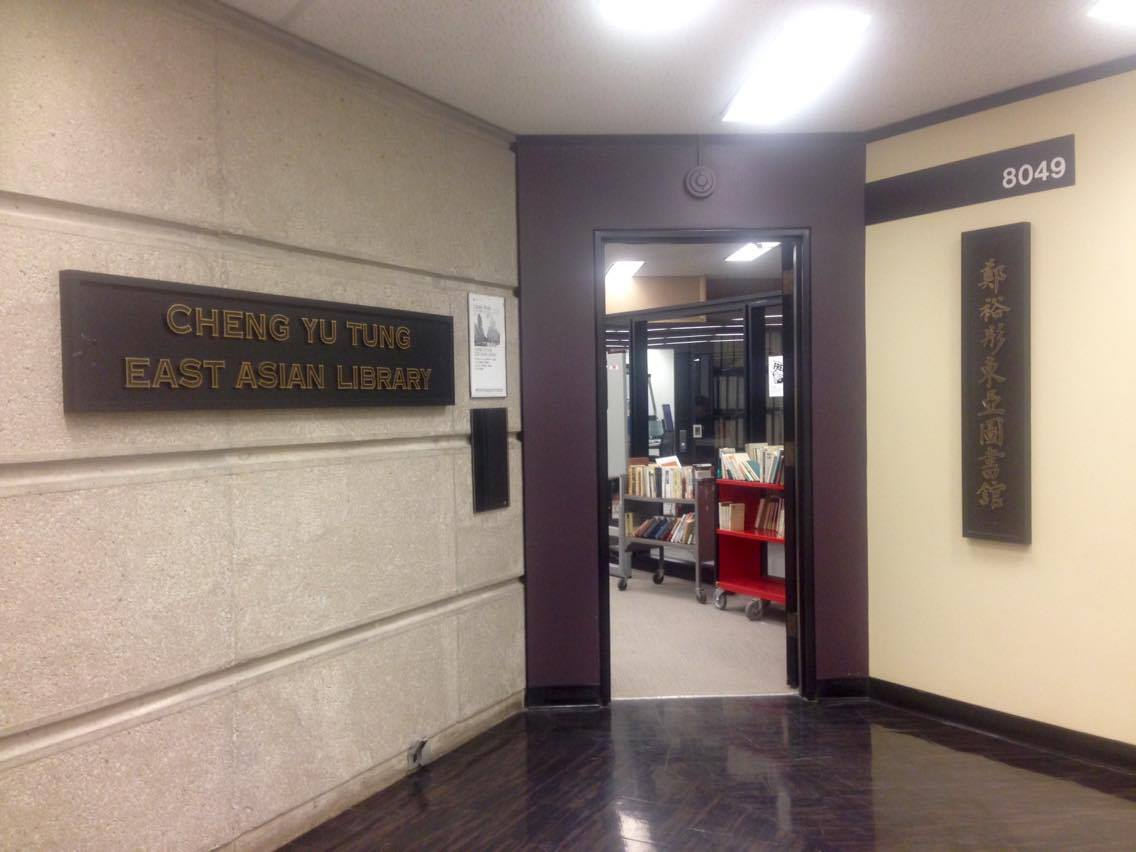
- 43°39′52″N 79°23′58″W
- Location: Robarts Library, 8th floor 130 St. George Street, Toronto, Ontario, Canada
- Type: Academic library
- Established: 1930s
- Branch of: University of Toronto Libraries

Collection
- Size: 660,000

Other information
- Public transit access: at St. George or Spadina
- Website: east.library.utoronto.ca

The Cheng Yu Tung East Asian Library (Chinese: 鄭裕彤東亞圖書館) is a Canadian library and a part of the University of Toronto Libraries system. Located on the 8th floor of Robarts Library on the University of Toronto's St. George campus, it is a major research collection on East Asian Studies in North America with over 660,000 volumes. The Library is no longer open to the general public. It was named for the Hong Kong businessman Cheng Yu-tung in 1991.

The Library began with a collection of rare materials acquired from China in the 1930s. This special collection is now known as the Mu Collection (慕氏藏書). Extensive additional materials in Chinese, Japanese, Korean, Tibetan and Mongolian have been added over the years. The Library organizes about 10-15 events annually, promoting East Asian Studies/Asian Canadian Studies through collaborative partnerships with campus units and various external organizations.

== Collections ==
=== Chinese ===
The Cheng Yu Tung East Asian Library has over 346,000 research materials, including monographs, serials, microforms, electronic resources, and audiovisual materials focused on the humanities and social sciences. The library now has one of the largest Chinese academic collections in Canada.

=== Japanese ===
With over 200,000 volumes in 2018, the collection of Japanese materials at the Cheng Yu Tung East Asian Library is the largest in size in Canada, and one of the largest in North America. Areas of strength are in the humanities and social sciences, with a particular focus on history and literature of all periods, but also including comprehensive holdings in the areas of philosophy and religion, politics & government, anthropology, sociology, women's studies and film studies. In addition to the Library's print and electronic collections, the Library also houses a number of unique Japanese-Canadian archival materials.

=== Korean ===
The library has the largest and the oldest research of Korean collection for Korean studies in Canada, with over 75,000 volumes. Areas of strength include philosophy, history, the Korean War, folklore, social sciences, political sciences, fine arts, language and literature.

=== Tibetan ===
Since 2013, the University of Toronto Libraries has been collaborating with the Columbia University Libraries to increase the availability of Tibetan resources to a wider community of scholars in both Canada and the United States. As of 2018, the library has over 6,500 volumes.
