= Robert H. Blackburn =

Canadian librarian (1919–2019)

Robert Harold Blackburn
- Born: 3 February 1919; Vegreville, Alberta
- Died: 18 September 2019 (aged 100); Streetsville, Ontario
- Education: University of Alberta (B.A., 1940, M.A., 1941) University of Toronto (B.L.S., 1942) Columbia University (M.L.S., 1948)
- Occupation: Librarian
- Spouse: Frances Patricia Gibson (m. 1942; died 1989)
- Military career
- Allegiance: Canada
- Branch: Royal Canadian Air Force
- Service years: 1942-1945
- Rank: Flight Lieutenant
- Conflicts: World War II

Robert Harold Blackburn (3 February 1919 – 18 September 2019) was a Canadian academic librarian. He is best known for serving as the Chief Librarian at the University of Toronto from 1954 to 1981.

== Early life and education ==
Blackburn was born in Vegreville, Alberta. He attended the University of Alberta, graduating in 1941 with an M.A. He earned a Bachelor of Library Science degree in 1942 from the University of Toronto.

== Career ==
Blackburn served in the Royal Canadian Air Force, then worked at the Calgary Public Library before being hired as an associate librarian at the University of Toronto in 1947. Continuing his education, he earned a M.S. degree from Columbia University in 1948.

Blackburn was promoted to chief librarian for the University of Toronto, succeeding Dr. Wallace, in 1954. At the time, the library had a budget of $170,000.

Blackburn served as the first president of CACUL, the former Canadian Association of College & University Libraries, in 1963 and 1964. The Robert H. Blackburn Distinguished Paper Award, presented annually by the Canadian Library Association, was named in his honour. Blackburn's papers are preserved in the University of Toronto Archives.

Blackburn also served for a number of years as the Chair of the Streetsville Library Board.

Between 1963 and 1967, Blackburn administered the Ontario New Libraries Project under the Ontario Ministry of Education, creating the initial 35,000 book collections for each of three new Ontario universities (Trent, Brock and Guelph) and for Scarborough and Erindale colleges at the University of Toronto.

Blackburn served as a consulting editor on Canadian topics for Collier's Encyclopedia, published in 1967, and contributed to the Encyclopædia Britannica's 1961 Canadian Supplement. In 1949, when Newfoundland became a province of Canada, he edited the Newfoundland supplement to The Encyclopedia of Canada.

Blackburn's 1968 study of the future financial needs of libraries for the Association of Universities and Colleges of Canada was used to plan the development of academic libraries throughout Canada.

Blackburn worked on the international advisory board of the Journal of Library History. He was a contributing writer in The Canadian Historical Review.

Blackburn retired from his job as chief librarian in 1981. By that time he was overseeing a budget of about $15 million.

== Publications ==
Blackburn published several books, including:

- Faculty at Work: Motivation, Expectation, Satisfaction, with Janet H. Lawrence., published in 1995 by Johns Hopkins University Press.
- Evolution of the Heart: A History of the University of Toronto Library up to 1981. Toronto, University of Toronto Libraries, 1989. In Library Quarterly 60 (April 1990): 164–165.
- From barley field to Academe, University of Toronto Library, [2014]
- Robert H. Blackburn (1969). Financial Implications of the Downs Report on Canadian Academic and Research Libraries. Association of Universities and Colleges of Canada.

Other publications include:

- "Interlibrary Cooperation", Research Librarianship: Essays in Honor of Robert B. Downs in 1971
- Various Biographical articles in The Canadian Encyclopedia
- "The Ancient Alexandrian Library: Part of It May Survive!" Library History Vol. 19 No. 1 (March 2003) pp 23–34.
- "Libraries in Canada Today", in the Royal Architectural Institute of Canada Journal, Vol 36 No. 4, April 1959.
