= Robert S. Kenny =

Canadian communist politician (1905–1993)

- Born: February 2, 1905; Lindsay, Canada
- Died: September 28, 1993 (aged 88)
- Education: Riverdale Collegiate Institute
- Political party: Communist Party of Canada

Robert "Bert" S. Kenny (2 February 1905 – 28 September 1993) was a member of the Communist Party of Canada, and a collector of books, documents, and other materials pertaining to the radical and labour movements, particularly in Canada.

Kenny was born of Irish descent in Lindsay, Ontario. He graduated in Toronto from Riverdale Collegiate Institute and later lived and worked in Cleveland and Montréal before returning to Toronto. By the 1950s, he was well-known as a bibliophile with a special interest in collecting materials on communism and other radical and revolutionary movements.

His collection of approximately 25,000 items, the Robert S. Kenny Collection, is held in the University of Toronto Thomas Fisher Rare Book Library. For several years, the Robert S. Kenny Prize in Marxist & Labour/Left Studies was awarded in his honour.
