= Robarts Library =

Academic library of the University of Toronto

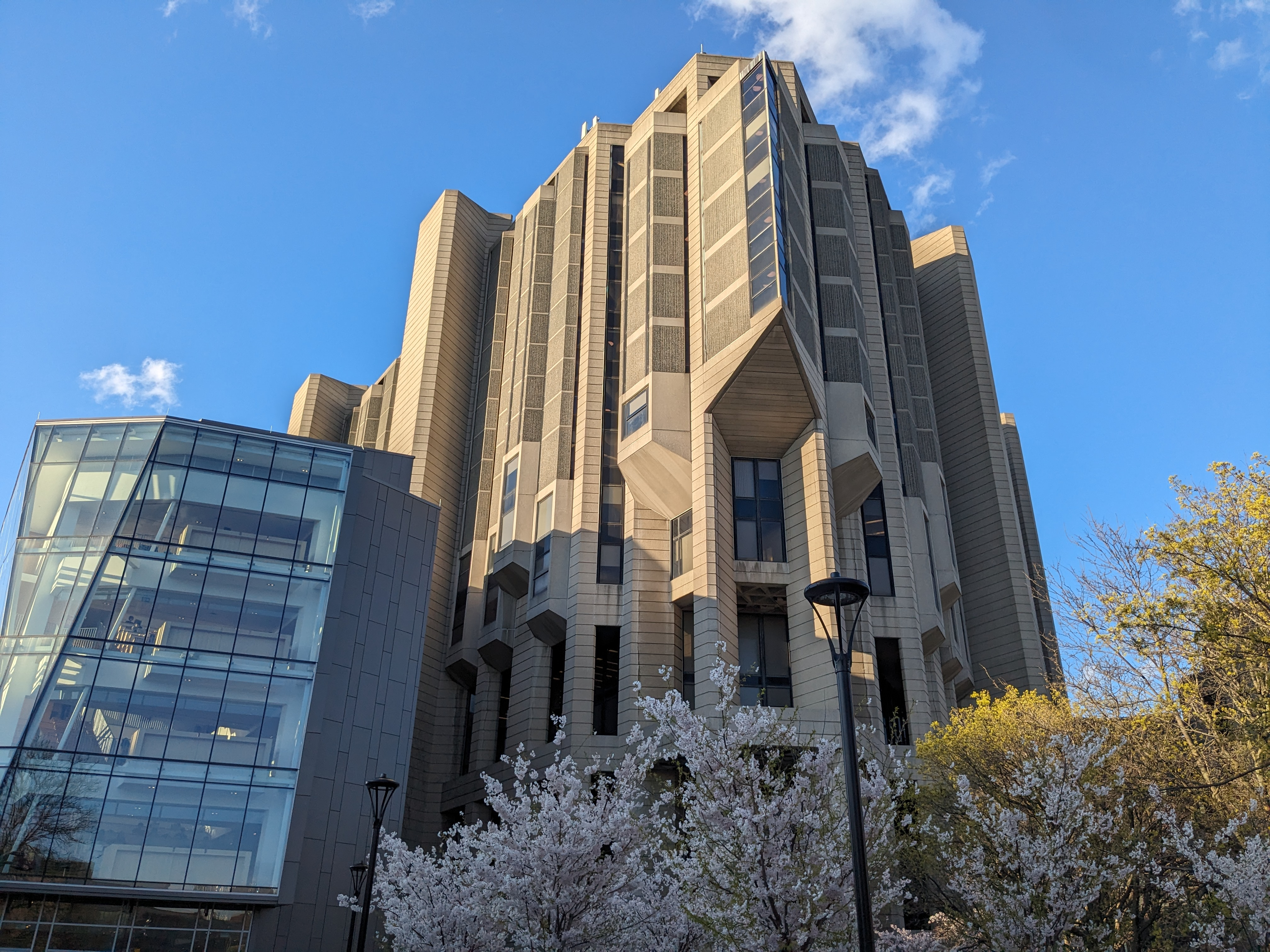
- The library in 2024
- 43°39′52″N 79°23′58″W
- Location: 130 St. George Street; Toronto, Ontario, Canada
- Type: Academic library
- Established: 1973; 53 years ago
- Architects: Mathers & Haldenby Architects / Warner, Burns, Toan & Lunde (Robarts Library); Diamond Schmitt Architects (Robarts Common)
- Branch of: University of Toronto Libraries

Other information
- Public transit access: St. George, Spadina
- Website: Official website

The John P. Robarts Research Library, commonly referred to as Robarts Library (ROH-barts), is the main humanities and social sciences library of the University of Toronto Libraries and the largest individual library at the university, located on the St. George campus in downtown Toronto. Opened in 1973 and named for John Robarts, the 17th Premier of Ontario, the library contains more than 4.5 million bookform items, 4.1 million microform items and 740,000 other items.

The library building is an example of brutalist architecture. Its towering main structure rests on an equilateral triangular footprint and features extensive use of triangular geometric patterns throughout. It forms the main component of a three-tower complex that also includes the Thomas Fisher Rare Book Library and the Claude T. Bissell Building, which houses the Faculty of Information. The library's imposing appearance has earned it the nicknames Fort Book and The Peacock/Turkey.

== Architecture ==
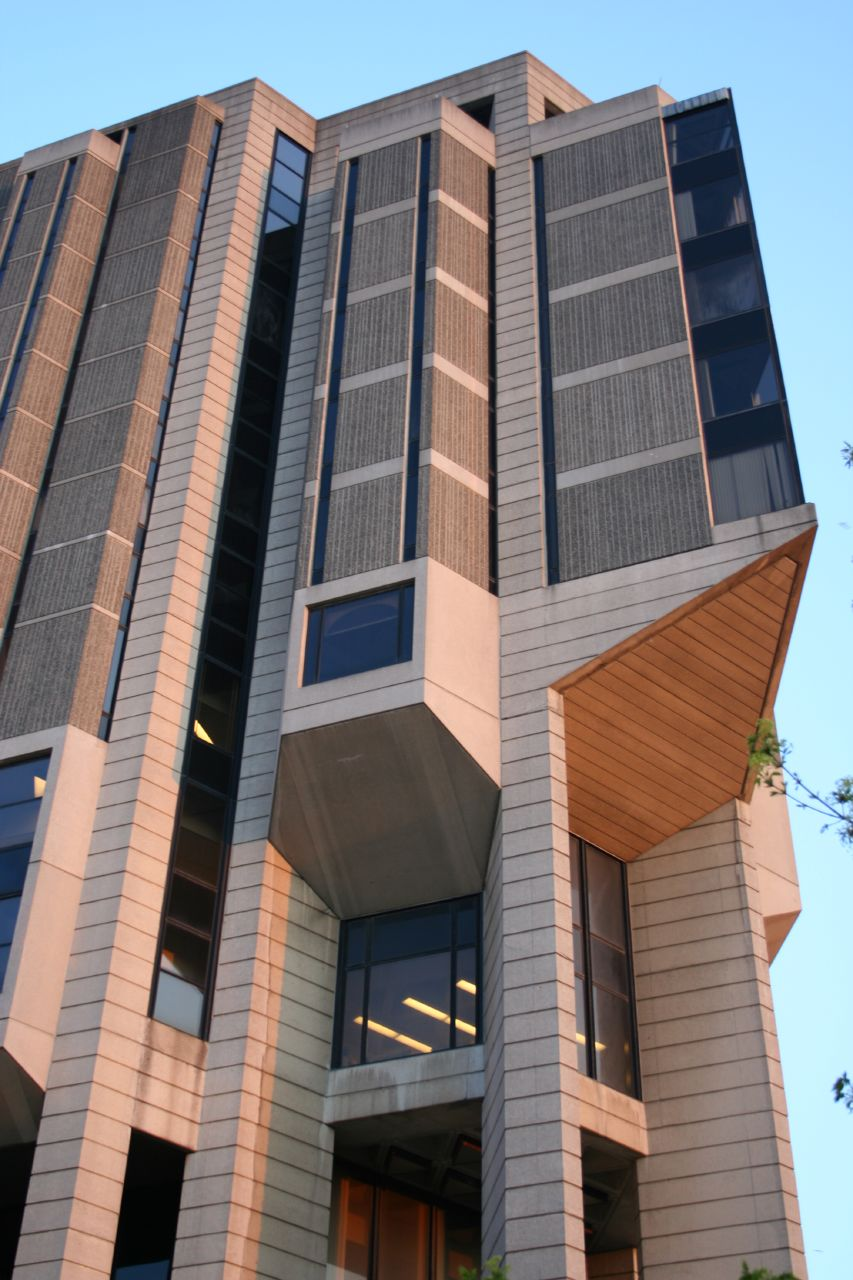
Detailed view of the upper-level exterior

The design of the Robarts Library complex was headed by Mathers & Haldenby Architects with consultation from Warner, Burns, Toan & Lunde, the New York architectural firm whose earlier works included the libraries at Cornell and Brown universities and who specialized in precast concrete buildings. Coinciding with the Canadian Centennial celebrations, the initial plan was expanded to add three more storeys to the original design. Construction of the library began in 1968 and completed in 1973, at a cost of over $40 million.

Robarts Library occupies a 3-acre (12,000 m^{2}) site on a field of open space and mature tree cover. The building rests on an equilateral triangle footprint with each side measuring 330 feet (100 m), the same length as a Canadian football field from goal post to goal post. The building is oriented such that one side of the equilateral triangle faces west while the other two sides face northeast and southeast. From the southeast corner, the building appears as a peacock.

The elevation is mostly concrete, albeit differing in textures and directionality: smooth concrete lines the façade in a horizontal manner, the rough concrete lining vertically. The steel-framed windows are situated onto the bays protruding from the façade, and are reminiscent of overhanging towers in medieval castle architecture. The bay windows seem to elevate upwards, opening up the two lowermost levels into voids enclosed with steel-framed glazing, making these elements seem lighter than they really are. To stretch further one's imagination, it is as if these elements are elevators that transport the "scholar[s] anxious to escape the noise and turmoil of the vulgar press [into]… a dream palace enshrining in its holy mysteries the power of the word."

Comprising fourteen storeys, plus two underground floors, the brutalist and futurist structure features raised podia and a suspended fourth floor. A mezzanine level physically connects Robarts Library to the Thomas Fisher Rare Book Library building at its southeastern side, and to the Claude T. Bissell Building, housing the Faculty of Information, at its northeastern side. The concrete waffle slab floor plates are adorned with triangular-patterned tessellation. A hexagonal central circulation atrium is enclosed at the core of the building and through the middle of the mezzanine level. The gross area of the building is over 1,036,000 square feet (96,200 m^{2}).

In 2008, the University of Toronto announced that Robarts Library would be receiving significant updates, the first phase of which was completed in the spring of 2011. During these years, a major transformation gradually took place at Robarts Library, beginning with the renovation of the apexes on each stack floor in 2008 (completed in 2010), the Map & Data Library on the 5th floor in 2009, the Media Commons on the 3rd floor in 2010, and the second floor porticos in 2011. The renovations were intended to create a welcoming environment that would both provide functional study spaces while also making Robarts Library's services and resources more accessible throughout the building. Interior signage was also refreshed to improve navigation and usability of the library and its resources.

=== Robarts Common ===
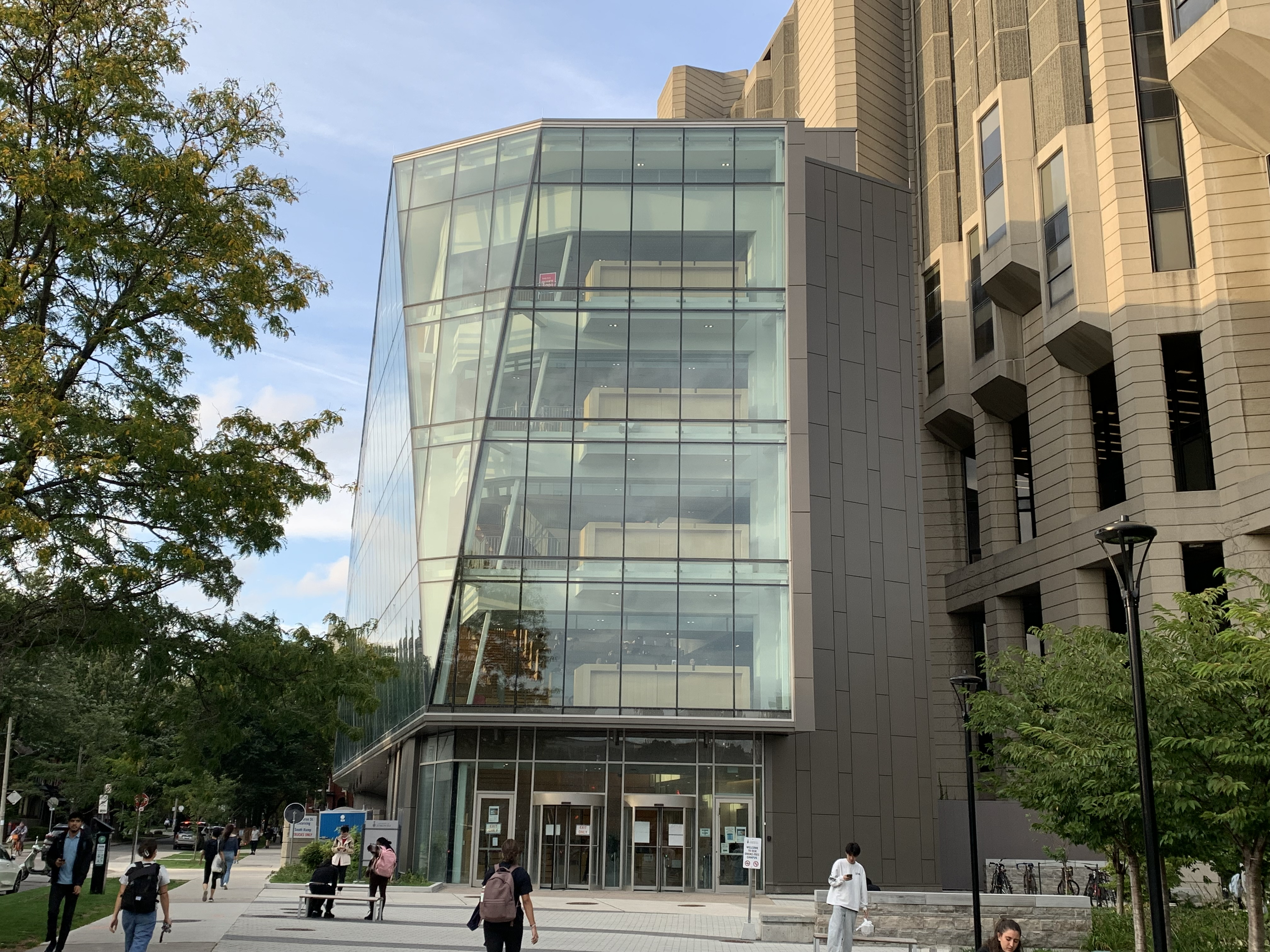
Robarts Common, an addition to the library complex opened in 2022

The next phase of the renewal was the addition of a five-storey wing on the west side of Robarts Library. This addition features a glass facade and introduced more natural light to the lower floors of the library complex, creating a more inviting and accessible study space for students. This new wing, named Robarts Common, opened in September 2022, adding 1,200 new study spaces and increased the library's total number of study spaces to over 6,000. The renovations were designed by Canadian architectural firm Diamond Schmitt Architects.

== Features and collections ==
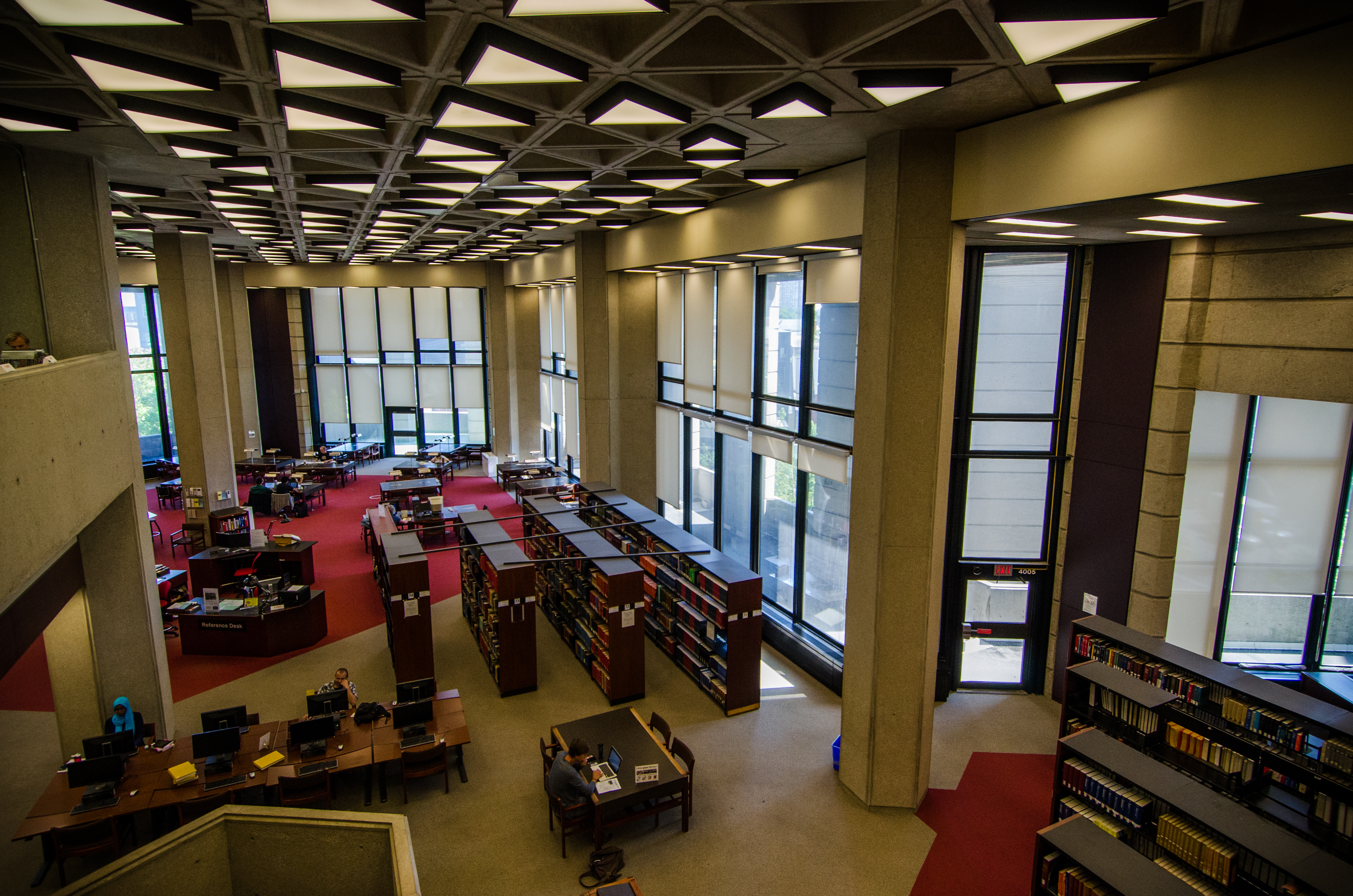
Interior of Robarts Library

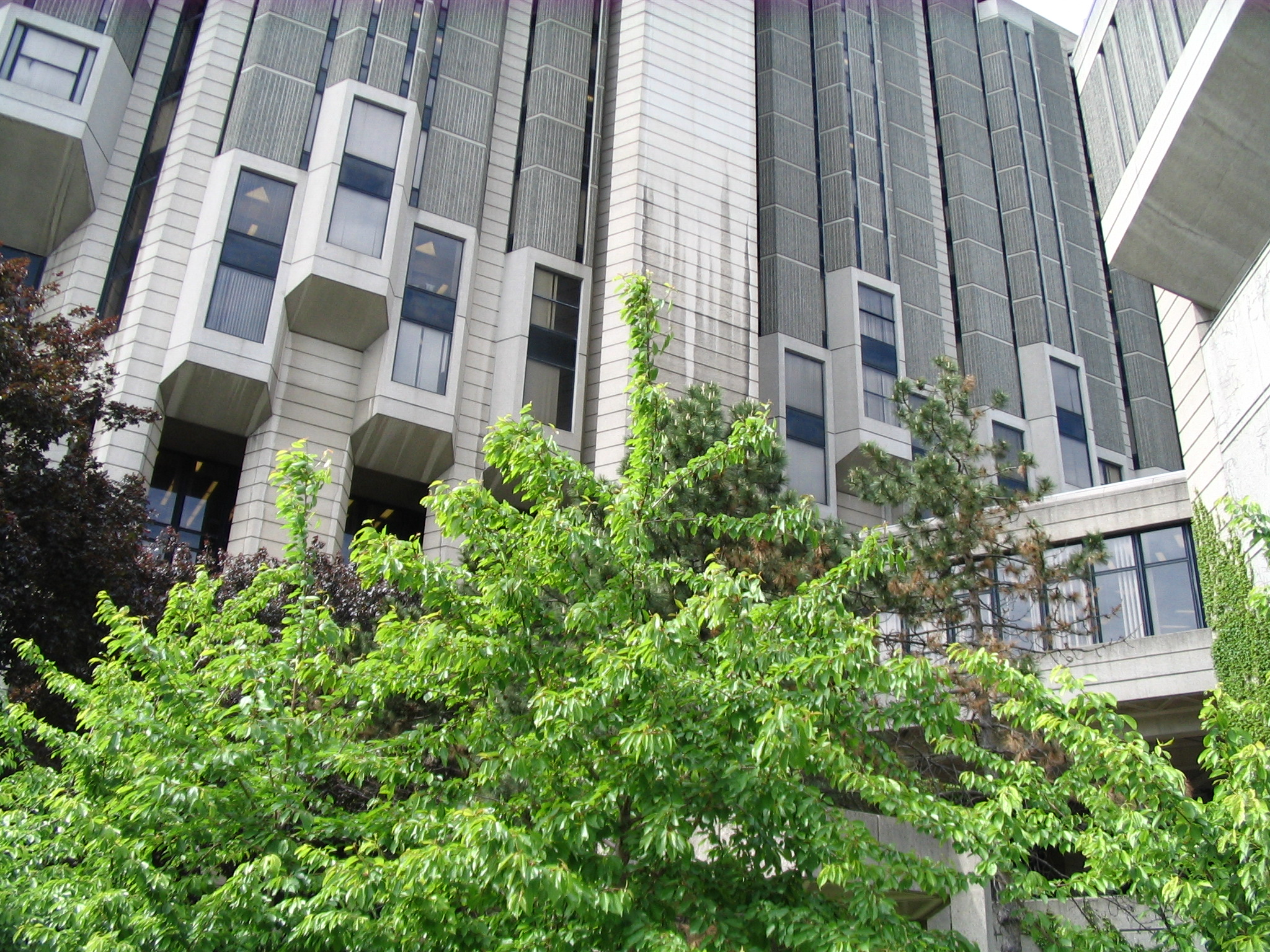
A mid-level mezzanine connects the library building with the Thomas Fisher Rare Book Library.

A 1974 article in the Canadian Architect magazine outlines the library's significance to serving a university community the size of a town, as well as by being a central storage for humankind's recorded thoughts and inspiration. The library was initially intended for use by graduate students only, but following a student protest that included an illegal occupation of the building, undergraduate students were also granted access. The library's initial design was for a mechanical book conveyor belt system to allow for faster collection by library staff, who would then send books downstairs for pickup. After Robarts was opened to all students, the conveyor system was discarded, although the tracks used by the conveyor system are still visible above the shelves. The library is open only to current University of Toronto students, faculty, and staff, external researchers, associate members, and alumni with paid privileges, as well as members of the University of Toronto Schools community. It is closed to members of the public.

The building houses a number of special collections, including the Mu Collection (Chinese: 慕氏藏書) which is a set of rare books from China in the Cheng Yu Tung East Asian Library, the largest research collection for Hong Kong and Canada-Hong Kong studies outside of Hong Kong at the Richard Charles Lee Canada-Hong Kong Library, and a sizable collection in Russian, Polish, Czech and Slovak, Ukrainian, and other East European languages at the Petro Jacyk Central & East European Resource Centre.

In addition to an extensive collection of texts, the library provides limited after-hours study space to students during the academic year with the exception of weekends. The book stacks are off-limits after hours. In August 2010, the Adaptive Technology Resource Centre moved from the first floor of Robarts Library to OCAD University, which is shared with students with disabilities from that university, as well as from nearby Toronto Metropolitan University and Seneca College.

== 2019 fecal assault incident ==
In November 2019, Robarts Library was one of three locations involved in a series of assaults perpetrated by an individual dubbed the "Pee Pee Poo Poo Man." On November 22, at roughly 5:20 p.m. ET, a trespasser entered Robarts Library and poured a bucket of liquefied feces over two patrons; similar attacks occurred in the days following at Scott Library on York University's Keele Campus and on College Street near the University of Toronto's St. George campus. On November 26, Toronto Police arrested Samuel Opoku, who was subsequently charged with five counts of assault with a weapon and five counts of mischief. Since the incident, Robarts Library requires all patrons to present their University of Toronto ID prior to entry.

== In popular culture ==
Robarts Library may have served as a model for the secret library in Umberto Eco's The Name of the Rose. Eco spent much of the time writing the novel at the University of Toronto, and the stairwell of the secret library bears a particularly strong resemblance to that in Robarts Library.

Robarts was used for exterior shots of the prison setting in Resident Evil: Afterlife. The entire building is visible numerous times, having been digitally edited and transplanted from its downtown Toronto location to Los Angeles. In the film, it has been surrounded by a prison wall and hundreds of thousands of zombies. While the exterior retains its triangular shape, the interior is rectangular.

== See also ==
- List of University of Toronto buildings
