= Thomas Fisher Rare Book Library =

Academic library at the University of Toronto

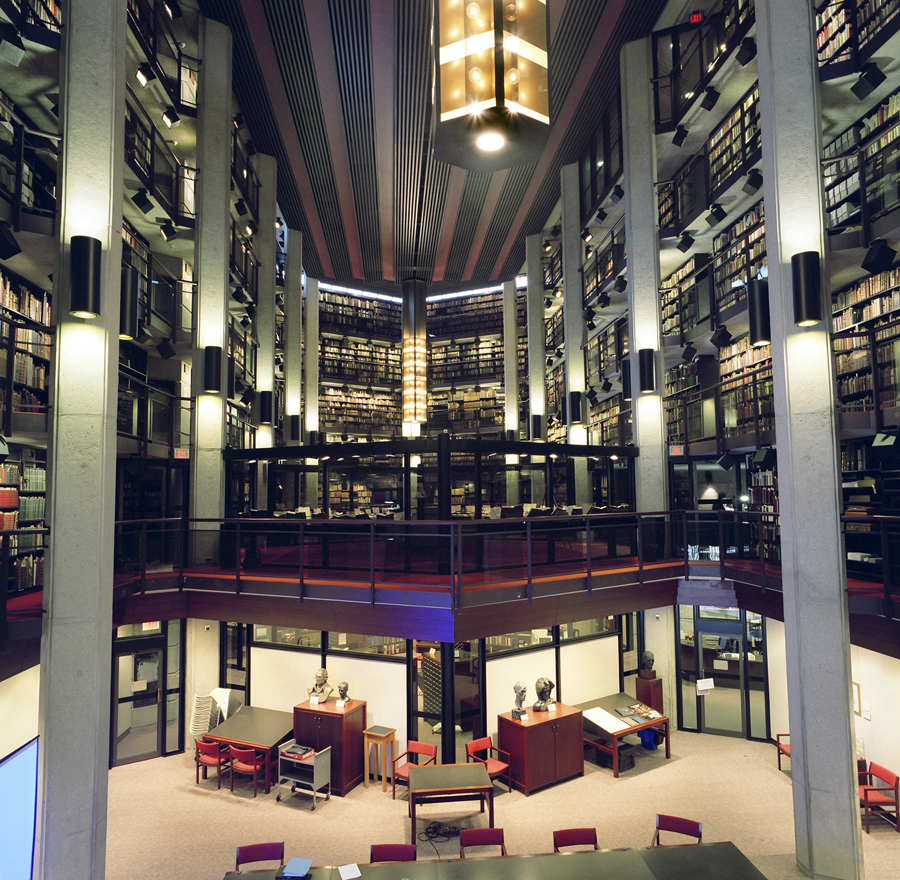
- An open atrium in the library
- 43°39′51″N 79°23′56″W
- Location: 120 St. George Street, Toronto, Ontario, Canada
- Established: 1973 (53 years ago)
- Architects: Mathers & Haldenby
- Branch of: University of Toronto Libraries

Collection
- Items collected: Rare books and manuscripts
- Size: 740,000 volume (2022), 4,000 linear metre (2022)

Other information
- Public transit access: St. George, Spadina
- Website: fisher.library.utoronto.ca

The Thomas Fisher Rare Book Library is an academic library on the St. George campus of the University of Toronto constituting the largest repository of publicly accessible rare books and manuscripts in Canada. The library is also home to the university archives which, in addition to institutional records, also contains the papers of many important Canadian literary figures including Margaret Atwood and Leonard Cohen. It is part of the Robarts Library building complex.

== History ==
The Department of Rare Books and Special Collections was founded in November 1955 by the Chief Librarian, Robert H. Blackburn. Blackburn hired Marion E. Brown who was working in the special collections department at Brown University. Brown's first responsibility was to deal with the items that had been accumulating since 1890. Some of these items in the collection included medieval manuscripts, early printed books, and special volumes of later periods that had been presented by Queen Victoria to the university. Between the accumulated items and items found in the stacks of the main library, there was enough to open up the Rare Book Room in 1957.

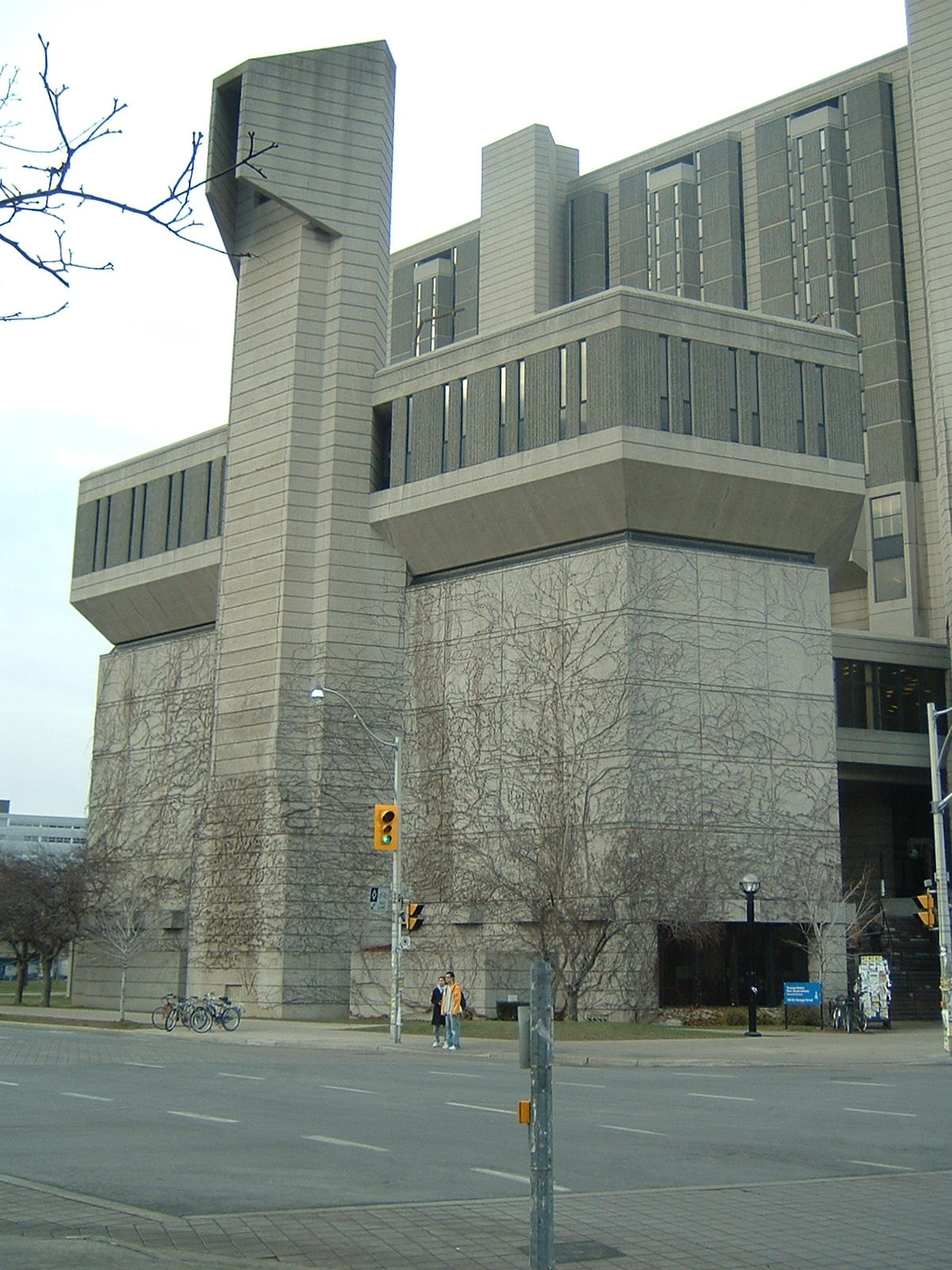
The Thomas Fisher Rare Book Library was opened in 1973, and forms a part of a larger building complex with Robarts Library.

The Department of Rare Books and Special Collections and the University Archives did not have a permanent home until 1973 when the Thomas Fisher Rare Book library was opened. The library is named in honour of Thomas Fisher (1792–1874), who immigrated from Yorkshire, settled along the Humber River in 1822, and became a successful merchant–miller. In 1973 his great-grandsons, Sidney and Charles Fisher, donated to the library their own collections of Shakespeare, various twentieth-century authors, and etchings of Wenceslaus Hollar. Since the opening of the library, it has grown to approximately 740,000 volumes and 4,000 metres of manuscript holdings.

The Fisher building was designed by Mathers and Haldenby, Toronto with design consultant Warner, Burns, Toan and Lunde, New York. It forms part of a complex with the John P. Robarts Research Library for the Humanities and Social Sciences, and the Claude Bissel Building which houses the Faculty of Information.

Richard Landon, the director until his death in 2011, organized two or three exhibitions of rare books and other materials annually.

== Collections ==
Among the collection's items are the Nuremberg Chronicle (1493), Shakespeare's First Folio (1623), and Newton's Principia (1687). Contrary to widespread internet claims, the library does not have Darwin's proof copy with annotations of On the Origin of Species (1859); it does, however, have annotated proof sheets of The Power of Movement in Plants, The Expression of the Emotions in Man and Animals, and The Effects of Cross and Self Fertilisation in the Vegetable Kingdom. Other collections include a Babylonian cuneiform tablet from Ur (1789 BC), 36 Egyptian papyrus manuscript fragments (245 BC), a Catholicon (1460) and the only Canadian copy of the Wicked Bible.

The Robert S. Kenny Collection resides in the library. This immense collection of books, documents, and other materials pertaining to the radical and labour movements, particularly in Canada, contains approximately 25,000 items collected by Robert S. Kenny, who was a member of the Communist Party of Canada. The Canadian section, which has 382 books and 768 pamphlets, was acquired by the library from Kenny in 1977. The international section of the collection was donated by Kenny in 1993.

In addition, there is a collection of etchings by Wenceslaus Hollar (1607–1677) from the collection of Sidney Thomson Fisher. The collection consists of etching plates, original prints and published works by Wenceslaus Hollar.

The library has a collection of 500 valentines.

In April 2018, it was announced that the library had acquired the oldest English-language book in Canada, and the University of Toronto Libraries' 15 millionth item, known as the Caxton Cicero, which was printed in 1481 by the Englishman William Caxton.

== Gallery ==
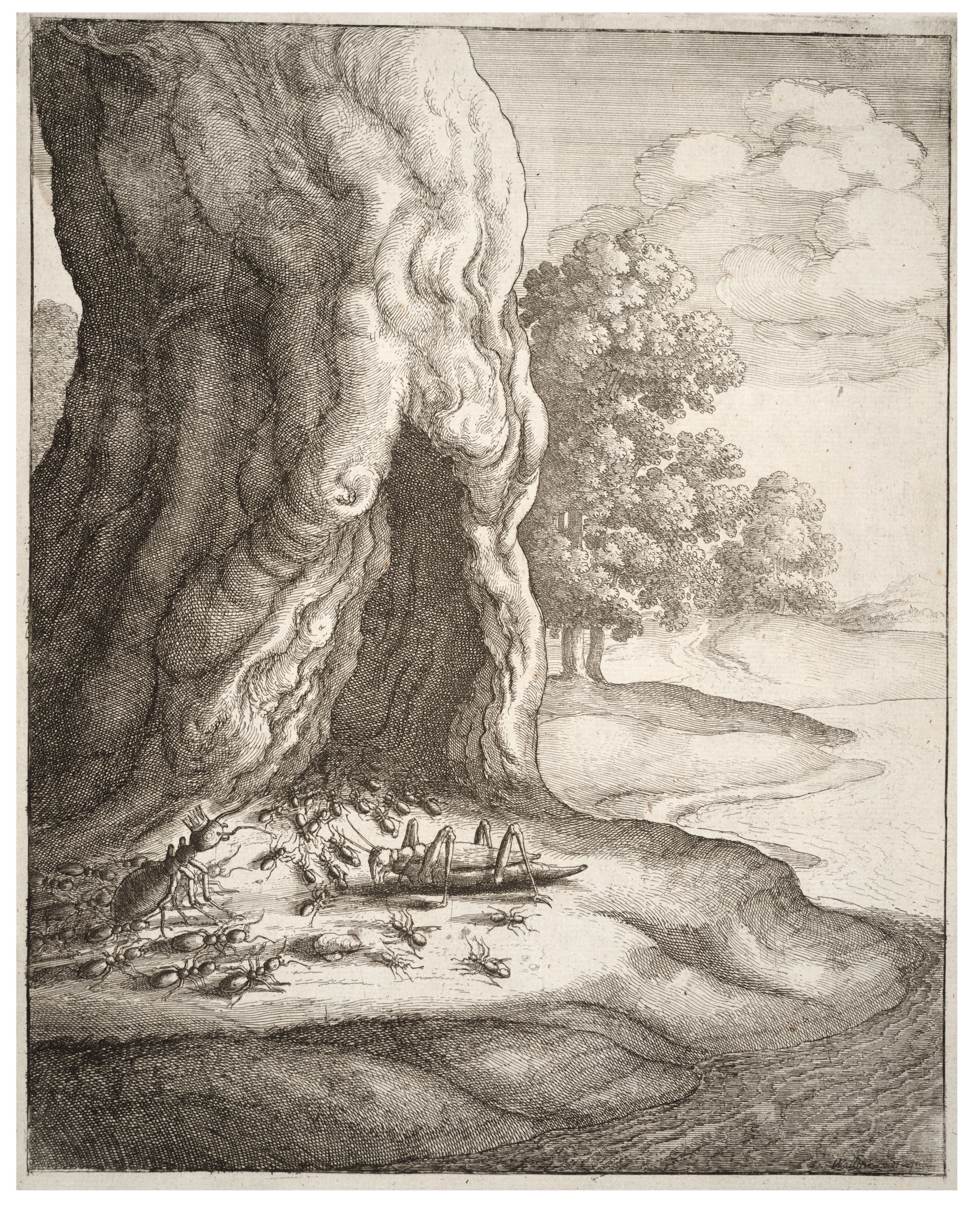
Illustration of Aesop's Fable The ant and the grasshopper by Wenzel Hollar

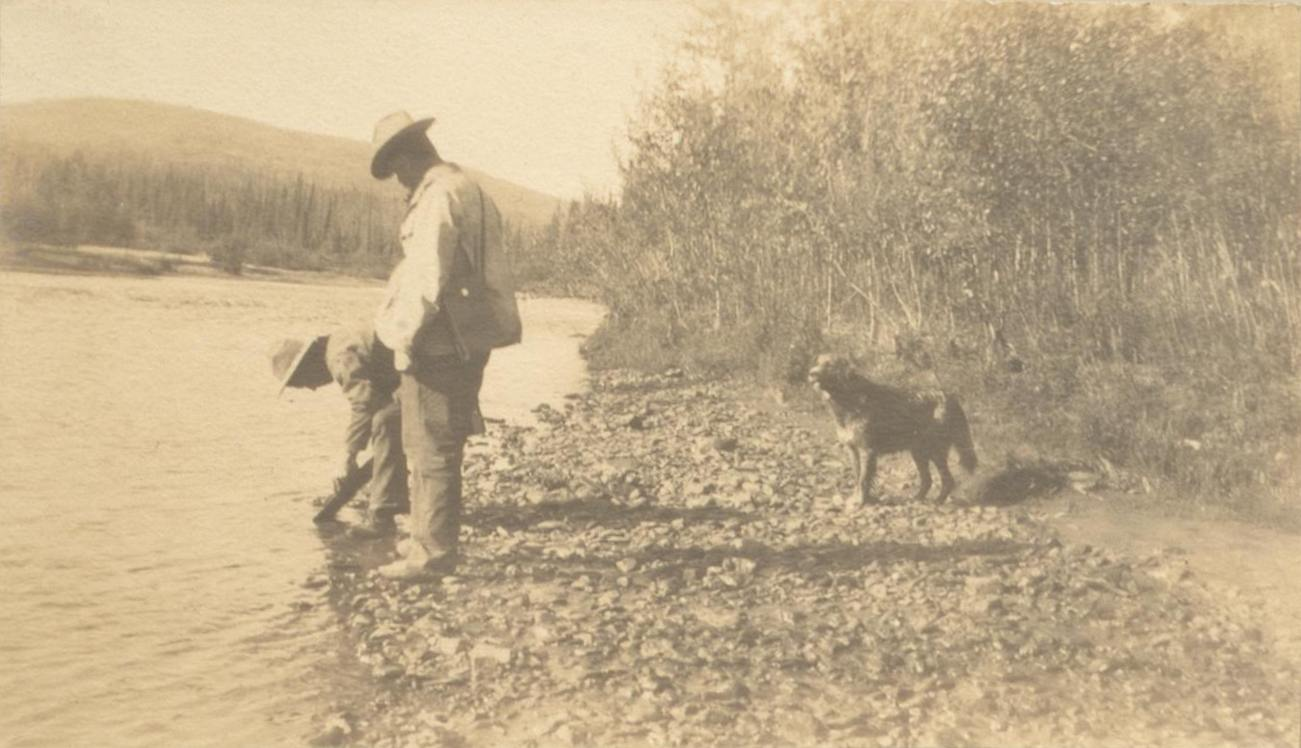
Panning for gold on the Indian River, 1904; photo by Joseph Tyrrell

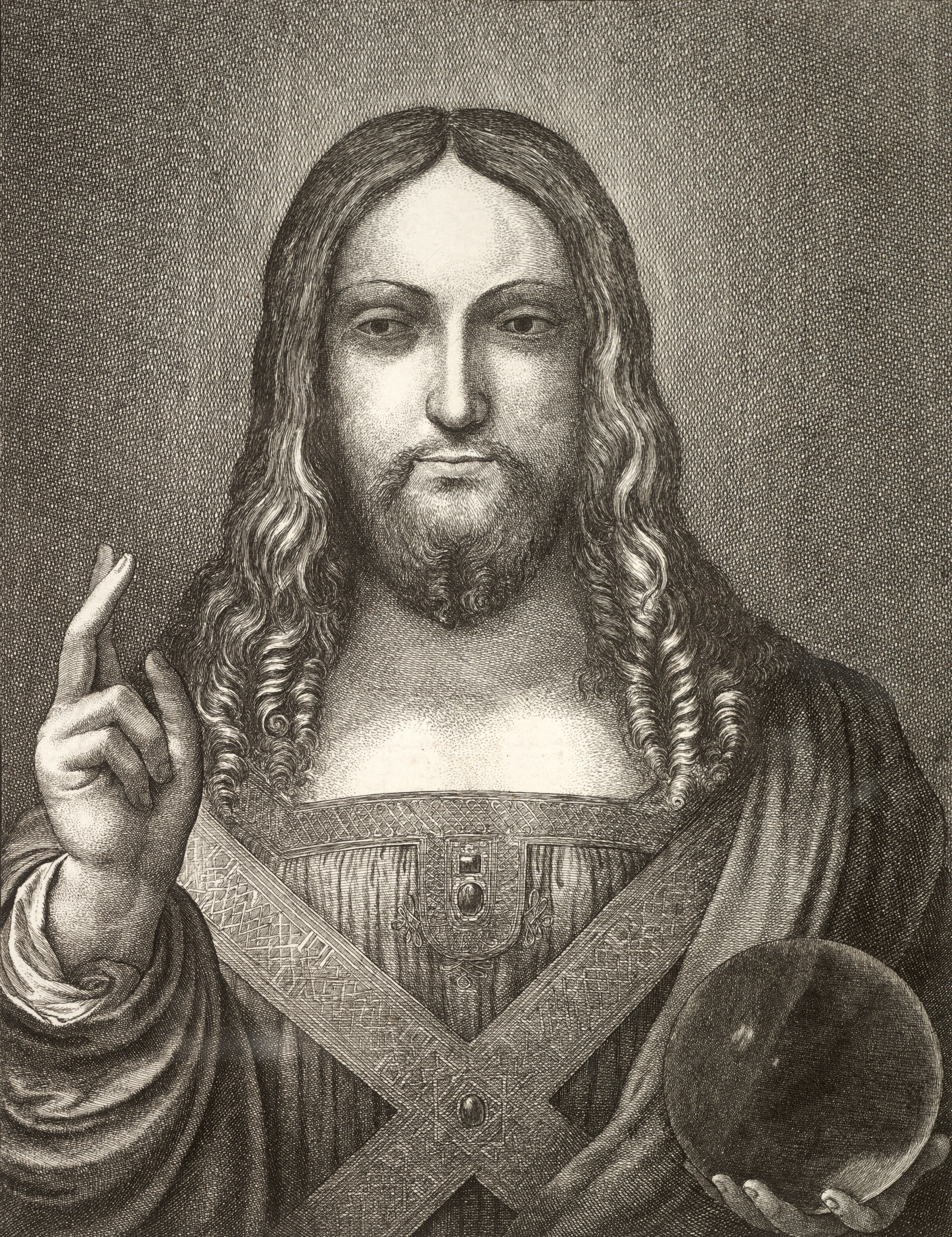
Etching by Wenceslaus Hollar (1607–1677) of the Salvator Mundi by Leonardo da Vinci

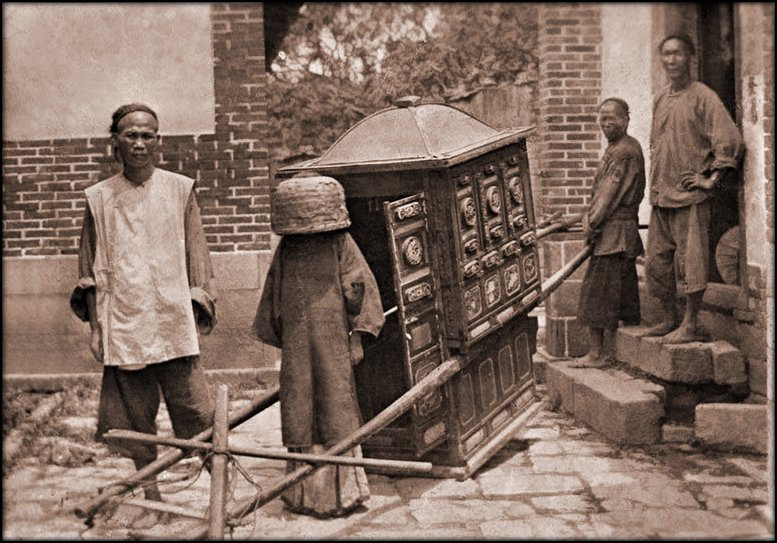
Bride On Her Way To Wedding, Fuzhou Fujian China (c. 1911-1913); Ralph G. Gold
