= University of Toronto =

Public university in Ontario, Canada

- Coat of arms
- Latin: Universitas Torontonensis
- Former names: King's College (1827–1849)
- Motto: Velut arbor ævo (Latin)
- Motto in English: "As a tree through the ages"
- Type: Public research university
- Established: March 15, 1827 (199 years ago)
- Academic affiliations: AAU; ACU; COU; IAU; U15; UArctic; Universities Canada
- Endowment: c. CA$3.62 billion; (c. CA$4.49 billion incl. federated universities)
- Budget: CA$3.66 billion (2026–2027)
- Chancellor: Wes Hall
- President: Melanie Woodin
- Provost: L. Trevor Young
- Faculty: 16,503 (Note: This figure is for the university as a whole. For individual data on its three campuses, St. George, Mississauga, and Scarborough, refer to the respective articles.)
- Administrative staff: 9,812
- Students: 103,140
- Undergraduates: 81,412
- Postgraduates: 21,728
- Location: Toronto and Mississauga, Ontario, Canada; 43°39′42″N 79°23′42″W
- Campuses: St. George: large city, 182 acres (74 ha); Mississauga: suburban, 225 acres (91 ha); Scarborough: suburban, 300 acres (120 ha)
- Newspaper: The Varsity
- Colours: U of T Blue
- Nickname: Varsity Blues
- Sporting affiliations: U Sports – OUA, CUFLA
- Mascot: True Blue
- Website: utoronto.ca

The University of Toronto (U of T) is a public research university with three main campuses in Toronto and Mississauga, Ontario, Canada. It is the oldest institution of higher learning in Ontario, founded by royal charter in 1827 as King's College. Originally controlled by the Church of England, the university assumed its present name in 1850 upon becoming a secular institution.

The University of Toronto operates as a single institution across three campuses in the Greater Toronto Area, known as St. George, Mississauga, and Scarborough. The university's large downtown Toronto location, St. George, is the oldest of the three and comprises several colleges, each with varying autonomy over financial and institutional affairs and significant differences in character and history. Its suburban campuses in the former city of Scarborough to the east and city of Mississauga to the west were established in the 1960s, and together make up nearly half of the university's undergraduate student body.

With more than 100,000 students enrolled and over 720,000 alumni, the University of Toronto is the largest post-secondary institution in Canada. It offers over 700 undergraduate and 200 graduate programs. The university receives the most annual scientific research funding and endowment of any Canadian university. It is also one of two members of the Association of American Universities outside the United States, alongside McGill University in Montreal. Academically, the University of Toronto is noted for influential movements and curricula in literary criticism and communication theory, known collectively as the Toronto School.

The university was the birthplace of insulin, stem cell research, the first artificial cardiac pacemaker, and the site of the first successful lung transplant and nerve transplant. The university was also home to the first electron microscope, the development of deep learning, neural networks, multi-touch technology, the identification of the first black hole Cygnus X-1, and the development of the theory of NP-completeness. The University of Toronto is the recipient of both the single largest philanthropic gift in Canadian history, a CA$250 million donation from James and Louise Temerty in 2020, and the largest ever research grant in Canada, a CA$200 million grant from the Government of Canada in 2023.

The Varsity Blues represent the university in intercollegiate league matches, primarily within U Sports, with ties to gridiron football, rowing and ice hockey. The earliest recorded instance of gridiron football was at University of Toronto's University College in November 1861. The university's Hart House is an early example of the North American student centre, simultaneously serving cultural, intellectual, and recreational interests within its large Gothic-revival complex.

As of 2026, 12 Nobel laureates, 6 Turing Award winners, 100 Rhodes Scholars, and 1 Fields Medalist have been affiliated with the university. University of Toronto alumni additionally include five prime ministers of Canada (including William Lyon Mackenzie King and Lester B. Pearson), three governors general of Canada, nine foreign leaders, seventeen justices of the Supreme Court of Canada, and eight mayors of Toronto.

== History ==
=== Early history ===
The founding of a colonial college had long been the desire of John Graves Simcoe, the first Lieutenant-Governor of Upper Canada and founder of York, the colonial capital. As an Oxford-educated military commander who had fought in the American Revolutionary War, Simcoe believed a college was needed to counter the spread of republicanism from the United States. The Upper Canada Executive Committee recommended in 1798 that a college be established in York.

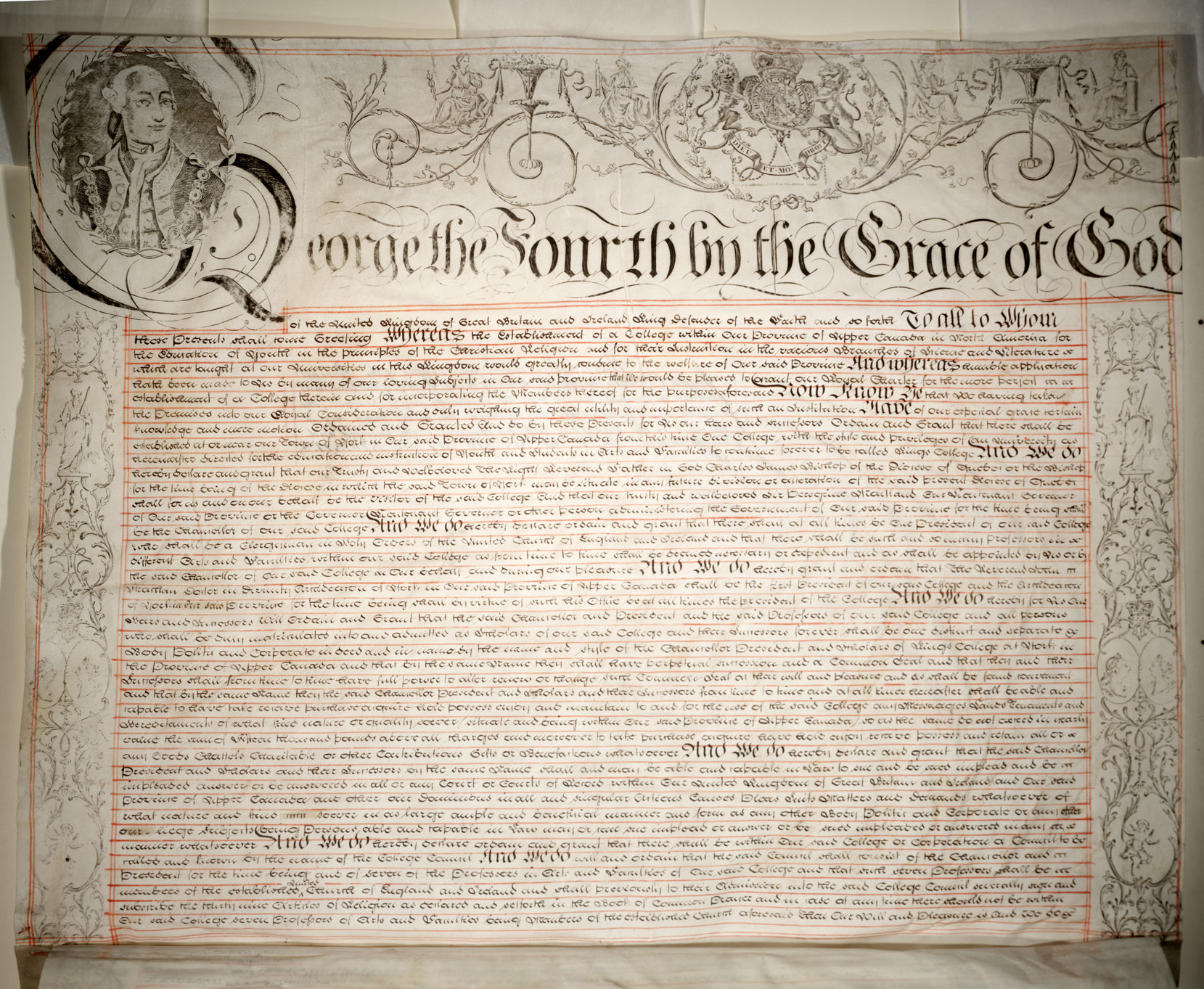
Charter granted by King George IV in 1827, establishing King's College.

On March 15, 1827, a royal charter was formally issued by King George IV, proclaiming "from this time one College, with the style and privileges of a University … for the education of youth in the principles of the Christian Religion, and for their instruction in the various branches of Science and Literature … to continue for ever, to be called King's College." The granting of the charter was largely the result of intense lobbying by John Strachan, the influential future first Anglican Bishop of Toronto who took office as the college's first president. King's College was designated the provincial university of Upper Canada, allowing other institutions to affiliate or join its federation. The original three-storey Greek Revival school building was built on the present site of Queen's Park.

Under Strachan's stewardship, King's College was a religious institution closely aligned with the Church of England and the British colonial elite, known as the Family Compact. Reformist politicians opposed the clergy's control over colonial institutions and fought to have the college secularized. In 1849, after a lengthy and heated debate, the newly elected responsible government of the Province of Canada voted to rename King's College as the University of Toronto and severed the school's ties with the church, given that York was renamed Toronto upon the city's incorporation in 1834. Having anticipated this decision, the enraged Strachan had resigned a year earlier to open Trinity College as a private Anglican seminary. University College was created as the University of Toronto's nondenominational teaching branch, designated the provincial college. During the American Civil War, the threat of Union blockade on British North America prompted the creation of the University Rifle Corps, which saw battle in resisting the Fenian raids on the Niagara border in 1866. The Corps was part of the Reserve Militia led by professor Henry Croft.

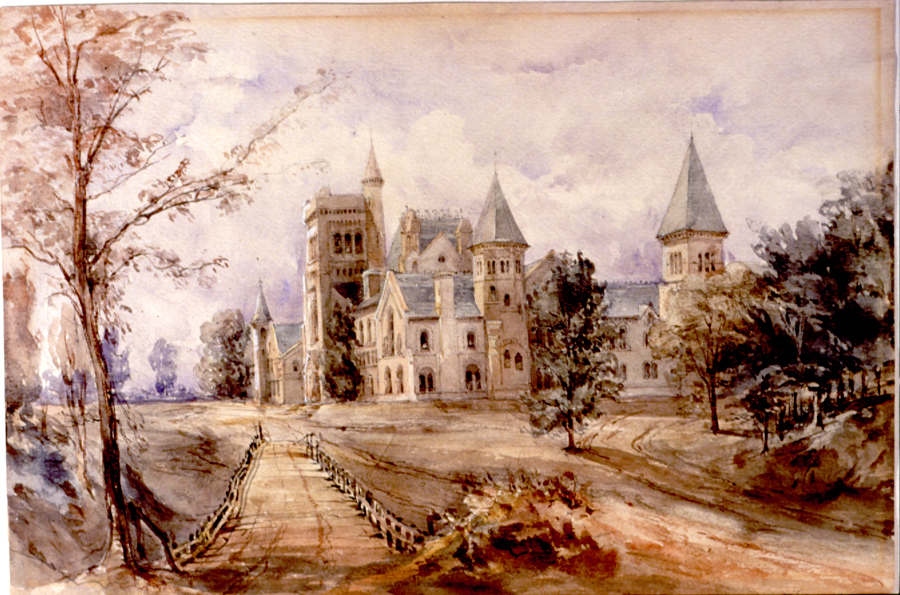
Painting of University College, 1859.

Established in 1878, the School of Practical Science was the precursor to the Faculty of Applied Science and Engineering, which has been nicknamed Skule since its earliest days. While the Temerty Faculty of Medicine opened in 1843, medical teaching was conducted by proprietary schools from 1853 until 1887 when the faculty absorbed the Toronto School of Medicine. Meanwhile, the university continued to set examinations and confer medical degrees. The university opened the Faculty of Law in 1887, followed by the Faculty of Dentistry in 1888 when the Royal College of Dental Surgeons became an affiliate. Women were first admitted to the university in 1884.

A devastating fire in 1890 gutted the interior of University College and destroyed 33,000 volumes from its library, but the university restored the building and replenished its library within two years. Over the next two decades, a collegiate system took shape as the university arranged federation with several ecclesiastical colleges, including Strachan's Trinity College in 1904. The university operated the Royal Conservatory of Music from 1896 to 1991 and the Royal Ontario Museum from 1912 to 1968; both still retain close ties with the university as independent institutions. The University of Toronto Press was founded in 1901 as Canada's first academic publishing house. The Faculty of Forestry (now part of the Daniels Faculty), founded in 1907 with Bernhard Fernow as dean, was Canada's first university faculty devoted to forest science. In 1910, the Faculty of Education opened its laboratory school, the University of Toronto Schools.

=== World wars and post-war years ===
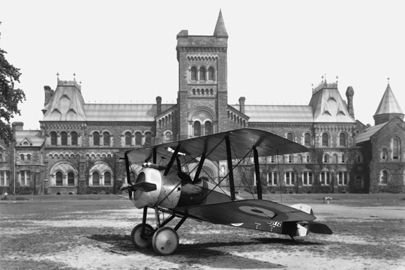
A Sopwith Camel aircraft rests on the Front Campus lawn in 1918.

The First and Second World Wars curtailed some university activities as undergraduate and graduate men eagerly enlisted. Intercollegiate athletic competitions and the Hart House Debates were suspended, although exhibition and interfaculty games were still held. The David Dunlap Observatory in Richmond Hill opened in 1935, followed by the University of Toronto Institute for Aerospace Studies in 1949. By the 1961–62 academic year, the university had a total enrolment of 14,302 students, including 1,531 graduate students.

The university opened its second campus, then known as Scarborough College in 1964, and third campus, then known as Erindale College shortly after in 1967. The university's former affiliated schools at the Ontario Agricultural College and Glendon Hall became fully independent of the University of Toronto and became part of University of Guelph in 1964 and York University in 1965, respectively. Beginning in the 1980s, reductions in government funding prompted more rigorous fundraising efforts.

=== Since 2000 ===
The University of Toronto was the first Canadian university to amass a financial endowment greater than one billion dollars in 2007. From 2011 to 2018, the university embarked on the Boundless fundraising campaign, which concluded in 2018 at CA$2.641 billion raised, setting a new all-time fundraising record in Canada.

In 2000, geophysicist Kin-Yip Chun was reinstated as a professor of the university, after he launched an unsuccessful lawsuit against the university alleging racial discrimination. In 2017, a human rights application was filed against the university by one of its students for allegedly delaying the investigation of sexual assault and being dismissive of their concerns.

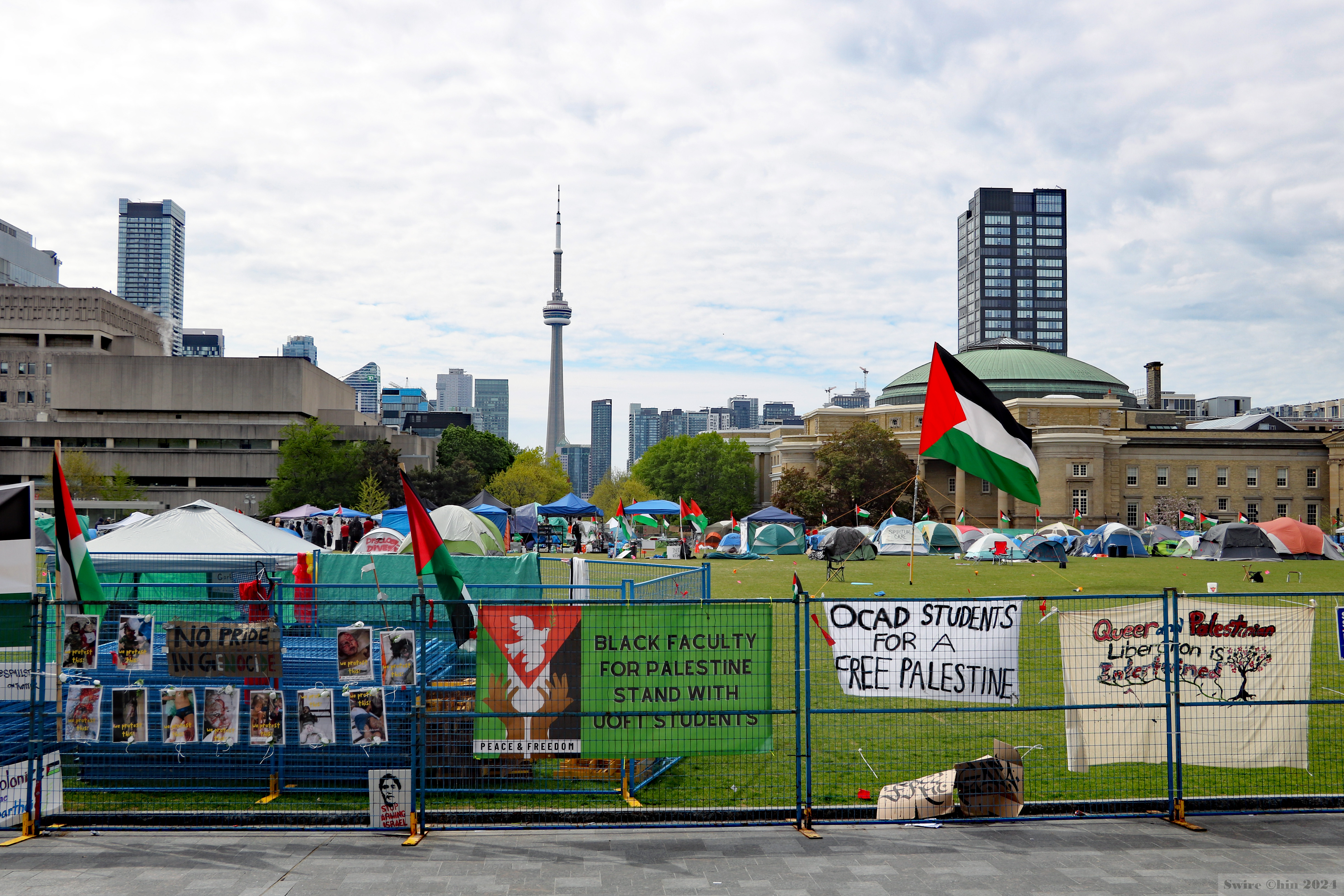
University of Toronto pro-Palestinian encampment on May 10, 2024

In 2018, the university cleared one of its professors of allegations of discrimination and antisemitism in an internal investigation, after a complaint was filed by one of its students. A 2022 antisemitism working group reported that systemic discrimination is present on campus, including antisemitism, but that the university's existing anti-discrimination policies are sufficient to address antisemitism, recommending against the adoption of the IHRA working definition of antisemitism. In May 2024, a Palestine solidarity encampment was established on King's College Circle, demanding that the university disclose all of its investments, divest from entities complicit in genocide, and cut ties with institutions that are complicity with genocide and apartheid. Participants at the encampment reflected the campus community, including Palestinian and Jewish students, faculty members, and staff. The university administration sought an injunction to remove the encampment from the university grounds. Justice Markus Koehnen from the Ontario Superior Court granted the injunction, noting in his judgment that there was no evidence of antisemitic or violent conduct by the encampment participants, but citing private property as the reason for granting the injunction.

In 2020, Dr Valentina Azarova accepted an offer from the university for the position of the International Human Rights Program at the law faculty. The offer was rescinded suddenly by the university, and it was later revealed that the it was rescinded following pressure by an Ontario judge and major donor David Spiro, who objected to Dr Azarova's scholarship on Israeli human rights violations. The Canadian Association of University Teachers identified this intervention as a severe threat to academic freedom, and issued a censure against the university. The administration eventually reinstated the offer, and CAUT lifted the censure. As a result, the university expanded its donor policy, but in the following year, it was revealed that the university had accepted US$450,000 from Amazon to the law faculty for research and discussion on competition. This was again seen as a violation of academic freedom, almost resulting in another CAUT censure, resulting in the university returning the donation to Amazon.

On September 24, 2020, the university announced the single largest donation in Canadian history, a CA$250 million gift to the Faculty of Medicine from Toronto-based philanthropists James and Louise Temerty. This broke the previous record for the school set in 2019 when Onex CEO Gerry Schwartz and his wife, Indigo CEO Heather Reisman, jointly donated $100 million for the creation of a 70,000-square-metre (750,000 sq ft) innovation and artificial intelligence centre known as the Schwartz Reisman Innovation Campus. The Faculty of Medicine has been renamed the Temerty Faculty of Medicine in their honour.

In December 2021, the University of Toronto announced the launch of the Defy Gravity campaign, the largest fundraising campaign in Canadian history, with a goal of raising CA$4 billion for the university.

In August 2025, the university announced the launch of the Lawson Climate Institute, aimed at fostering interdisciplinary research and policy development on climate change. The institute's stated mission is to connect scholars, policymakers, and community leaders to advance solutions for reducing greenhouse gas emissions and adapting to impacts of climate change in Toronto and beyond. Initial funding for the Climate Institute was provided through university resources, with plans to seek additional support from public and private partners.

== Campuses and locations ==
The University of Toronto's three main campuses within the Greater Toronto Area.

The University of Toronto describes itself as one university with three campuses. All located within the Greater Toronto Area, each campus has a unique learning environment while sharing faculty and central governance. The St. George campus is the university's historic central location in downtown Toronto, with the smaller Scarborough and Mississauga campuses established in the 1960s, set in Toronto's eastern former city of Scarborough and the neighbouring city of Mississauga respectively. St. George is noted for its urban location and mix of Gothic Revival and Neoclassical architecture, while a blend of Brutalist and contemporary buildings in more nature-oriented, suburban settings characterize the Scarborough and Mississauga campuses.

=== St. George ===
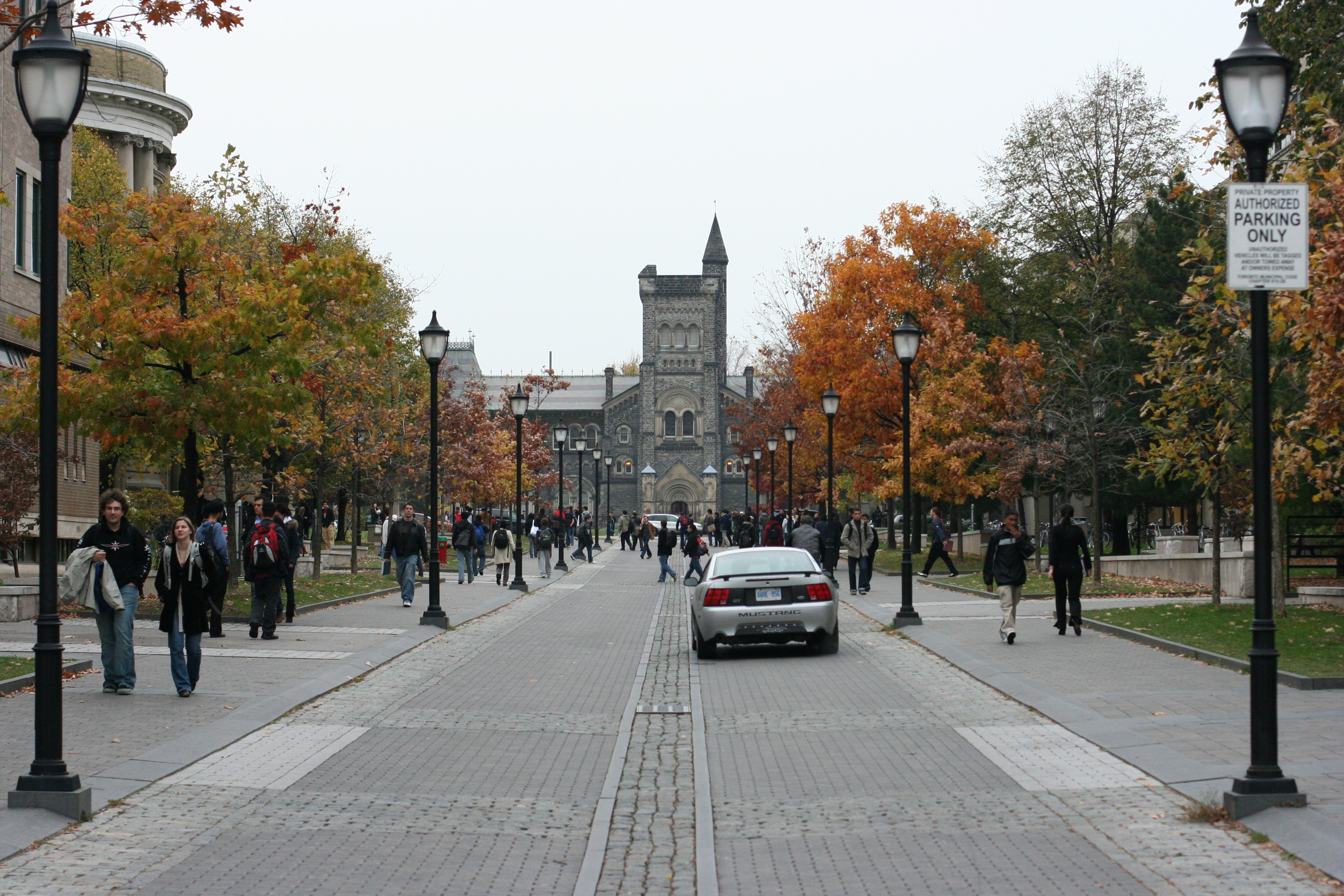
The St. George campus has the largest student population of the three and is home to the college system. It is located in downtown Toronto.

The University of Toronto's St. George campus is its oldest and largest location, situated on the grounds that surround Queen's Park in downtown Toronto. It is home to the university's central administration, collegiate system, as well as most of its academic divisions, the largest of which is the Faculty of Arts and Science. St. George is highly decentralized and composed of several smaller communities, such as its colleges and professional faculties. The grounds lie partially within the University neighbourhood, about 2 kilometres (1.2 mi) north of downtown's Financial District, immediately north of Chinatown and the Discovery District, and immediately south of the neighbourhoods of Yorkville and The Annex. The site encompasses 73.6 hectares (182 acres) bounded mostly by Bay Street to the east, Bloor Street to the north, Spadina Avenue to the west and College Street to the south. An enclave surrounded by the university grounds, Queen's Park contains the Ontario Legislative Building and several historic monuments. With its green spaces and many interlocking courtyards, the St. George campus forms a distinct region of urban parkland in the city's downtown core. The namesake University Avenue is a ceremonial boulevard and arterial thoroughfare that runs through downtown between Queen's Park and Front Street. Several Toronto subway stations are nearby, including St. George, Museum and Queen's Park, with Spadina and St. Patrick stations a short distance away. The name St. George is a retronym taken from St. George Street, a road that divides the campus from north to south.

=== Mississauga ===
The Mississauga campus is located on 225 acres of protected forest to the west of Toronto.

The University of Toronto maintains a large suburban campus in the city of Mississauga, approximately 33 kilometres (21 mi) southwest of the downtown St. George campus. The Mississauga campus was established in 1967 as Erindale College, one of the university's two colleges located outside of Toronto at the time. Following rapid growth of its student population in the 2000s, the campus became its own academic division and has since expanded to become the university's second-largest division overall, as well as a hub for business and innovation in the Peel Region as one of its only university locations. The campus is known for its proximity to nature, located on the bank of the Credit River on 225 acres (91 ha) of protected forested land. In 2011, the Temerty Faculty of Medicine – in partnership with the Trillium Health Partners system of hospitals – established the Mississauga Academy of Medicine, one of the academies in its MD Program. The academy is based in the Terrence Donnelly Health Sciences Complex on the Mississauga campus.

=== Scarborough ===
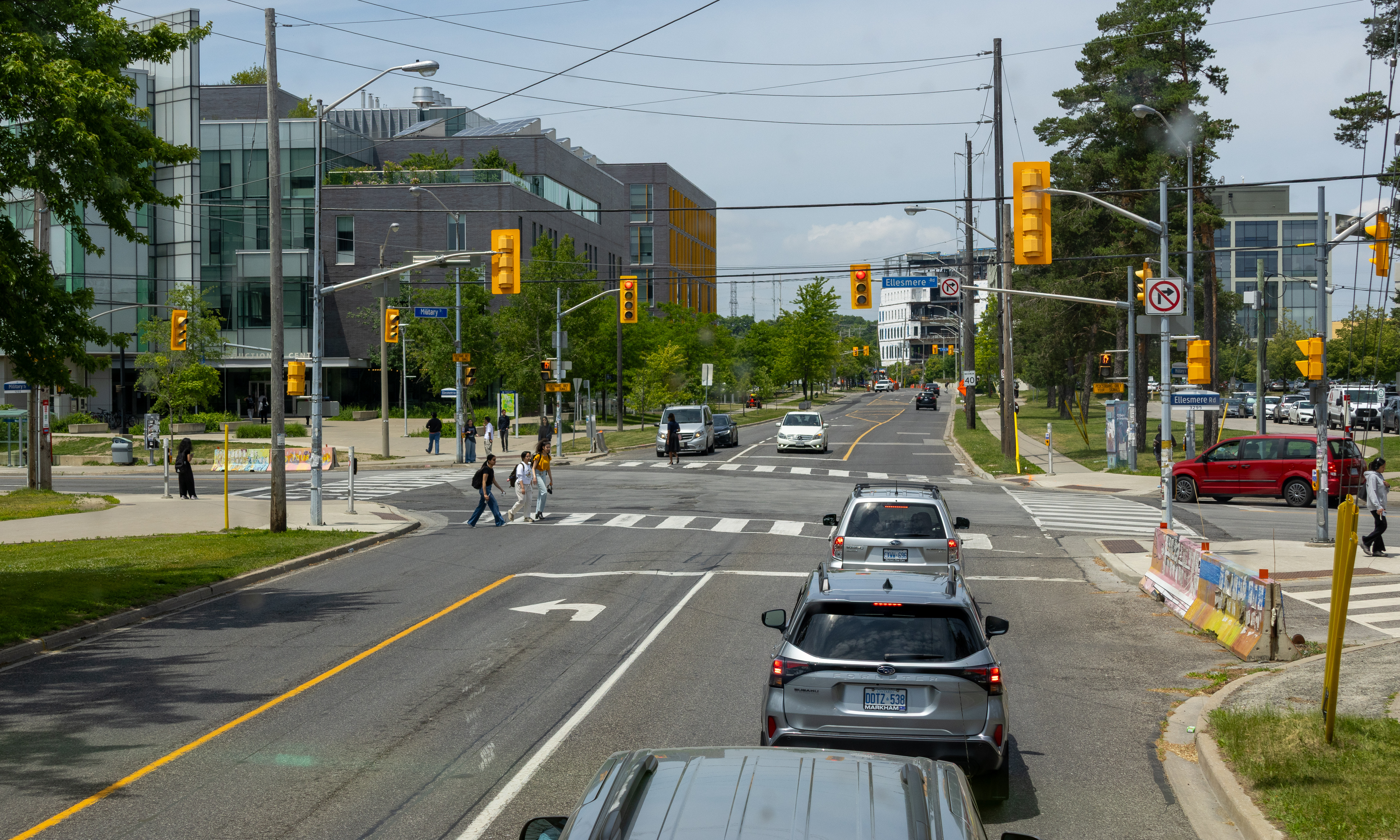
The Scarborough campus houses the most extensive co-op programs at the university, located in eastern Toronto.

The Scarborough campus was opened in 1964 as Scarborough College. It is located on 300 acres (120 ha) in Scarborough, a suburban former city in eastern Toronto. At the time of the campus's founding, Scarborough was an independent municipality east of Toronto, but has since been amalgamated into the city. The campus established the first co-operative education in Ontario and continues to be a major provider of co-op for the university, in addition to offering unique double-degree programs. In partnership with the City of Toronto, the university operates the Toronto Pan Am Sports Centre, a sports complex open to students and the public.

=== Other locations ===
In addition to its three main campuses, the University of Toronto Institute for Aerospace Studies (UTIAS), part of the Faculty of Applied Science and Engineering, has maintained a satellite campus in North York since 1960. The Koffler Scientific Reserve is the university's biological field station, which occupies approximately 348 hectares (860 acres) of fields, wetlands, grasslands, and forest on the edge of the Oak Ridges Moraine in King Township. University of Toronto Camp is a facility on Gull Lake near Minden used to teach engineering students surveying and project management. The 71-hectare (175-acre) property has been owned by the university since 1919.

Hart House Farm is a 61-hectare (150-acre) plot of land in Caledon managed by Hart House since 1949. The farmhouse and its facilities have been used for student recreation and co-curricular activities. Since 2019, the university has explored ways to expand its use as a site for Indigenous students to connect and foster community. The land lies on the territory of the Mississaugas of the Credit First Nation along the Niagara Escarpment.

== Organization and administration ==
=== Governance ===
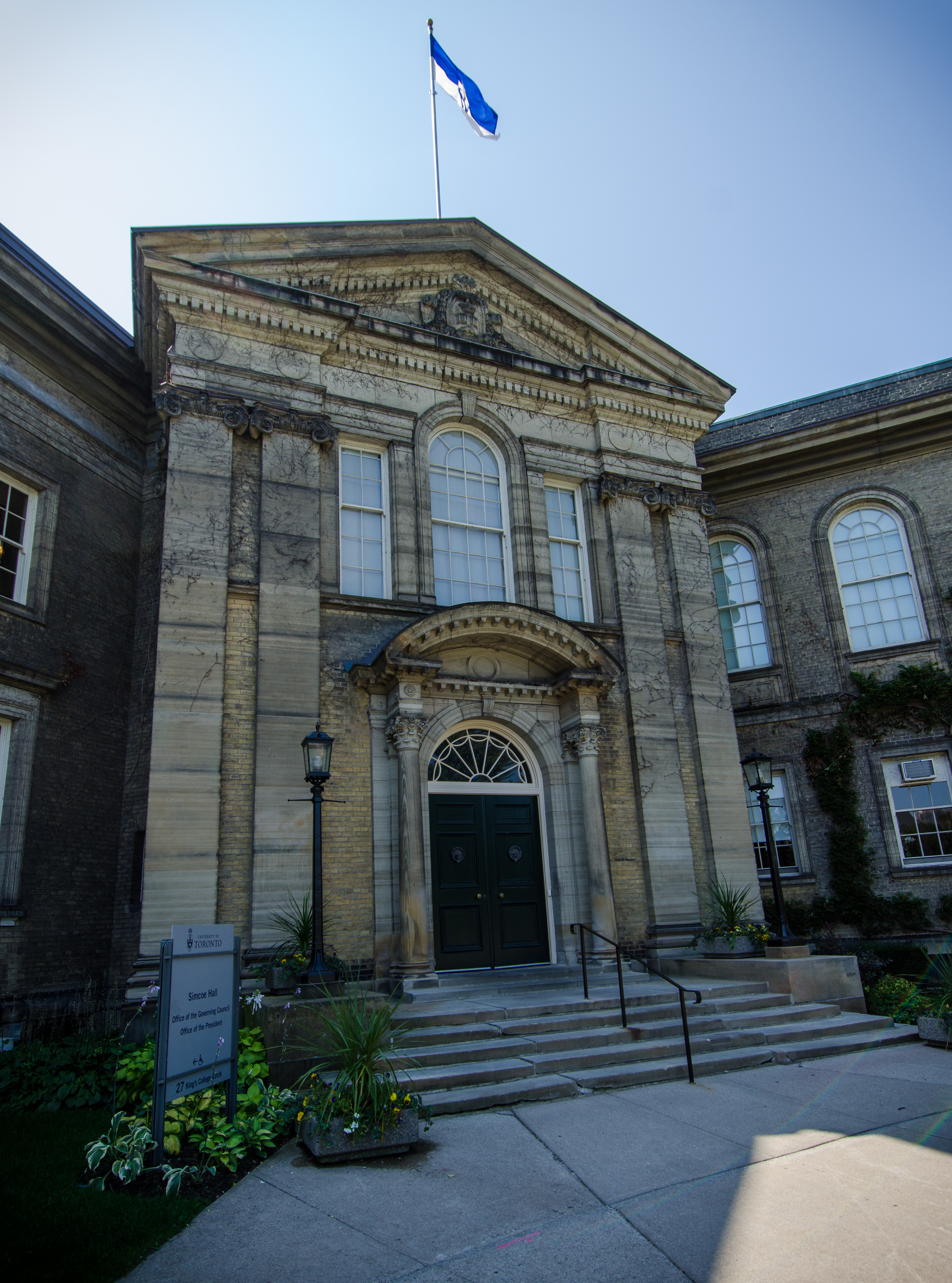
Simcoe Hall, which houses the university's central administration and Governing Council.

The chancellor, usually a former governor general, lieutenant governor, premier or diplomat, is the ceremonial head of the university. The president of the University of Toronto is appointed by the Governing Council as the chief executive of the university. There are numerous vice-presidents that serve on the president's leadership team. Among them, one is cross-appointed as the university provost and two as the principals of the Mississauga campus and Scarborough campus, respectively.

All three University of Toronto campuses, while separate in location, are part of a single university governed by one central administration. The University of Toronto Governing Council is the university's unicameral legislative organ, overseeing general academic, business and institutional affairs with control over the institution's academic divisions, campuses, and constituent colleges. However, its federated colleges and universities (which began as independent institutions) retain significant autonomy, possessing their own governing bodies and financial endowments.

The Governing Council was established through the University of Toronto Act, 1971, which superseded the standard two-tiered administrative structure for Canadian universities set out by The University Act, 1906. From 1906 to 1971, the university was governed under a bicameral system composed of the board of governors and the university senate. Based in Simcoe Hall on the St. George campus, the Governing Council consists of 50 members, including the president and chancellor as ex officio members, and the rest elected in groups by the Lieutenant Governor in Council, university alumni, teaching staff, and students. Within the council and executive committee is the Academic Board, which consists of various faculty councils, as well as the Business Board, University Affairs Board, Mississauga Campus Council, and Scarborough Campus Council.

=== Colleges ===
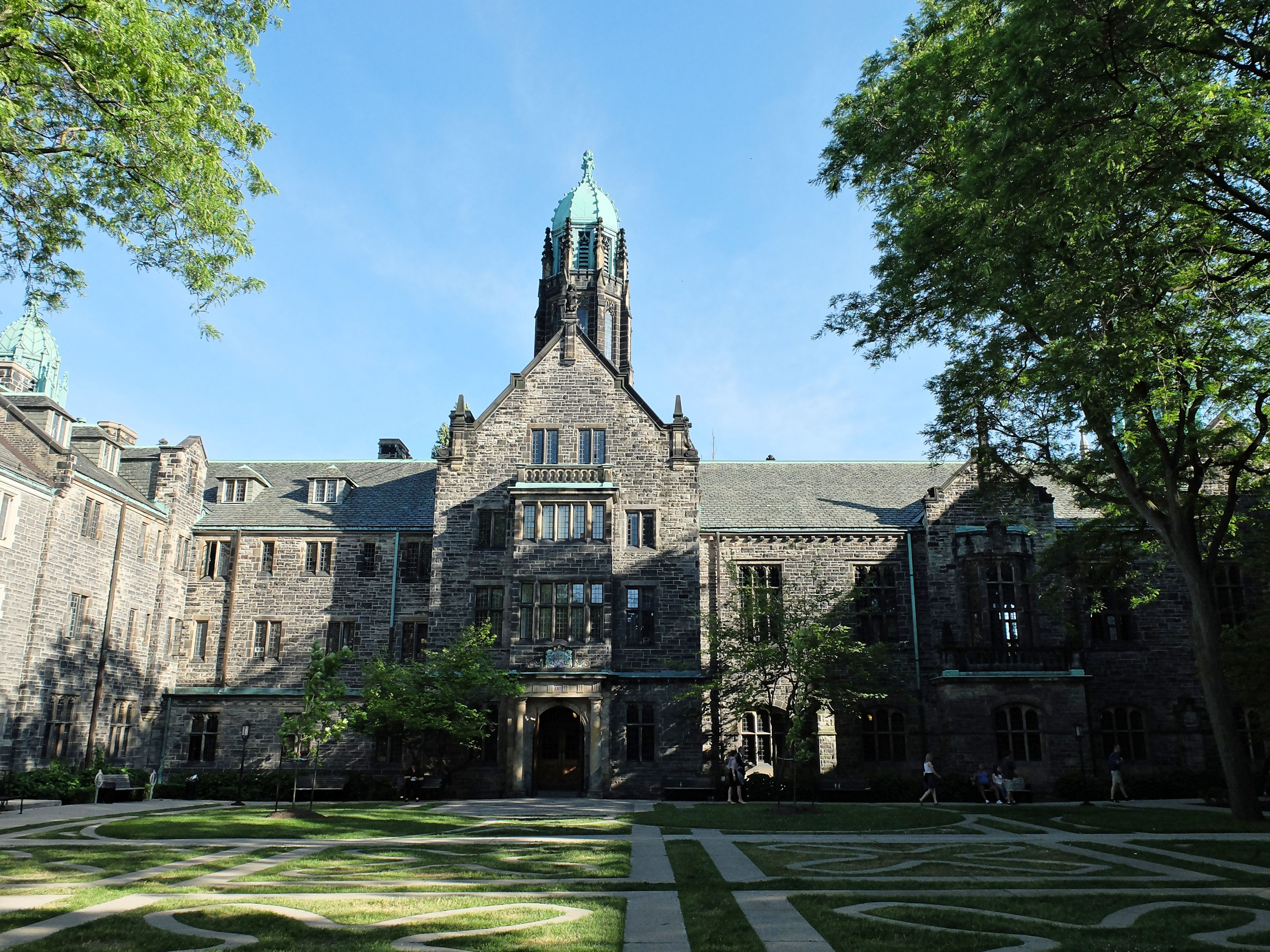
The quadrangle of Trinity College

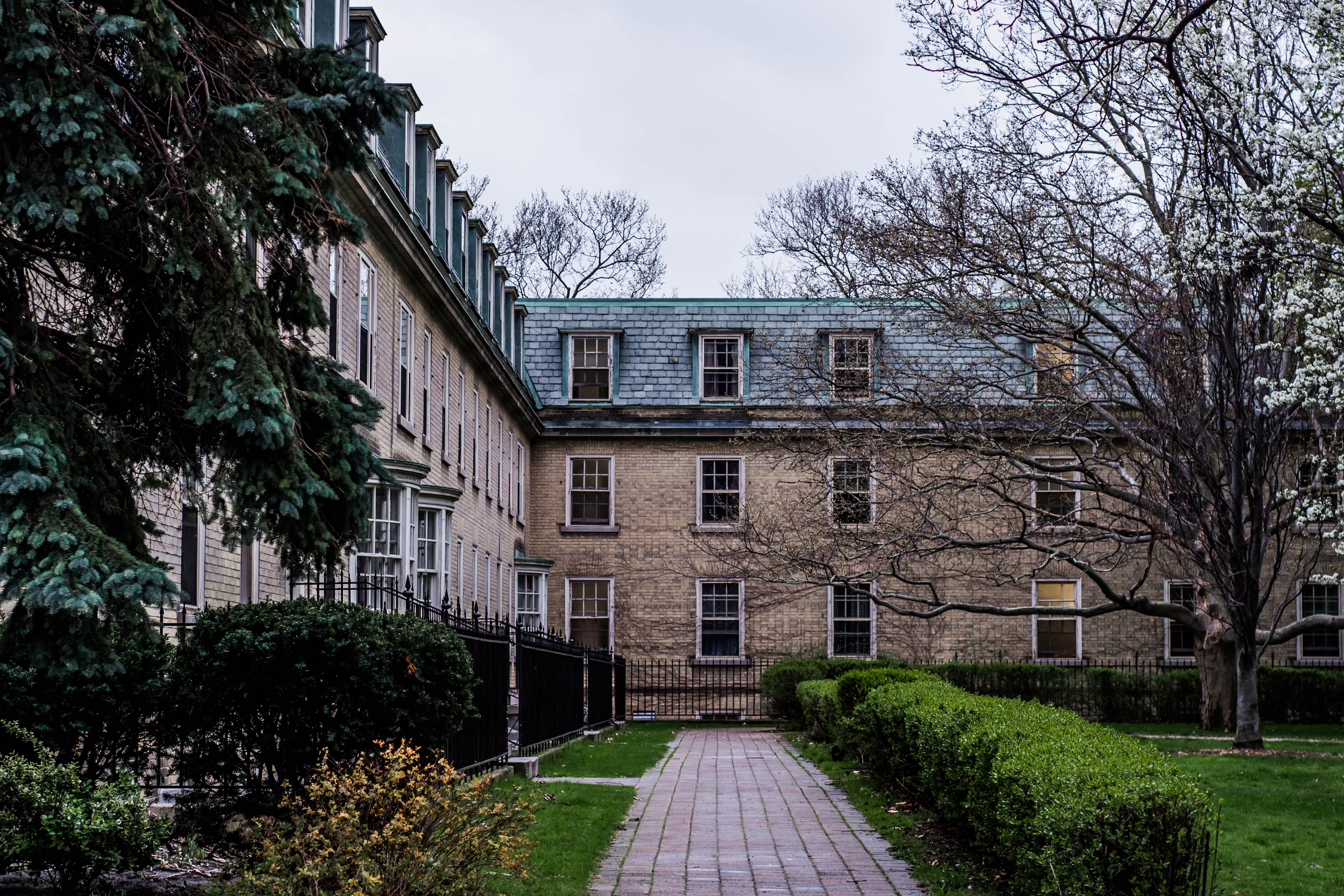
Sir Daniel Wilson Hall of University College

Unlike most North American institutions, the University of Toronto retains a collegiate system with a model that resembles those of the University of Cambridge and the University of Oxford in Britain. Its colleges, all located on the historic St. George campus, range in their level of autonomy over admissions, scholarships, programs and other academic and financial affairs, however most carry the housing and social duties of typical residential colleges. This model emerged in the 19th century, as ecclesiastical colleges considered various forms of union with the University of Toronto, the provincial university of Ontario, to ensure their viability. The desire to preserve religious traditions in a secular institution resulted in the federative collegiate system that came to characterize the university.

Three formerly independent institutions retain their legal status as universities, and are thus known as federated universities. Each of these has a secular undergraduate faculty (also known as "colleges") which are part of the University of Toronto's Faculty of Arts and Science, and a graduate faculty of theology affiliated with the Toronto School of Theology. The three federated universities are:

- University of St. Michael's College
- Trinity College
- Victoria University

Several theological colleges are federated within the University of Toronto and grant graduate degrees in divinity through the Toronto School of Theology. These federated colleges are:

- Emmanuel College (within Victoria University)
- Knox College
- Regis College
- Wycliffe College

Apart from the federated colleges and universities, there are four constituent colleges that were created by the University of Toronto for undergraduate students in the Faculty of Arts and Science, and are fully owned and operated by the university. The four constituent colleges are:

- Innis College
- New College
- University College
- Woodsworth College

Massey College is an independent residential college affiliated with the university that acts as a residence and academic community on the St. George campus for students in the School of Graduate Studies.

==== History of colleges ====
University College was the founding nondenominational college, created in 1853 after the university was secularized. Knox College, a Presbyterian institution, and Wycliffe College, a low church seminary, both encouraged their students to study for non-divinity degrees at University College. In 1885, they entered a formal affiliation with the University of Toronto, and became federated schools in 1890. The idea of federation initially met strong opposition at Victoria University, a Methodist school in Cobourg, but a financial incentive in 1890 convinced the school to join. Decades after the death of John Strachan, the Anglican seminary Trinity College entered federation in 1904, followed in 1910 by St. Michael's College, a Roman Catholic college founded by the Basilian Fathers. Among the institutions that had considered federation but ultimately remained independent were McMaster University, a Baptist school that later moved to Hamilton, and Queen's College, a Presbyterian school in Kingston that later became Queen's University.

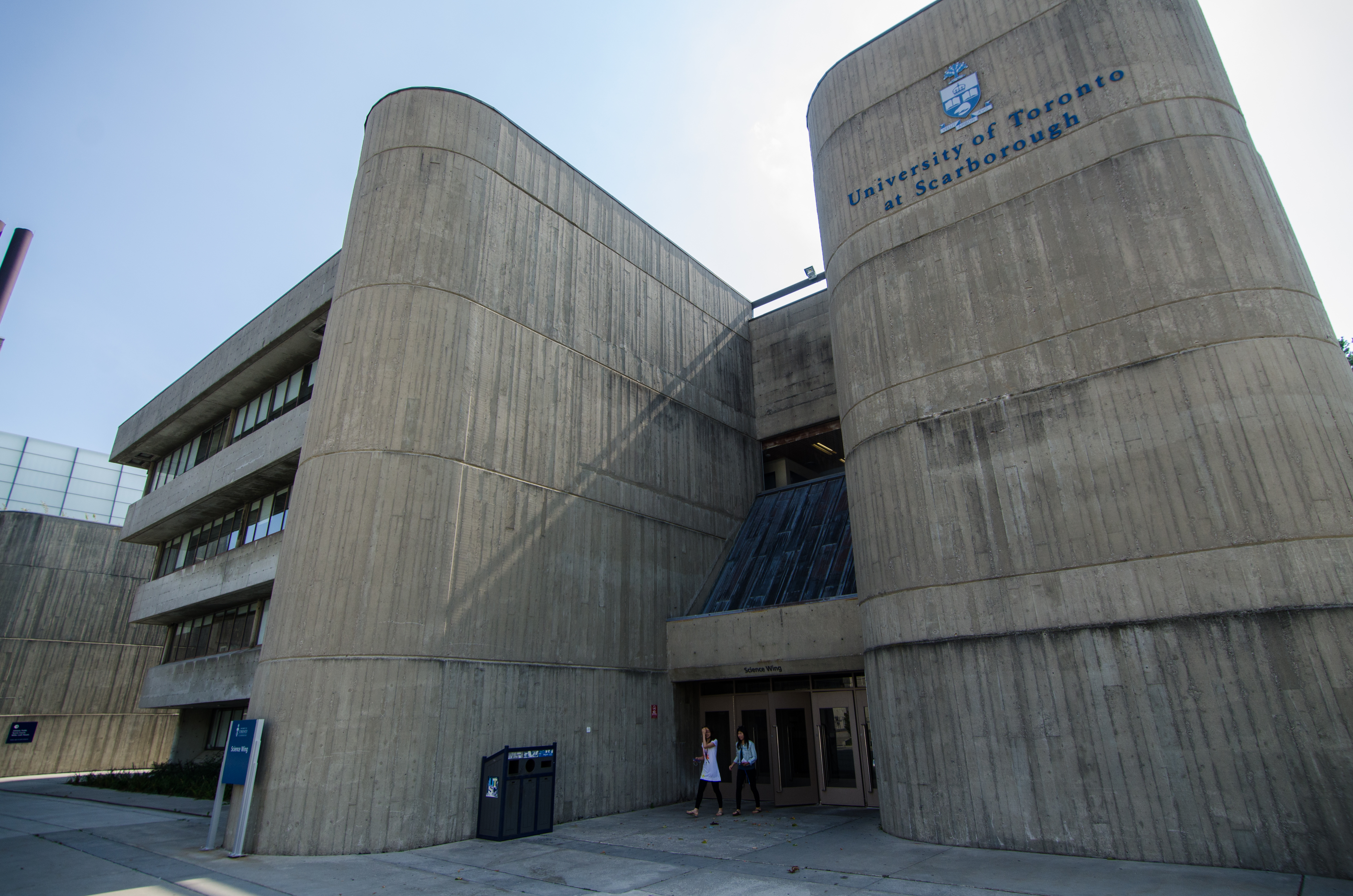
The Andrews Building is the original structure of Scarborough College, completed in 1964.

The post-war era saw the creation of New College in 1962, Innis College and Scarborough College in 1964, Erindale College in 1967 and Woodsworth College in 1974, all of them nondenominational and part of the Faculty of Arts and Science. Along with University College, they were the university's constituent colleges, established and funded by the central administration and therefore financially dependent. Erindale and Scarborough colleges, in Toronto Township (now Mississauga) and Scarborough, respectively, were the first to establish their campuses at a distance from the original St. George campus in Toronto. Massey College was established in 1963 by the Massey Foundation as an independent residential college, formally affiliated with the university, exclusively for graduate students. Regis College, a Jesuit seminary, entered federation with the university in 1979.

In 1972, Scarborough College separated from the Faculty of Arts and Science to become its own academic division in control of the curriculum at the university's quickly expanding Scarborough campus, and dropping "college" from its name in favour of "campus" in 1983. Erindale College followed suit decades later in 2002, becoming its own academic division anticipating rapid growth in student enrolment when the Ontario Academic Credit year was phased out in the early 2000s. The two campuses adopted their current names of the University of Toronto Scarborough and University of Toronto Mississauga, respectively, around 2007 and remain wholly owned divisions of the university.

In contrast with the constituent colleges, the colleges of Knox, Massey, Regis, St. Michael's, Trinity, Victoria and Wycliffe continue to exist as legally distinct entities, each possessing a separate financial endowment. While St. Michael's, Trinity and Victoria continue to recognize their religious affiliations and heritage, they have since adopted secular policies of enrolment and teaching in non-divinity subjects. Some colleges have, or once had, collegiate structures of their own: Emmanuel College is a college of Victoria and St. Hilda's College is part of Trinity; St. Joseph's College had existed as a college within St. Michael's until it was dissolved in 2006. Ewart College existed as an affiliated college until 1991, when it was merged into Knox College. Postgraduate theology degrees are conferred by the colleges of Knox, Regis and Wycliffe, along with the divinity faculties within Emmanuel, St. Michael's and Trinity, including joint degrees with the university through the Toronto School of Theology.

== Academics ==
The University of Toronto consists of 19 academic divisions (mostly called "faculties") spanning a range of disciplines at both the undergraduate and graduate level. There are 14 professional faculties (such as Law and Medicine) in addition to the Faculty of Arts and Science, that are mostly based on the St. George campus. The Mississauga and Scarborough campuses each act as their own Arts and Science divisions, and together with the Faculty of Arts and Science comprise the majority of undergraduate education at the university. The schools of Graduate Studies and Continuing Studies are unique tri-campus divisions, the former of which is an administrative entity that operates in coordination with other faculties and units.

Academic divisions of the University of Toronto
- Faculty of Applied Science and Engineering
- John H. Daniels Faculty of Architecture, Landscape, and Design
- Faculty of Arts and Science
- School of Continuing Studies
- Faculty of Dentistry
- School of Graduate Studies
- Faculty of Information
- Henry N.R. Jackman Faculty of Law
- Rotman School of Management
- Temerty Faculty of Medicine
- Faculty of Music
- Lawrence Bloomberg Faculty of Nursing
- Leslie Dan Faculty of Pharmacy
- Faculty of Kinesiology and Physical Education
- Dalla Lana School of Public Health
- Factor-Inwentash Faculty of Social Work
- Ontario Institute for Studies in Education
- University of Toronto Mississauga
- University of Toronto Scarborough

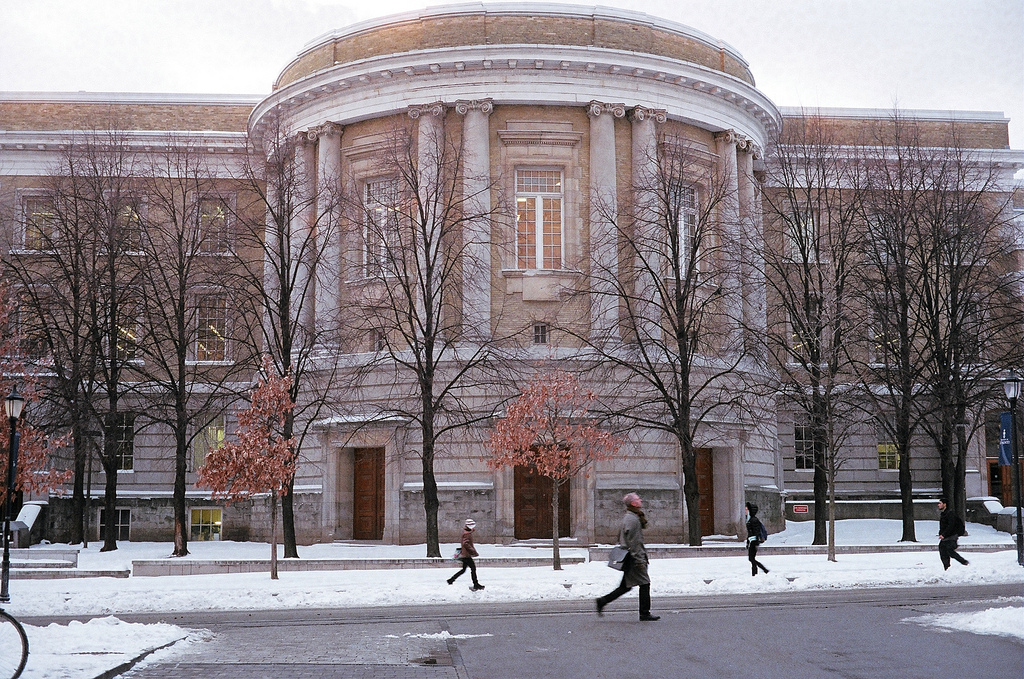
The Sandford Fleming Building contains offices of the Faculty of Applied Science and Engineering.

The Faculty of Arts and Science represents over half of students on the St. George campus, and operates the campus's undergraduate business program, Rotman Commerce, in collaboration with the Rotman School of Management. The Faculty of Applied Science and Engineering is the other major first-entry undergraduate faculty at St. George.

The University of Toronto is the birthplace of an influential school of thought on communication theory and literary criticism known as the Toronto School. Described as "the theory of the primacy of communication in the structuring of human cultures and the structuring of the human mind", the school is rooted in the works of Eric A. Havelock and Harold Innis and the subsequent contributions of Edmund Snow Carpenter, Northrop Frye and Marshall McLuhan. Since 1963, the McLuhan Program in Culture and Technology of the Faculty of Information has carried the mandate for teaching and advancing the Toronto School.

Several notable works in arts and humanities are based at the university, including the Dictionary of Canadian Biography since 1959 and the Collected Works of Erasmus since 1969. The Records of Early English Drama collects and edits the surviving documentary evidence of dramatic arts in pre-Puritan England, while the Dictionary of Old English compiles the early vocabulary of the English language from the Anglo-Saxon period.

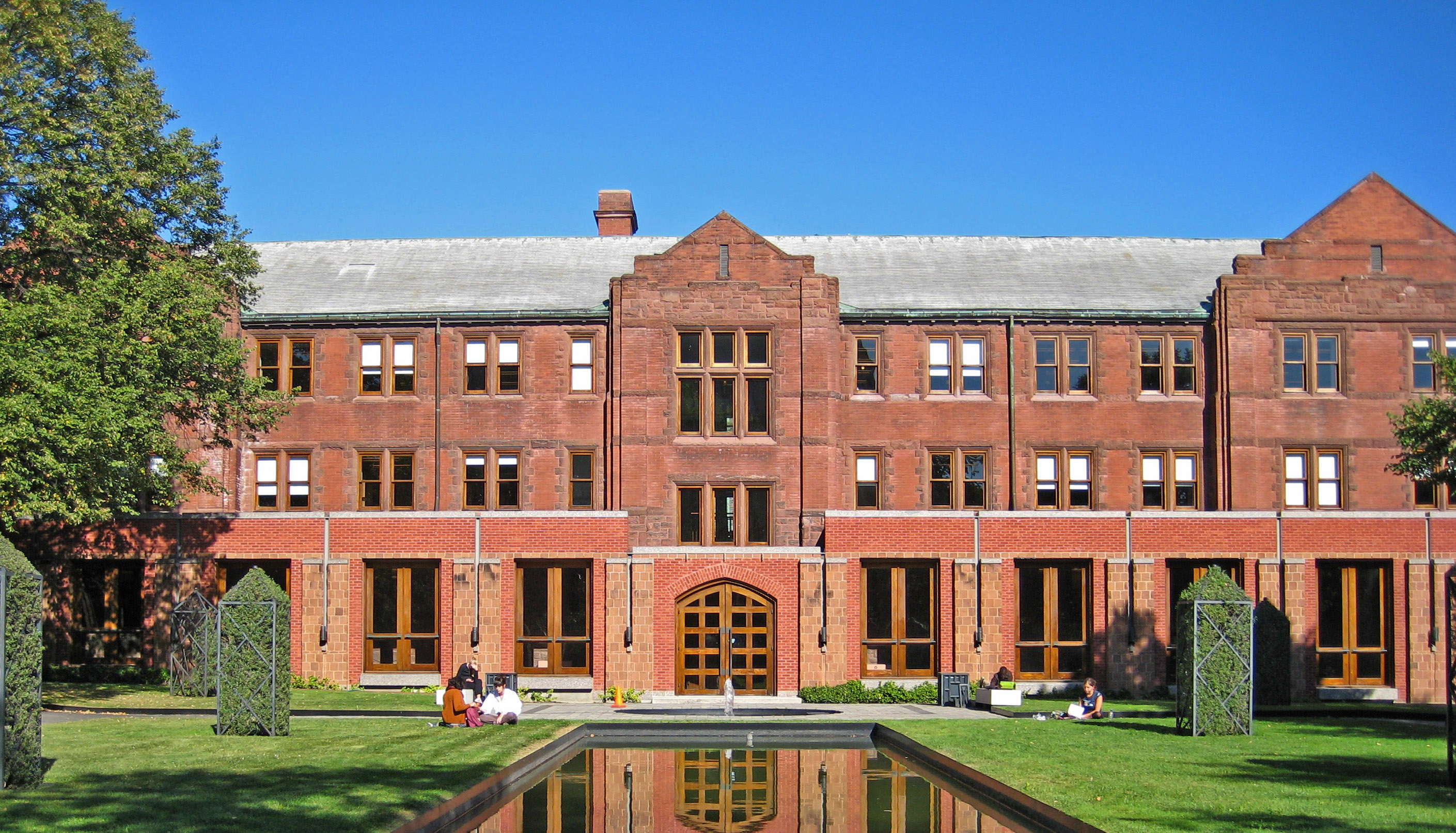
The Munk School of Global Affairs and Public Policy encompasses programs and research institutes for international relations and public policy.

The Munk School of Global Affairs and Public Policy encompasses the university's various programs and curricula in international affairs, foreign policy, and public policy. As the Cold War heightened, Toronto's Slavic studies program evolved into an important institution on Soviet politics and economics, financed by the Rockefeller, Ford and Mellon foundations. The Munk School is also home to the G20 Research Group, which conducts independent monitoring and analysis on the Group of Twenty, and the Citizen Lab, which conducts research on Internet censorship as a joint founder of the OpenNet Initiative. The university operates international offices in Berlin, Hong Kong and Siena.

The Dalla Lana School of Public Health is a faculty of the University of Toronto that began as one of the Schools of Hygiene begun by the Rockefeller Foundation in 1927. The School went through a dramatic renaissance after the 2003 SARS crisis, and it is now Canada's largest public health school, with more than 750 faculty, 800 students, and research and training partnerships with institutions throughout Toronto and the world. With more than $39 million in research funding per year, the School supports discovery in global health, tobacco impacts on health, occupational disease and disability, air pollution, inner city health, circumpolar health, and many other pressing issues in population health.

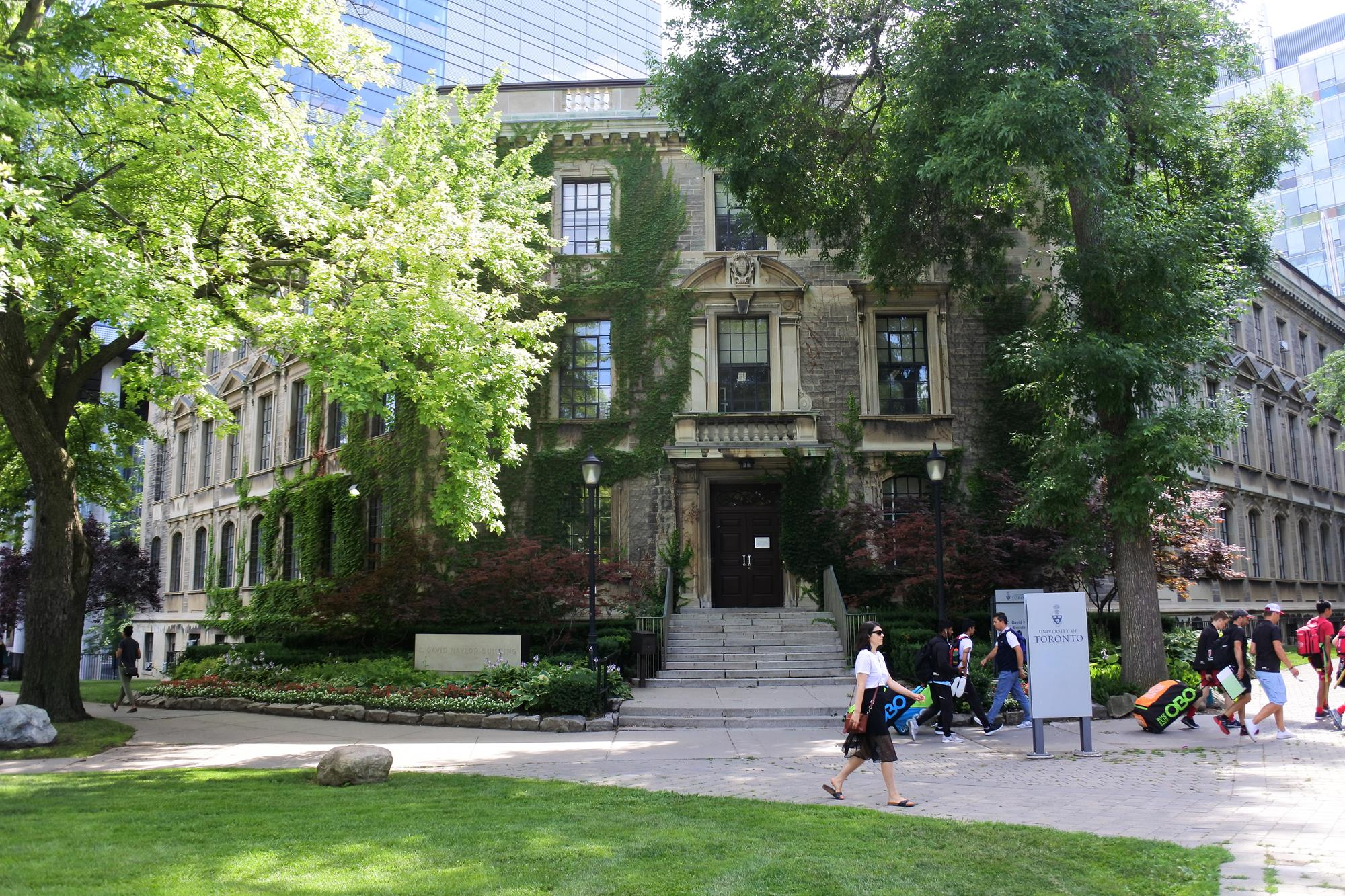
The Naylor Building contains offices for the university's Department of Medicine.

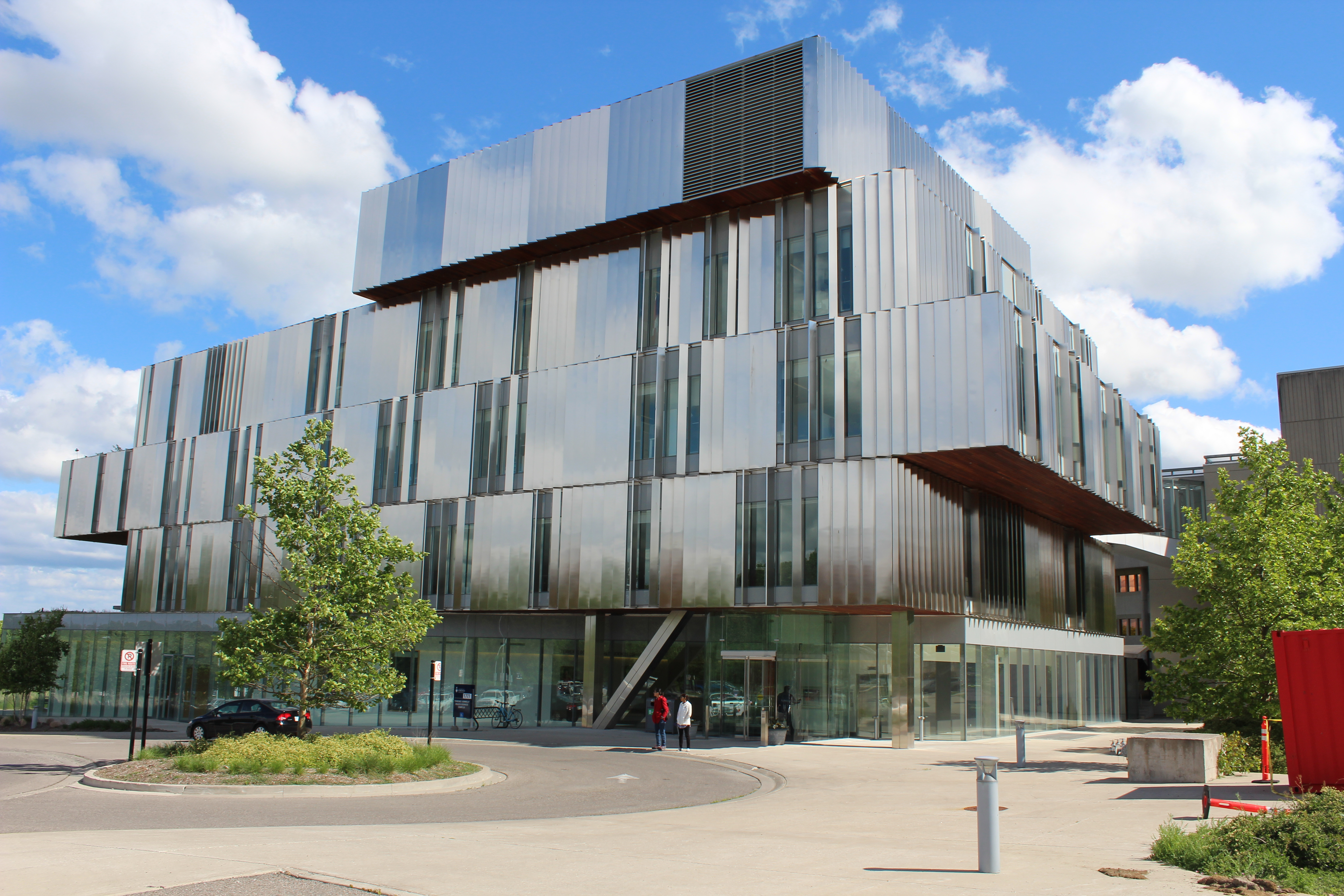
The Terrence Donnelly Health Sciences Complex is one of several buildings that host the MD program.

The Temerty Faculty of Medicine is affiliated with a network of 14 teaching hospitals known as the Toronto Academic Health Science Network (TAHSN), providing medical treatment, research and advisory services to patients and clients from Canada and abroad. A core member of the network is University Health Network, itself a specialized federation of Toronto General Hospital, Princess Margaret Cancer Centre, Toronto Western Hospital, and Toronto Rehabilitation Institute. Physicians in the medical institutes have cross-appointments to faculty and supervisory positions in university departments, and the faculty operates on all three University of Toronto campuses. The Rotman School of Management developed the discipline and methodology of integrative thinking, upon which the school used to base its curriculum. Founded in 1887, the Faculty of Law's emphasis on formal teachings of liberal arts and legal theory was then considered unconventional, but gradually helped shift the country's legal education system away from the apprenticeship model that prevailed until the mid-20th century. The Ontario Institute for Studies in Education is the teachers college of the university, affiliated with its two laboratory schools, the Institute of Child Study and the University of Toronto Schools (a private high school run by the university). Autonomous institutes at the university include the Canadian Institute for Theoretical Astrophysics, the Pontifical Institute of Mediaeval Studies and the Fields Institute.

The University of Toronto also offers a small number of joint programs with other institutions, awarding both a bachelor's degree and college diploma. Such programs include New Media Studies, Journalism, and Music Industry and Technology, in partnership with Centennial College (on the Scarborough campus); Art and Art History with Sheridan College (on the Mississauga campus); and Radiation Therapy with the Michener Institute (on the St. George campus).

=== Admissions ===
Among the University of Toronto's 19 academic divisions, seven are considered direct-entry (or first-entry) divisions, which offer undergraduate programs for applicants directly from high school without prior post-secondary education. Such divisions represented 68 per cent of the university's total enrolment in 2024–25.

Direct-entry divisions of the University of Toronto
Campus	Mississauga	Scarborough	St. George				
Division	Arts and Science			Faculty of Applied Science and Engineering	John H. Daniels Faculty of Architecture, Landscape, and Design	Faculty of Kinesiology and Physical Education	Faculty of Music
Division	U of T Mississauga	U of T Scarborough	Faculty of Arts and Science	Faculty of Applied Science and Engineering	John H. Daniels Faculty of Architecture, Landscape, and Design	Faculty of Kinesiology and Physical Education	Faculty of Music
2024–25 new enrolment (# of students)	4,047	3,821	7,647	1,347	307	384	154

In the 2024–25 admissions cycle, the University of Toronto accepted 59,208 undergraduate students to first-entry divisions out of 77,087 applicants, for an acceptance rate of 76.8 per cent. The same year, the university accepted 1,589 undergraduate students to second-entry professional divisions out of 10,108 applicants, for an acceptance rate of 15.7 per cent. Its overall acceptance rate for undergraduate programs was 69.7 per cent.

At the graduate level, the university admitted 15,214 students out of 45,221 applicants, for an admission rate of 33.6 per cent in the 2024–25 year.

=== Library and collections ===
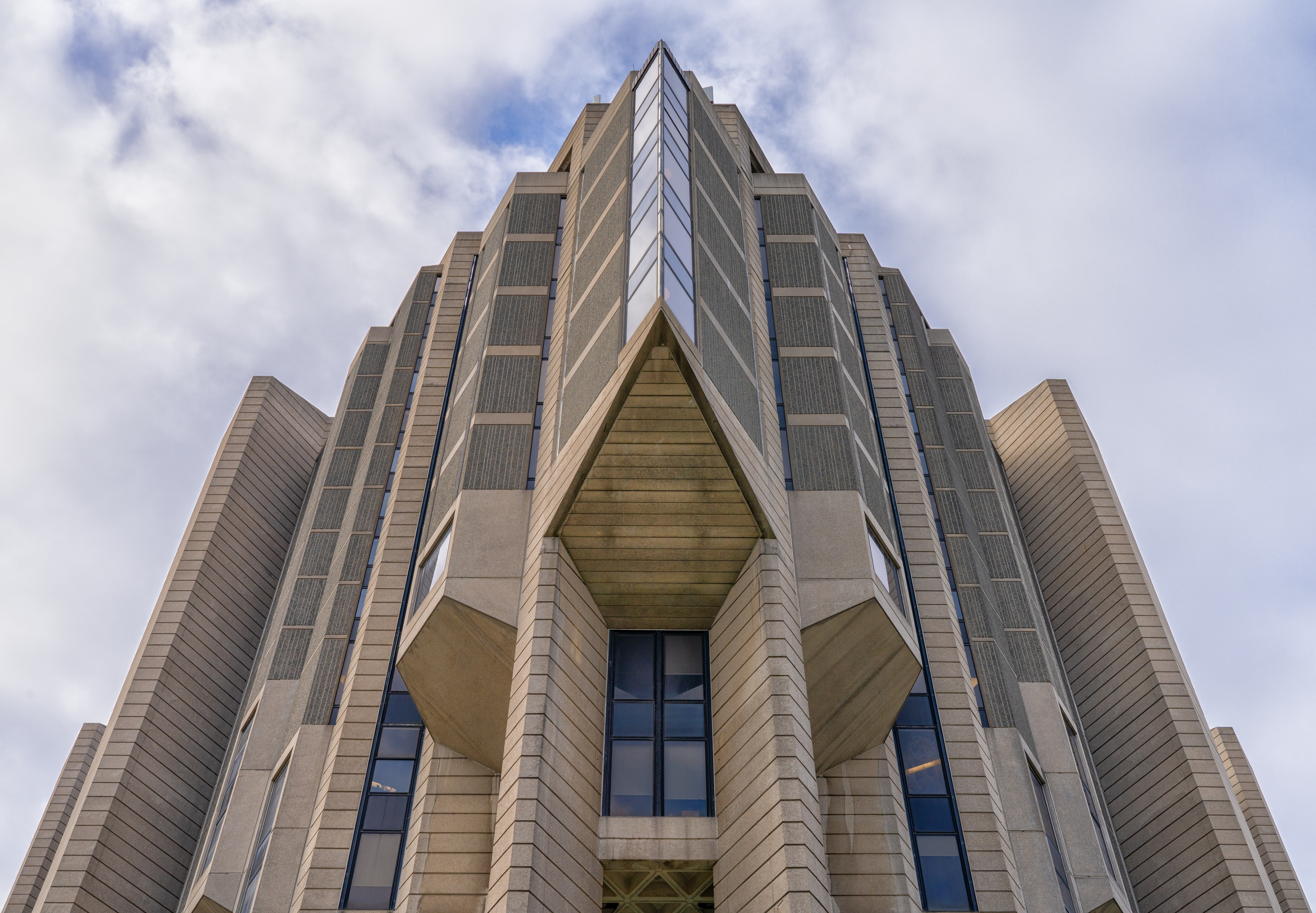
Robarts Library, a Brutalist structure on the St. George campus, houses the university's main collection for humanities and social sciences.

The University of Toronto Libraries is the third-largest academic library system in North America, following those of Harvard and Yale, measured by number of volumes held. Its collections include more than 12 million print books, 1.9 million digital books, over 160,000 journal titles, and close to 30,000 metres of archival materials. It consists of 40 libraries across the university's three campuses, the largest being Robarts Library, which holds about five million bound volumes that form the main collection for humanities and social sciences. The Thomas Fisher Rare Book Library constitutes one of the largest repositories of publicly accessible rare books and manuscripts. Its collections range from ancient Egyptian papyri to incunabula and libretti; the subjects of focus include British, Western and Canadian literature, Aristotle, Darwin, the Spanish Civil War, the history of science and medicine, Canadiana and the history of books. The Cheng Yu Tung East Asian Library has a rare 40,000-volume Chinese collection from the Song dynasty (960–1279) to the Qing dynasty (1644–1911) that was originally held by scholar Mu Xuexun (1880–1929). The Richard Charles Lee Canada-Hong Kong Library has the largest research collection for Hong Kong and Canada–Hong Kong studies outside of Hong Kong. The rest of the library collections are dispersed at departmental and faculty libraries in addition to about 1.3 million bound volumes the colleges hold. The university has collaborated with the Internet Archive since 2005 to digitize some of its library holdings.

Housed within University College, the University of Toronto Art Centre contains three major art collections. The Malcove Collection is primarily represented by Early Christian and Byzantine sculptures, bronzeware, furniture, icons and liturgical items. It also includes glassware and stone reliefs from the Greco-Roman period, and the painting Adam and Eve by Lucas Cranach the Elder, dated from 1538. The University of Toronto Collection features Canadian contemporary art, while the University College Art Collection holds significant works by the Group of Seven and 19th century landscape artists.

=== Rankings and reputation ===
University rankings

World rankings
- ARWU World: 26
- QS World: 29
- THE World: 21
- USNWR World: 17
- 1

Canadian rankings
- QS National: 2
- THE National: 1
- USNWR National: 1
- Maclean's Medical/Doctoral: 2

In the 2022 Academic Ranking of World Universities (also known as the Shanghai Ranking), the university ranked 22nd in the world and first in Canada. The 2026 QS World University Rankings ranked the university 29th in the world, and second in Canada after McGill. In 2019, it ranked 11th among the universities around the world by SCImago Institutions Rankings. The 2023 Times Higher Education World University Rankings ranked the university 18th in the world, and first in Canada. In the Times' 2020 reputational ranking, the publication placed the university 19th in the world. In the 2024–25 U.S. News & World Report Best Global University Ranking, the university ranked 17th in the world, and first in Canada. The Canadian-based Maclean's magazine ranked the University of Toronto second in their 2022–2023 Medical Doctoral university category. Maclean's 2023 university rankings also ranked the University of Toronto first in its reputation survey. The university was ranked in spite of having opted out—along with several other universities in Canada—of participating in Maclean's graduate survey since 2006.

The university's research performance has been noted in several bibliometric university rankings, which use citation analysis to evaluate the impact a university has on academic publications. In 2019, the Performance Ranking of Scientific Papers for World Universities ranked the university fourth in the world, and first in Canada. The University Ranking by Academic Performance 2019–2020 rankings placed the university second in the world, and first in Canada.

Along with academic and research-based rankings, the university has also been ranked by publications that evaluate the employment prospects of its graduates. In the Times Higher Education's 2022 global employability ranking, the university ranked 11th in the world, and first in Canada. In QS's 2022 graduate employability ranking, the university ranked 21st in the world, and first in Canada. In a 2013 employment survey conducted by The New York Times, the University of Toronto was ranked 14th in the world.

In 2018, University of Toronto Entrepreneurship was ranked the fourth best university-based incubator in the world by UBI Global in the "World Top Business Incubator – Managed by a University" category.

In 2025, the University of Toronto has been named the most sustainable university in the world according to QS World University Rankings.

=== Research ===
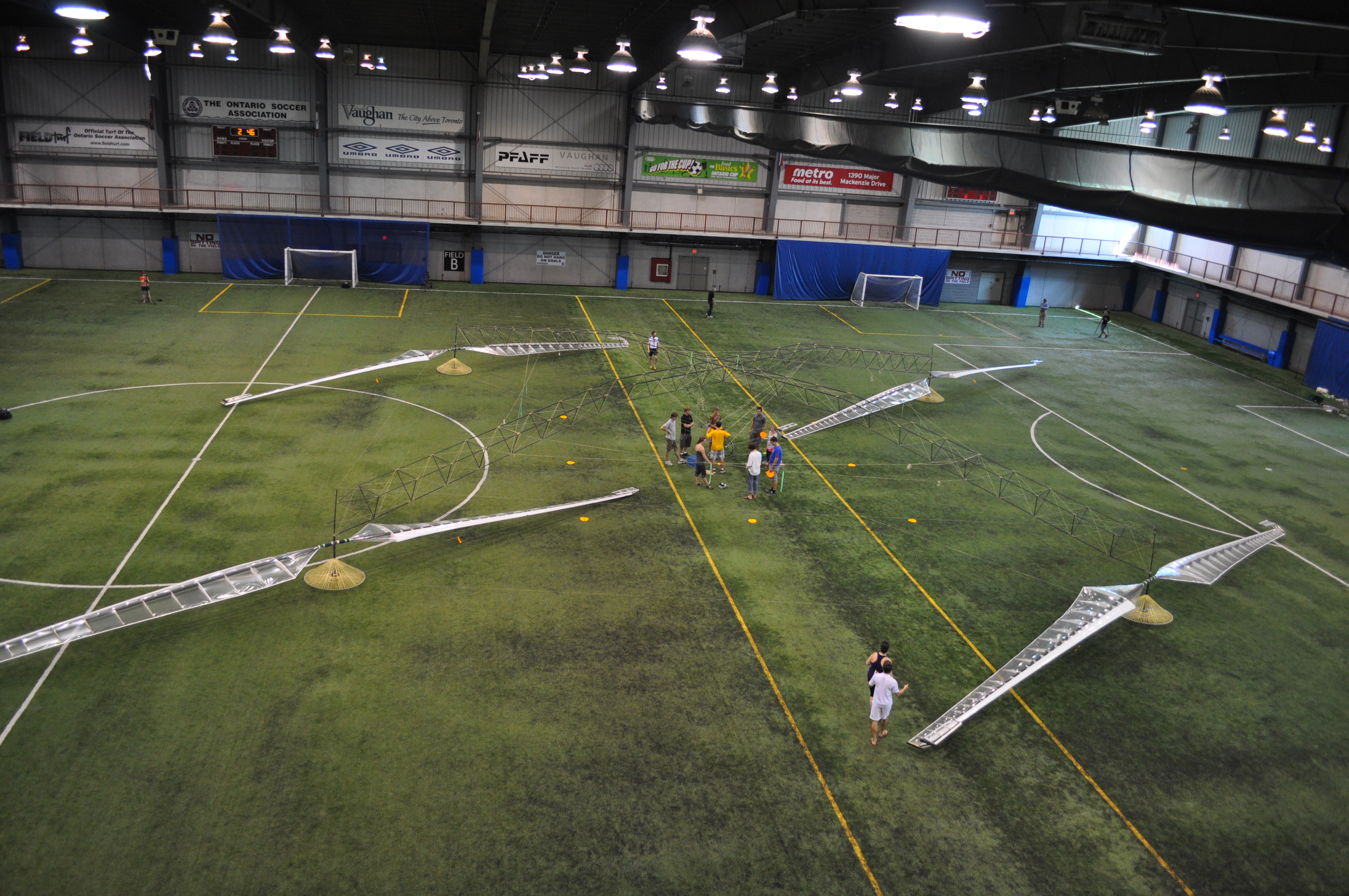
The AeroVelo Atlas won the Sikorsky Human Powered Helicopter Competition in 2013.

Since 1926, the University of Toronto has been a member of the Association of American Universities, a consortium of the leading North American research universities. The university manages by far the largest annual research budget of any university in Canada with sponsored direct-cost expenditures of $878 million in 2010. In 2021, the University of Toronto was named the top research university in Canada by Research Infosource, with a sponsored research income (external sources of funding) of $1,234.278 million in 2020. In the same year, the university's faculty averaged a sponsored research income of $446,600, while graduate students averaged a sponsored research income of $61,000. The federal government was the largest source of funding, with grants from the Canadian Institutes of Health Research, the Natural Sciences and Engineering Research Council and the Social Sciences and Humanities Research Council amounting to about one-third of the research budget. About eight per cent of research funding came from corporations, mostly in the healthcare industry.

The first practical electron microscope was built by the physics department in 1938. During World War II, the university developed the G-suit, a life-saving garment worn by Allied fighter plane pilots, later adopted for use by astronauts. Development of the infrared chemiluminescence technique improved analyses of energy behaviours in chemical reactions. In 1963, the asteroid 2104 Toronto is discovered in the David Dunlap Observatory in Richmond Hill and is named after the university. In 1972, studies on Cygnus X-1 led to the publication of the first observational evidence proving the existence of black holes. Toronto astronomers have also discovered the Uranian moons of Caliban and Sycorax, the dwarf galaxies of Andromeda I, II and III, and the supernova SN 1987A. A pioneer in computing technology, the university designed and built UTEC, one of the world's first operational computers, and later purchased Ferut, the second commercial computer after UNIVAC I. AlexNet, regarded as the first widely recognized application of deep convolutional networks in large-scale visual recognition, was developed at the university. Multi-touch technology was developed at Toronto, with applications ranging from handheld devices to high-end drawing monitors to collaboration walls. The AeroVelo Atlas, which won the Igor I. Sikorsky Human Powered Helicopter Competition in 2013, was developed by the university's team of students and graduates and was tested in Vaughan.

==== Biological breakthroughs ====
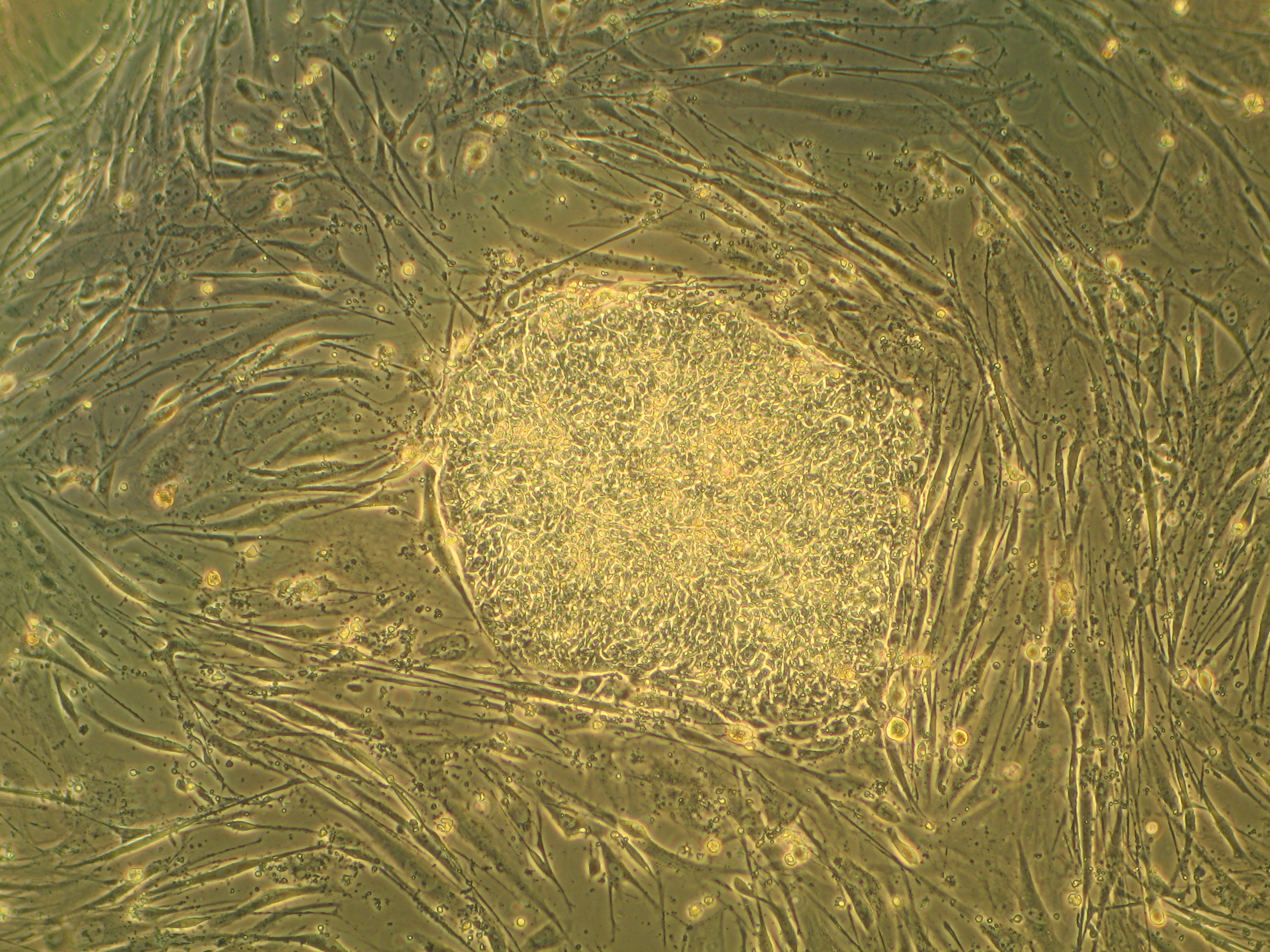
The discovery of stem cells by McCulloch and Till is the basis for all modern stem cell research.

The discovery of insulin at the University of Toronto by Banting and Best in 1921 is considered among the most significant events in the history of medicine. The stem cell was discovered at the university in 1963, forming the basis for bone marrow transplantation and all subsequent research on adult and embryonic stem cells. This was the first of many findings at Toronto relating to stem cells, including the identification of pancreatic and retinal stem cells. The cancer stem cell was first identified in 1997 by Toronto researchers, who have since found stem cell associations in leukemia, brain tumours and colorectal cancer. Medical inventions developed at Toronto include the glycaemic index, the infant cereal Pablum, the use of protective hypothermia in open heart surgery and the first artificial cardiac pacemaker. The first successful single-lung transplant was performed at Toronto in 1981, followed by the first nerve transplant in 1988, and the first double-lung transplant in 1989. Researchers identified the maturation promoting factor that regulates cell division, and discovered the T-cell receptor, which triggers responses of the immune system. The university is credited with isolating the genes that cause Fanconi anemia, cystic fibrosis and early-onset Alzheimer's disease, among numerous other diseases. Between 1914 and 1972, the university operated the Connaught Medical Research Laboratories, now part of the pharmaceutical corporation Sanofi-Aventis. Among the research conducted at the laboratory was the development of gel electrophoresis.

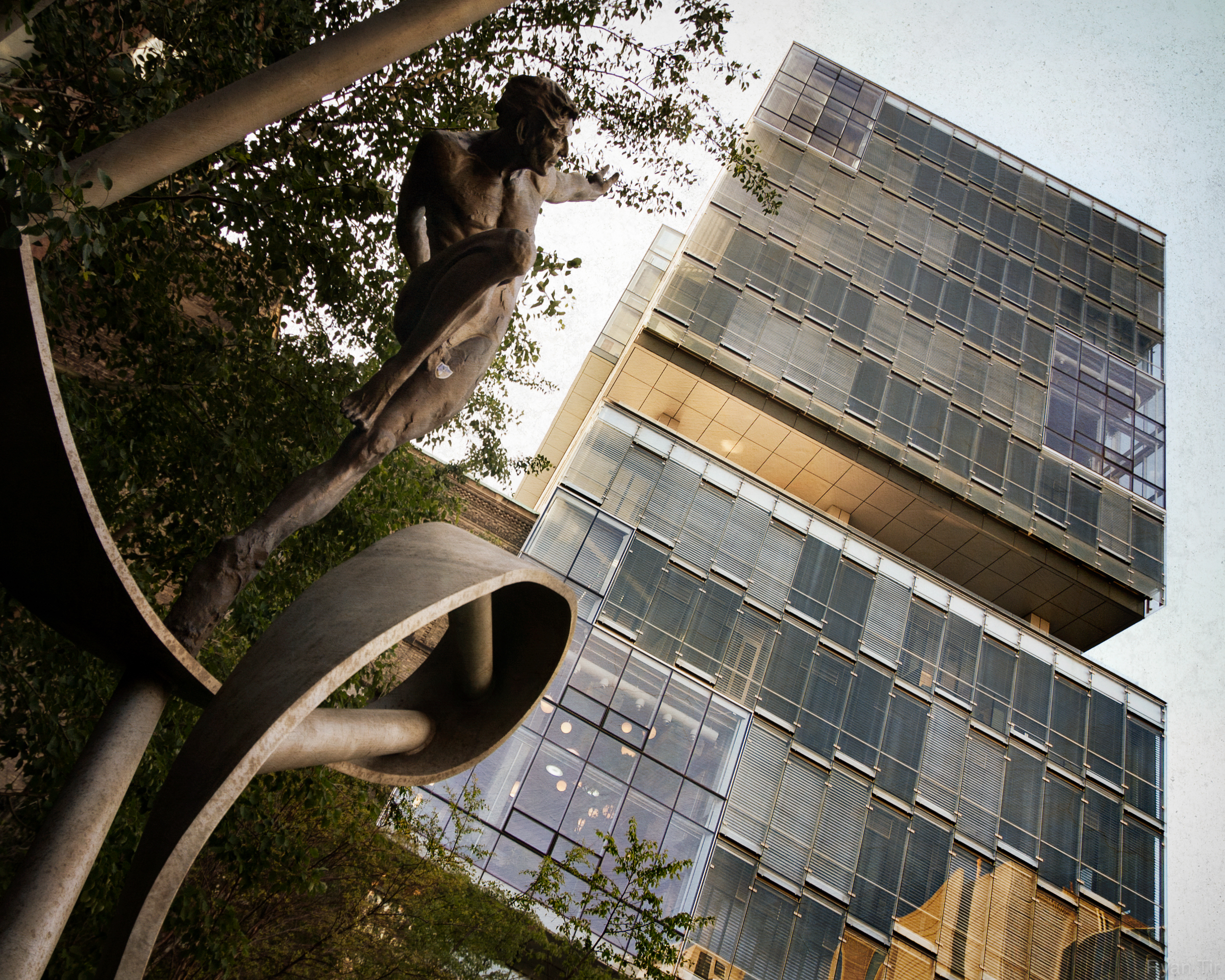
The Donnelly Centre is part of the Discovery District, one of the world's largest biotechnology research clusters.

The University of Toronto is the primary research presence that supports one of the world's largest concentrations of biotechnology firms. More than 5,000 principal investigators reside within 2 kilometres (1.2 mi) from the university grounds in Toronto's Discovery District, conducting $1 billion of medical research annually. MaRS Discovery District is a research park that serves commercial enterprises and the university's technology transfer ventures. In 2008, the university disclosed 159 inventions and had 114 active start-up companies. Its SciNet Consortium operates the most powerful supercomputer in Canada.

== Culture and student life ==
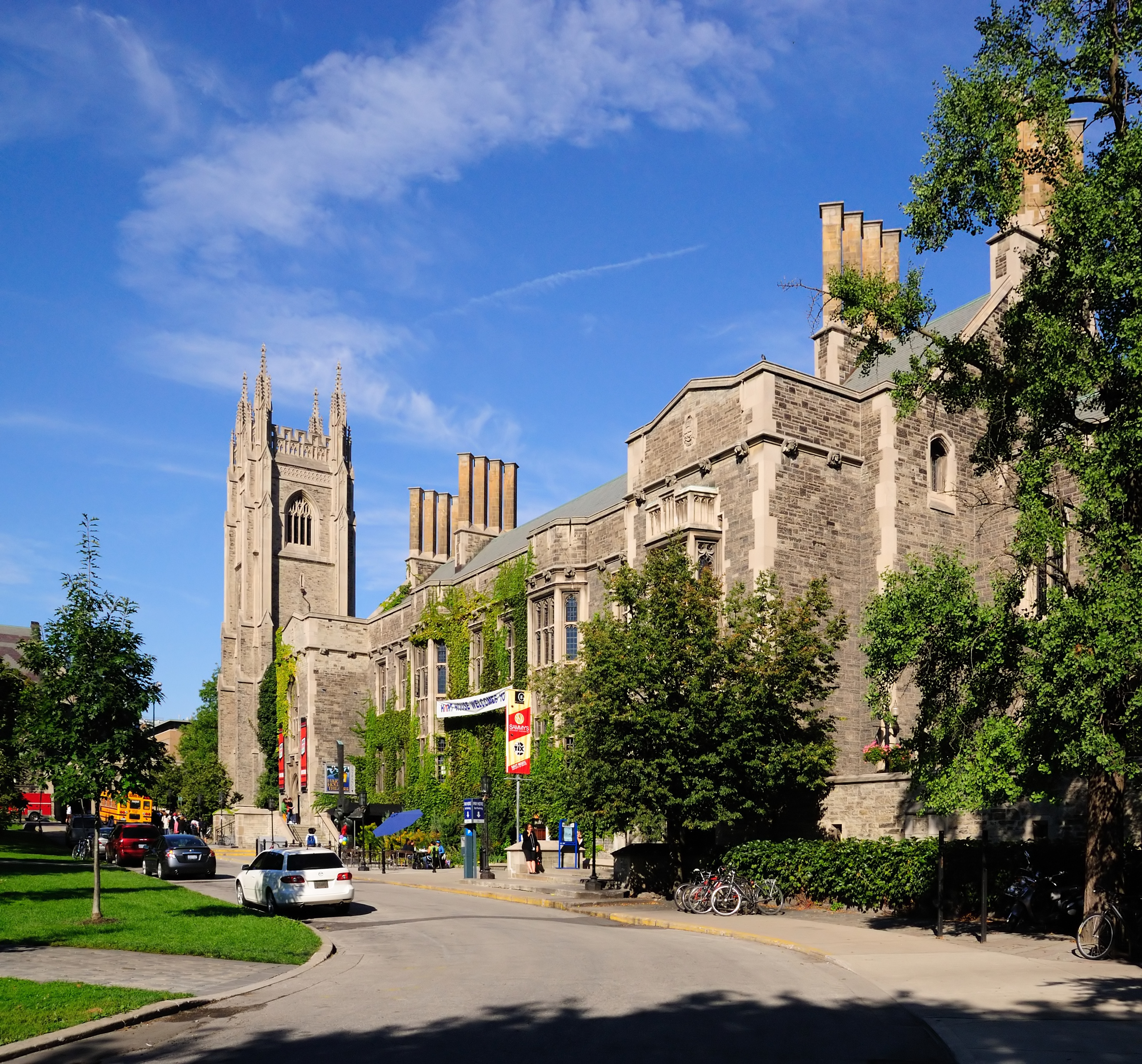
Generations of students have attended speeches, debates and concerts at Hart House.

A notable hub for social, cultural and recreational activities at the University of Toronto is Hart House, a neo-Gothic student activity centre on the St. George campus that was initiated and financed by alumnus-benefactor Vincent Massey and named for his grandfather Hart. Opened in 1919, the complex aimed to establish a communitarian student culture in the university and its students, who at the time kept largely within their own colleges under the decentralized collegiate system. The Hart House offers a range of services and facilities, including a library, restaurants, barbershops, an art museum, a theatre, concerts, debates, study spaces, and a swimming pool. The confluence of assorted functions is the result of an effort to create a holistic educational experience, a goal summarized in the Founders' Prayer. The Hart House model was influential in the planning of student centres at other universities, notably Cornell University's Willard Straight Hall in Ithaca, New York.

Hart House resembles some traditional aspects of student representation through its financial support of student clubs, and its standing committees and board of stewards that are composed mostly of undergraduate students. However, administrative and policy issues are mostly handled by the many students' unions that exist at each of the three campuses, along with various colleges, academic faculties and departments. There are five main student unions at the University of Toronto, the largest of which is the University of Toronto Students' Union, representing full-time undergraduate students on the St. George campus. The University of Toronto Mississauga Students' Union and Scarborough Campus Students' Union represent full-time undergraduates on the Mississauga campus and Scarborough campus respectively, and graduates and part-time undergraduate students at all three campuses are represented by the Graduate Students' Union and Association of Part-time Undergraduate Students at the University of Toronto, respectively.

The Hart House Debating Club employs a debating style that combines the American emphasis on analysis and the British use of wit. Smaller debating societies at Trinity, University and Victoria College have served as initial training grounds for debaters who later progress to Hart House. The club won the World Universities Debating Championship in 1981 and 2006. The North American Model United Nations (NAMUN) hosts an annual Model United Nations conference on campus, while the United Nations Society participates in various North American and international conferences. The Toronto chess team has captured the top title six times at the Pan American Intercollegiate Team Chess Championship. The Formula SAE Racing Team won the Formula Student European Championships in 2003, 2005 and 2006.

The University of Toronto also has an annual student-run tradition, the University of Toronto Aphrodite Project, where thousands of students complete a psychology questionnaire and are matched with their best algorithmic match on campus for Valentine's Day.

=== Graduation years ===
An informal tradition at the University of Toronto is for students (especially those in the Faculty of Applied Science and Engineering) to write their year of graduation as its last two digits with a capital letter "T" between them. For example, a graduate of the class of 1976 is denoted as "7T6". When pronounced, "seven-tee-six" is meant to sound like "seventy-six".

=== Greek life ===
The University of Toronto is home to the first collegiate fraternity in Canada, Zeta Psi, whose Toronto chapter has been active since 1879. Today, there are many further fraternity and sorority chapters at the St. George campus and some at the Scarborough campus.

=== Theatre and music ===
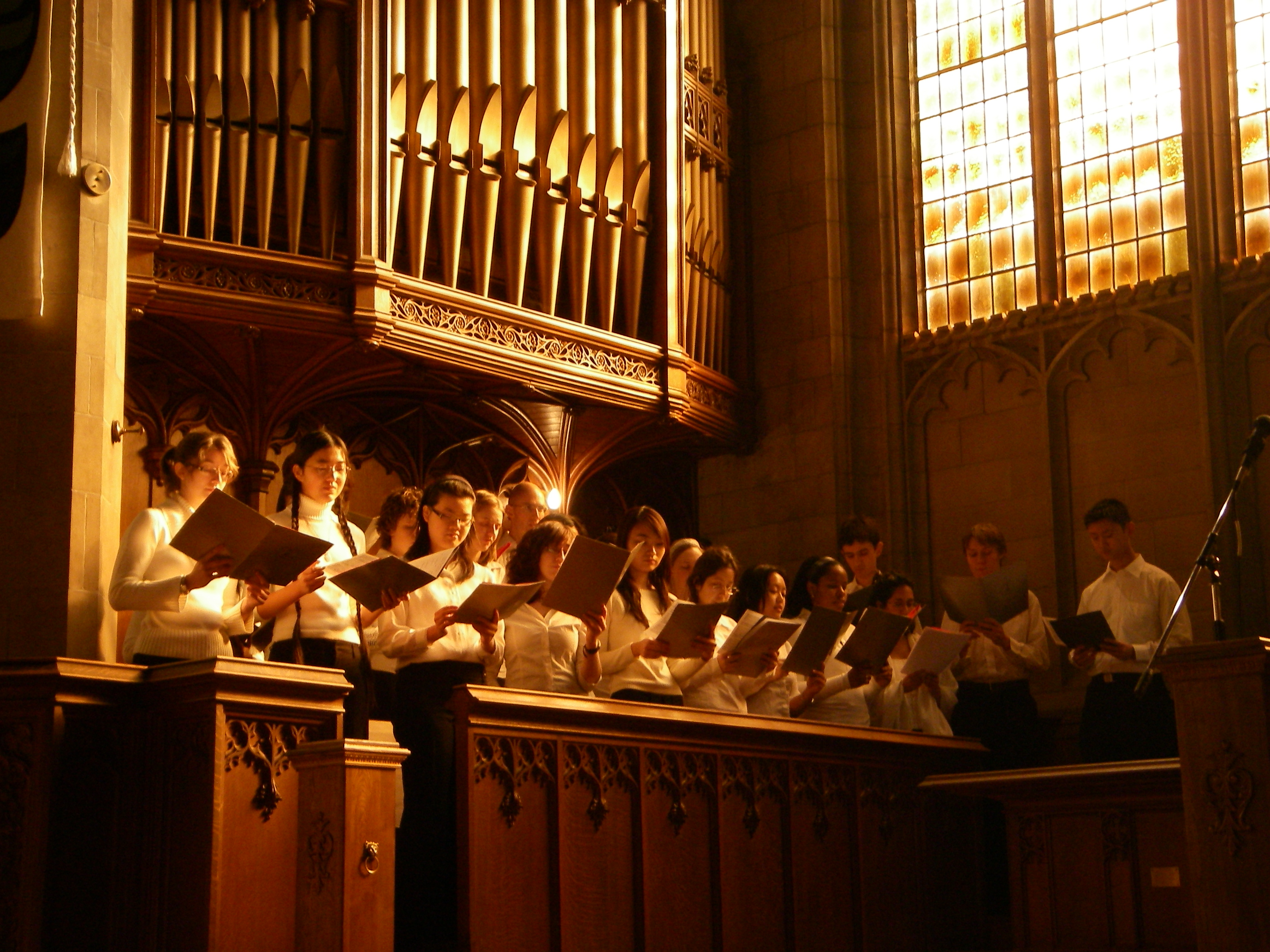
Sunlight fills Knox College Chapel during a Christmas concert of the engineering faculty's Skule Choir.

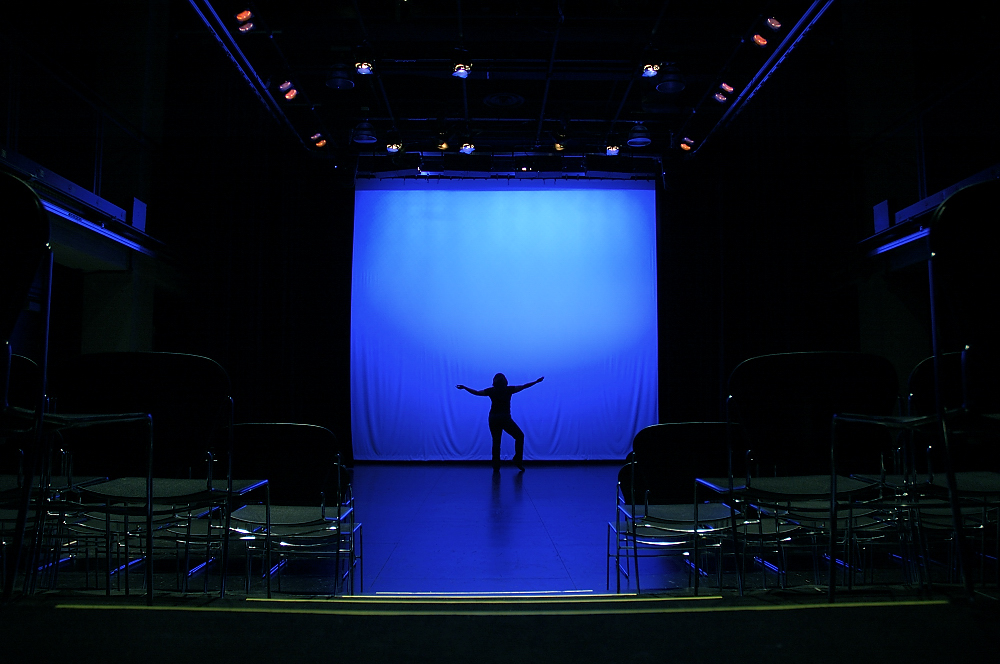
The Multimedia Studio Theatre (MiST).

Hart House Theatre is the university's student amateur theatre, generally producing four major plays every season. As old as Hart House itself, the theatre is considered a pioneer in Canadian theatre for introducing the Little Theatre Movement from Europe. It has cultivated numerous performing-arts talents, including Donald Sutherland, Lorne Michaels, Wayne and Shuster and William Hutt. Three members of the Group of Seven painters (Harris, Lismer and MacDonald) have been set designers at the theatre, and composer Healey Willan was director of music for 14 productions. The theatre also hosts annual variety shows run by several student theatrical companies at the colleges and academic faculties, the most prominent of which are U.C. Follies of University College, Skule Nite of the Faculty of Engineering, and Daffydil of the Faculty of Medicine, the latter in its 100th year of production in 2010–2011.

The main musical ensembles at Hart House are the orchestra, the chamber strings, the chorus, the jazz choir, the jazz ensemble and the symphonic band. The Jazz at Oscar's concert series performs big band and vocal jazz on Friday nights at the period lounge and bar of the Hart House Arbor Room. Open Stage is the monthly open mic event for singers, comics, poets, and storytellers. The Sunday Concert is the oldest musical series at Hart House; since 1922, the series has performed more than 600 free classical music concerts in the Great Hall.

=== Student media ===
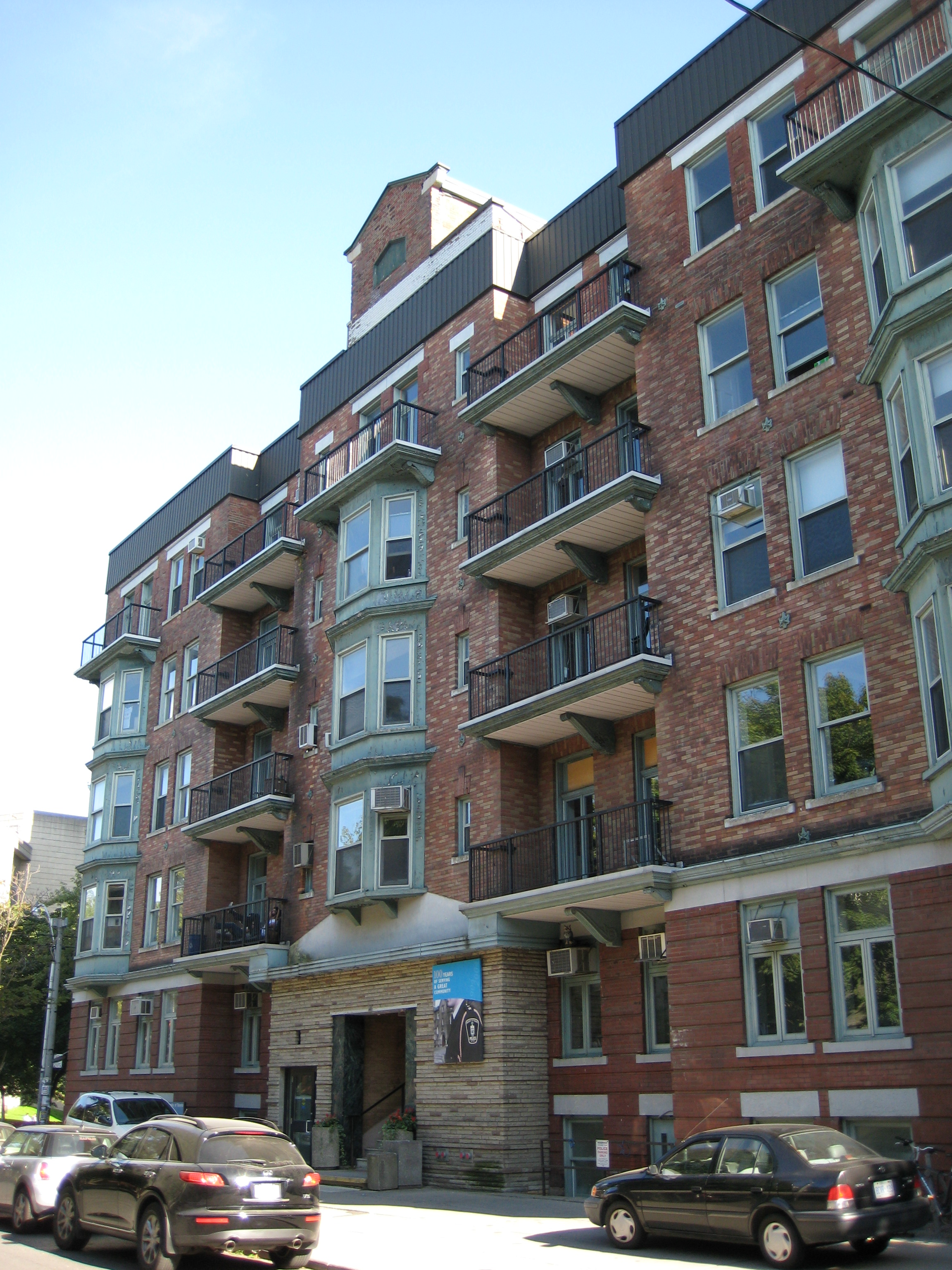
21 Sussex Court holds office space for several student organizations, like The Varsity newspaper.

The Varsity is one of Canada's oldest student-run newspapers, in publication since 1880. The paper was originally a daily broadsheet, but has since adopted a compact format and is now weekly during the Fall and Winter semesters. It publishes online in the summer. Hart House Review, a literary magazine, publishes prose, poetry, and visual art from emerging Canadian writers and artists. The Medium is the newspaper of the Mississauga campus as a successor to The Erindalian and CFRE is the campus's radio station. CIUT-FM is the St. George campus radio station, while the University of Toronto Television broadcasts student-produced content. Students at each campus, college and academic faculty also produce their own set of journals and news publications. University College's The Gargoyle was an early training ground for such notables as journalist and author Naomi Klein and musician/comedian Paul Shaffer. Victoria University's Acta Victoriana is the oldest active literary journal in Canada, and provided first publication credits to such literary figures as Margaret Atwood and Northrop Frye. Juxtaposition Global Health Magazine is another peer-reviewed student publication at the university.

Members of the student press have contributed to activist causes on several notable occasions. At the height of debate on coeducation in 1880, The Varsity published an article in its inaugural issue voicing in favour of admitting women. In 1895, the university suspended the editor of The Varsity for breach of collegiality, after he published a letter that harshly criticized the provincial government's dismissal of a professor and involvement in academic affairs. University College students then approved a motion by Varsity staff member and future Prime Minister William Lyon Mackenzie King and boycotted lectures for a week. After Prime Minister Pierre Trudeau decriminalized homosexuality throughout Canada in 1969, a medical research assistant placed an advertisement in The Varsity seeking volunteers to establish the University of Toronto Homophile Association, the first LGBTQ student association in Canada.

=== Residences ===
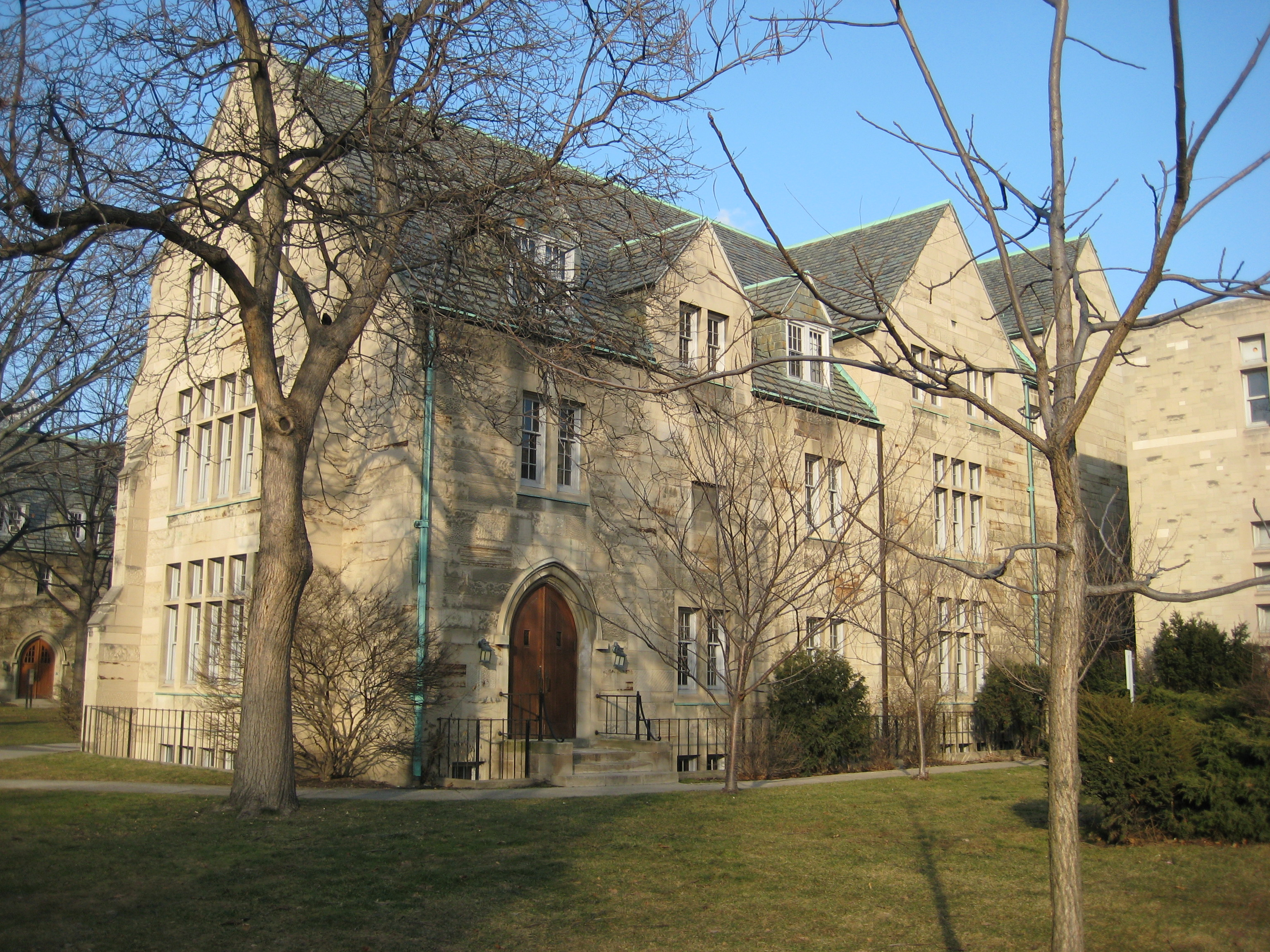
Teefy House, a residence hall of St. Michael's College, is home to female first-year undergraduate students.

The St. George campus has 14 residences which accommodate approximately 6,400 students in all. The university guarantees housing only for undergraduates in their first year of study, while most upper-year and graduate students reside off-campus. The Mississauga and Scarborough campuses have space for 1500 students each, however this is set to increase with plans to build more student housing on all three campuses. Traditionally, the adjacent neighbourhoods of The Annex to the north and Harbord Village to the west are popular settling grounds for St. George students, forming a distinct student quarter enclave, though Chinatown and Kensington Market, both to the south of the university, are increasingly populated by students.

=== Demographics ===
The University of Toronto has the most students of any Canadian post-secondary institution. Total enrolment across the university's three campuses surpassed 100,000 students for the first time in 2024. The University of Toronto is known for having a high enrolment of international students compared to other Canadian universities. It planned to grow its international enrolment to 20.1 per cent by 2021–2022. In 2017, the University of Toronto enrolled more international students than any other Canadian post-secondary institution. In 2024–2025, international students comprised 28.8 per cent of its student body.

Student Demographics (2024–25)
	Undergraduate	Graduate
Men	43.5%	39.7%
Women	53.6%	59.1%
Other gender or unreported	2.8%	1.2%
Canadian student	70.7%	73.1%
International student	29.3%	26.9%

In 2001–2002, the overall gender ratio was about 57.1 per cent women to 42.9 per cent men for enrolled students, or about 15 men for every 20 women. This gender gap has closed slightly over time to 54.8 per cent of students who identified as women, 42.7 per cent men, and 2.5 per cent another gender or unreported in 2024–2025. This gap is more pronounced in graduation rates, with 59 per cent of degrees conferred on women.

The overall average of high school grades for first-year students was about 86 per cent for fall 2014. The retention rate was 92.1 per cent.

Regarding courses of study, in 2024–2025, 28.1 per cent of students from all three campuses were enrolled in biology, engineering, or mathematics and physical sciences, while 25.2 per cent were enrolled in social sciences or humanities. General arts and science education accounted for 14.9 per cent of total enrolment. Health professions was 13.0 per cent, education 5.1 per cent, and fine arts was 2.4 per cent.

=== Campus suicides ===
The University of Toronto has faced significant criticism of its handling of student suicides and students' mental health problems. From 2017 to 2019, four students committed suicide at the school, three of them in the Bahen Centre for Information Technology by jumping off from the higher floors. Student advocacy groups have said that the university contributed to the suicides by failing to provide mental health resources, with computer science student Shahin Imtiaz saying in an interview that "the university has turned into a pressure-cooker of intense demands, without the resources to meet the student needs to back it up." While the university does not generally acknowledge student deaths as suicides, the university responded to the deaths by adding additional safety barriers to the Bahen Centre in 2021 and by promising additional support, adding close to three million dollars in funding for student wellbeing.

== Athletics ==
=== Varsity sports ===
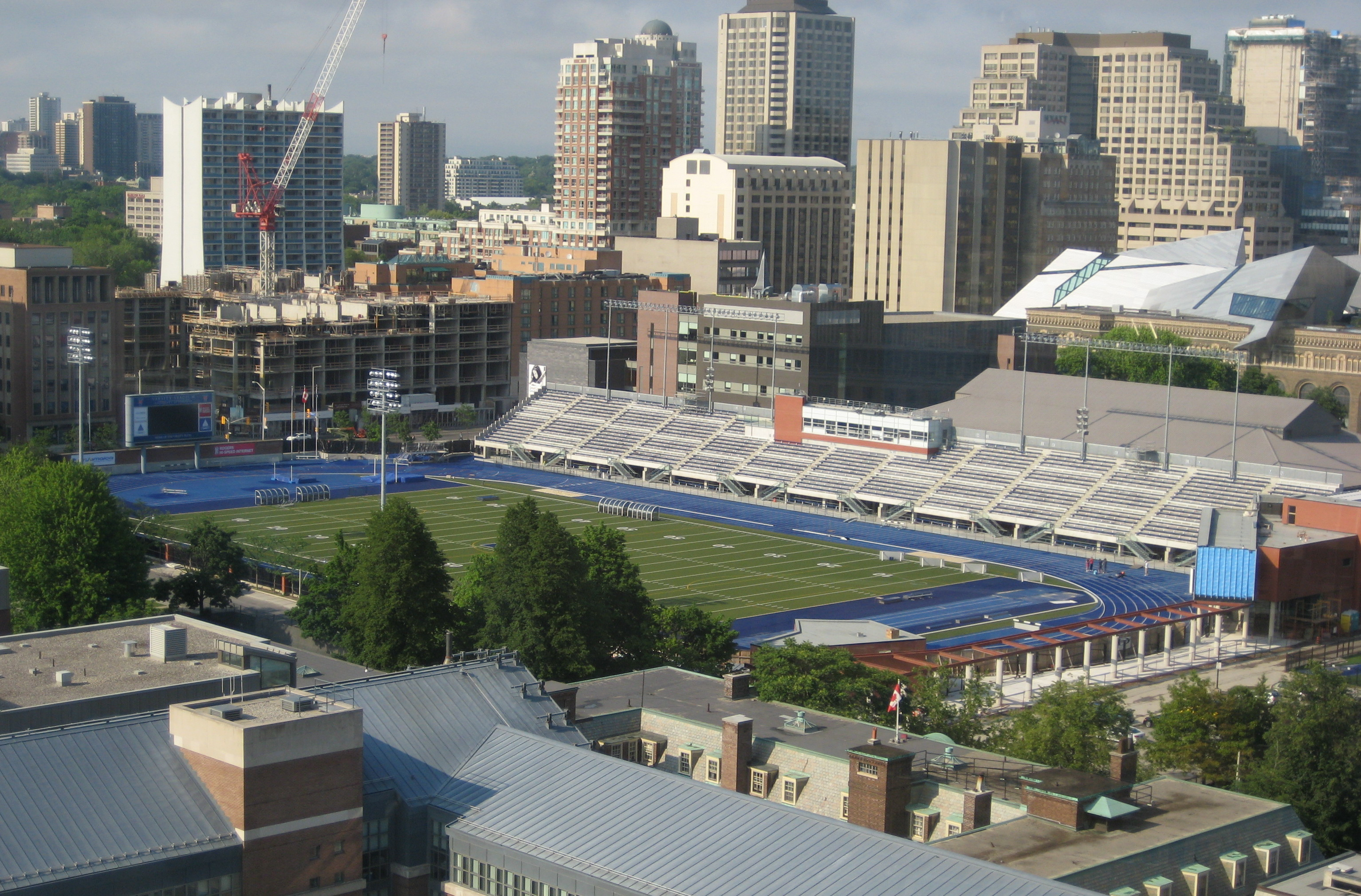
Varsity Stadium in 2009

The 44 sports teams of the Varsity Blues represent the university in intercollegiate competitions. The two main leagues in which the Blues participate are U Sports (formerly known as Canadian Interuniversity Sport (CIS)) for national competitions and the auxiliary Ontario University Athletics (OUA) conference at the provincial level. The athletic nickname of Varsity Blues was not consistently used until the 1930s; previously, references such as "Varsity", "The Big Blue", "The Blue and White", "The Varsity Blue" and simply "The Blues" also appeared interchangeably. "The Blue and White" is commonly played and sung in athletic games as a fight song. Students from any of the three campuses are eligible to play for the Varsity Blues.

North American (gridiron) football traces its very origin to the University of Toronto with the first documented football game played at University College on November 9, 1861. The Blues played their first intercollegiate football match in 1877 against the University of Michigan in a game that ended with a scoreless draw. Since intercollegiate seasons began in 1898, the Blues have won four Grey Cup, two Vanier Cup and 25 Yates Cup championships, including the inaugural championships for all three trophies. However, the football team has hit a rough patch following its last championship in 1993. From 2001 until 2008, the Blues suffered the longest losing streak in Canadian collegiate history, recording 49 consecutive winless games. This was preceded by a single victory in 2001 that ended a run of 18 straight losses. The site of Varsity Stadium has served as the primary playing grounds of the Varsity Blues football and soccer programs since 1898. It also served as the venue for archery during the 2015 Pan American Games.

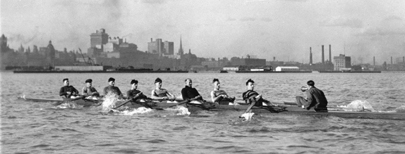
The University of Toronto Rowing Club's men's eight team trains in Toronto Harbour for the 1924 Summer Olympics in Paris. The team won silver in the men's eight event for Canada.

Formed in 1891, the storied Varsity Blues men's ice hockey team has left many legacies on the national, professional and international hockey scenes. Conn Smythe played for the Blues as a centre during his undergraduate years, and was a Blues coach from 1923 to 1926. When Smythe took over the Toronto Maple Leafs in 1927, his new team adopted the Varsity Blues' familiar blue-and-white sweater design. Blues hockey competed at the 1928 Winter Olympics and captured the gold medal for Canada. At the 1980 Winter Olympics, Blues coach Tom Watt served as co-coach of the Canadian hockey team in which six players were Varsity grads. In all, the Blues have won the U Sports University Cup national hockey title ten times, last in 1984. Varsity Arena has been the permanent home of the Blues ice hockey programs since it opened in 1926. In men's basketball, the Varsity Blues have won 14 conference titles, including the inaugural championship in 1909, but have not won a national title. In swimming, the men's team has claimed the national crown 16 times since 1964, while the women's team has claimed the crown 14 times since 1970. Established in 1897, the University of Toronto Rowing Club is Canada's oldest collegiate rowing club. It earned a silver medal for the country in the men's eight rowing event in the 1924 Summer Olympics in Paris, finishing second to Yale's crew.

=== Tri-Campus League and intramurals ===
During the First World War, intercollegiate varsity sports were temporarily suspended, however intramural competitions between colleges and divisions known as interfaculty sports were allowed to continue during this time, and thus gained popularity throughout the 1920s. The university's longest-running trophy, the Jennings Cup, has been disputed by interfaculty men's ice hockey teams since 1898. At a level of competition below the Varsity Blues, teams from each of the three campuses compete in the Tri-Campus League, the highest level of intramural competition at the university. The Mississauga and Scarborough campuses have one Tri-Campus team each (nicknamed the Eagles and Maroons, respectively) while the St. George campus has two all-star teams, known as St. George Red and Blue.

== Notable people ==
In addition to Havelock, Innis, Frye, Carpenter and McLuhan, former professors of the 20th century include Frederick Banting, Harold Scott MacDonald Coxeter, Robertson Davies, John Charles Fields, Leopold Infeld and C. B. Macpherson. 12 Nobel laureates studied or taught at the University of Toronto. As of 2006, University of Toronto academics accounted for 15 of 23 Canadian members in the American Academy of Arts and Sciences (65 per cent) and 20 of 72 Canadian fellows in the American Association for the Advancement of Science (28 per cent). Among honorees from Canada between 1980 and 2006, University of Toronto faculty made up 11 of 21 Canada Gairdner International Award recipients (52 per cent), 44 of 101 Guggenheim Fellows (44 per cent), 16 of 38 Royal Society fellows (42 per cent), 10 of 28 members in the United States National Academies (36 per cent) and 23 of 77 Sloan Research Fellows (30 per cent).

Alumni of the University of Toronto's campuses, colleges, faculties and professional schools have assumed notable roles in a wide range of fields and specialties. In government, Governors General Vincent Massey, Adrienne Clarkson, and Julie Payette, Prime Ministers William Lyon Mackenzie King, Arthur Meighen, Lester B. Pearson, Paul Martin and Stephen Harper, and 17 justices of the Supreme Court have all graduated from the university, while world leaders include President of Latvia Vaira Vīķe-Freiberga, Premier of the Republic of China Liu Chao-shiuan, President of Trinidad and Tobago Noor Hassanali, and First Lady of Iceland Eliza Reid. Economist John Kenneth Galbraith, political scientist David Easton, historian Margaret MacMillan, philosophers David Gauthier and Ted Honderich, anthropologist Davidson Black, social activist Ellen Pence, sociologist Erving Goffman, psychologists Endel Tulving, Daniel Schacter, and Lisa Feldman Barrett, physicians Norman Bethune and Charles Best, geologists Joseph Tyrrell and John Tuzo Wilson, mathematicians Irving Kaplansky and William Kahan, physicists Arthur Leonard Schawlow and Bertram Brockhouse, religion scholar Amir Hussain, architect James Strutt, engineer Gerald Bull, computer scientists Alfred Aho and Brian Kernighan, and astronauts Roberta Bondar and Julie Payette are also some of the most well-known academic figures from the university.

In literature and media, the university has produced writers Stephen Leacock, John McCrae, Rohinton Mistry, Margaret Atwood and Michael Ondaatje, film directors Arthur Hiller, Norman Jewison, David Cronenberg and Atom Egoyan, actor Donald Sutherland, screenwriter David Shore, television producer and writer Hart Hanson, musician Paul Shaffer, and journalists Malcolm Gladwell, Naomi Klein and Barbara Amiel.

In business, University of Toronto alumni include Rogers Communications' Ted Rogers, Toronto-Dominion Bank's W. Edmund Clark, Bank of Montreal's Bill Downe, Scotiabank's Peter Godsoe, Barrick Gold's Peter Munk, BlackBerry's Jim Balsillie, eBay's Jeffrey Skoll, Fiat S.p.A.'s Sergio Marchionne, and Apotex's Bernard Sherman.

The University of Toronto alumni-founded companies generate roughly equivalent to one-quarter of the Canadian GDP according to a survey published in 2021.

== See also ==
- Education in Toronto
- Higher education in Ontario
- List of universities in Canada
