= University of Toronto Rowing Club =

Rowing team of the University of Toronto

- Home water: Lake Ontario
- Founded: 1897; 129 years ago
- University: University of Toronto
- Conference: OUA
- Website: varsityblues.ca/rowing

The University of Toronto Rowing Club (UTRC) was founded on February 10, 1897 and represents the Varsity Blues at local and international regattas. It is the oldest university rowing club in Canada.

The UTRC consists of both a women's team and a men's team, and each team offers a lightweight and an open (heavyweight) category. Membership is exclusively available to registered full-time students at the University of Toronto, and it is open to athletes of various of experience from novice to Olympic level rowers.

The club colours are U of T Blue and white, as are the colours of all other varsity sports teams at the university.

== Competitions ==
The club participates in the Ontario University Athletics (OUA) conference in the Novice, Junior Varsity and Varsity levels of competition. Although UTRC competes at regattas and competitions from September until May, the OUA fall season is the primary focus. Regattas and competitions that UTRC attend annually include:

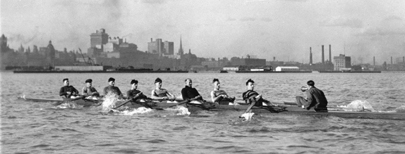
Toronto rowing team in 1924

- Western Invitational Regatta
- Head of the Trent
- Brock Invitational Regatta
- Head of the Charles Regatta
- Ontario University Development Regatta
- OUA Championship Regatta
- Canadian University Rowing Championships
- Canadian Indoor Rowing Championships
- Toronto-McGill Boat Race

== Notable Blues ==
- Ned Hanlan - Nicknamed the "boy in blue" during his racing career, he won more than 300 races (including exhibitions) with fewer than a dozen defeats. He had become one of Canada's “first national sporting hero”, winning the American and English Championships as well as becoming the world champion for five consecutive years from 1880-1884 in single-scull rowing. Ned Hanlan was the UTRC's first Head coach, from 1897 until 1900.
- Emma Robinson - She began her rowing career in 1990 as a member of the University of Toronto Women's Novice Crew. Within three years, she won Gold at the Dad Vail Regatta (1991), Gold at the Royal Canadian Henley Regatta (1992), Gold (eights) and Silver (fours) at the World University Games (1993), and a Bronze medal at the World Championships (1993). She was then recruited onto the Canadian National Rowing Team, where she was a member of the Silver-winning eights at the 1996 Olympics. She went on to win Gold medals at the Head of the Charles, the World Cup, Pan American Games, and the World Championships. She was named the Ontario Female Athlete of the Year in 1999.
- Richard Symsyk - Also starting his career at UTRC, he was a key member of the 1963 intercollegiate championship crew and the 1964 junior Varsity champions. Richard won 19 Canadian National Championships, 5 U.S. National Championships and was a member of Olympic crews for both the 1968 Mexico City Games and the 1972 Games in Munich. In 1972, Richard also claimed a Henley Royal Regatta (UK) championship in the men's fours. As a master's rower, he won two Master's Games Championships in 1985, five International Master's Championship in 1984 and 1985, and a Henley Championship in 1990.
- Michael Braithwaite - 2012 London Olympian in heavyweight men's double.
