= Heraldry of McGill University =

Official seal and coat of arms of McGill University

Arms of McGill University
- Armiger: McGill University
- Adopted: 1975; 51 years ago
- Shield: Argent three martlets Gules on a chief dancetty Gules an open book proper garnished Or bearing the legend IN DOMINO CONFIDO in letters Sable between two crowns fleurdelisées Argent;
- Motto: Grandescunt Aucta Labore (Latin) "By work, all things increase and grow" (English translation)
- Designer: Percy Nobbs
- Registered with the Canadian Heraldic Authority on June 12, 1992.

The coat of arms of McGill University is the official emblem of the university and derives from a heraldic device assumed during the lifetime of the university's founder, James McGill. The first iteration was designed in 1906 by Percy Nobbs, then director of the McGill School of Architecture. The design subsequently varied for decades after until the university's current coat of arms, largely resembling the original design, was finally adopted by the Board of Governors in 1975. Today, the university has approved multiple logos across its faculties and departments, including a separate coat of arms used by the Macdonald Campus.

== McGill University coat of arms, wordmark and colours ==
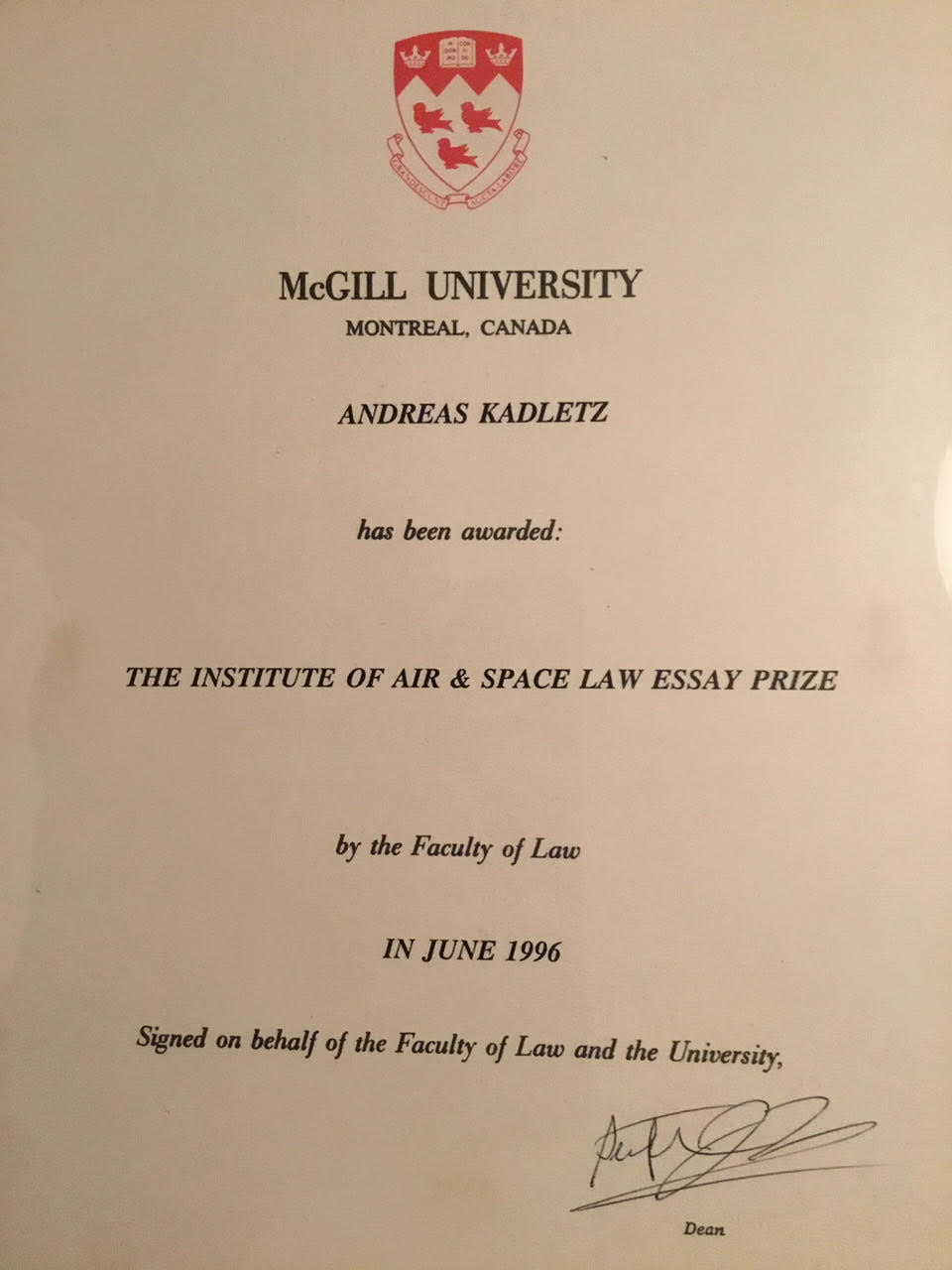
Award certificate from 1996 with McGill's coat of arms at the top

=== Coat of arms ===
The McGill University heraldic achievement comprises a shield with a scroll beneath it. It is derived from an armorial device assumed during his lifetime by the university's founder, James McGill.

==== Shield ====
The shield is divided into two sections. The lower section contains three red martlets on a silver background. The martlets were taken from the arms of the McGill family, and are always shown in flight due to the heraldic martlet being a mythical bird without legs. Above this section is a red banner representing Montreal's surrounding mountains. The banner contains two silver crowns composed of fleur de lis representing Montreal's royal history and French origin. Separating these crowns is an open book, the heraldic symbol of an institution of learning, bearing the words In Domino Confido ("I trust in the Lord"), which was a motto used by James McGill.

==== Scroll ====
The scroll below the shield contains the university's official motto, Grandescunt Aucta Labore ("By work all things increase and grow"). According to the McGill University secretariat, the scroll's usage is optional, and should only be used when the coat of arms stands alone and is large enough that the Latin words of the motto are legible.

=== History of the arms ===
McGill University's coat of arms was first designed in 1906 by Percy Erskine Nobbs, then director of the McGill School of Architecture. Despite many varying designs over the last century, Nobbs' original design largely resembles that which is used today: a shield divided into two sections, the top containing two silver crowns separated by an open book with the Latin words In Domino Confido ("I trust in the Lord") on a red band, and the lower section containing three red martlets on a silver background. Beneath the shield is a scroll containing the words Grandescunt Aucta Labore ("By work all things increase and grow"), which is the university's official motto.

Nobbs' design was patented in 1922 by the Garter King-at-Arms in London, England, thus establishing the university's right to the arms. However, the university did not formally adopt its arms until 1975, and until then the design had sometimes been employed with reverse colors, a single crown, varying martlet designs, multiple mottos and/or a surrounding banner with the Latin words Universitas Collegii McGill Monte Regio. The current coat of arms used by the university was adopted by the Board of Governors in November 1975.

In 1956, Lord Lyon King-at-Arms of Edinburgh granted a posthumous coat of arms to James McGill. The same year, the coat of arms was also registered in the Public Register of all Arms and Bearings in Scotland. In 1992, the coat of arms was registered with the Chief Herald of Canada. The McGill University Secretariat governs the use of McGill's logos and branding, and it has a policy to ensure their correct use.

=== Wordmark ===
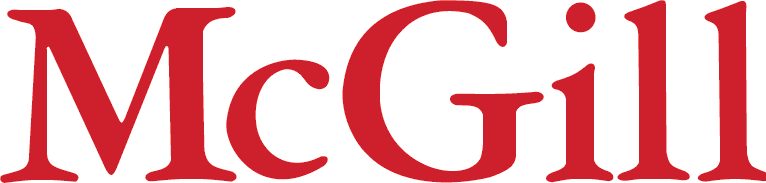
McGill's official wordmark

McGill University's wordmark is the word 'McGill' in a custom font derived from Garamond. It is thus not possible to reproduce the wordmark using standard printing fonts.

=== Colours ===
McGill University's official colour is red, specifically PMS 485 (CMYK: 100% magenta, 90% yellow) for printed work. The coat of arms in full colour would be printed in the following colours: PMS 485 for the martlets, PMS 871U for the gold book and PMS 877U for the silver crowns. The RGB value is R237, G27, B47 or Hexadecimal value #ed1b2f for electronic display.

== MacDonald Campus coat of arms ==
McGill University's second campus, the Macdonald Campus, has its own coat of arms. It is partly derived from the arms of Sir William Macdonald, who founded the campus, and it also borrows from the university's coat of arms.

The Macdonald Campus emblem consists of a shield with a scroll beneath it, like the university's emblem. The lower section of the shield contains a red hand holding a cross with two martlets on either side, all on a gold background. The upper section contains an open book with the university's motto in between two gold clover leaves, all on a green background.

The martlets and book are borrowed from the university's coat of arms, while the hand and cross are derived from the second quarter of Macdonald's arms. The clover leaves represent fertility, and their three segments represent the three purposes of the campus – agriculture, food and service. Underneath the shield is a scroll with the words 'Mastery for Service'.

The MacDonald Campus arms were originally designed in 1939 by Dr. W. Whitehead. They were subsequently redesigned in October 1978 by Dr. R.B. Buckland, with assistance from J. Marok.

== Other McGill logos ==
=== Named faculties ===
McGill's named faculties have their own logos, such as the Desautels Faculty of Management and the Schulich School of Music.

=== Athletics and Recreation ===
McGill Athletics and Recreation have their own approved logo, which involves the superimposition of the McGill crest onto the capitalized letter "M".

== See also ==
- Armorial of Canadian universities
- Academic dress of McGill University
- Coat of arms of the University of Toronto
