= Coat of arms of the University of Toronto =

Heraldic symbol of Canadian university

Arms of the University of Toronto
- Armiger: University of Toronto
- Adopted: 1857; 169 years ago
- Crest: An oak tree Or leaved Vert fructed Or
- Shield: Azure two open books above a beaver statant proper, on a chief Argent the Royal Crown proper
- Motto: Velut arbor ævo
- Designer: Sir Daniel Wilson
- Registered with the Canadian Heraldic Authority on May 20, 2016.

The coat of arms of the University of Toronto is the primary emblem of the University of Toronto, the oldest university in Ontario. It is currently used in several different contexts by the University and can be seen on the University banner, as part of the heraldic achievement of the University, or featured in the logos of the University's campuses, faculties, and departments, as well as the logo of the University as a whole. The coat of arms is rarely used on its own.

Despite its varied usage, modification of the coat of arms is extremely rare, as its use is strictly controlled by the University's Office of International, Governmental, and Institutional Relations. Several University divisions, notably the colleges, have their own emblems, and they do not regularly use the University coat of arms.

The motto, which is not itself part of the arms but of the overall heraldic achievement, is velut arbor ævo, Latin for "[may it grow] as a tree through the ages". This phrase originates from Horace's Odes, book I, ode 12, line 45: crescit occulto velut arbor ævo fama Marcelli ("the fame of Marcellus grows like a tree over time unseen").

== Blazon ==
The blazon of the University coat of arms is as follows:

Azure two open Books and in base a Beaver all proper, upon a Chief Argent the Royal and Imperial Crown also proper, and for the crest on a wreath of the colours an Oak tree proper stemmed and fructed Or.

The armorial bearings of the University are blazoned by the Canadian Heraldic Authority as follows:

- Arms: Azure two open books above a beaver statant proper, on a chief Argent the Royal Crown proper;
- Crest: An oak tree Or leaved Vert fructed Or;
- Motto: VELUT ARBOR ӔVO (Latin for "As a tree, over time")

== History ==
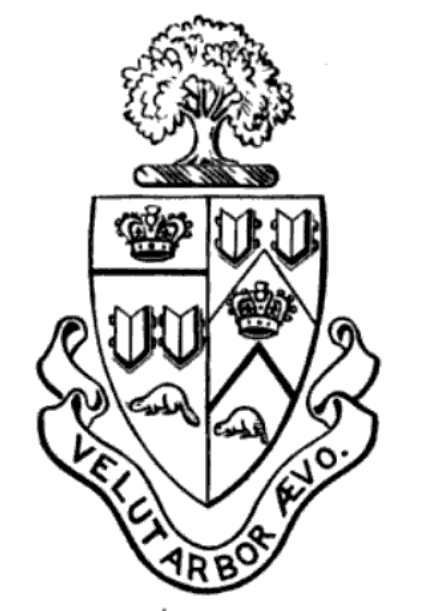
A version of the coat of arms as it appears in an 1892 publication

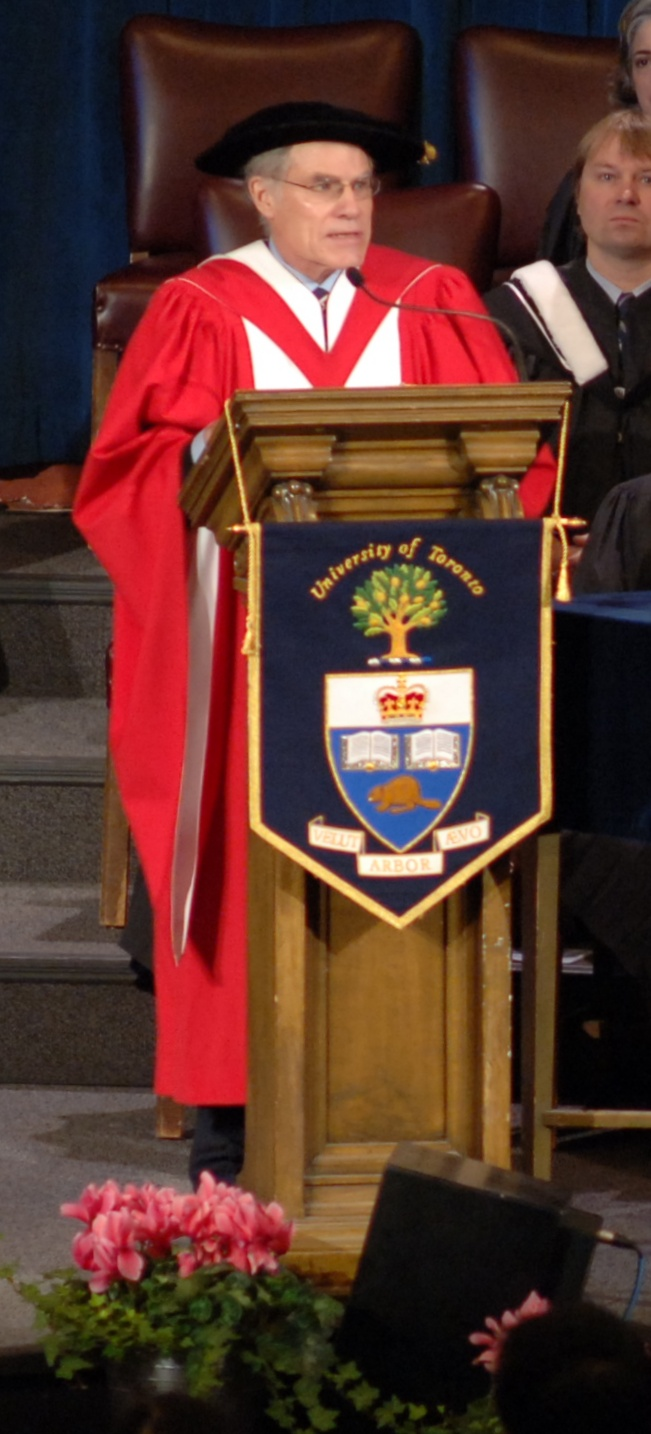
The University of Toronto coat of arms displayed on a podium during convocation

The University of Toronto coat of arms was originally designed in 1857 by Sir Daniel Wilson, who later became the University's third president. From that point on, the general design has remained largely unchanged. There have been minor alterations, such as the loss of the original supporters (Minerva and Victoria) and the transformation of the beaver from an aggressive to a more benign charge over time. The latter was described by University graphic designer Caz Zyvatkauskas in 2000 as the "emasculation of the U of T beaver".

In 1917, owing to a lack of uniformity among the coats of arms on campus due to decades of lax regulation, the board of governors petitioned the College of Arms to create an official description of the University coat of arms. The result was the current blazon, quoted in the preceding section. The arms of University College were completed at the same time. Both arms cost the University a combined £89, six shillings. It was at this time that the crest of the University, which was originally a maple tree, became an oak tree.

The armorial bearings of the University of Toronto were registered with the Canadian Heraldic Authority on May 20, 2016.

== Associated emblems ==
The University of Toronto contains many divisions, some of which use emblems distinct from those of the University. Some University divisions were founded as independent institutions and were later absorbed into the University. This, as well as the different aesthetics of those eras during which the emblems were designed, accounts for the difference in styles used by each institution.

== See also ==
- Armorial of Canadian universities
- U of T Blue
- True Blue (mascot)
- Academic dress of the University of Toronto
- Heraldry of McGill University
