= Academic dress of McGill University =

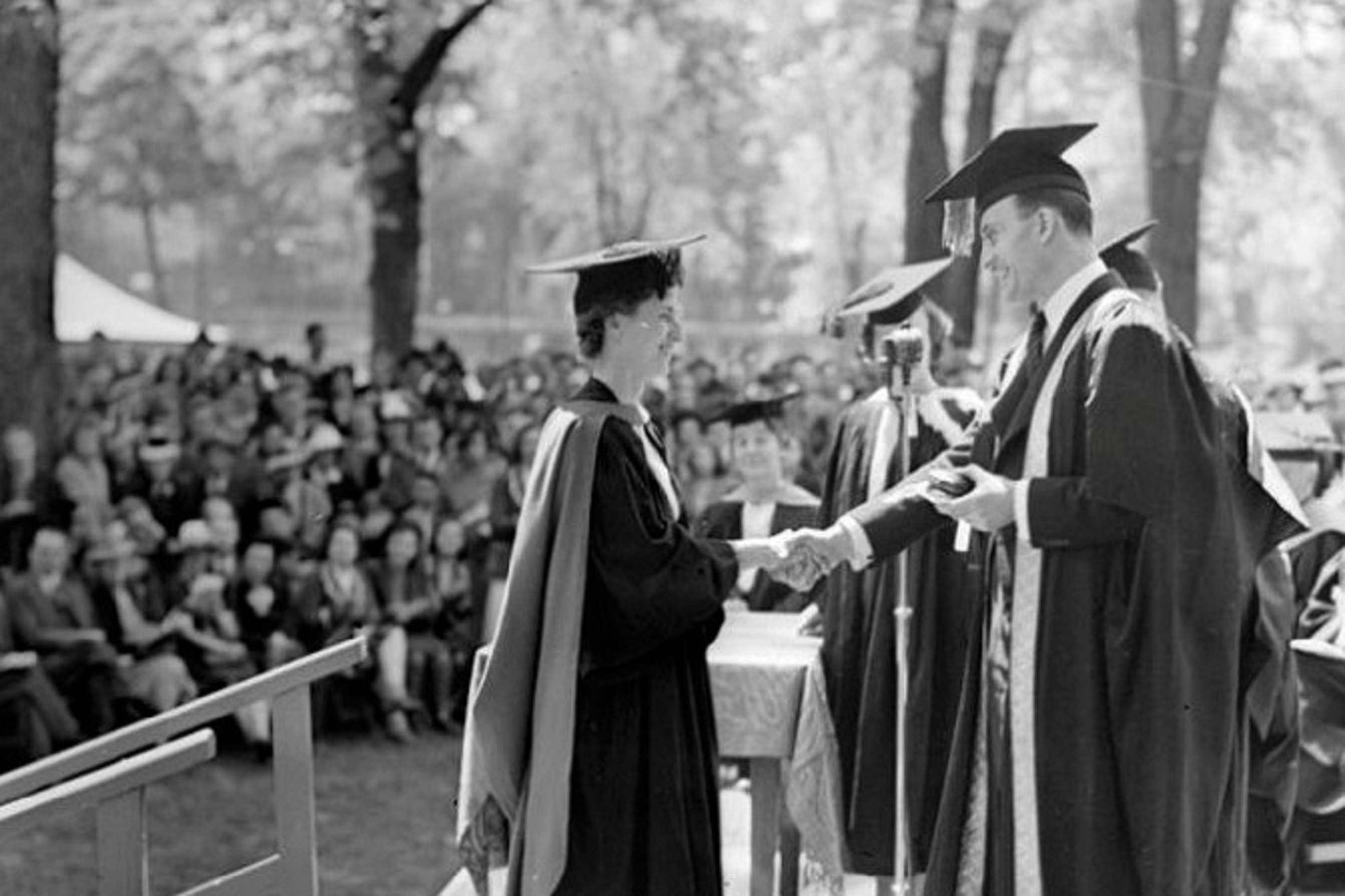
Graduation ceremony at McGill University, circa 1940

The academic dress of McGill University describes the caps, gowns and hoods which are prescribed by the university for its degree candidates/holders. Until the mid-20th century, McGill also prescribed academic dress for its matriculating or enrolled students as well as its faculty.

== History ==
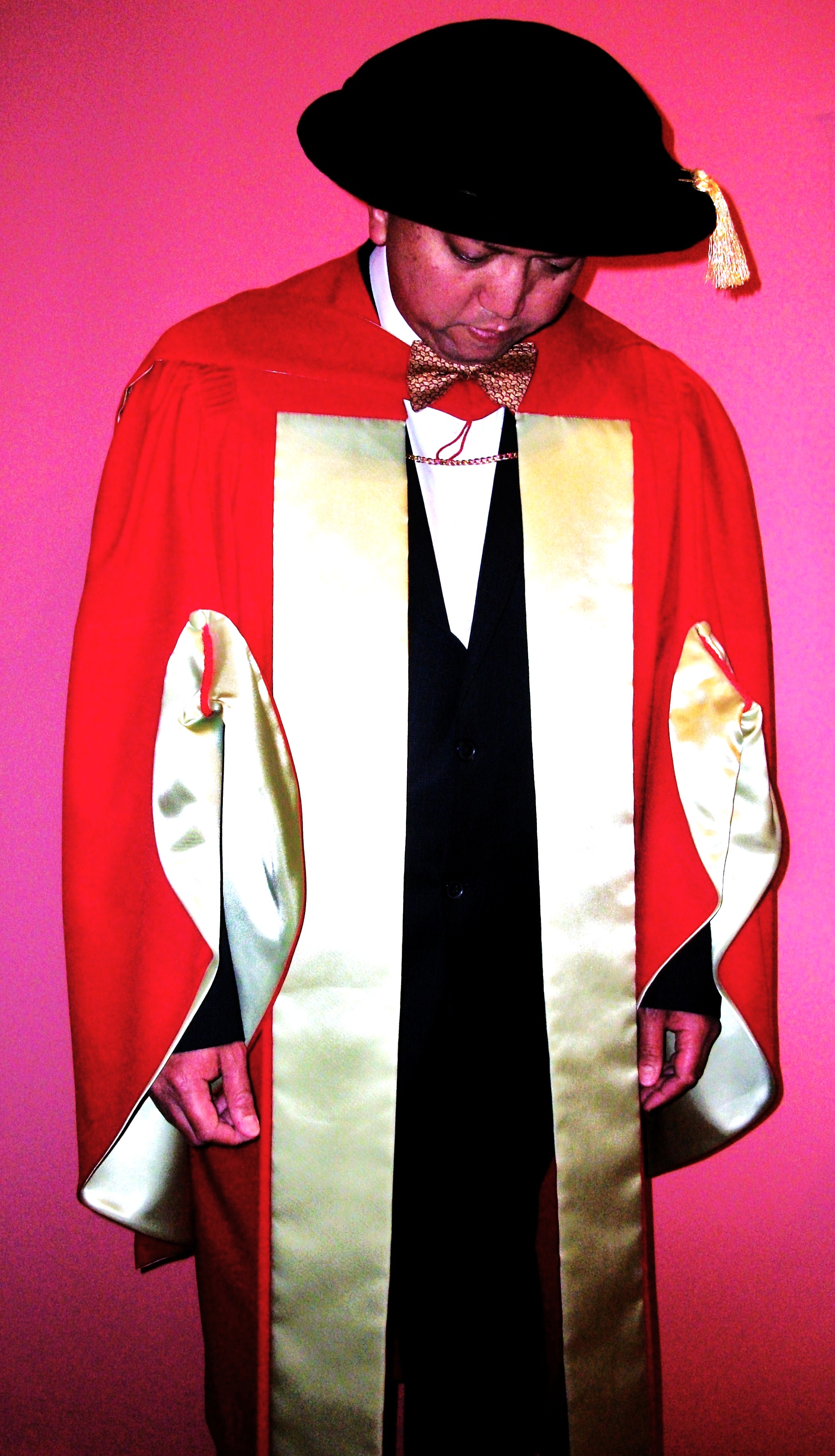
McGill's scarlet PhD academic dress

Academic regalia has been part of university life at McGill since it started offering classes in the 1820s at its historic Montreal campus on the flank of Mount Royal. Academic dress was adapted in 1843, based (like that of other Canadian universities of the period) on the academic dress of the University of Oxford, but with changes to students' dress: McGill commoners wore the Oxford scholars' gown; scholars wore the commoners' gown of King's College Toronto, students in law and medicine wore the Cambridge BA gown, and students in medicine wore a "plain rose coloured silk hood". This predated the reintroduction of academic hoods at the Scottish universities, which served as McGill's model, in the 1860s (although Edinburgh introduced a hood specifically for doctors of medicine in 1843 to wear on public occasions, but not at their graduation), and the codification of academic regalia in the United States through the Intercollegiate Code of Academic Costume that most American colleges and universities adopted in the late 1890s. Until the 1930s, McGill observed the British tradition of requiring its faculty and students to be attired in academic robes for classes and lectures, "except in those cases in which a dispensation shall have been granted by the faculty." McGill's renowned political economy professor, Stephen Leacock, was often remembered for his black, tattered robe that "had grown greenish with age," but which he wore to the classroom without fail each day, raising concerns among his fellow professors and students that it could one day cause him injury.

Academic dress at McGill was traditionally differentiated in accordance with the wearer's status and degree. In 1879, the academic dress in arts was still similar to that of Oxford, differentiated by edgings. The BA hood was lined with fur, as at Oxford, but had a 1.5-inch crimson edging. Similarly, the MA hood was lined with crimson silk, as at Oxford, but had a 1.5-inch white edging. The BA gown had "full sleeve looped at elbow and terminating in a point", while the MA gown is described as "as above, with long sleeve with semicircular cut at the bottom". The Bachelor of Applied Science, Master of Applied Science and Master of Engineering had hoods of "rich mauve", lined with rabbit skin for the bachelor and white silk for both masters. The BCL had a silk gown and a lilac silk hood, lined white silk with a 1.5-inch crimson edging. Doctors of laws wore the MA gown in undress, while doctors of civil law and of medicine wore the BCL gown and doctors of divinity wore a silk gown with full bag-sleeves. Only doctors of laws, civil law and medicine had a full dress scarlet robe, "similar to that of the University of Cambridge"; the facings or linings were not specified. The DCL, LLD and MD all used hoods of scarlet cloth lined with pink silk, distinguished by an edging of black velvet for the DCL, white satin for the LLD and purple for the MD.

By 1906, almost all of this had changed. Matriculating undergraduates had to attend classes in "plain, black stuff gown, not falling below the knee, with round sleeve cut above the elbow". Bachelors wore gowns falling below their knees with full sleeves cut to the elbow of the same pattern as the Cambridge BA ([b2]). Masters wore gowns of the same pattern as the Cambridge MA, with a semi-circular cut toward the bottom of the sleeve; the same gown was worn by doctors in undress. Doctors of laws, science, literature, and civil law wore the university's scarlet full dress, patterned on the full dress robes of Doctors of Laws at Cambridge, originally made of scarlet cloth, "faced with silk of the same colour as the lining of their respective hoods". Doctors' hoods were in scarlet, while masters' and bachelor's hoods were black, the latter being distinguished by the edging of fur. The silk linings of the hoods followed a faculty colour system, with pale blue silk for the BA, MA and DLitt, yellow silk for the BSc, MSc and DSc, and French grey silk for the BCL, and DCL. The LLD hood was lined with white silk and the MD hood with dark blue silk.

Faculty and students at McGill in the early 20th centuries were required to wear academic dress to classes and lectures. All graduates had square academic caps, described in the university calendar as "the ordinary black trencher with black tassel". Doctors degree holders in full dress wore "a black, velvet hat with gold chord, similar to that worn by Doctors of Laws of Cambridge University", i.e., a Tudor bonnet.

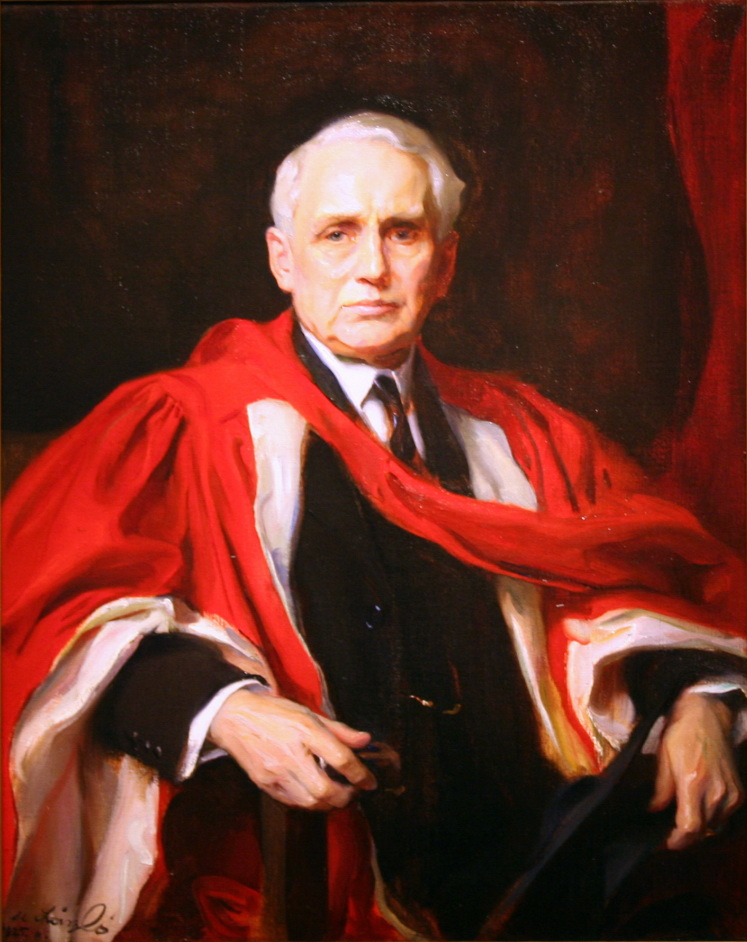
Oil portrait (1913) of United States Secretary of State Frank B. Kellogg in McGill doctoral gown

McGill academic gowns were traditionally made of stuff, Prince's stuff (wool cloth mixed with silk) or silk, while the fur linings formerly used on bachelor's hoods were made from rabbit's fur.

Among the oldest existing McGill regalia is a complete set from 1864 consisting of a black mortarboard, black gown and scarlet hood lined with pink silk, held by the McCord Museum in Montreal.

== Current regulations for academic dress ==
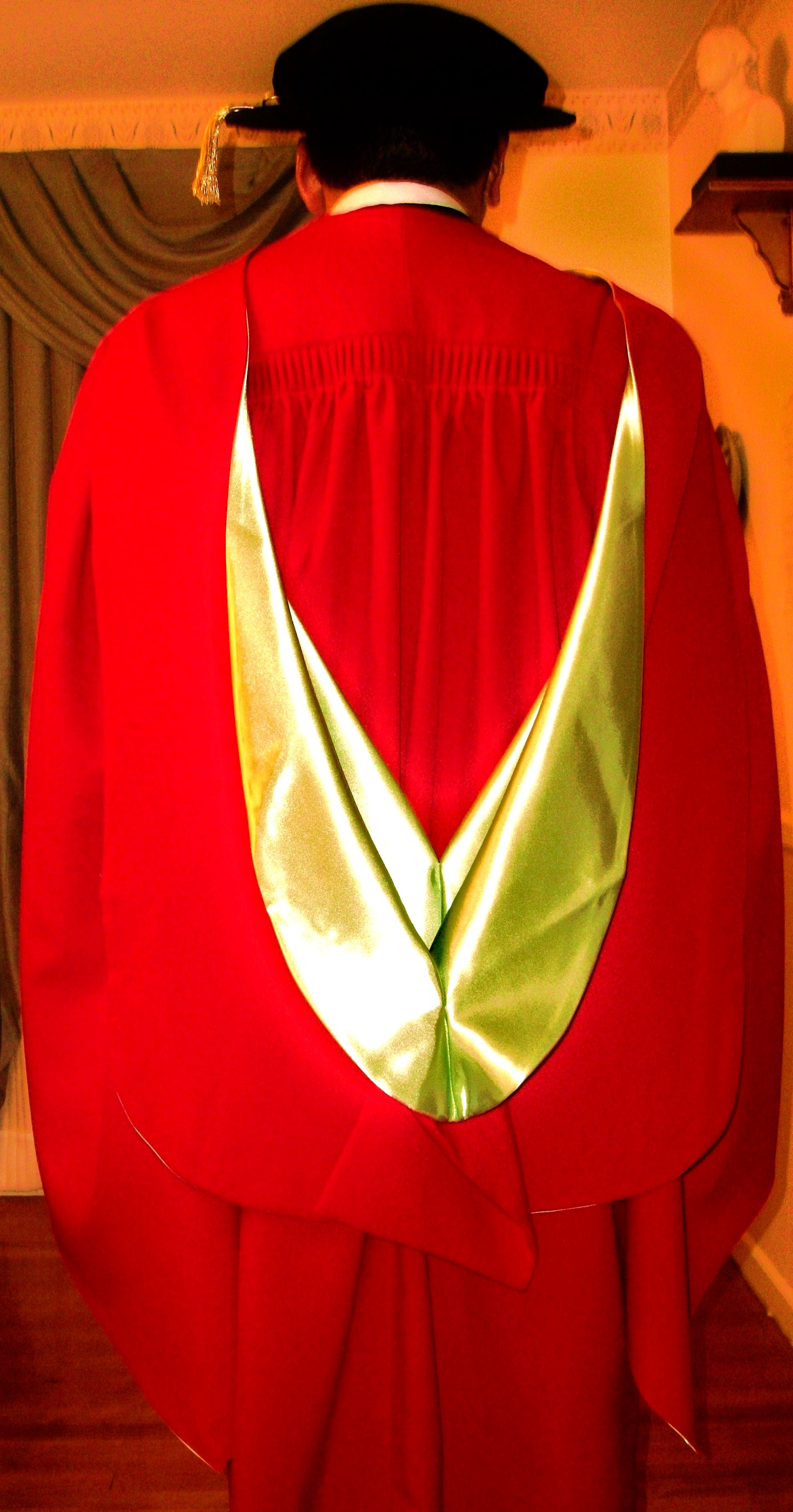
Silk-lined hood of the McGill doctoral regalia

Academic dress at McGill has not changed much since the early 20th century, with only three notable changes having evolved since that time. The first was the removal of the academic dress requirements for faculty and students during classes and lectures starting in the mid-1930s. Academic dress is currently worn only at commencement and special convocations, such as the installations of the university's principal and chancellor and the inauguration of endowed chairs. A second development was further additions to the silk lining colours that denote the wearer's field of study. This became necessary as McGill offered more and newer fields in its curriculum, such as nutrition, physical therapy, occupational therapy and urban planning, particularly since the 1960s. A third innovation was the option, introduced in 2001, of wearing the scarlet PhD regalia partly closed-front and hooked, which departs from the totally open-gown style of the University of Cambridge full dress for its PhDs and higher doctorates.

Current regulations at McGill ceremonies are:

- Non-degree certificate and diploma: Black gown, without any hood (although those already have a degree may wear the hood of that degree).
- Bachelor: Black gown, black hood lined with the distinctive colour of the degree and bordered in white.
- Master: Black gown, black hood lined with the distinctive colour of the degree.
- Doctorate, other than PhD (e.g., MD, CM and DMD): Black gown, scarlet hood lined with the distinctive colour of the degree.
- PhD: Scarlet gown with pale green facing, hood lined in pale green silk, and Tudor bonnet.
- Honorary doctorate: The PhD scarlet gown, with facing and hood silk lining in the colour of the field of honor, and Tudor bonnet.

Since 2001, First Nations, Inuit, and Métis students receiving degrees have also had a red scarf bearing a feather and the Confederacy Belt, while those receiving certificates and diplomas have had a white scarf bearing an eagle feather and a turtle, both with the seal of the university on the nape. Indigenous students are also permitted to wear traditional Indigenous regalia rather than the gown of their degree.

In addition, designated university convocation marshals wear grey ceremonial gowns and hoods lined in scarlet and Tudor bonnets at convocations and other formal ceremonies.

== Colours of hood linings ==
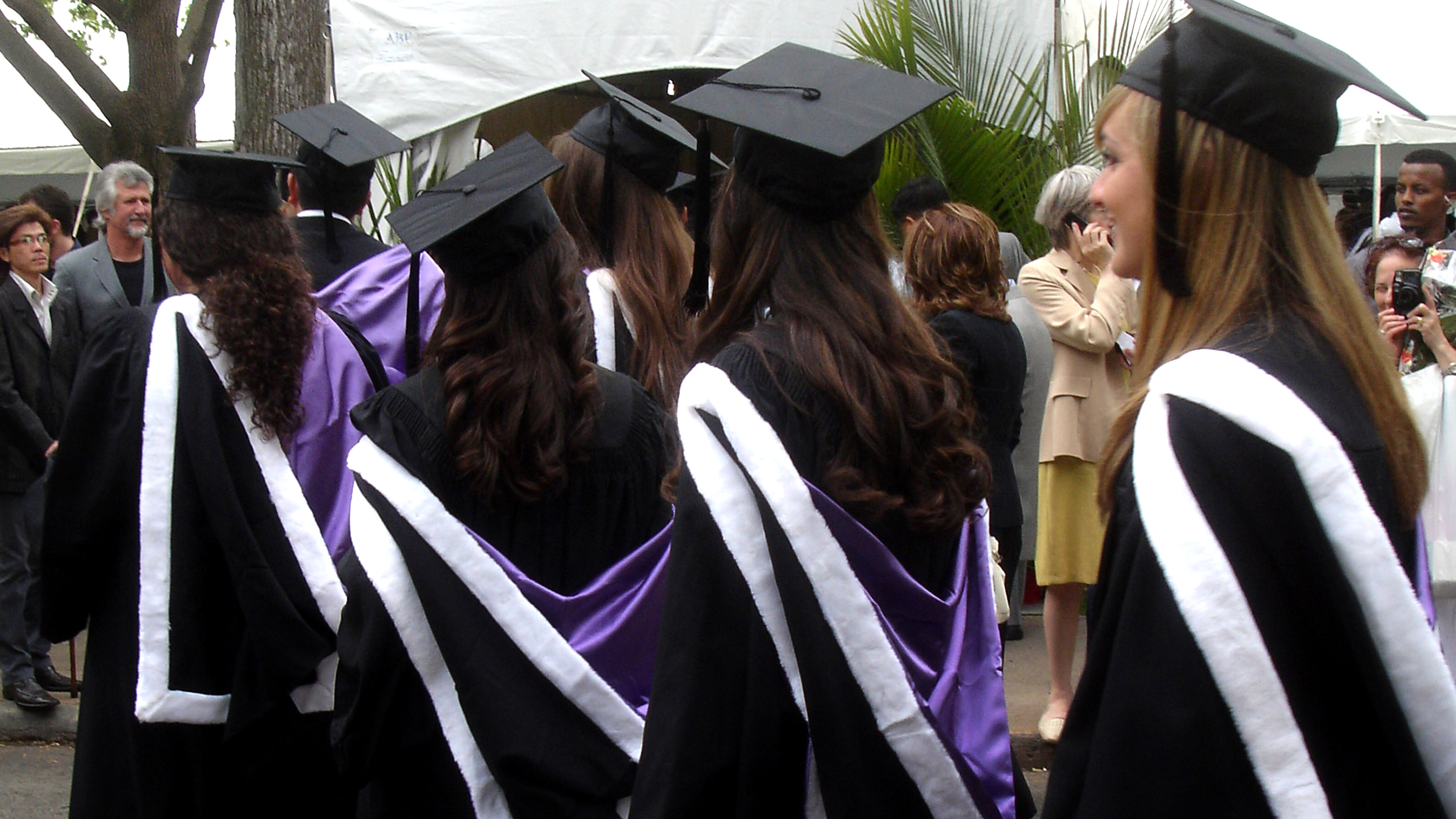
Bachelor's degrees previously used fur-lined hoods as shown here rather than the white edging currently specified. The purple silk lining identifies the field as commerce or business administration and thus the degrees as bachelors of commerce.

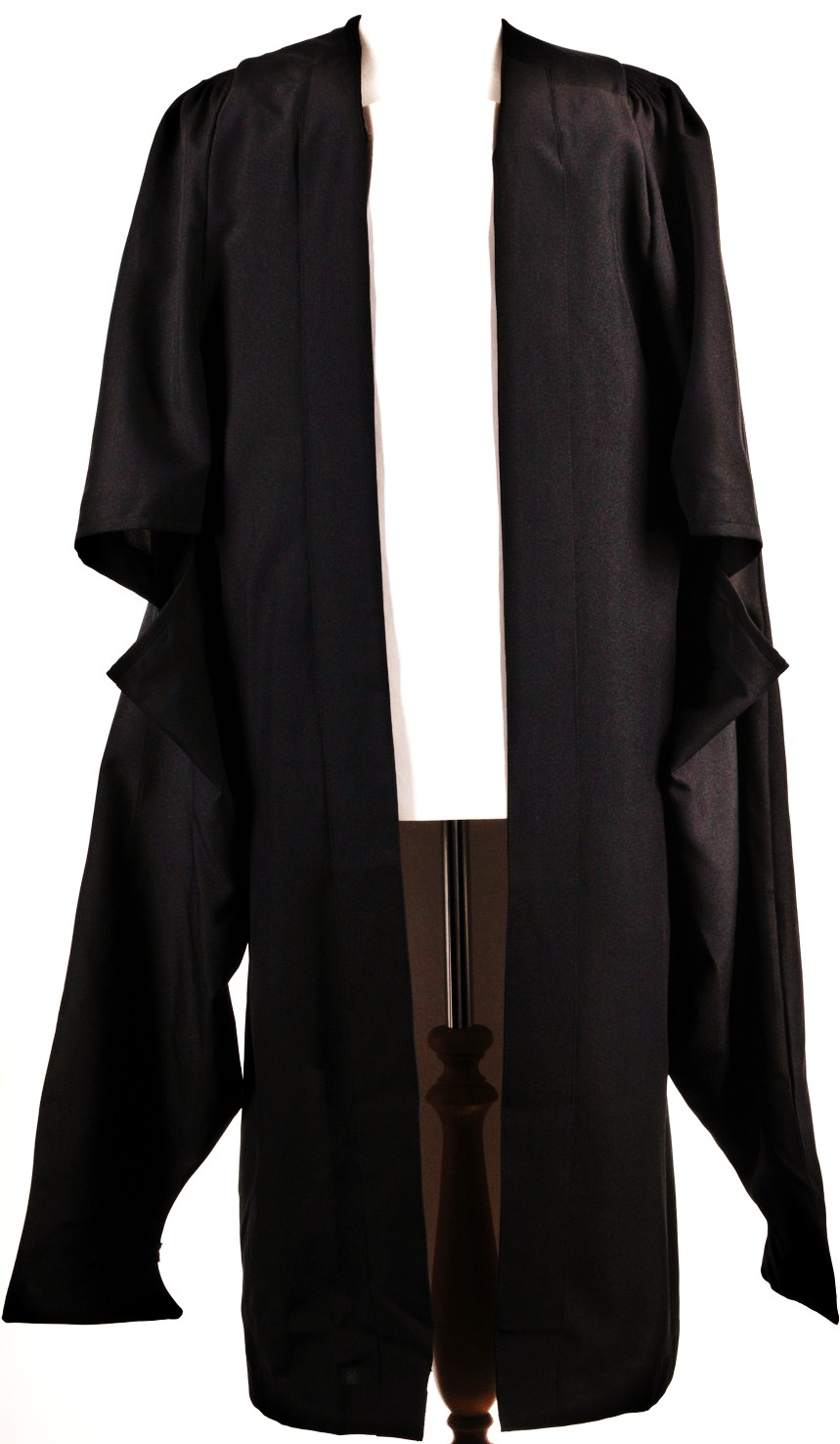
Master's degree robe with square sleeves slit above the elbow and a crescent-shaped cutout at the back of the boot

The colour(s) of the silk linings for McGill hoods represents the field of study of the degree.

FIELD OF STUDY/FACULTY	COLOUR(S)
Architecture	White
Arts	Pale blue
Arts and science	Yellow and pale blue
Arts (education)	Peacock blue and pale blue
Civil law	Grey
Commerce and business administration	Purple
Dental medicine	Pink
Education	Peacock blue
Engineering	Scarlet
Information studies	Orange
Laws	Grey; front strap braided with green
LLB/BCL	Grey; front strap braided with red above and green below
Management	Gold
Medicine	Dark blue
Music	Mauve
Nursing	Dark blue
Philosophy	Pale green
Science	Yellow
Science (agricultural and environmental sciences)	Dark green
Science (agriculture engineering)	Dark green and scarlet
Science (applied)	Yellow and pale green
Science (architecture)	Yellow and white
Science (food science)	Jade green
Science (kinesiology)	Coral
Science (nursing)	Dark blue and scarlet
Science (nutritional sciences)	Beige and dark blue
Science (Occupational Therapy)	Half beige/half bright green
Science (rehabilitation sciences)	Dark blue and yellow
Social work	Fuchsia
Software engineering	Scarlet and yellow
Theology	Blue purple
Urban planning	Bright green and dark blue

== University officials ==
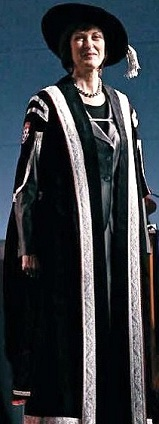
Ceremonial regalia of McGill's principal and chief executive

The distinctive robes worn by McGill University's chancellor, principal, and chair of the board of directors (who could also be the chancellor) are variants of the university's master's gown, with its square slit below the shoulders.

The chancellor's robe features gold trims and facings. The principal's trims and facings are in silvery-white. As the university's chief executive, the sleeves of the principal's robe are also embroidered with the university's coat of arms.

University officials' robes are worn open and without hoods. Their black caps are either velvet mortarboards or Tudor bonnets, both of which are adorned with thicker-strand tassels – in gold for the chancellor and in silvery-white for the principal.

== See also ==
- Academic dress of the University of Toronto
