= U of T Blue =

Shade of blue used by the University of Toronto

- The Quercus of the U of T coat of arms

Colour coordinates
- Hex triplet: #1E3765
- sRGB^{B} (r, g, b): (30, 55, 101)
- HSV (h, s, v): (219°, 70%, 40%)
- CIELCh_{uv} (L, C, h): (23, 38, 255°)
- Source: University of Toronto Brand Guidelines
- ISCC–NBS descriptor: Deep blue
- B: Normalized to [0–255] (byte)

U of T Blue is the navy blue shade of colour used in association with and by the University of Toronto. The university's official branding guidelines define the colour as Pantone PMS 655, equivalent to the hex code #1E3765. In all official branding and communications on campus and online, it serves as the sole primary colour.

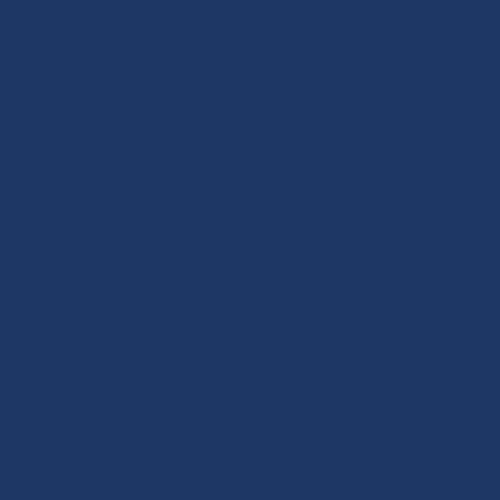
U of T Blue #1E3765

== History ==
According to the university's brand guidelines, the colour "represents the University's history, legacy, reputation, and excellence both locally and internationally," and has been used to represent the university since its foundation in 1827 as King's College, modelled after the similar colour used to represent the University of Oxford in England. The University of Toronto's official branding guidelines define U of T Blue as Pantone PMS 655, which parallels that of Oxford, but differs from other university dark blue colours such as Yale Blue, which approximate their identity colours to fit within the Pantone system when required but are historically defined by many other traditions.

== Other uses and influence in Toronto culture ==
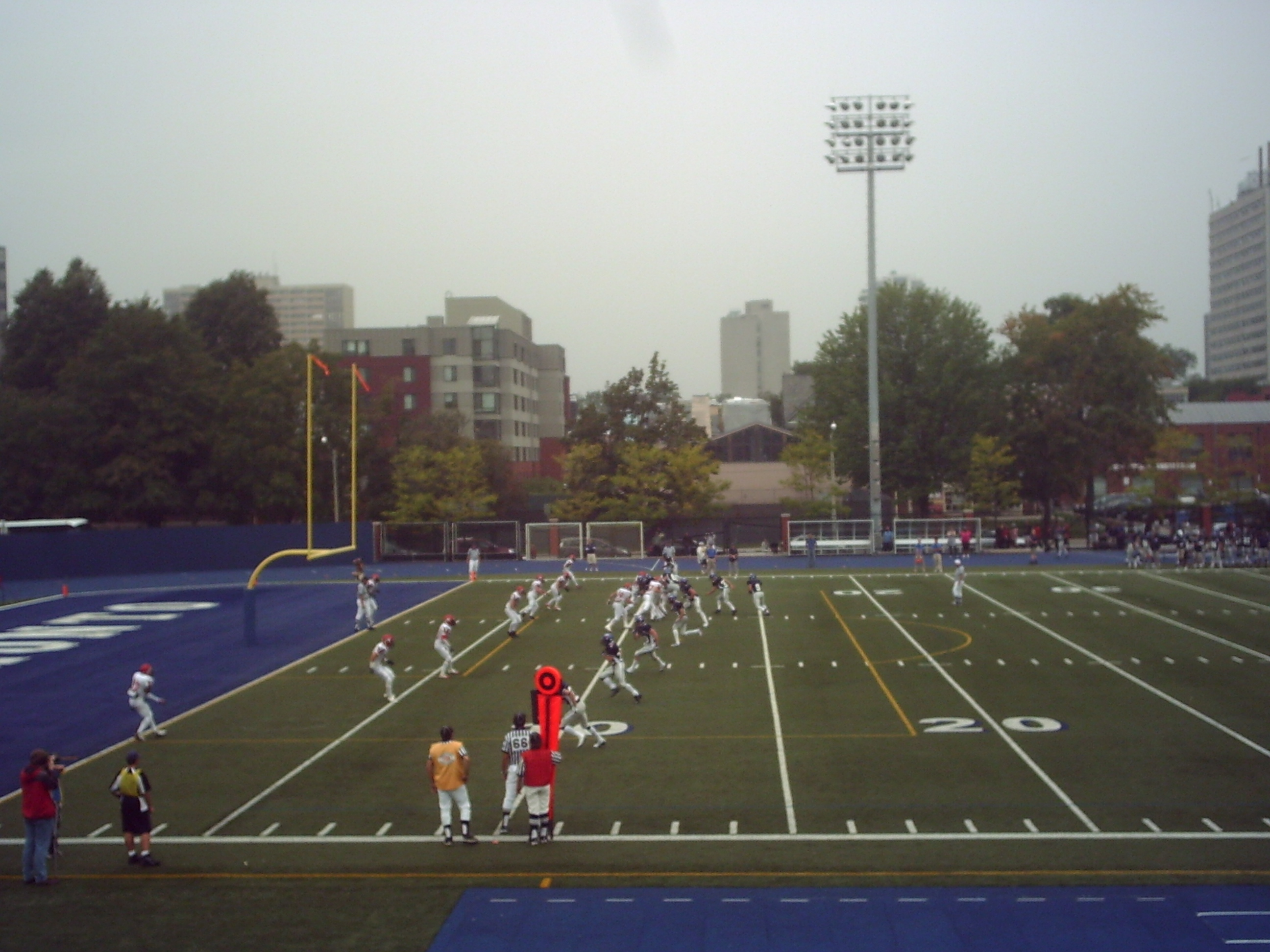
2008 view of Blues football players at Varsity Stadium, with U of T blue in use alongside the sports logo.

U of T Blue serves as the primary colour for the university's Varsity Blues sports teams, which shaped how the city of Toronto began branding itself using the colour blue. For example, most major sports teams representing Toronto adopt a similar shade of blue, including the Maple Leafs and Marlies (hockey), Blue Jays (baseball), and Argonauts (football), and the city of Toronto's logo, flag, and coat of arms do the same. Newspapers that are centred around the city, such as the Toronto Star and NOW. Toronto (updated website), adopt other variants of blue. While other teams and agencies adopt the colour red (e.g. the Raptors and Reds), the colour blue collects Toronto's identity as distinct from the usage of red throughout Canada as a national colour, adopted from the country's English roots, similar to how the university adopted its colour from Oxford.

While the university's official sports teams are nicknamed the Varsity Blues, its mascot, "True Blue," is a reference to the blue colour identity of the university. Although the university prioritises the "blue" nickname in its identity, its mascot is a beaver, similar to the Crimson nickname of Harvard University, with the beaver uniquely connecting to its status as one of Canada's national symbols and its feature on the university coat of arms.

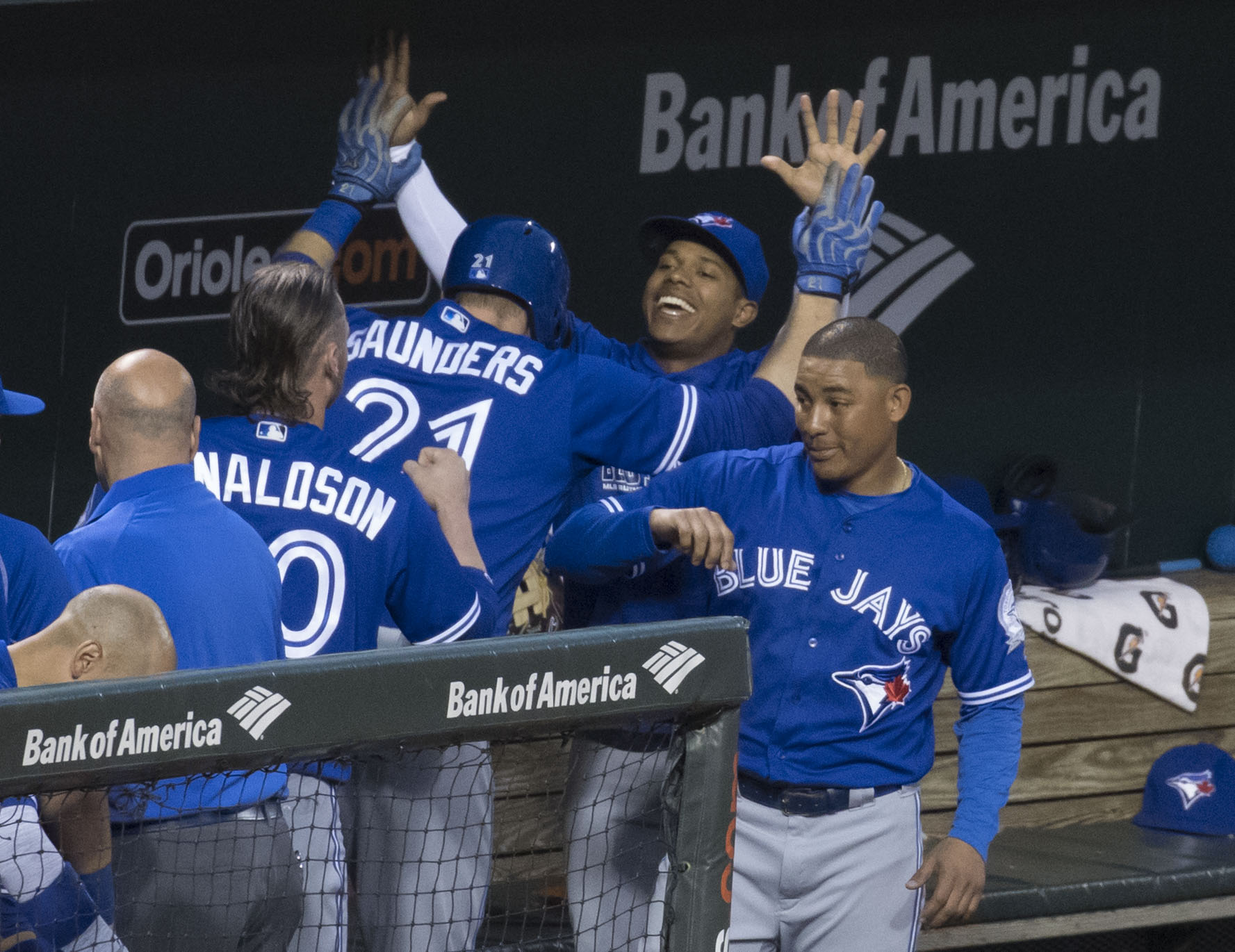
Members of the Toronto Blue Jays baseball team celebrate while wearing their dark blue team colours.

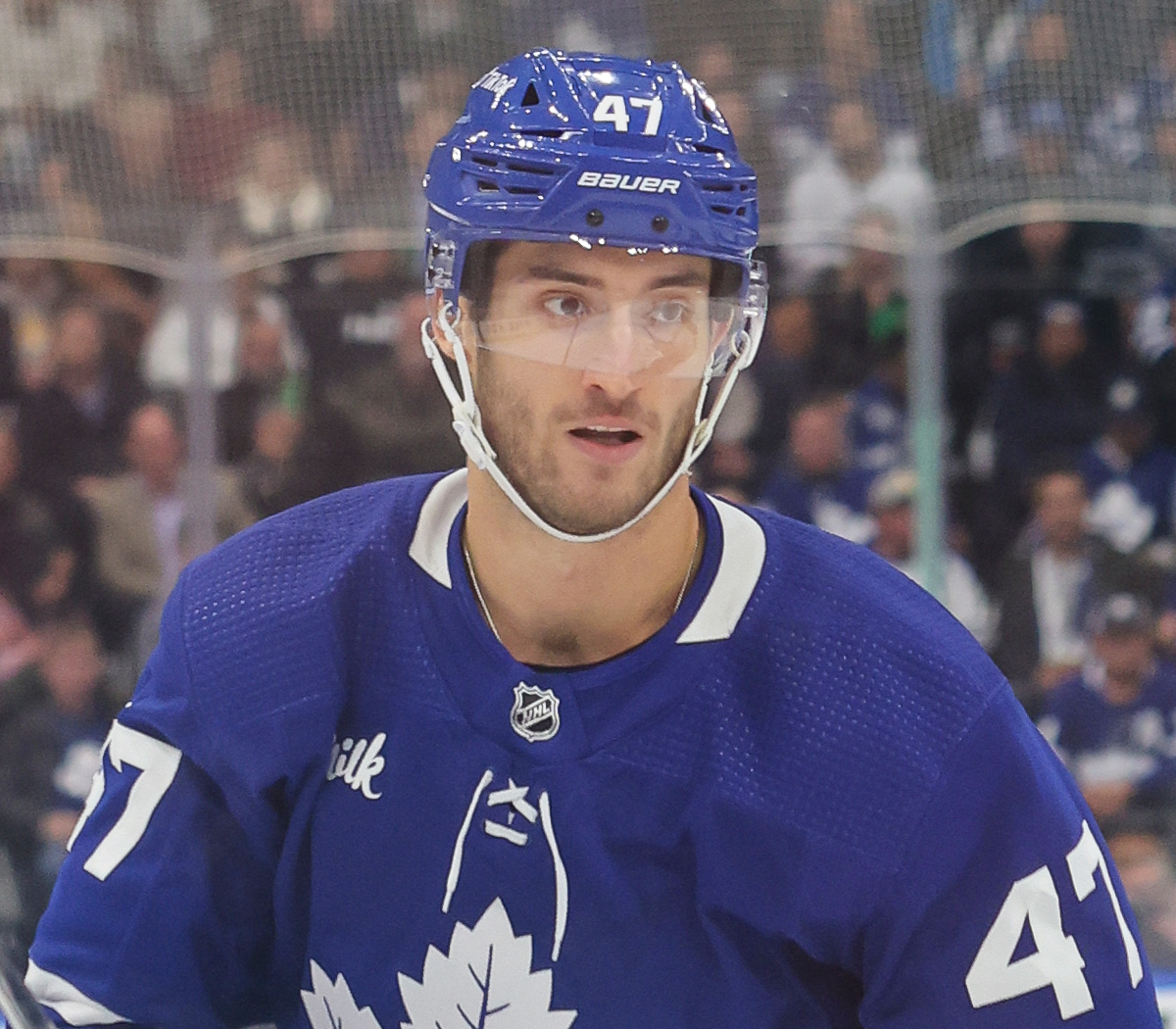
Professional ice hockey player Pierre Engvall wearing the Toronto Maple Leafs home colour uniform (dark blue).

== See also ==
- Academic dress of the University of Toronto
- "The Blue and White" (song)
- Coat of arms of the University of Toronto
- Red and Blue Bowl
- School colors
- Shades of blue
