= True Blue (mascot) =

Mascot of the Toronto Varsity Blues

- Team: Toronto Varsity Blues
- University: University of Toronto
- Conference: OUA
- Description: Blue anthropomorphic beaver
- First seen: Early 1980s

True Blue (sometimes called Trevor True Blue) is the official mascot for the Toronto Varsity Blues of the University of Toronto. He is a blue anthropomorphic beaver.

True Blue appears at all Varsity Blues home football games and some basketball, volleyball and hockey home games and campus events, notably orientation week on the St. George campus. He also makes regular appearances at CIBC Run for the Cure, Pride Toronto, and during halftime at Toronto Maple Leafs and Toronto Marlies hockey games. He represents the university and specifically its athletics department, which oversees varsity sports.

Every year, usually two or three students from any of the University of Toronto's three campuses wear the costume as part of a work-study program.

== History ==
There have been various iterations of True Blue dating back several decades, although he has always been a beaver. He was introduced by the University of Toronto Athletics department in the early 1980s. The current suit, which was created to have a slimmer and more modern design debuted at a football home opener on August 30, 2015.

There has been debate over whether True Blue is a beaver or squirrel, however he is officially a beaver.

In 2018, True Blue was the winner of CBC's Canadian mascot contest, where fans voted on a bracket of 16 university mascots from across the country.

== See also ==
- Coat of arms of the University of Toronto, which features a beaver
- U of T Blue
- "The Blue and White" (song)
