= The Blue and White (song) =

University of Toronto fight song

"The Blue and White" is the anthem and fight song of the University of Toronto and its athletics teams, the Toronto Varsity Blues. It was written in 1908 by Claris Edwin Silcox (class of 1908), editor of The Varsity and Torontonensis, with music composed by Clayton E. Bush (class of 1907) and arranged by J.D.A. Tripp. The song references the Varsity Blues team colours in its title and lyrics.

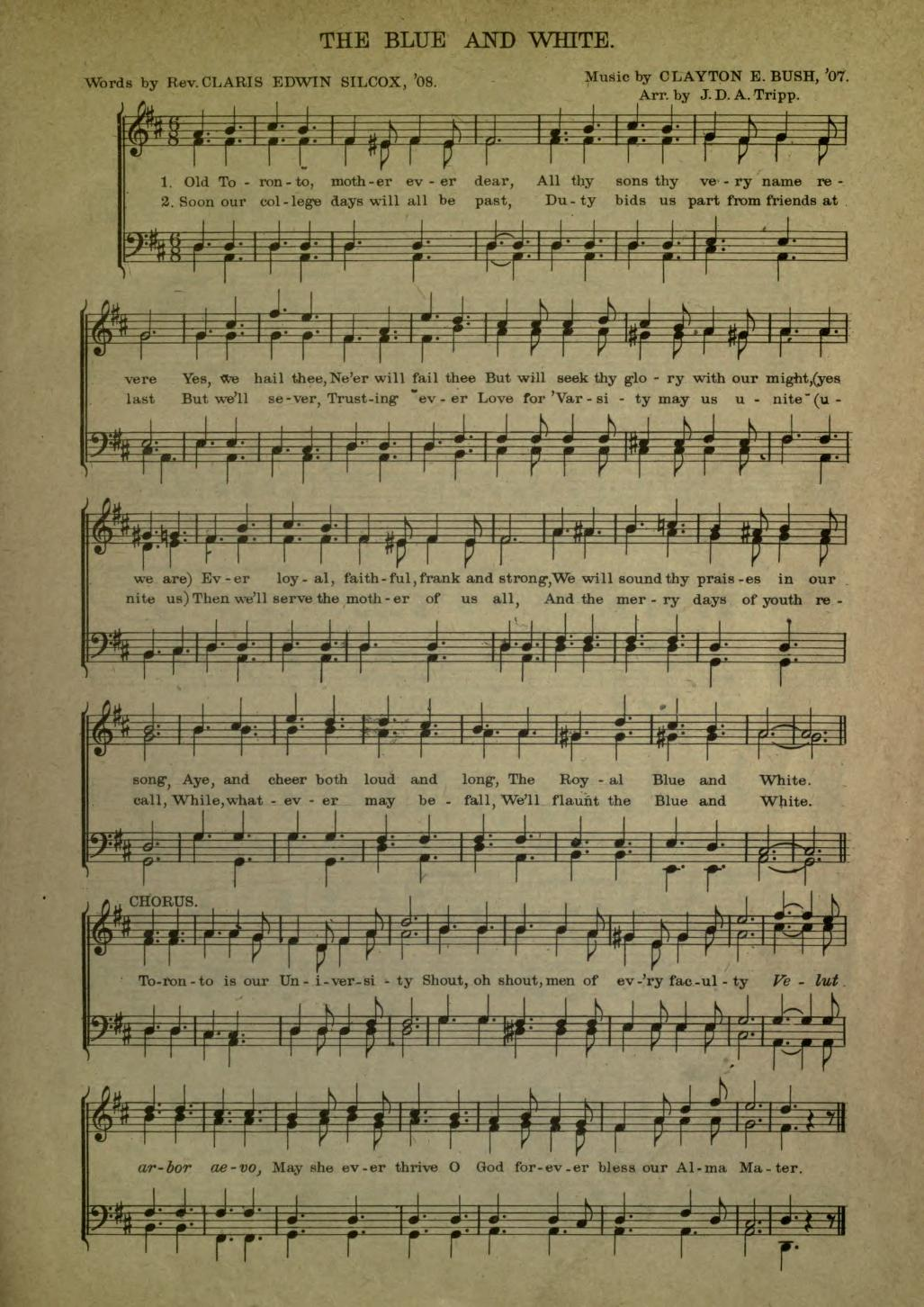
Sheet music for "The Blue and White" by Clayton E. Bush, Claris Edwin Silcox and J.D.A. Tripp from 1918

== Lyrics ==
Old Toronto, mother ever dear
All thy sons thy very name revere
Yes, we'll hail thee,
Ne'er will fail thee
But will seek thy glory with our might,
(Yes we are)
Ever loyal, faithful, frank and strong,
We will sound thy praises in our song,
Aye, and cheer both loud and long,
The Royal Blue and White

Toronto is our University
Shout, oh shout, men of ev'ry faculty
Velut arbor ævo,
May she ever thrive
O God forever bless our alma mater

Soon our college days will all be past,
Duty bids us part from friends at last
But we'll sever,
Trusting ever
Love for Varsity may us unite – (unite us)
Then we'll serve the mother of us all,
And the merry days of youth recall,
While whatever may befall,
We'll flaunt the Blue and White

== See also ==
- U of T Blue
- True Blue (mascot)
- "Oil Thigh", the fight song of Queen's University
