= Academic dress of the University of Toronto =

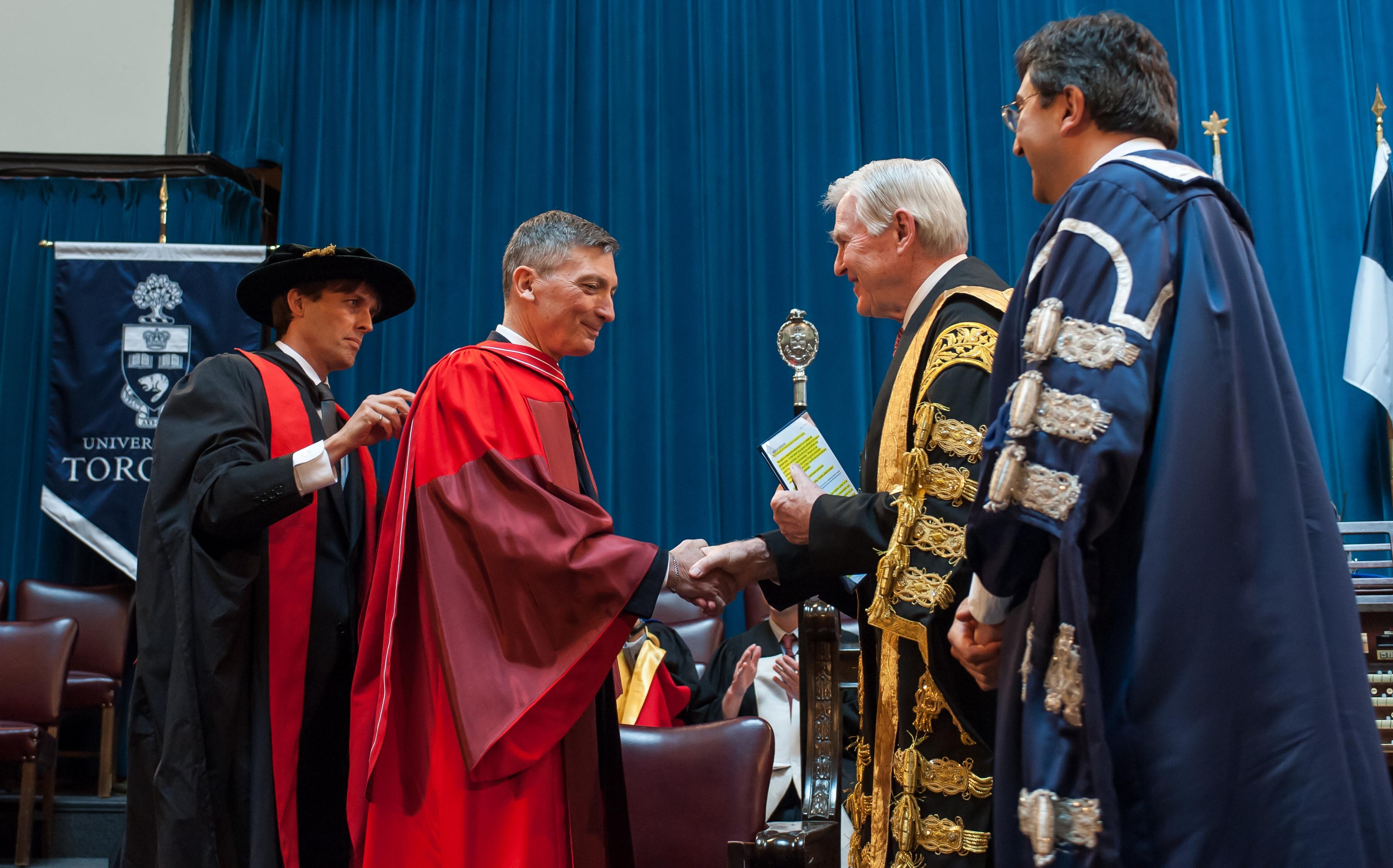
Chancellor Michael Wilson (second on the right) conferring an honorary degree during a 2013 convocation

Founded in 1827, the University of Toronto has a long history of academic dress as one of the oldest universities in Canada.

Apart from convocation ceremonies, some students and faculty have historically worn gowns during classes and university events. Use of gowns outside of convocation is mainly tied to the history of individual colleges, most notably Trinity College, one of the oldest federated colleges within the University of Toronto, which has had the longest tradition of wearing such gowns and the only one that enforces the practice to this day.

== Traditions ==
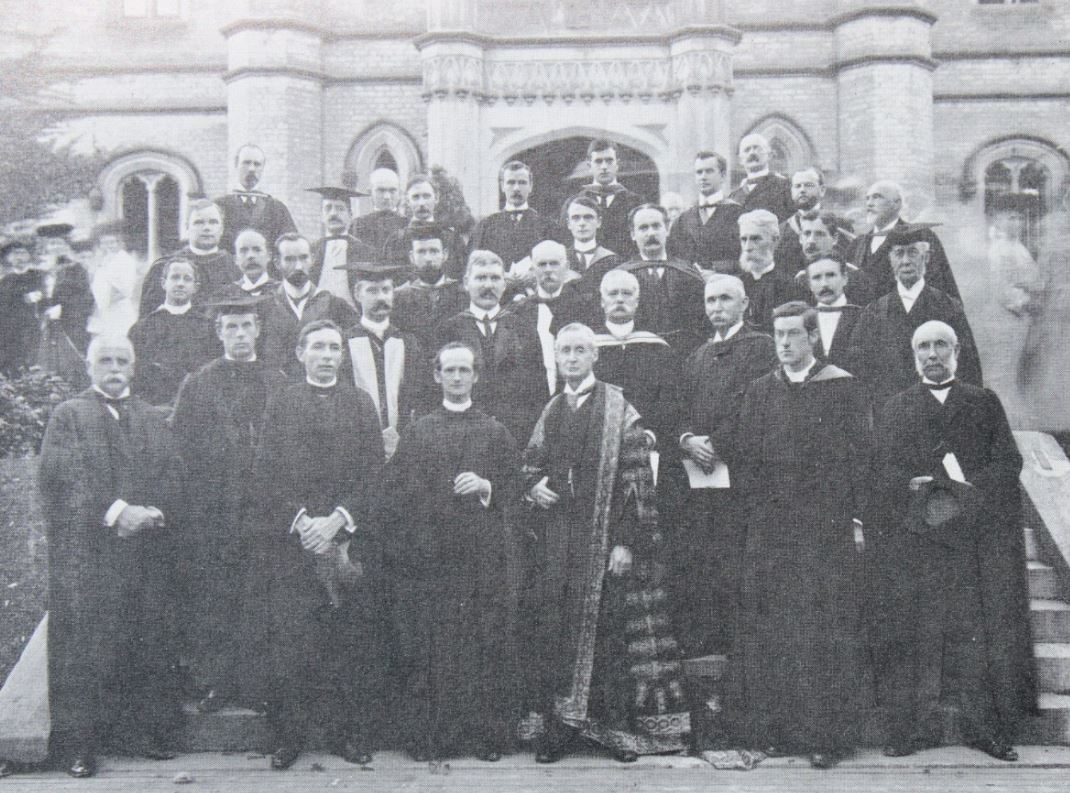
Graduates of Trinity College in 1904

Trinity College, founded in 1851, has a long-standing tradition associated with gowns. Since 1904 when it became a federated college in the University of Toronto, students would wear gowns to classes and university events as a symbol of their membership in Trinity, one of the more insular colleges at the university. Trinity College previously enforced a rule that if a student wished to leave college grounds, they were required to wear a cap and gown. This rule was later dropped.

Over time, the garments fell out of regular use, but remained for Trinity events such as academic and High Table dinners. Their use was unofficially retired briefly during the COVID-19 pandemic, with students advocating for their return beginning in 2023 citing their role as a distinctive symbol of the college and in its sense of community. They were unceremoniously reinstated in April 2025 at the first gowned college event since the pandemic. Their return sparked some discourse from the wider university community and criticism in regards to elitism.

Other St. George colleges, such as Victoria College, maintain the use of gowns only during certain formal events.

== Graduate dress ==
The University of Toronto's full hood design [f15] as identified by the Groves classification system (left: rear view, right: flat view)

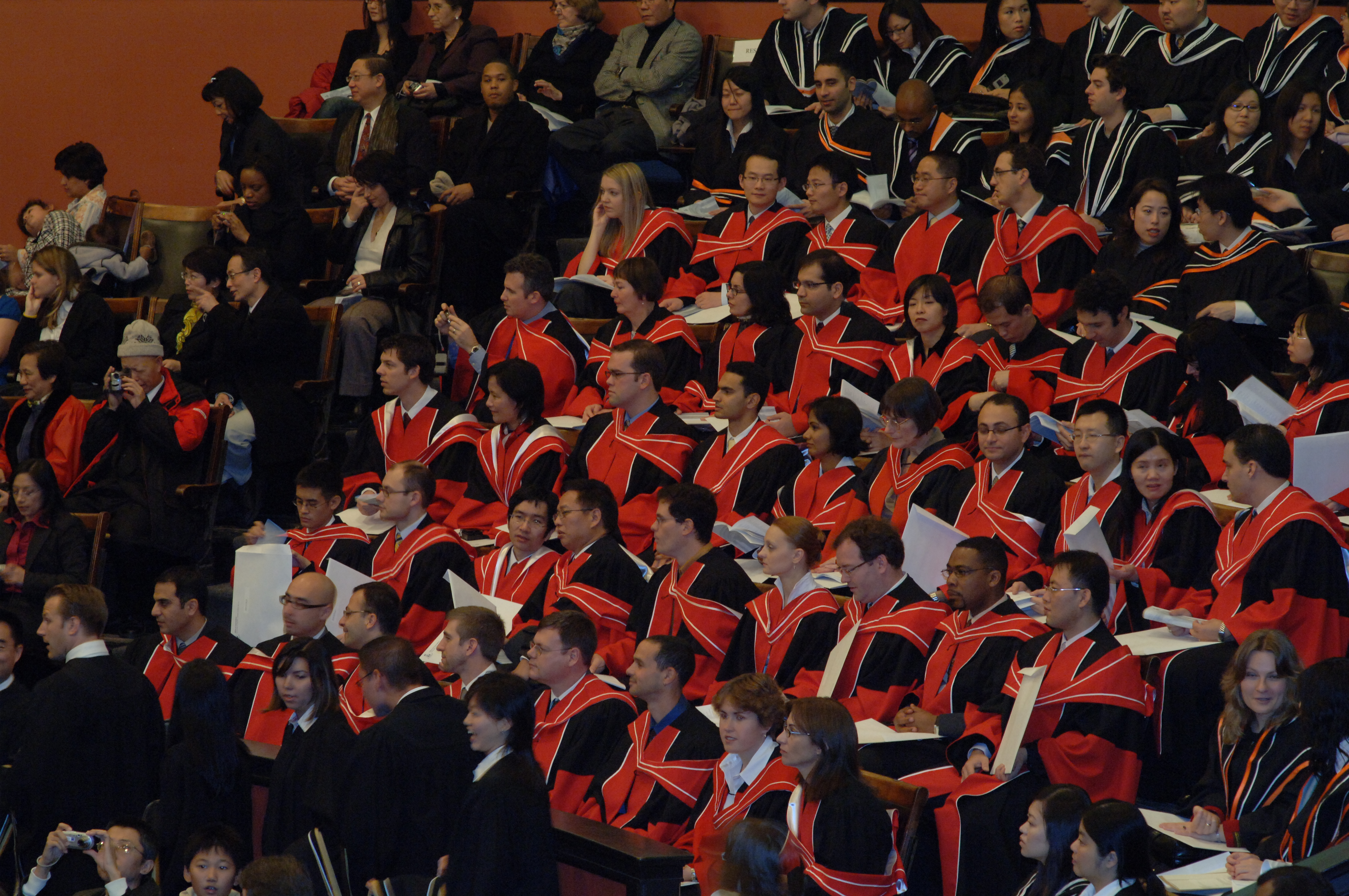
Graduating students wearing scarlet and white doctoral regalia (foreground) in Convocation Hall

Academic regalia is worn by every graduate during University of Toronto convocation with a black gown as its base. Each graduate wears a hood draped over their shoulders with colours corresponding to their academic degree and field of study. There are at least 91 hoods in use indicating different degrees. Unlike most universities, graduate caps are not worn by graduating students.

Original dress was inspired by the universities of Oxford and Cambridge in England. The University of Toronto's traditions have since evolved to represent its place in Canada and greater recognition towards the traditional regalia of Indigenous peoples.

=== Bachelor's and master's ===
Both bachelor's and master's degree graduates wear academic gowns that are worn zipped and closed in the front like a coat.

Black and white hoods are worn by graduates of a Bachelor of Arts (B.A./H.B.A.) and Bachelor of Science (B.Sc./H.B.Sc.) from the Faculty of Arts and Science, University of Toronto Mississauga, or University of Toronto Scarborough. Graduates in the same academic divisions graduating with a Bachelor of Business Administration (B.B.A.) wear orange and white hoods. Those graduating with a Bachelor of Commerce (B.Com.) degree wear hoods coloured black, orange and white.

Graduates of a Master of Arts (M.A.) wear black and cerise hoods. Those graduating with a Master of Science (M.Sc.) wear black, grey and cerise, and Master of Applied Science (M.A.Sc.) graduates wear black and maroon.

Those graduating with a Doctor of Medicine (M.D.) wear dark blue and scarlet hoods.

=== Doctoral ===
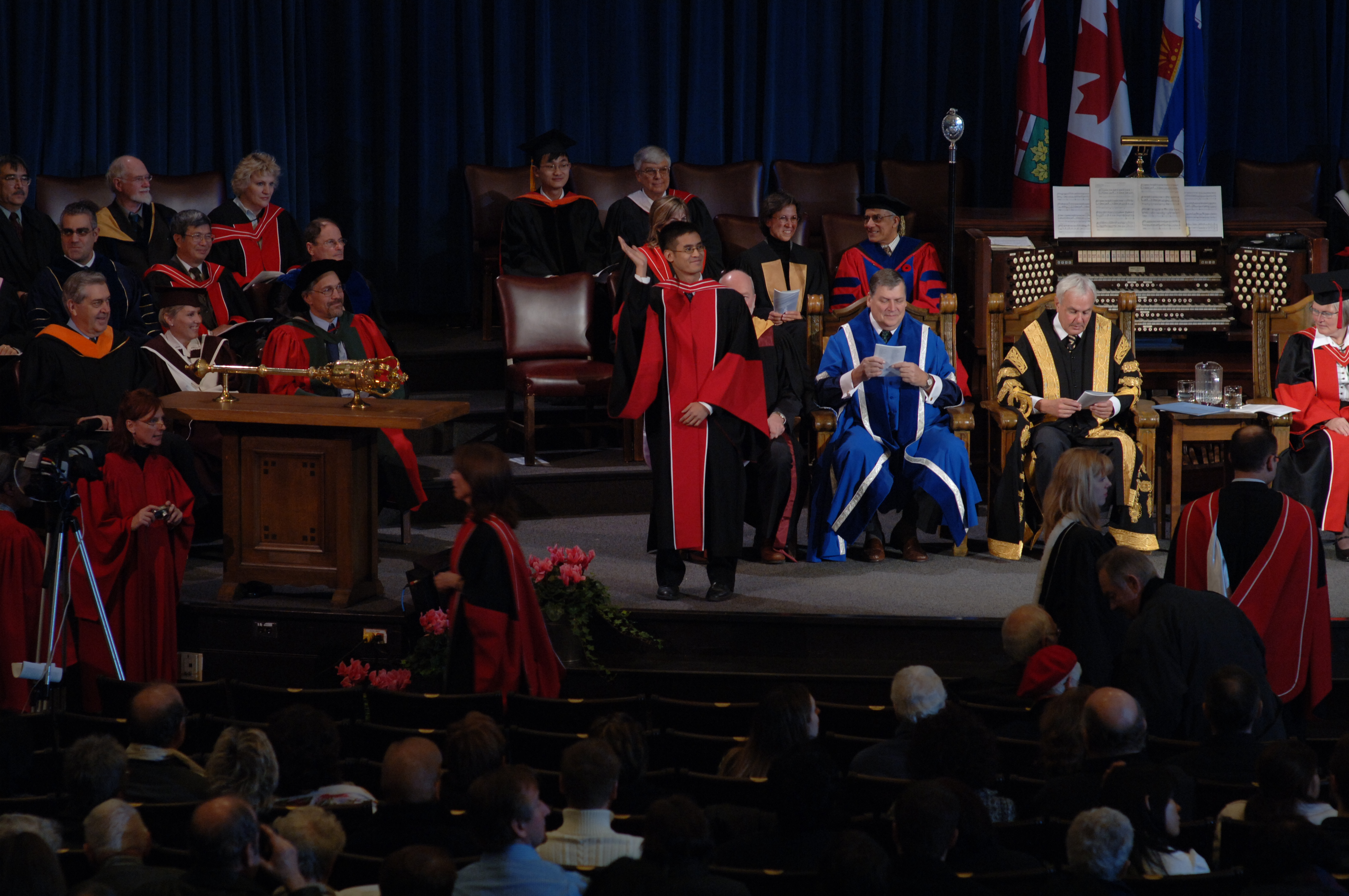
A doctoral graduate wearing scarlet and white regalia

Doctoral gowns are worn open in the front, unlike bachelor's and master's gowns. The colours of Doctor of Philosophy (Ph.D.) hoods at the University of Toronto are scarlet and white.

=== Indigenous graduates ===
Indigenous students are permitted to wear their traditional Indigenous regalia in place of the academic gown, so long as they wear the hood corresponding to their academic degree.

== Hood colours ==
| Degree | Colour names | Colours |
|---|---|---|
| Bachelor of Arts (BA) / Bachelor of Science (BSc) | Black/White | |
| Bachelor of Business Administration (BBA) | Orange/White | |
| Bachelor of Commerce (BCom) | Black/Orange/White | |
| Doctor of Medicine (MD) | Dark Blue/Scarlet | |
| Doctor of Philosophy (PhD) | Scarlet/White | |
| Master of Arts (MA) | Black/Cerise | |
| Master of Applied Science (MASc) | Black/Maroon | |
| Master of Biotechnology (MBiotech) | Black/Orange/Grey | |
| Master of Forensic Accounting (MFAcc) | Black/White/Orange | |
| Master of Management and Professional Accounting (MMPA) | Black/Orange/White | |
| Master of Management of Innovation (MMI) | Black/White/Royal Blue/Orange | |
| Master of Science (MSc) | Black/Grey/Cerise | |
| Master of Science in Biomedical Communications (MScBMC) | Black/Dark Blue/Grey | |
| Master of Science in Sustainability Management (MScSM) | Black/Grey/Orange/Biosphere Blue | |
| Master of Urban Innovation (MUI) | Black/Dark Brown/Ivory | |
| Master of Science in Occupational Therapy (MScOT) | Black/Blue/Kelly-Green/Grey | |
| Master of Science in Planning (MScPl) | Black/Slate Grey/Corn Yellow | |

== See also ==
- Coat of arms of the University of Toronto
- U of T Blue
- Academic dress of McGill University
