= Armorial of Canadian universities =

The armorial of Canadian universities is the collection of coats of arms of universities in Canada. Approximately 60 Canadian universities have their own coats of arms. Coats of arms are designed to represent the history and values of the institutions they represent and are used as a brand image for the university. Canadian coats of arms often incorporate First Nations symbolism.

Coats of arms include a number of elements or parts (e.g., Escutcheon, Crest, Supporters, Badge). Some also include a motto, although this may be used separately from the coat of arms. Detailed information about the coats of arms of Canadian universities is listed on the Public Register of Arms, Flags and Badges.

The Association of Universities & Colleges of Canada - Arms: Argent four pairs of maple seeds in saltire Vert; Crest: On two closed books Vert an open book Proper bound and charged on the dexter page with a maple leaf Vert; Supporters: Two polar bears each holding a feather Argent penned Vert and resting a hind paw on an Ionic capital Argent all set on a quadrangle Vert; Motto: Vox Eruditionis.

== Alberta ==
Image	Blazon
	Alberta, matriculated 31 May 1994 Escutcheon: Vert a bar wavy between a base tapissé of ears of wheat and a chief dancetty Or the chief charged with an open book proper bound Vert edged Or. Crest: A Great Horned Owl (Bubo virginianus) Proper gorged with a collar per fess dancetty Or and Vert. Supporters: On a grassy mound growing thereon wild roses (Rosa acicularis) dexter a prong-horn antelope (Antilocapra americana) Proper sinister a bear (Ursus americanus) Or each gorged with a collar per fess dancetty Or and Vert. Motto: Quaecumque Vera (Whatsoever Things Are True)
	Alberta - St. Joseph's, matriculated 4 April 1989 Escutcheon: Per pale Or and Vert issuant from the base a Lily slipped and leaved per pale counterchanged from its opening over all enflamed Proper a bordure per pale to the dexter embattled Vert to the sinister rayonny Or. Crest: A horse passant Vert semé of mullets and crined and unguled Or supporting with the dexter fore leg a spray of Wild Rose (Rosa acicularis) flowered budded slipped and leaved all Proper. Motto: Quaecumque Vera Doce Me (Teach Me Whatsoever Things Are True)
	Athabasca, matriculated 15 August 2011 Escutcheon: Azure on a Canadian pale Argent a pile reversed throughout Vert. Crest: A demi-bear Azure holding the mace of Athabasca University Proper. Supporters: Two hawks Azure beaked and membered Argent standing on a grassy mount Vert set with poplar leaves Or. Motto: Learning For Life
	Calgary, matriculated 15 October 2006 Escutcheon: Or a bull’s head caboshed Sable accorné Gules between two flags Gules their staves Sable conjoined in base, on a chief enarched Gules a rose Argent barbed and seeded Vert between two open books Argent bound and edged Or. Motto: MO SHÙILE TOGAM SUAS
	Grant MacEwan, matriculated 20 May 2010 Escutcheon: Azure on a rose Argent a plate fimbriated Azure. Crest: A sparrow wings elevated and addorsed perched on a walking-staff fesswise Proper. Supporters: Two griffins per fess Azure and Argent beaked and membered Argent standing on a compartment of prairie grass set with wild roses Proper. Motto: Discendo Floremus; Badge: On a plate fimbriated Azure a griffin's head erased Azure.
	Lethbridge, matriculated 20 January 2012 Escutcheon: Azure a sun in splendour Or within an orle Argent. Crest: Issuant from a circlet of wild roses, a closed book proper lying flat bound Azure its spine to the dexter resting thereon an open book proper bound Azure its sinister page surmounted by an eagle’s feather Proper. Supporters: Dexter a pronghorn buck, sinister a mule deer doe, each holding a miner’s lamp and standing on a grassy base set with coulees, a rock and rough fescue Proper. Motto: Fiat Lux; Flag: Azure a sun in splendour Or.
	Mount Royal, matriculated 15 April 2011 Escutcheon: Argent three piles reversed throughout on a chief Azure a mace Or embellished Argent. Crest: A demi-bighorn sheep Or muzzled Argent accorné and unguled Azure its dexter hoof resting on a closed book Proper bound Azure charged with a dove descending Argent. Supporters: Two cougars Or each supporting on the shoulder a mace Azure embellished Argent and standing on a rocky mount Argent. Motto: Quam Bene Non Quantum; Flag: Azure a sun in splendour Or.
	St. Mary's, matriculated 15 November 2013 Escutcheon: Azure a cross Or between 1st and 4th four M majuscules in cross, those in pale Or those in fess Argent, and 2nd and 3rd an open book Argent bound Or. Crest: On a rocky mount an osprey wings displayed proper grasping in the dexter claw a scroll Or. Supporters: Dexter a bison Or accorné and unguled Azure sinister a white-tailed deer Or attired and unguled Azure queued Argent both standing on a mount of prairie grass set with wild roses and garden lilies Proper. Motto: In Lumine Tuo Videbimus Lumen; Badge: Four M majuscules in cross those in pale Or those in fess Azure.

== British Columbia ==
Image	Blazon
	British Columbia, matriculated 15 October 2015 Escutcheon: Argent three bars wavy Azure issuant from the base a demi-sun in splendour Proper on a chief Azure an open book Proper edged and buckled Or inscribed in letters Proper TUUM EST, meaning “It Is Yours”.
	British Columbia - Green, matriculated 15 January 1996 Escutcheon: Vert in base three bars wavy Or on a chief sapiné Or a roundel per pale embattled Argent and Vert between two open books Argent bound and clasped Vert. Crest: Issuant from a circlet of roses Or alternating with dogwood flowers Argent two demi cougars respectant Or grasping a staff Vert flying therefrom to the sinister a banner Azure charged with a representation of the globe videlicet a sphere with lines of latitude and longitude Or. Motto: Ideas And Friendship
	British Columbia - Peter A. Allard Law, matriculated 9 November 1992 Escutcheon: Purpure a griffin rampant holding with the dexter forepaw a sword and with the sinister forepaw scales of justice all Argent. Crest: An open book Proper bound Purpure displaying on the dexter page an escutcheon of the arms of the University of British Columbia. Motto: Fiat Justitia Ruat Coelum (Let Justice Be Done Though The Heavens Fall)
	British Columbia Institute of Technology, matriculated 29 February 1996 Escutcheon: Per pale embattled Azure and Argent on a chief Gules a cogwheel charged with an open compass between dexter a bezant and sinister a rod of Aesculapius all Or within a bordure per pale embattled Argent and Azure charged with four billets bretessed counterchanged. Crest: Issuant from a circlet of dogwood flowers Argent seeded Or leaved Vert an eagle Or head Argent beak Or issuant between its wings elevated and addorsed a torch Gules enflamed Or. Supporters: On a grassy mound Vert above barry wavy Argent and Azure on either side a cougar Azure armed and langued Gules winged Or. Motto: Quisque Dominus Summi; Flag: Per pale embattled Azure and Argent an escutcheon of the Arms. Badge: On a hurt between four dogwood flowers Argent seeded Or an eagle Or head Argent beak Or issuant between its wings elevated and addorsed a torch Gules enflamed Or.
	Capilano, matriculated 15 September 2010 Escutcheon: Argent a salmon hauriant contourné Azure embellished Argent in the Coast Salish style above a barrulet wavy Azure a chief indented of two Bleu Céleste. Crest: A stack of two books Argent bound Azure their spines to the dexter flanked by dogwood flowers and maple leaves Argent. Supporters: Two bears Azure winged Bleu Céleste, both standing on a rocky mount Proper. Motto: Through Learning To A Greater Good; Badge: A salmon hauriant contourné Azure embellished Argent in the Coast Salish style.
	Emily Carr, matriculated 15 August 2008 Escutcheon: Azure six piles reversed throughout Argent three in bend meeting in point three in bend sinister meeting in point all counterchanged. Crest: Issuant from flames a Coast Salish spindle whorl charged with a raven all Argent embellished Azure. Supporters: Two crows Azure standing on a rock Argent above barry wavy Argent and Azure. Motto: Eye Mind And Hand; Badge: A Javanese monkey sejant affronty Azure holding a billet Argent.
	Kwantlen, matriculated 4 May 1999 Escutcheon: Azure an escutcheon Argent featuring the spirit of Kwantlen emblem comprising a wolf a salmon and a river Azure as styled by Brandon Gabriel between in chief dexter a lion sinister a tiger respectant rampant and in base dexter a jaguar and sinister a Chinese dragon rampant respectant all Or in centre chief an open book Argent bound and charged with a billet in fess bretessed Or. Crest: A coronet the upper rim set with four salmon respectant two and two Argent. Supporters: On a grassy mound Vert set with Douglas fir cones Or rising above barry wavy Azure and Argent dexter a doe Or unguled Azure queued of a fish tail Argent fins Or gorged with a wreath Argent and Azure pendant therefrom a pommeis charged with an open book Argent bound Or sinister an eagle Or head Argent armed and beaked Azure gorged with a like wreath pendant therefrom a pommeis charged with a billet in fess bretessed Or. Motto: Through Tireless Effort Knowledge And Understanding; Badge: The spirit of Kwantlen emblem as described in the Arms.
	Malaspina, matriculated 20 May 1995 Escutcheon: Or over three barrulets wavy Azure in base a representation of a Spanish corbeta tempore 1790 Azure sails Argent edged Gules on a chief dancetty Azure four open books Argent bound Or. Crest: Issuant from a Salish canoe Gules a demi-sun in splendour Or. Supporters: On a grassy mount set with fir trees Vert in front of mountains proper crested Argent all rising above barry wavy Argent and Azure two eagles Or heads Argent wings elevated and addorsed Azure. Motto: Discoveries In Education; Flag: Azure between four open books in pale Argent bound Or a Canadian pale Or bearing in chief a Salish canoe Gules issuant therefrom a demi-sun in splendour Or fimbriated Gules and in base a representation of a Spanish corbeta as in the Arms. Badge: A sun in splendour Or charged with a representation of a Spanish corbeta as in the Arms.
	Northern British Columbia, matriculated 21 March 1994 Escutcheon: Vert a coniferous tree eradicated Or on a chief also Or an open book proper bound Sable between two ravens respectant also Sable. Crest: Rising from a circlet of maple leaves snowflakes and dogwood flowers set alternately all Argent a wave Azure leaping therefrom a salmon as styled by Ron Sebastian. Supporters: Upon a compartment rising above barry wavy Argent and Azure charged with a killer whale as styled by Ron Sebastian per pale dexter a forest Vert beneath mountain peaks Argent sinister a field of ears of grain Or embellished Vert dexter a female kermodei bear (Ursus americanus kermodei) Or chested Argent gorged with a collar of conifer branches Vert fructed Or sinister a woodland caribou buck (Rangifer tarandus caribou) Or gorged with a like collar. Motto: EN CHA HUNÁ (Respecting All Forms Of Life); Flag: A banner of the Arms the three sides of the fly bordered Vert and Or. Badge: A sun in splendour Argent charged with a stellar jay (Cyanocitta stelleri) wings displayed Azure.
	Royal Roads, matriculated 24 March 1998 Escutcheon: Azure a demi sun in splendour Argent issuant from an embattled wall Azure masoned Argent thereon a book expanded also Argent edged Gules. Crest: Rising out of a mural crown Azure masoned Argent three maple leaves conjoined on one stem Gules. Supporters: Upon a grassy mound rising above barry wavy Argent and Azure dexter a cougar Argent armed and langued Gules holding in the interior paw a representation of the Royal Crown proper and sinister a Chinese dragon Argent armed and langued Gules holding in the interior talons an anchor Or. Motto: HUĆIST TŦE S,HELI ŁTE (Living Our Learning)
	Simon Fraser, matriculated 20 April 2007 Escutcheon: Quarterly, first and fourth Azure three fraises Argent, second and third Argent three antique crowns Gules, all within a bordure quarterly Argent and Gules, on a chief Gules an open book proper bound and edged Or between two cross crosslets fitché Or. Motto: NOUS SOMMES PRÊTS
	Thompson Rivers, matriculated 1 April 2005 Escutcheon: Azure a sun in splendour encircled by an annulus wavy Argent. Crest: A demi bear Azure winged Argent issuant from a coronet set with fish embowed respectant Argent. Supporters: Two horses Argent each gorged with a wreath of sage Proper pendent therefrom a hurt charged with an open book Argent standing on a mound of earth set with mountains and sage bushes Proper. Motto: T7ETSXEMÍNTE RE STSELXMÉM; Badge: A sun in splendour Argent charged with a bear’s head Azure.
	Vancouver Island, matriculated 15 August 2018 Escutcheon: Or a Spanish corvette circa 1790 Azure sails Argent edged Gules on a base of three barrulets wavy, on a chief dancetty Azure four open books Argent bound Or. Crest: A demi-sun in splendour Or issuant from a Salish canoe Gules. Supporters: Two eagles Or heads Argent wings elevated and addorsed Azure standing on a grassy mount set with fir trees Vert in front of mountains proper all issuant from barry wavy Argent and Azure. Motto: Discoveries In Education; Flag: Azure on a Canadian pale in chief a demi-sun in splendour Or fimbriated and issuant from a Salish canoe Gules and in base a Spanish corvette as in the Arms all between four open books Argent bound Or. Badge: A sun in splendour Or charged with a Spanish corvette as in the Arms.
	Victoria, matriculated 3 April 2001 Escutcheon: Azure an open book proper edged bound and clasped Or on a chief Argent three martlets Gules. Crest: A dexter cubit arm proper in the hand a torch erect Or enflamed proper irradiated Or and ensigned with a scroll Argent thereon the Hebrew words Azure meaning "Let there be light". Supporters: Two eagles Or heads Argent wings elevated and addorsed Azure standing on a grassy mount set with fir trees Vert in front of mountains proper all issuant from barry wavy Argent and Azure. Motto: Multitudo Sapientium Sanitas Orbis

== Manitoba ==
Image	Blazon
	Manitoba, matriculated 15 October 1992 Escutcheon: Quarterly first the shield of arms of the Province of Manitoba its cross of St. George charged at the honour point with a closed crown ensigned with a cross Or second Gules a sprig of three maple leaves and in chief two fleurs-de-lys all Or third Gules a representation of St. John proper habited and nimbed Or sejant on a rock proper writing with a quill Argent in an open book leathered proper edged Or to his sinister an eagle wings displayed also Or perched on the rock fourth a grapevine slipped and leaved Or fructed Purpure and over the quarterings a cross Or charged at the centre with an open book leathered proper edged Or.
	Manitoba - Medicine, matriculated 15 August 2008 Escutcheon: Vert a torch Or enflamed Proper entwined of a serpent Or, on a chief Argent a cross Gules surmounted of an open book Argent bound and edged Sable. Crest: A bison courant on a grassy mount Proper. Motto: Fiat Lux (Let There Be Light)
	Manitoba - St. John's, matriculated 15 October 2006 Escutcheon: Sable on a fess wavy Argent between in chief two beavers couchant and in base an eagle displayed affronty Or two barrulets wavy Gules all within a bordure Or. Crest: In front of an eagle rising Or the figure of St. John the Evangelist Proper habited Argent cloaked Vert holding in the dexter hand a quill pen Argent and in the sinister hand an open book proper edged Or bound Gules inscribed NISI DOMINUS meaning “Except the Lord”, in letters Sable. Motto: In Lumine Tuo Videbimus Lumen (In Thy Light We Shall See Light)

== New Brunswick ==
Image	Blazon
	Crandall, matriculated 15 September 2010 Escutcheon: Azure a Latin cross throughout Or issuant from a base barry wavy Argent and Azure, between first an open book second rays in bend sinister third a torch enflamed and fourth a dove descending Argent. Crest: An apple tree Or fructed Vert. Supporters: Two horses saddled and bridled Proper standing on a grassy mount Vert set with wild roses Proper above barry wavy Argent and Azure. Motto: CHRISTUS PRÆEMINEN
	Moncton, matriculated 20 September 1999 Escutcheon: Azure above three annulets interlaced in fess Argent enclosing in centre a fleur-de-lys a mullet in chief and on a chief Or an open book Proper bound Gules between two Latin crosses Sable. Crest: An apple tree Or fructed Vert. Supporters: Issuing from three fleurs-de-lis in fess Azure a demi-lion Argent armed langued and crowned with an antique crown Or holding in the dexter paw a parchment scroll Argent bound Azure. Motto: Surge Illuminare (Arise And Be Enlightened)
	Mount Allison, matriculated 15 November 2007 Escutcheon: Murrey three open books proper edged and clasped Or the first inscribed LITTERAE the second RELIGIO and the third SCIENTIA in letters Sable all within a bordure Or. Crest: Issuant from a circlet of maple leaves Or a dexter cubit arm Proper holding a torch Murrey enflamed Proper. Supporters: Issuing from three fleurs-de-lis in fess Azure a demi-lion Argent armed langued and crowned with an antique crown Or holding in the dexter paw a parchment scroll Argent bound Azure. Motto: Litterae Religio Scientia (Letters Religion Knowledge)
	New Brunswick, matriculated 15 November 2007 Escutcheon: Per chevron Gules and Or in chief two beavers sejeant respectant Or holding between them an open book Proper bound and edged Or inscribed in letters Sable SAPERE AUDE and in base a lymphad oars in action pennons flying Sable. Motto: Sapere Aude (Dare To Know)
	St Thomas, matriculated 17 February 1997 Escutcheon: Party per chevron Vert and Or in chief a lymphad under sail oars in action between two suns in their splendour and in base a Latin cross bottony all counterchanged. Crest: The demi-figure of St. Michael the Archangel proper habited in a robe Argent corded Or nimbed of the same holding in the dexter hand a sword proper hilted and pommelled Or and bearing in the sinister hand a target leathered and studded Proper. Motto: Doce Bonitatem Scientiam Et Disciplinam

== Newfoundland and Labrador ==
Image	Blazon
	Memorial, matriculated 10 September 1992 Escutcheon: Gules a Cross Moline Or between two bars gemel wavy Argent in chief three closed books bound of the last edged and clasped of the second. Motto: Provehito In Altum (Reach For The Heights)

== Nova Scotia ==
Image	Blazon
	Acadia, matriculated 15 August 2006 Escutcheon: Per pale Azure and Argent two Nova Scotia woodsman’s axes in saltire between in chief and in base a cushion charged with a wolf’s head and in the flanks an open book all counterchanged. Motto: In Pulvere Vinces (In Dust You Will Win); Badge: A Nova Scotia woodsman’s axe hafted Gules the blade Proper.
	Cape Breton, matriculated 27 May 1995 Escutcheon: Argent upon two barrulets wavy Azure in base a representation of a Cape Breton sloop Or masted Sable sails Argent edged Azure in chief two keys in saltire wards upward and inward Vert surmounted by an open book Proper inscribed in letters Sable dexter UC and sinister CB bound and clasped Vert all within two boughs of spruce Vert overlapping in saltire below the book and surmounted by a maple leaf Gules. Crest: Rising from a wreath of mayflowers Proper a Canterbury cap Gules. Motto: THEID DÌCHIOLL AIR THOISEACH
	King's, matriculated 15 August 2007 Escutcheon: Argent on a saltire Azure between four islands thereon an oak tree Proper fructed Or a crozier and a key in saltire Or on a chief Gules an ancient crown Or and a paschal lamb Proper. Motto: Deo Legi Regi Gregi (For God Law King And People)
	St Anne, matriculated 10 July 1997 Escutcheon: Per pale Azure and Gules on a pile reversed flory Argent a beaver sejant erect Proper between in dexter chief a Star of Acadie irradiated Or and in sinister chief an ermine spot also Or. Crest: Issuing from a circlet of alternating maple leaves Gules and mayflowers proper a stork proper wings elevated its dexter foot on a closed book Azure edged Argent clasped Or. Motto: Fidelitas

== Ontario ==
Image	Blazon
	Carleton, matriculated 5 November 1992 Escutcheon: Sable a maple leaf Gules irradiated and charged with an open book Argent. Crest: A phoenix Gules quilled and beaked Or issuing from flames Proper. Supporters: On a grassy mount on either side a raven Sable beaked and membered Or armed Gules. Motto: Ours The Task Eternal; Flag: Bleu-Celeste a maple leaf Gules irradiated and charged with an open book Argent. Badge: On a sun in splendour Argent a maple leaf Gules charged with an open book Proper bound Or edged Bleu-Celeste.
	Laurentian, matriculated 26 March 2010 Escutcheon: Azure on a chevron Argent between in chief two open books Proper edged bound and clasped Or and in base a sun in splendour Or three cross-crosslets fitchy Sable. Crest: A white pine tree Azure set on a rocky mount Or. Supporters: Two eagles in Anishinaabe style Argent embellished Azure and Sable. Motto: Emitte Lucem Et Veritatem; Flag: A banner of the Arms adextré Or an eagle in Anishinaabe style contourné Argent embellished Azure and Sable. Badge: On a hurt a white pine tree Argent set on a mount Or.
	McMaster, matriculated 15 October 2006 Escutcheon: Argent an eagle displayed Gules beaked membered and charged on the breast with a Latin cross flory Or on a chief Azure an open book Proper bound Gules clasped Or between two maple leaves Or. Crest: On a mount Vert before an oak tree a stag courant Proper. Motto: ΤΑ ΠΑΝΤΑ ΕΝ ΧΡΙΣΩΙ ΣΥΝΕΣΤΗΚΕΝ (In Christ All Things Consist)
	Nipissing, matriculated 18 April 1994 Escutcheon: Azure on a fess wavy Argent between in chief a sun in splendour Or and in base an owl Argent a bar wavy Azure. Motto: Integritas (Integrity)
	Ontario Tech, matriculated 15 July 2009 Escutcheon: Argent an open book Proper bound Azure on a chief indented Azure a canoe inverted Argent. Crest: A falcon guardant wings addorsed and inverted Azure holding in its dexter claw a thunderbolt Argent. Supporters: Two thoroughbred horses Azure crined and unguled Argent standing on a grassy mount set with trillium flowers Proper. Motto: Cogitando Et Agendo Ducemus (By Thinking And Doing We Shall Lead)
	Ottawa, matriculated 5 June 1990 Escutcheon: Gules semé of escutcheons Argent on a fess also Argent two open books Proper edged Or bound Gules the dexter displaying a rose the sinister a fleur-de-lys Gules. Crest: A circlet of trillium flowers Proper alternating with fleurs-de-lys Azure a classical temple front of six columns Proper the pediment bearing an antique lamp enflamed Or. Supporters: Two horses Argent crined and hoofed Or gorged with a collar wavy Azure the whole set upon a grassy mound Vert charged with a maple leaf Or between a bend reversed and a bend both wavy Argent each charged with a like bendlet Azure. Motto: Deus Scientiarum Dominus Est (God Is The Master Of The Sciences)
	Redeemer, matriculated 15 September 2005 Escutcheon: Gules an open book Proper edged bound and clasped Or the pages inscribed with the Greek letters alpha and omega Gules on a chief Or a cross crosslet Gules between two trillium flowers Argent barbed and seeded Proper. Crest: A paschal lamb Proper between two palm branches Vert. Motto: Agnus Dei Omnium Rex (Lamb Of God King Of All); Badge: A paschal lamb proper encircled by two palm branches Vert joined in base by four trillium flowers Argent barbed and seeded Proper.
	Royal Military, matriculated 15 May 2008 Escutcheon: Per pale Azure and Gules dexter a scaling ladder Argent ensigned by a mural coronet Or sinister two swords in saltire Argent on a chief Or three grenades Azure enflamed Proper overall an escutcheon of the Royal Union badge. Crest: A dexter arm embowed vambraced gauntleted holding a sprig of three maple leaves and ensigned by the Royal Crown Proper. Motto: Truth Duty Valour
	Toronto Metropolitan, matriculated 18 June 1999 Escutcheon: Azure a right-angled isosceles set square apex downwards Argent on a chief Or an ancient lamp Azure enflamed Proper. Crest: A ram’s head caboshed Argent attired Azure between two maple leaves extending outwards Or. Supporters: On either side a ram Argent attired Azure unguled Or gorged with a wreath of maple leaves Vert charged on the body with a torch Or enflamed Proper enfiled through a right-angled isosceles set square apex downwards Azure. Motto: Mente Et Artificio (With Mind And Hand); Badge: Surmounting two maple leaves in saltire Or and enfiled through a right-angled isosceles set square apex downwards Azure a torch Argent enflamed Proper.
	Queen's at Kingston, matriculated 30 September 1991 Escutcheon: Or on a saltire Azure between in chief a fir tree eradicated in base a thistle stalked and leaved and in fess a red rose barbed seeded and stalked all Proper and a trefoil Vert an open book Or a bordure Gules charged with eight ancient crowns also Or. Motto: Sapientia Et Doctrina Stabilitas (Wisdom And Knowledge Are Guarantees Of Stability)
	Queen's at Kingston - Law, matriculated 20 April 2007 Escutcheon: Azure a saltire Argent surmounted by a sword supporting a balance Or all within a bordure Gules. Crest: Issuant from an ancient crown Azure a demi-griffin Gules armed, beaked and holding between its talons a gavel Or. Motto: Soit Droit Fait (Let Right Be Done)
	Queen's at Kingston - Rector, matriculated 15 October 2004 Badge: On a hurt a demi puma issuant from an ancient crown and holding in the dexter paw a balance Or all encircled by a belt Gules fimbriated buckled its tip adorned with a maple leaf and inscribed PRINCEPS SERVUSQUE ES meaning "Be a leader and a servant", in letters Or.
	St Jerome's, matriculated 20 December 2013 Escutcheon: Per bend Or and Vert a bend counterchanged between in chief a rose Or barbed, fimbriated and environed by two thorn branches in saltire Vert and in base three fleurs-de-lis Or on a chief Vert a lion couchant guardant Or. Upper Motto: In Sanctitate Et Iustitia (In Holiness And Righteousness); Lower Motto: Splendescit Ardor Laboris (The Intensity Of Your Work Shines Forth)
	Toronto, matriculated 20 May 2016 Escutcheon: Azure two open books above a beaver statant Proper on a chief Argent the Royal Crown Proper. Crest: An oak tree Or leaved Vert fructed Or. Motto: VELUT ARBOR ӔVO (As A Tree Over Time)
	Toronto - Erindale, matriculated 8 January 1975 Escutcheon: Vert a Chevron barry wavy Argent and Azure a Bordure embattled Or. Crest: On a Wreath Or and Vert Issuing from the battlements of a Tower proper rising from Water barry wavy Azure and Argent an Oak Tree fructed Or leaved proper. Motto: Tantum Nobis Creditum (So Much Has Been Entrusted To Us)
	Toronto - Faculty Club, matriculated 17 January 2007 Escutcheon: Azure an open book Or between in chief two saltires each composed of a knife and fork and in base a goblet Argent. Crest: On a mound Vert in front of an oak tree Or leaved Vert fructed Or a beaver passant holding in the dexter paw a primrose Proper. Motto: Ad Alimentum Mentis (Nourishment For The Mind)
	Toronto - Forestry, matriculated 17 January 2007 Escutcheon: Barry wavy Argent and Azure a spruce tree eradicated Vert dimidiating an oak tree eradicated Or fructed Vert. Crest: On a mount Vert a beaver sejant Proper holding between its forelegs a closed book Vert charged with an ancient crown Or. Motto: In Reliquum Tempus Arbores Hodie (Trees Today For The Rest Of Time); First badge: A stag trippant reguardant Or attired and unguled Argent supporting with the dexter foreleg a staff terminating in a cross Or flying therefrom a pennon Argent charged with a cross Gules. Second badge: On a roundel per fess Sable and Gules, an altar cross Argent.
	Toronto - Knox, matriculated 15 December 2003 Escutcheon: Per saltire Argent and Purpure in chief a terrestrial globe Azure its lines of latitude and longitude Argent in base a bush enflamed Proper. Crest: An open book Argent bound Purpure irradiated Or. Motto: Verbum Dat Lucem (The Word Gives Light); Badge: The Arms surmounting an open book Argent bound Purpure.
	Toronto - Leslie Dan Pharmacy, matriculated 15 March 2015 Escutcheon: Gules a balance Or on a chief Sable an open book between two mortars and pestles Or. Crest: An oak tree Gules leaved Or fructed of acorns Gules husked Sable. Motto: Trutina Penso Doctrinae (I Weigh By The Balance Of Learning)
	Toronto - Medical Alumni, matriculated 22 July 1998 (16 September 2002) Escutcheon: Argent semé of ankhs on a cross engrailed Sable between four bezants a lozenge Or charged with a staff of Aesculapius Vert all within a bordure compony Gules and Or counter-compony Or and Azure. Crest: Rising from a mound Vert between two acorns Or leaved Vert an oak tree Or leaved Vert fructed Or. Motto: Semper Floreat (May It Flourish Always) Standard: In hoist the Arms of the Medical Alumni Association of the University of Toronto as granted by me on the 22nd day of July 1998 and entered in Volume III page 263 of the Public Register of Arms Flags and Badges of Canada (Argent semé of ankhs on a cross engrailed Sable between four bezants a lozenge Or charged with a staff of Aesculapius Vert all within a bordure compony Gules and Or counter-compony Or and Azure) the fly Or charged with the Crest of the said Association (Rising from a mound Vert between two acorns Or leaved Vert an oak tree Or leaved Vert fructed Or) between two representations of the Badge separated by two bends Argent fimbriated Azure inscribed SEMPER FLOREAT meaning "May it flourish always" in letters Sable; Badge: Encircled by a wreath of oak leaves Vert fructed Or a lozenge Or charged with a rod of Aesculapius Vert within a bordure quarterly Gules and Azure.
	Toronto - Medicine, matriculated 4 June 1998 Escutcheon: Argent semé of ankhs Sable on a cross engrailed also Sable between four bezants a lozenge Or charged with a staff of Aesculapius Vert. Crest: On a mound Vert an oak tree Or leaved Vert fructed Or. Motto: Medicus Servit Servat Deus (The Physician Serves God Preserves)
	Toronto - Theology, matriculated 1 March 2001 Escutcheon: Argent a cross Azure between four oak leaves fructed Vert, overall an open book Argent bound Sable inscribed with the Greek word ÓYNEPÃOYNTEÓ. Motto: ÓYNEPÃOYNTEÓ (We Work Together With Him)
	Toronto - Theology - St. Augustine's, matriculated 20 April 1996 Escutcheon: Gules a chalice Or on a chief Azure nowy inwards rays wavy Or issuant from the nowy segment. Crest: Issuant from a coronet érablé Or an open book Argent bound Vert. Motto: Solis Instar Sola Regnet Caritas (May Love Reign Alone Like The Sun)
	Toronto - St. Hilda's, matriculated 18 August 1989 Escutcheon: Azure on a fess between three fleur de lys Argent an open book also Argent edged Or bound Azure. Motto: Timor Dei Principium Sapientiae
	Toronto - Trinity, matriculated 18 October 1989 Escutcheon: The Arms of the Anglican Bishopric of Toronto namely Azure a crosier in bend dexter surmounted by a key in bend sinister Or between an Imperial Crown in chief two open books in fess Proper and a dove in base Argent holding in the beak an olive branch Vert impaling Azure a stag trippant reguardant Or attired and unguled Argent all within a bordure Gold. Crest: A closed book laid flat bound Vert garnished Or reposing thereon a mitre Or the orphreys Azure charged with fourteen trillia flowers leaved Proper (seven manifest). Supporters: On the dexter side a unicorn and on the sinister side a Canadian deer both reguardant Or unguled and respectively armed and attired Argent langued Azure the compartment comprising a grassy mount growing therefrom seven trillia leaved Proper. Motto: MET AΓΩNA ΣTEΦANOΣ (After The Struggle The Crown)
	Toronto - Trinity - Divinity, matriculated 15 October 2004 Escutcheon: Quarterly Sable and Gules on a cross Argent between four stags trippant reguardant Or attired and unguled Argent an open book Argent edged Or bound and inscribed BUT IF THE SALT in letters Sable. Motto: But If The Salt; First badge: A stag trippant reguardant Or attired and unguled Argent supporting with the dexter foreleg a staff terminating in a cross Or flying therefrom a pennon Argent charged with a cross Gules. Second badge: On a roundel per fess Sable and Gules, an altar cross Argent.
	Toronto - University College, matriculated 20 May 2016 Escutcheon: Gules on a chevron Argent between in chief two open books and in base a beaver statant the Royal Crown all Proper. Crest: An antique lamp Proper. Motto: Parem Claris Lucem Dare (To Shed A Little Light On That Which Is Obscure)
	Toronto - Woodsworth, matriculated 15 October 2006 Escutcheon: Or a quarter Gules overall an open book within three wreathes of laurel all counterchanged. Crest: An oak tree Gules fructed Or dimidiating a maple tree Or. Motto: Propositi Tenax (Firm Of Purpose); Badge: Upon a sun in splendour Or with a quarter Gules overall two ragged staves in saltire counterchanged.
	Toronto - Wycliffe, matriculated 15 March 2007 Escutcheon: Azure on a fess Argent between in chief a maple leaf between two cross-crosslets Or and in base an open book Proper bound Gules edged and irradiated Or a key surmounting a pastoral staff in saltire Azure. Motto: Verbum Domine Manet (The Word Of The Lord Endureth)
	Trent - Lady Eaton, matriculated 29 November 1989 Escutcheon: Or a demi broad sword in pale Azure issuant from the base and charged at the crossing with a rose Or in dexter chief and sinister base a sprig of sumac leaved and fructed Gules and in sinister chief and dexter base an open book Argent bound and edged Gules on a chief Azure a barrulet undy Or. Crest: Rising out of a coronet of maple leaves and clusters of sumac berries Gules a demi stag rampant Or. Motto: Sapientia Et Humanitas (Wisdom And Humanity); Badge: Two broad swords in saltire points downwards Azure surmounted by a toad statant Or charged with a Tudor rose barbed and seeded Proper.
	Waterloo, matriculated 20 May 2016 Escutcheon: Or on a chevron Sable between three lions rampant Gules a chevronel Argent. Crest: Between two maple branches in saltire a trillium displayed and leaved all Proper. Motto: Concordia Cum Veritate (As A Tree Over Time)
	Waterloo - Renison, matriculated 15 February 2011 Escutcheon: Argent on a bend Vert between two maple leaves Gules a mitre between two Maltese crosses Or all within a bordure Vert charged with three buckles between three maple leaves Or. Crest: A moose’s head erased Gules attired Or and charged on the neck with a passion cross Argent. Motto: Sed Coelum Solum (But Under One Sky)
	Western Ontario, matriculated 15 October 1993 Escutcheon: Per saltire Purpure and Argent in chief an open book Proper edged and clasped Or in fess two hurts each charged with a demi lion rampant double queued issuant Ermine ducally crowned Or and in base within an annulet a stag trippant Argent on a Chief Or a sun rising Gules. Crest: In front of a branch of maple Gules an open book as in the arms. Supporters: On a grassy mound Vert dexter a moose and sinister a lynx both Or. Motto: Veritas Et Utilitas (Truth And Utility)
	Western Ontario - Huron, matriculated 20 November 1992 Escutcheon: The Arms of the Anglican Bishop of Huron namely Gules two swords in saltire Argent hilts and pommels Or between in chief a representation of the Royal Crown and in base a beaver Proper and for difference a bordure compony Argent and Gules.
	Western Ontario - Huron Corporation, matriculated 15 September 2005 Escutcheon: The Arms of the Anglican Bishop of Huron namely Gules two swords in saltire Argent hilts and pommels Or between in chief a representation of the Royal Crown and in base a beaver Proper and for difference a bordure compony Argent and Gules. Crest: A beaver sejant holding a mitre (mitra pretiosa) Proper. Supporters: Dexter a stag Ermine attired unguled and gorged with a collar Gules pendent therefrom a golpe charged with a crescent Or sinister a lion double-queued Ermine armed and langued Gules ducally crowned Or gorged with a collar Gules pendent therefrom a golpe charged with an estoile of twelve points Or both standing on a grassy mound Vert strewn with trillium flowers Proper. Motto: Vera Religio Ac Scientia Vera (True Religion And Sound Learning); Badge (General): On a torteau irradiated of sixteen points a beaver Or. Badge (Faculty of Theology): A vesica piscis charged with a mitre Or orphreys and infulae Gules, surmounting a cross patonce Gules environed by a ribbon Argent inscribed WOE IS UNTO ME IF I PREACH NOT THE GOSPEL in letters Sable.
	Wilfrid Laurier, matriculated 31 October 1989 Escutcheon: Gules three maple leaves conjoined on one stem Argent on a chief Purpure fimbriated Argent dexter a Luther rose Argent heart Gules cross Argent and sinister an open book proper edged Purpure bound Argent. Crest: A beaver sejant rampant Or holding in its forepaws a torch Purpure enflamed Proper. Supporters: On either side a doe Or gorged with a collar divided rayonné Purpure and Or the whole upon a grassy mount adorned with three Luther roses as in the Arms. Motto: Veritas Omnia Vincit (Truth Conquers All); Flag: A banner of the Arms of Wilfrid Laurier University the three edges in chief, fly and base charged with a bordure compony Or and Purpure.
	Wilfrid Laurier - Students' Union, matriculated 15 January 2003 Escutcheon: Argent a sprig of three maple leaves Gules on a chief wavy Purpure a bar wavy Or below a Luther rose (Argent seeded of a heart Gules bearing a Latin cross Argent) and an antique lamp Argent enflamed Or. Crest: A demi-sun in splendour Or charged with a pair of maple seeds Gules. Supporters: Two hawks wings elevated and addorsed Or each gorged with a collar per fess rayonné Purpure and Or standing on a cement beam Purpure. Motto: Necessitatibys Scholasticorum Providere (Providing For The Needs Of Students); Badge: A hawk stooping to the sinister Or.
	Windsor, matriculated 15 March 2007 Escutcheon: Or three piles two in chief and one in base reversed Azure those in chief charged with a fleur-de-lis and a maple leaf Or that in base charged with a lily flower slipped Argent winged Or overall a fess enarched Or masoned Gules. Crest: A cross Sable in front of two seaxes in saltire Gules all irradiated Or. Supporters: Dexter a Canadian deer sinister a moose both guardant Or and standing on a grassy mount Vert; Motto: Bonitatem Disciplinam Scientiam (Goodness Discipline Knowledge)
	Windsor - Canterbury, matriculated 20 April 2012 Escutcheon: Azure on a pall Argent edged and fringed Or between two roses Argent barbed and seeded Proper each charged with a like rose Gules and dimidiating a lily flower slipped Proper winged Or three swords in pairle points outward Gules. Crest: Within a circlet of maple leaves Or a mount Vert thereon a deer statant guardant Gules supporting with the dexter hoof a book Argent garnished Azure charged with a cross paty fitchy Sable. Motto: Let Reasonableness Flourish
	Windsor - Essex, matriculated 15 March 2007 Escutcheon: Barry wavy of eight Argent and Azure on a pile Vert a portcullis chained Or. Crest: In front of a Canada goose rising proper collared chequy Or and Vert a seax fesswise point to the sinister Proper pommel and hilt Or. Motto: Scientia Porta Veritatis (Knowledge Is The Gateway To Truth)
	York - Osgoode Hall Law, matriculated 15 March 2016 Escutcheon: Per pale, dexter, Gules a Doric column Or ensigned by a beaver couchant Proper and entwined about by an escrol Argent inscribed MAGNA CHARTA ANGLIÆ, meaning “The Magna Carta of England” in letters Sable sinister per fess in chief Azure semé of millrinds a canton Or charged with a lion rampant Purpure (the Honourable Society of Lincoln’s Inn) in base Azure a Pegasus forcene Argent (the Honourable Society of the Inner Temple). Crest: In front of a classical portico Argent an antique lamp Or enflamed Proper. Supporters: Two owls Gules beaked and legged Or gorged with barrister’s bands Argent and standing on stone steps Proper. Motto: Per Jus Ad Justitiam (Through Law To Justice)

== Prince Edward Island ==
Image	Blazon
	Prince Edward Island, matriculated 15 March 2010 Escutcheon: Per chevron Gules and Vert in dexter chief a pair of blacksmith’s tongs Argent between two hammers Or hafted Argent enfiling an annulus Or set with a cross patté Sable in sinister chief three feathers Argent enfiling a coronet of crosses patté and fleurs-de-lis Or and in base an open book Argent edged and bound Or. Crest: On a grassy mount three oak saplings and an oak tree fructed Proper. Supporters: Two panthers Sable standing on a grassy mount Proper. Motto: Fides Scientia Beneficium (Faith Knowledge Service); Flag: Per pale Gules and Vert on a Canadian pale Argent an escutcheon of the Arms.

== Quebec ==
Image	Blazon
	Bishop's, matriculated 12 November 1993 Escutcheon: Argent on a cross of St. George an open book Proper bound and edged Or in the first quarter two croziers in saltire Gules. Crest: A closed book laid flat bound Purpure edged Argent thereon a mitre Argent orphreys Purpure charged with fleurs-de-lys and maple leaves alternately Argent the infulae Purpure. Supporters: On a compartment composed of grassy mounds charged with a pall wavy Argent dexter a white tailed stag (Odocoileus virginianus) Argent unguled and attired Purpure sinister a bear (Ursus americanus) Argent armed Purpure supporting a staff flying therefrom to the sinister the Flag of Bishop's University. Motto: Recti Cultus Pectora Roborant (Good Learning Habits Strengthen The Hearts); Flag: Purpure on a Canadian pale Argent the shield of Arms of Bishop's University fimbriated Purpure. Badge: Two croziers in saltire Or surmounted by an alligator rampant Purpure embellished Argent gaitered Gules.
	Trois-Rivières, matriculated 20 August 2010 Escutcheon: Argent three piles throughout conjoined in base Vert on a fess Or three mortarboards Vert. Crest: Issuant from a circlet of iris versicolor flowers and white pine branches the observatory of the Pierre-Boucher building Proper. Supporters: A Patriote man and a Patriote woman standing on a grassy mount set with flaxleaf asters Proper; Motto: De La Connaissance Jusqu’au Savoir (From Learning To Knowledge); Flag: Purpure on a Canadian pale Argent the shield of Arms of Bishop's University fimbriated Purpure. Badge: Two croziers in saltire Or surmounted by an alligator rampant Purpure embellished Argent gaitered Gules.
	Laval, matriculated 17 August 1990 Escutcheon: Gules on a cross Or between sixteen allerions Argent five escallops Azure. Motto: Deo Favente Haud Pluribus Impar (By The Grace Of God To No One Equal)
	Laval - Faculty of Business Administration, matriculated 20 January 2012 Escutcheon: Argent on a pile reversed throughout Azure between a caduceus Gules its serpents Vert and a torch Vert enflamed Gules a schooner Argent set on four bars wavy and ensigned by a mullet Or. Crest: The helmet of Hermes Sable winged Or. Motto: Scientia Animoque Praesse (To Excel Through Knowledge And Character); Badge: On a hurt a schooner Argent, all within a belt Gules edged, buckled, its tip adorned with a mullet and inscribed with the Motto in letters Or.
	McGill, matriculated 12 June 1992 Escutcheon: Argent three martlets Gules on a chief dancetty Gules an open book proper garnished Or bearing the legend IN DOMINO CONFIDO in letters Sable between two crowns fleur-de-lisées Argent. Motto: Grandescunt Aucta Labore (By Work All Things Increase And Grow)
	Montreal Diocesan, matriculated 11 May 1998 Escutcheon: Azure an anchor flukes flory and in chief two martlets respectant Or. Crest: On a mound Vert an ox statant Or winged Argent nimbed Azure the dexter foreleg resting on an open book Argent bound Azure inscribed in letters Sable DEO GRATIAS. Motto: Pro Christo Et Ecclesia (For Christ And The Church)
	Sherbrooke, matriculated 15 January 2004 Escutcheon: Quarterly Vert and Or a cross quarterly counterchanged in the dexter canton a fleur-de-lis Or overall an open book Argent bound Sable. Motto: Veritatem In Charitate (Truth In Love)

== Saskatchewan ==
Image	Blazon
	Regina, matriculated 20 December 2013 Escutcheon: Vert a chevron between in chief an open book flanked by two ancient crowns and in base a garb Or. Crest: A cross potent within a crescent Or. Motto: As One Who Serves; Flag: Or an escutcheon of the arms. Badge: On an oval Vert a garb enfiling an ancient crown Or.
	Saskatchewan, matriculated 15 February 2001 Escutcheon: Vert an open book Argent inscribed DEO ET PATRIAE in letters Sable between three garbs Or.
