= Public Register of Arms, Flags and Badges of Canada =

Register of heraldic emblems

The Public Register of Arms, Flags and Badges of Canada contains the heraldic emblems that have been granted, registered, approved or confirmed by the Canadian Heraldic Authority since its inception on June 4, 1988. In 2005, the Canadian Heraldic Authority began the process of creating a digital version of the register available online.

Completed grant documents are recorded in the register and the notice of the grant is published in the Canada Gazette. The register is divided up in volumes, with each volume being reserved for each serving Governor General since 1988:

- Volume I is for arms granted during the term of Jeanne Sauvé, 1988–1990
- Volume II for Ramon Hnatyshyn, 1990–1995
- Volume III for Roméo LeBlanc, 1995–1999
- Volume IV for Adrienne Clarkson, 1999–2005
- Volume V for Michaëlle Jean, 2005–2010
- Volume VI for David Johnston, 2010–2017
- Volume VII for Julie Payette, 2017–2021
- Volume VIII for Mary Simon, 2021–

Requests for registrations of existing arms also take the form of a "petition", as described above. The CHA will normally only register existing arms if the petitioner was unable to petition for a Canadian grant at the time the existing arms were granted, i.e., the arms of immigrants or arms granted to Canadians before the creation of the CHA in 1988. In addition, the existing arms must normally come from a source recognized by the Chief Herald (e.g. the Chief Herald of Ireland, College of Arms, Lord Lyon, the South African Bureau of Heraldry, etc.).

Registration documents are recorded in the Public Register, and the notice of the registration is published in the Gazette. If the petitioner so desires, their design can be published in the Trademarks Journal. That can be arranged through the offices of the Canadian Heraldic Authority, but a separate fee is required which is paid to the Registrar of Trademarks.

== See also ==
- Royal Heraldry Society of Canada
