= Trinity College, Toronto =

Federated university in the University of Toronto

Trinity College
- Coat of arms
- Latin: Collegium Sacrosanctæ Trinitatis
- Other name: University of Trinity College
- Motto: Μετ’ ἀγῶνα στέφανος (Ancient Greek) (Met’agona stephanos)
- Motto in English: "After the contest, the crown"
- Type: Federated university
- Established: August 2, 1851 (175 years ago)
- Founder: John Strachan
- Parent institution: University of Toronto
- Religious affiliation: Anglican Church of Canada
- Academic affiliations: Universities Canada
- Endowment: CA$90.9 million (2024)
- Chancellor: Brian Lawson
- Provost: Nicholas Terpstra
- Undergraduates: 1,763 (Faculty of Arts)
- Postgraduates: 100 (Faculty of Divinity)
- Location: 6 Hoskin Avenue, Toronto, Ontario, Canada; 43°39′56″N 79°23′45″W
- Newspaper: Trinity Times
- Colours: Blue, gold, red, and black
- Website: trinity.utoronto.ca

Ontario Heritage Act
- Criteria: Designated Part IV
- Designated: May 30, 1988

Trinity College (also known as the University of Trinity College) is a federated university in the University of Toronto, located on its St. George campus in downtown Toronto, Ontario, Canada. The institution was founded in 1851 by Bishop John Strachan. Strachan originally intended for Trinity to be a university of strong Anglican alignment, after the University of Toronto severed its ties with the Church of England. After five decades as an independent institution, Trinity joined the University of Toronto in 1904 as a member of its collegiate federation.

Today, Trinity College consists of a secular undergraduate Faculty of Arts and a postgraduate Faculty of Divinity, the latter of which is part of the Toronto School of Theology. Through its diploma granting authority in the field of divinity, Trinity maintains legal university status. Trinity's Faculty of Arts is one of the seven undergraduate colleges in the University of Toronto Faculty of Arts and Science, and hosts three undergraduate programs: international relations; ethics, society and law; and immunology.

More than half of Trinity students graduate from the University of Toronto with distinction or high distinction. The university has produced 44 Rhodes Scholars as of 2026. Among the university's more notable collections are a seventeenth-century Flemish tapestry, two first-edition theses by Martin Luther, numerous original, signed works by Winston Churchill, a 1491 edition of Dante's Divine Comedy censored by the Spanish Inquisition, and Bishop Strachan's silver epergne.

Among the University of Toronto's colleges and federated universities, Trinity is notable for being the smallest by population, and for its trappings of Oxbridge heritage. Trinity manages its student government through direct democracy, and hosts a litany of clubs and societies.

== History ==
=== Founding ===
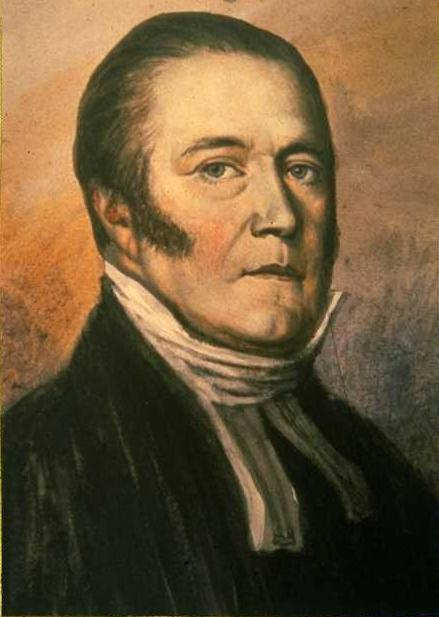
John Strachan

John Strachan (1778–1867) was an Anglican priest, Archdeacon of York, and staunch supporter of Upper Canada's conservative Family Compact. Strachan was interested in education, and as early as 1818 petitioned the colonial House of Assembly for the formation of a theological university. In 1826, Lieutenant Governor Sir Peregrine Maitland commissioned Strachan to visit England and obtain a royal charter for a provincial university. Strachan was successful, and returned in 1827 with a charter from King George IV to establish King's College in Upper Canada. King's College was effectively controlled by the Church of England and members of the elite Family Compact, and at first reflected Strachan's ambition for an institution of conservative, High Anglican character. Strachan objected to proposals for the provincial university to be without a religious affiliation, dubbing such a suggestion "atheistical, and so monstrous in its consequences that, if successfully carried out, it would destroy all that is pure and holy in morals and religion, and would lead to greater corruption than anything adopted during the madness of the French Revolution."

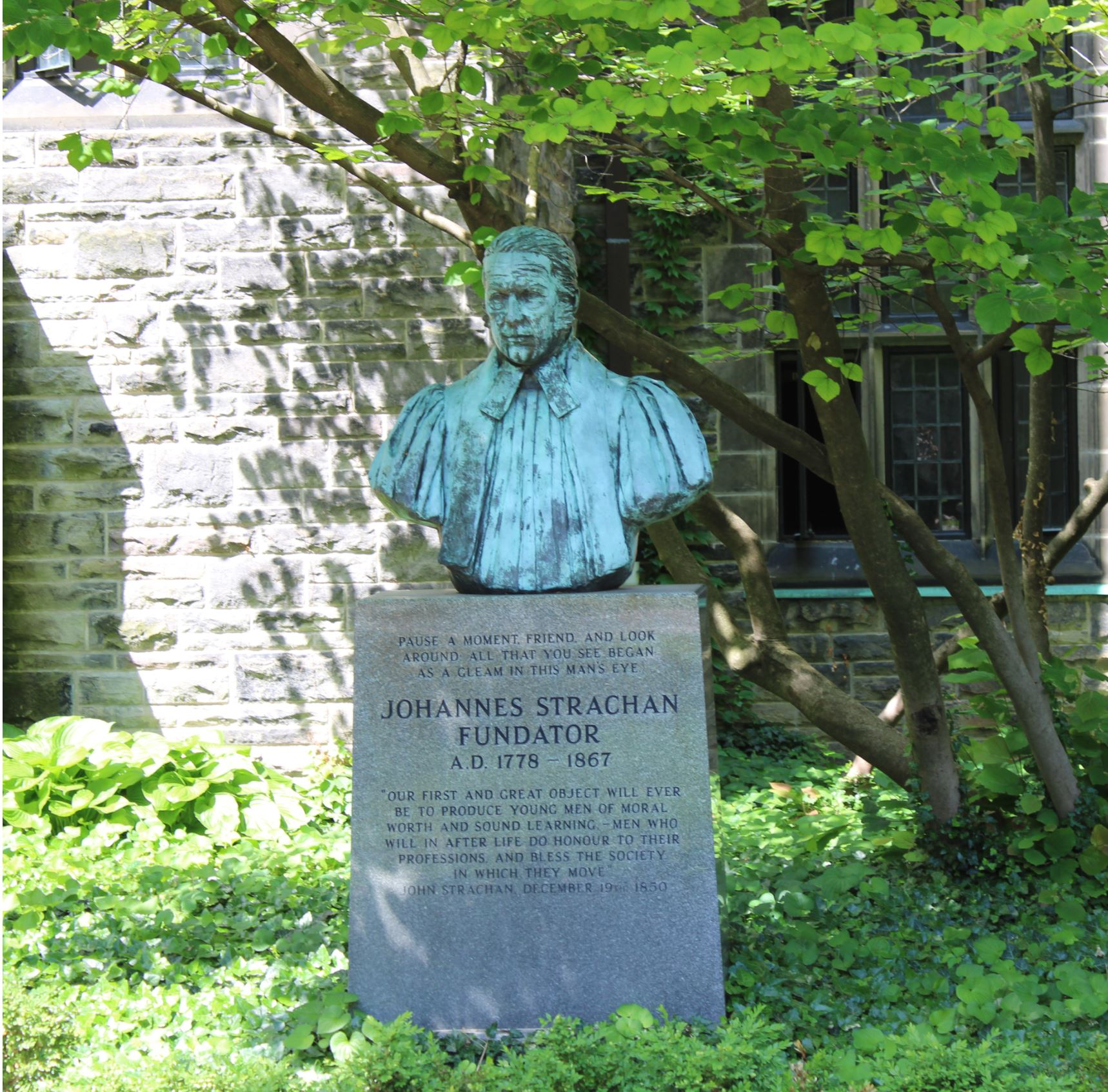
Bust of John Strachan in the Trinity quad, 2020

In 1849, over strong opposition from Strachan, Robert Baldwin's Reformist government took control of the college and secularized it to become the University of Toronto. Incensed by this decision, Strachan immediately began raising funds for the creation of a new university. Strachan canvassed Great Britain and Upper Canada for donations, and although he fell short of his goal of £30,000, he received significant commitments from the Society for the Propagation of the Gospel, the Duke of Wellington, William Gladstone, and Oxford University. Despite Strachan's public anti-Americanism, the project for a new Anglican university attracted substantial donations from a fundraising campaign in the United States by The Reverend William McMurray. On April 30, 1851, now-Bishop Strachan led a parade of clergy, schoolboys, and prospective faculty from the Church of St George the Martyr to the site of the new Trinity College. There, Strachan delivered a speech repeating his condemnation of the "destruction of King's College as a Christian institution," and promised that Trinity would fulfil the role of a church university. The Provincial Parliament incorporated Trinity College as an independent university on August 2, 1851. The following year, Strachan, now in his 70s, obtained a Royal Charter for Trinity from Queen Victoria. The university opened to students on January 15, 1852. Most of the first class of students and faculty came from the Diocesan Theological Institute, an Anglican seminary in Cobourg also founded by Strachan in 1842, which dissolved itself in favour of Trinity.

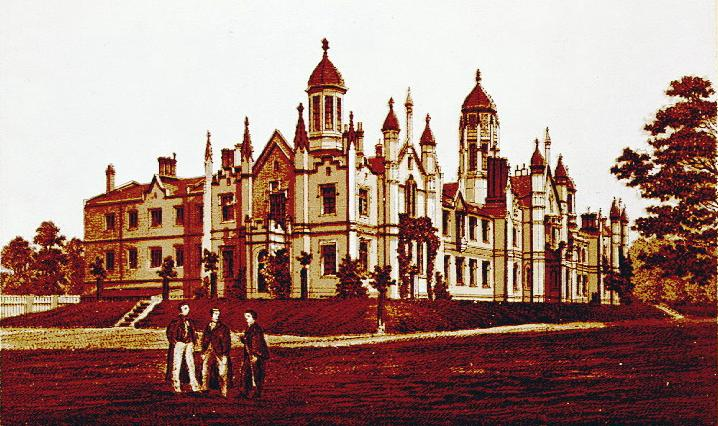
The original Gothic Revival Trinity College, circa 1852 by architect Kivas Tully

Unlike the University of Toronto, all of Trinity's students and faculty were required to be members of the Anglican Church. This was actually a stronger condition than the original King's College, which only held a religious test for faculty members and students of divinity. Applicants to Trinity's Faculty of Arts were required to pass exams in biblical history, Latin, Greek, arithmetic, algebra, and Euclid. Applicants for the divinity school were required to have a bachelor's degree in arts, and to pass oral exams from the Provost in the New Testament, church catechism, Latin, and Greek.

At the opening of the university, Bishop Strachan used the metaphor of the family to describe Trinity. Per Strachan, Trinity would "constitute a great Christian household, the domestic home of all who resort to it for instruction, framing them in the Christian graces, and in all sound learning, and sanctifying their knowledge, abilities and attainments to the service of God and the welfare of their fellow-men." The usage of the family metaphor was common at the time, and reflected a common view in Upper Canada that schools were extensions of the family model.

=== Early years ===
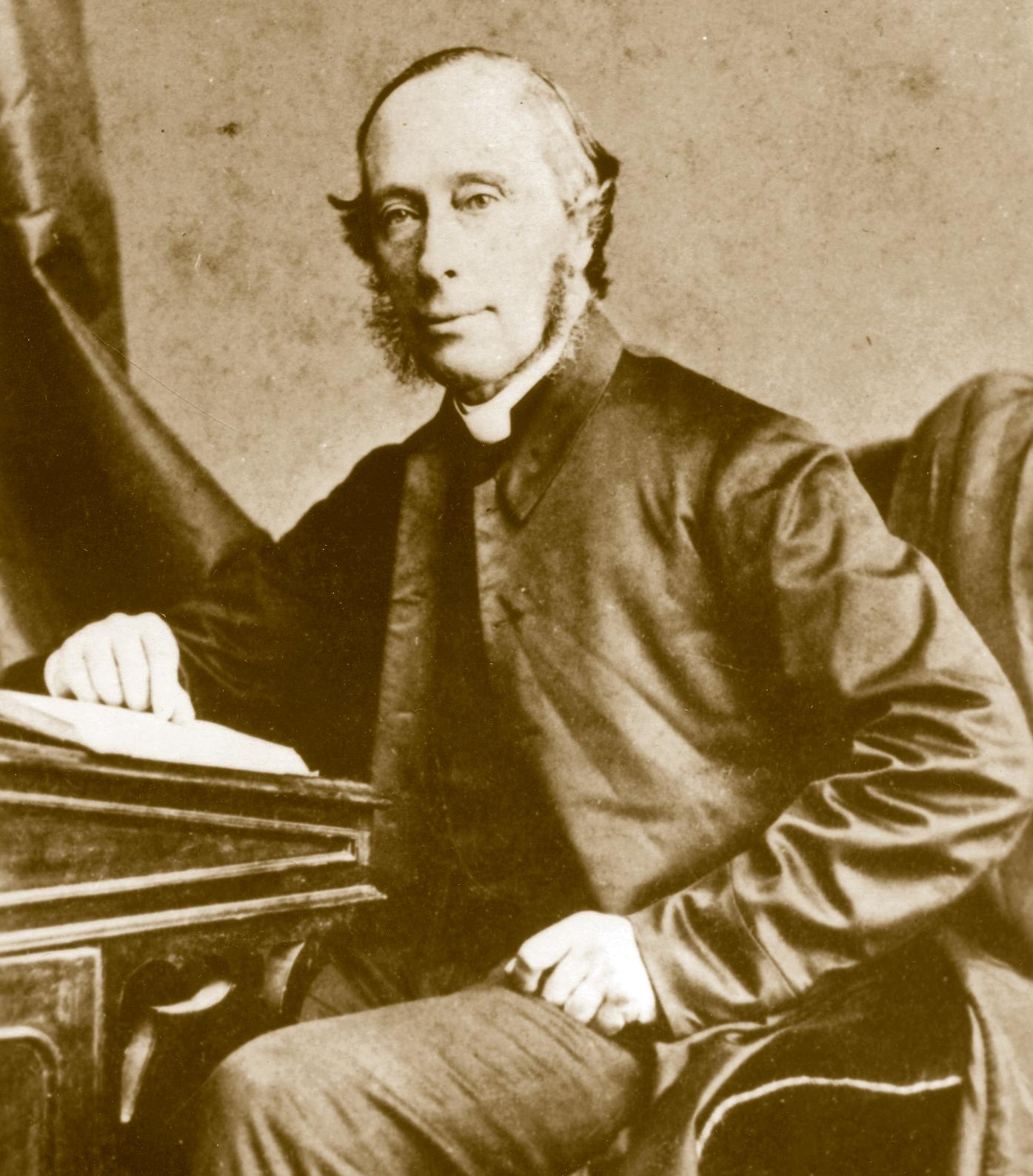
Provost George Whitaker

Designed by Kivas Tully, the original Trinity College building was constructed in 1851 on Queen Street West, in what was then an undeveloped western end outside the Toronto city bounds. The building featured Gothic Revival design, and was inspired by St. Aidan's Theological College, Birkenhead.

Discipline in the early years was strict. All students were subject to a rigid curfew, and daily chapel attendance was mandatory. If a student wished to leave Trinity grounds, they were required to wear a cap and gown. The university was deliberately built away from the temptations of the city proper. This was all part of Strachan's plan to counteract the University of Toronto's secularism through modelling his vision of conservative Anglican education. Strachan was supported in these efforts by George Whitaker, a clergyman from Cambridge University who served as Trinity's divinity professor and first Provost. Strachan's hatred of the secular university was so great that Trinity's student athletes were forbidden to compete against students from the University of Toronto. It is not well known what the general student body thought of these rules, although there are records of students having cached their formal garb in the university ravine and clandestinely visiting town in informal clothes. Despite the rigid rules and church culture, beer consumption formed an important element of student life, and students purchased over 100 gallons of ale a year from a nearby brewery.

Bishop Benjamin Cronyn of Huron led an attack on the teaching of Trinity College in the early 1860s. Cronyn was an evangelical low church Anglican, who accused Provost Whitaker of spreading "dangerous" Romish doctrines. The College Corporation struck an investigatory committee to investigate Cronyn's claims. After the committee published its findings, Provost Whitaker received votes of confidence from the corporation, the Synod of Toronto, the Synod of Ontario, and the House of Bishops. Bishop Cronyn responded by resigning from the corporation, withdrawing all connections between the Diocese of Huron and Trinity College, and founding Huron College (today affiliated with Western University). In 1877, Evangelical Anglicans affiliated with St. James Cathedral founded Wycliffe College as a low-church alternative to Trinity within Toronto.

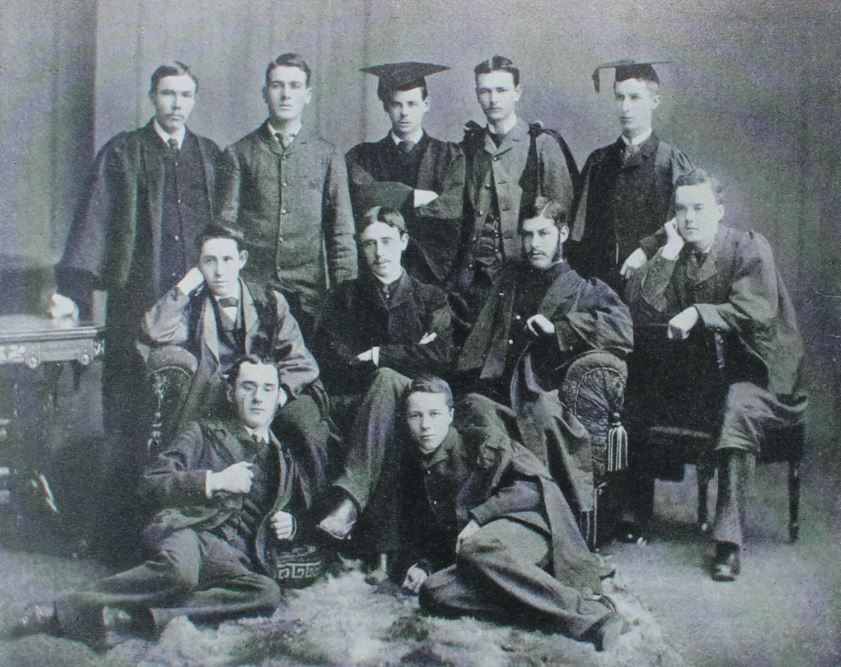
Trinity College's Class of 1882. Famed Canadian poet Archibald Lampman is at the far left, seated

Bishop Strachan died on November 1, 1867 (All Saints' Day). Provost Whitaker committed to maintaining Strachan's vision for the university, and continued to run the institution in strict conformity with conservative church principles. While Whitaker slowly permitted new courses to be offered, Trinity's core subjects remained theology, classics, and mathematics. Despite the urges of the College Council and some students, Whitaker steadfastly rejected federation with the University of Toronto. To Whitaker, the benefits of joining the larger, secular University were outweighed by the "priceless benefits of such an education as can be given only on Christian principles, and under the hallowed shelter of the Church of Christ."

In 1879, Provost Whitaker lost a contentious election to become Bishop of Toronto. This was his third failure seeking the position, and after the loss he resolved to return to his home in England. Whitaker left in 1881, and in his place the College Council appointed the Reverend Charles Body, another clergyman from Cambridge. Body was thirty at the time of his appointment, and significantly reformed the curriculum and policies of Trinity College. Under Provost Body, religious entry-requirements were abolished for non-divinity students, and the first female students were admitted to study. The requirement to wear a cap and gown while leaving university grounds was dropped, although chapel attendance remained mandatory for both divinity and arts students. Body's reforms succeeded in attracting new students, and within a decade enrolment more than doubled.

The original Trinity building suffered from architectural defects. The building was cold in winter, and fireplaces filled the residence rooms with smoke. Until 1888, the university used coal for heating, which generated noxious fumes. Over time, additional wings were added to the university grounds, such as a convocation hall added in 1877 in memory of John Strachan. A designated chapel was built in 1883; previously, chapel had been held in a room originally intended for the university's library. Enrolment grew substantially under Provosts Body and Welch, such that in 1894 the university erected an east wing devoted entirely to student residences.

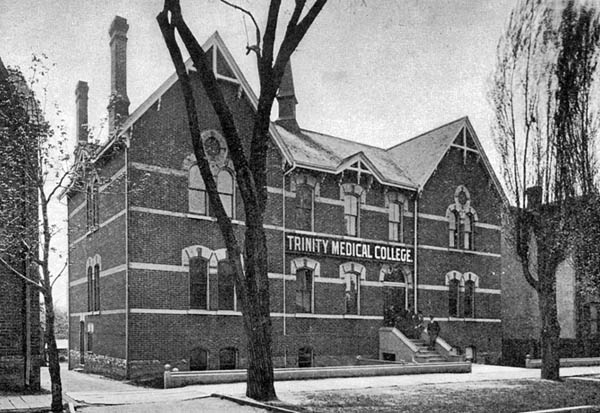
Trinity Medical College in East Toronto

Under Provost Body and his successor Edward Welch, Trinity College gradually expanded its teaching beyond arts and divinity. By the end of the 19th century Trinity offered degrees in a variety of disciplines, including medicine, law, music, pharmacy and dentistry. The connections between the professional faculties and the university proper were however somewhat tenuous, as students generally took classes elsewhere in Toronto, and only came to the Queen Street campus to write exams and accept degrees. Trinity was founded with a medical school run by six Toronto doctors, and the first lecture ever given at Trinity was on "medical jurisprudence". However, the medical faculty dissolved itself in 1856 in protest of the religious entry requirements. Trinity Medical School re-founded itself in 1871, and taught students in a separate building in Toronto's east end. The school (renamed Trinity Medical College in 1888) existed as an independent legal body in voluntary association with Trinity College. Trinity's Faculty of Music started offering degrees in the 1880s, and offered examinations for degrees in London, England, and New York City, as well as Toronto.

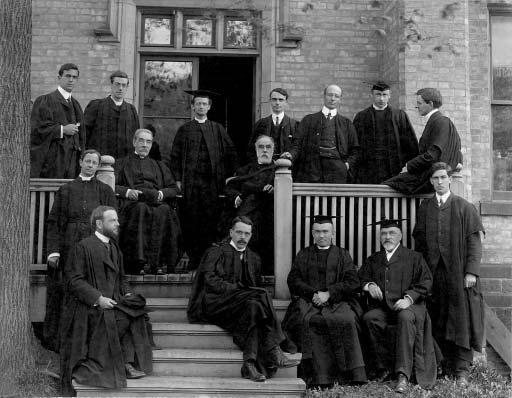
Trinity College faculty at the time of federation

In 1884, Helen Gregory enrolled as the first female student at Trinity College. Gregory graduated with three degrees, and later became a judge in the Vancouver Juvenile Court. St. Hilda's College was created in 1888 as Trinity's women's residence. For the first six years of its existence, female students lived and took all their classes in St. Hilda's. Under Provost Welch, co-education came to Trinity, and the two teaching staffs and sets of courses merged into one.

=== Federation ===
Federation with the University of Toronto was first suggested in 1868, when a financial crisis compelled the College Council to consider uniting with the university to stave off bankruptcy. Provost Body ultimately eschewed federation, favouring significant reforms to encourage applications. Body's reforms were successful, and the university entered a strong financial position across his thirteen-year term. Body retired as Provost in 1894, and his successor Reverend Edward Welch arrived at the beginning of an economic depression. Under Provost Welch, enrolment declined steeply, and by the turn of the century Trinity had returned to financial crisis.

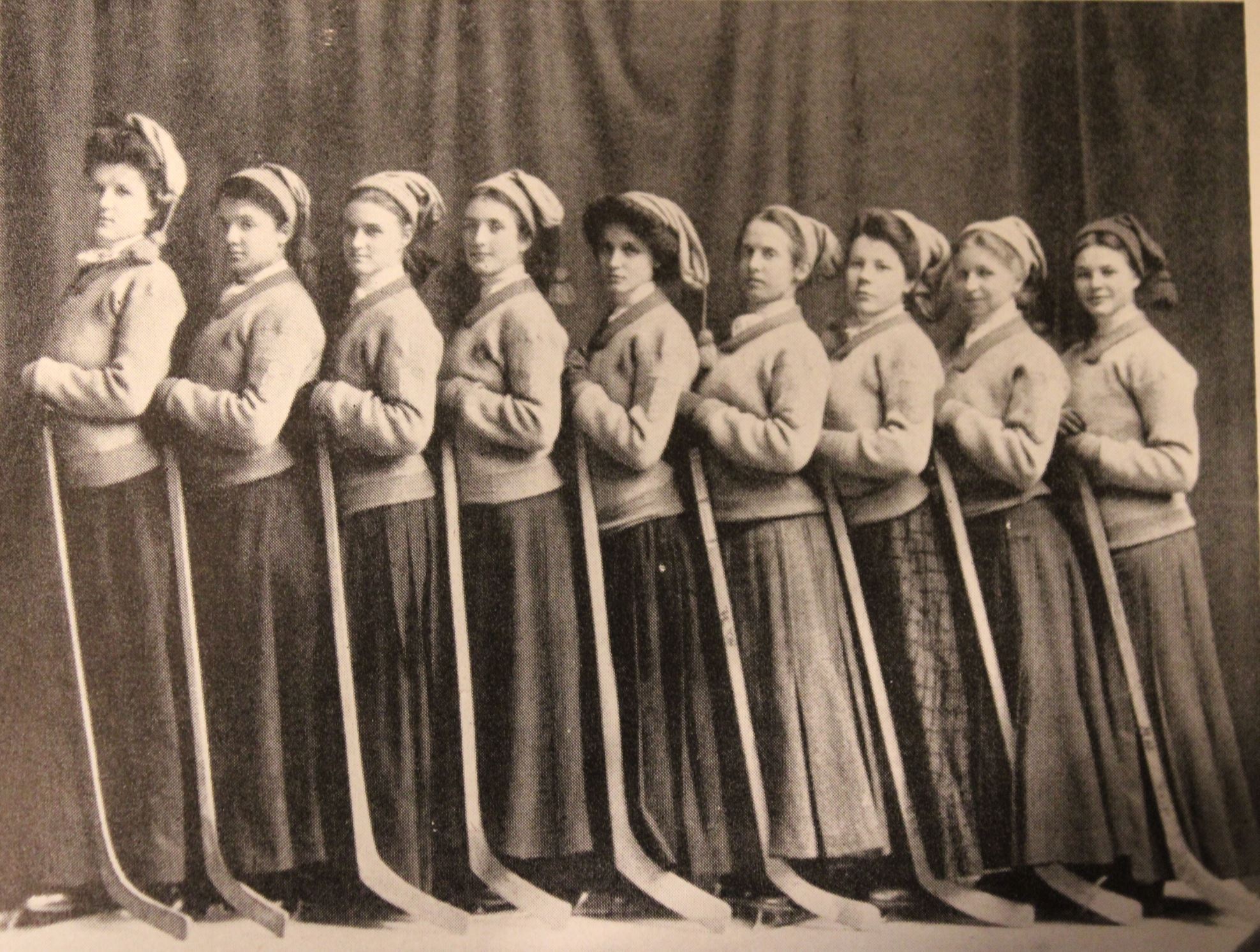
St. Hilda's College Hockey Team, 1904–1905

Provost Thomas C. S. Macklem succeeded Welch in 1900, and entered office in favour of federation with the University of Toronto. In a newspaper interview, Reverend Macklem declared that "the time has come when neither the University of Toronto nor Trinity University can afford to stand aloof from one another any longer without sacrificing a great national ideal." Macklem was Trinity's first Canadian-born Provost, and proved an ardent reformer, who quickly banned beer and hazing over the strong opposition of the student body. In 1901, the Provincial Legislature amended the University of Toronto Act to facilitate a possible federation with Trinity. Trinity celebrated its fiftieth anniversary in 1902, still an independent university, but undergoing negotiations with the University of Toronto on federation. To mark the occasion, Trinity conferred honorary degrees to Premier George William Ross, and renowned physician William Osler. The next year, after what Macklem described as a "long-drawn and bitter" series of debates, the College Corporation voted 121 to 73 in favour of federation with the University of Toronto. Opponents of federation sought a judicial injunction against the agreement, but were unsuccessful. The University of Toronto made a concession to allow Trinity to grant its own degrees in theology, which required the university to remove the restriction from its governing charter.

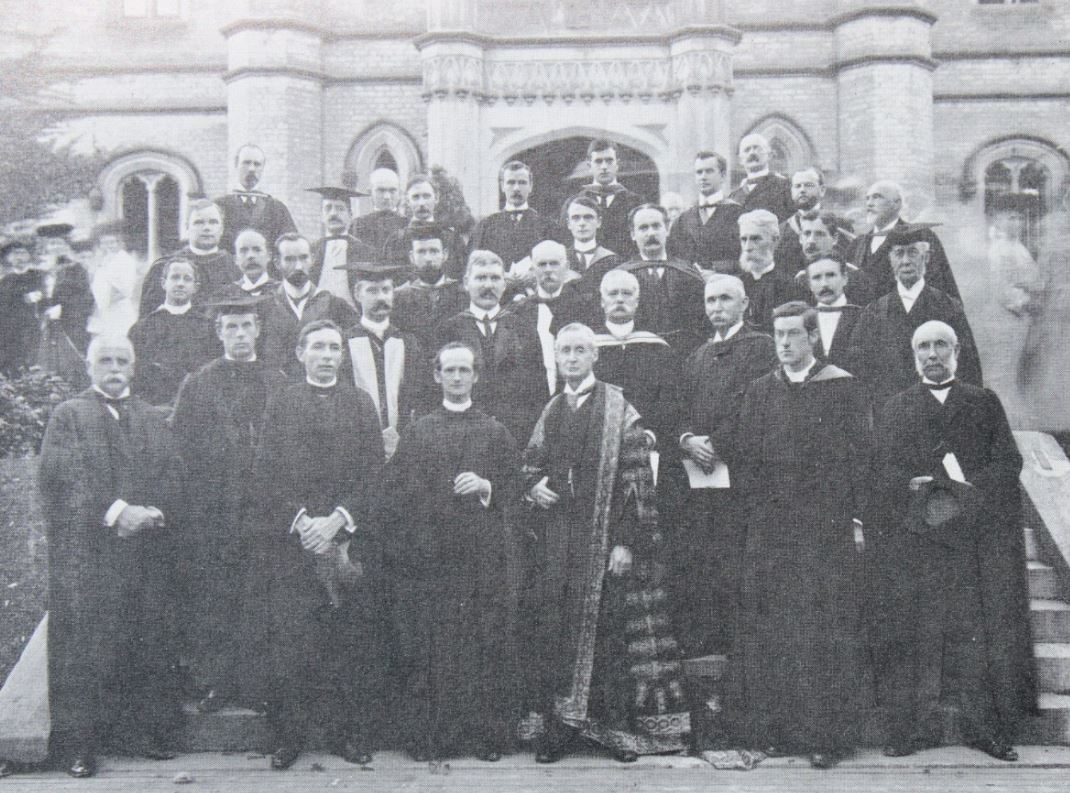
The last graduates from pre-federation Trinity, September 29, 1904. Provost Macklem and Chancellor Robinson are at the front, center

On October 1, 1904, Trinity federated under the University of Toronto, and thereby relinquished its authority to grant degrees in subjects other than theology. At first, Trinity students were required to commute from the Queen Street residence to the main St. George campus for classes, a distance of some three and a half kilometres. While Trinity had been intentionally built in a quiet environment away from the bustle of Toronto, the city had expanded, and Trinity College was now located in a seedy outskirt. Trinity resolved to relocate closer to the St. George campus, and so abandoned plans for a significant expansion at its Queen Street site. The university acquired its present property near Queen's Park on the St. George campus grounds in 1913, but construction of the new Trinity buildings, modelled after the original buildings by Kivas Tully, was not completed until 1925 due to World War I. Five hundred and forty-three Trinity students, staff, and alumni fought in the War, of whom fifty-six died and eighty-six were wounded.

Trinity College's original campus became Trinity Bellwoods Park. The original building was torn down in the 1950s. Of the original campus, only the St. Hilda's women's residence and the entrance gates, constructed in 1904, remain standing.

=== On Hoskin Avenue ===
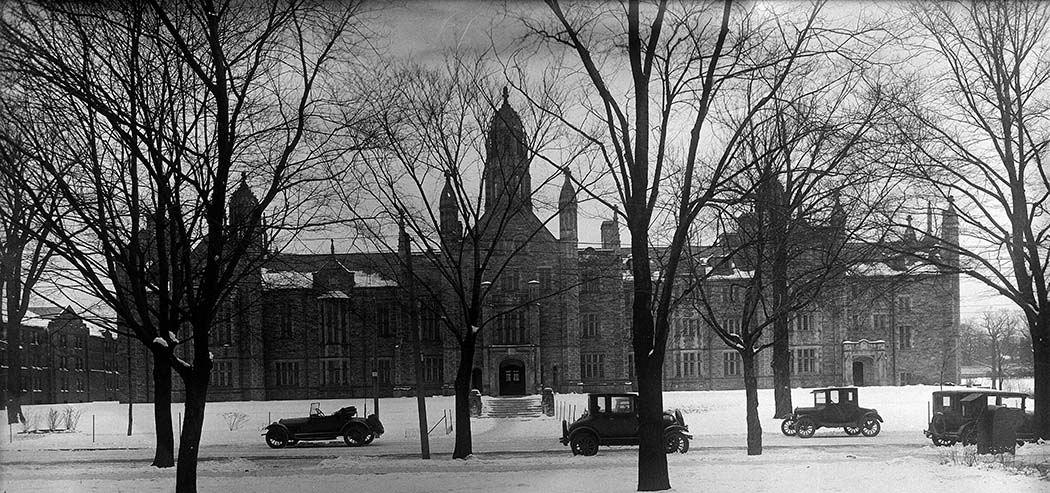
Trinity College on Hoskin Avenue, 1928

When Trinity College moved to its present site on Hoskin Avenue in 1925, there was no space for student residences. Not only had the financial pressure of the War delayed construction of the building, it also necessitated a significant scaling back of the design. While the college originally planned for a campus with two quadrangles, a chapel, and a convocation hall, finances only permitted the construction of the south wing by 1925. The building had no residence space, and so the university rented separate buildings on St. George Street for the male and female students. An increasingly large proportion of students chose not to stay on College residence, and the student culture began slowly to be influenced by the larger University of Toronto.

To counteract the perceived diluting influence of the University of Toronto on Trinity culture, concerned students insisted on wearing College gowns and blazers around campus to classes. In 1949, some students proposed a ban on freshmen joining fraternities, but this was defeated on grounds of impeding on individualism. Trinity engaged in rivalries with nearby colleges, starting with a series of violent raids from University College in the 1920s. Across the 1950s, Trinity entered into a fierce, yet good-natured rivalry with its immediate neighbour (and competing Anglican divinity school) Wycliffe College. This rivalry included reciprocal raids between the colleges, thefts of college artifacts, and one instance in November 1953 when Wycliffe students filled up Trinity's entryway with bricks from the under-construction chapel.

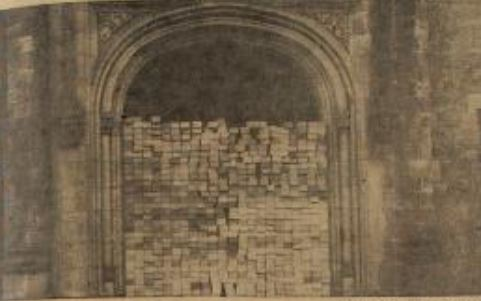
Trinity's main entrance, bricked up by students from Wycliffe College, November 13, 1953

In 1937, construction began on the new St. Hilda's building, located on the east side of Devonshire Place, a short walk from the main Trinity building. Construction was swift, and female students moved in the next year. St. Hilda's Cartwright Hall became the primary stage for dramatics at Trinity for the subsequent four decades. In 1941, the university added an east wing, allowing male students to move out of the temporary accommodations on St. George and onto the university grounds. The same year, the university added a west wing, complete with the Strachan Dining Hall and the Junior Common Room. This substantial expansion was funded by donations from Gerald Larkin of the Salada Tea Company. After the War, Larkin also funded the construction of the Trinity College chapel in 1953. Previously, the university had used Seeley Hall, located over the front entrance and originally intended as the library, as the chapel.

One thousand and eighteen Trinity students, staff, and alumni served in the Second World War. Sixty-six were killed, and thirty-seven wounded. Two were made Commanders of the Order of the British Empire, two Officers of the Order of Orange-Nassau, and two granted the Croix de Guerre. In 1940, one hundred and sixty pupils and fifteen teachers from St. Hilda's School for Girls at Whitby in England were sent to Trinity to escape the German wartime bombings, where they were housed at St. Hilda's College.

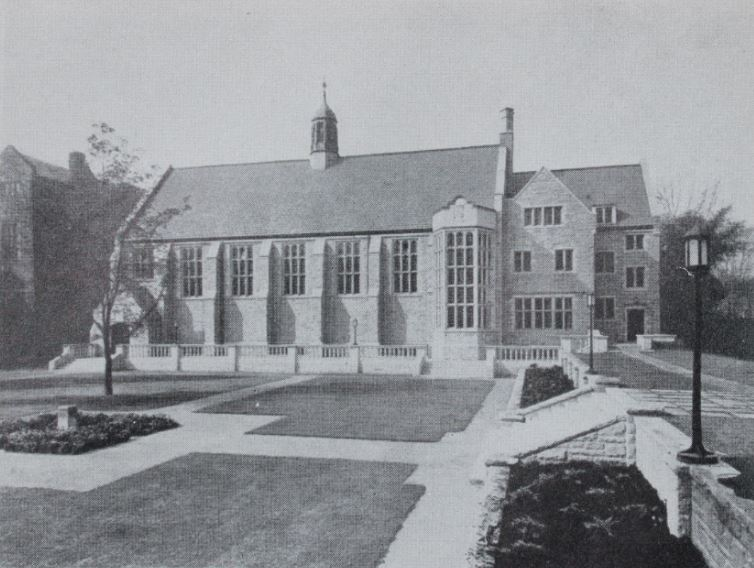
Strachan Hall Exterior, 1941

In 1961, Trinity College completed a new multi-purpose building to its north-west, named after benefactor Gerald Larkin. The Trinity College quadrangle was completed in 1963, when a completed north wing enclosed the land. In 1979, a theater was added to the Larkin Building, named after Provost George Ignatieff, which quickly replaced Cartwright Hall as the primary forum for student drama.

In January 1966, Trinity College hosted the "Trinity College Conference on the Canadian Indian." The Conference included presentations from on and off-reserve indigenous persons, and is believed to be Canada's first student-organized forum on indigenous issues.

George Ignatieff, Canada's former Ambassador to Yugoslavia, NATO, and the United Nations, became Provost in 1972; he was Trinity's first Provost without a theological background. Under Ignatieff, the university integrated its academic programming with the wider University of Toronto to an unprecedented degree. When Ignatieff came to office, the university was deeply in debt. While enrolment remained high, the university was suffering from the policies of the Provincial Government which denied public funds to religious institutions. Due to Trinity's divinity school, it was therefore ineligible for government assistance. As Provost, Ignatieff relieved much of Trinity's faculty, and in 1974 he signed a memorandum of understanding with the University of Toronto's Faculty of Arts and Science, ending much of the Trinity Faculty of Arts' independent academics. Where previously undergraduate students had taken many of their courses at Trinity, thenceforth most courses were taken with students from other colleges under general University of Toronto departments. Similarly, the Faculty of Divinity joined the Toronto School of Theology in 1978, granting its students access to courses at all the university's theological colleges. One exception to this trend of academic integration was the international relations program, founded at Trinity in 1976.

=== Recent years ===
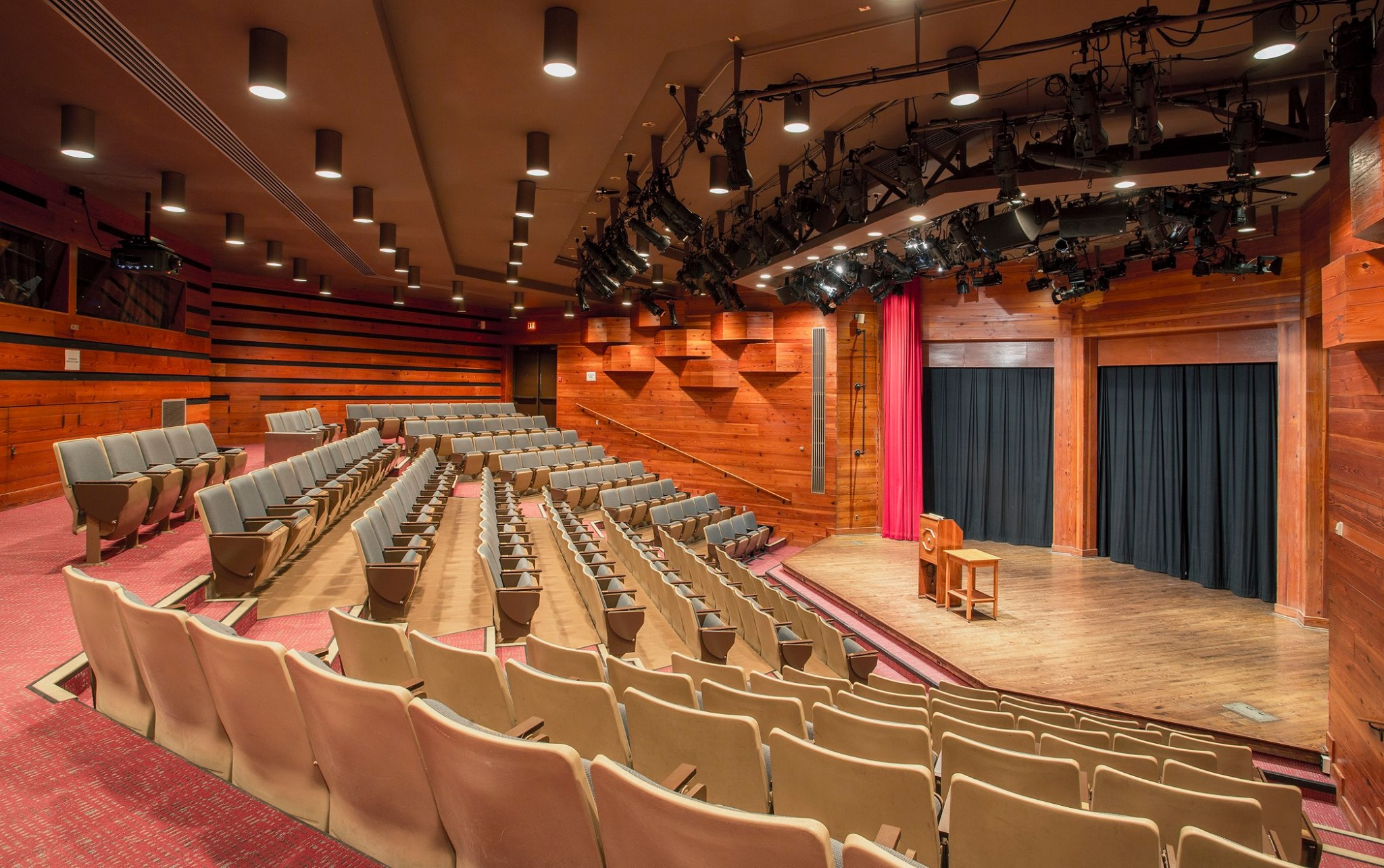
George Ignatieff Theatre

Trinity College suffered from a spate of negative media stories across the 1990s. In 1991 students began campaigning against Episkopon, a long-standing Trinity student society. Episkopon was founded in 1858 with the objective of providing "gentle chastisement" to errant members of the university. By the 1980s, some students began accusing the society of singling out students for racist, sexist, and homophobic attacks. This campaign attracted considerable press, and a statement of support from Marion Boyd, Ontario's Minister for the Status of Women. In fall 1991, an outspoken student critic of Episkopon was doused in a bucket of urine and feces in what was reported as an act of retribution. In 1992, the College Council voted to dissociate Trinity from Episkopon, denying it student funds, official status, and the use of university property.

In 1996, Trinity's Dean of Divinity David Holeton resigned his position after admitting to multiple claims of sexual abuse. Three years later, newspapers reported that Episkopon had returned to holding events, now simply off Trinity grounds. Trinity College has not corroborated or refuted the allegations that some of the purported victims were above or below the age of consent at the time of the abuse.

The turn of the century brought substantial changes to Trinity College. In 2005, Provost Margaret MacMillan, a famed historian and herself a Trinity graduate, ended the practice of gender-segregated residences. Whereas previously all women lived in St. Hilda's College and all men in the main Trinity building, under MacMillan co-education came to both buildings, with individual floors being designated single-sex.

== Buildings and environs ==
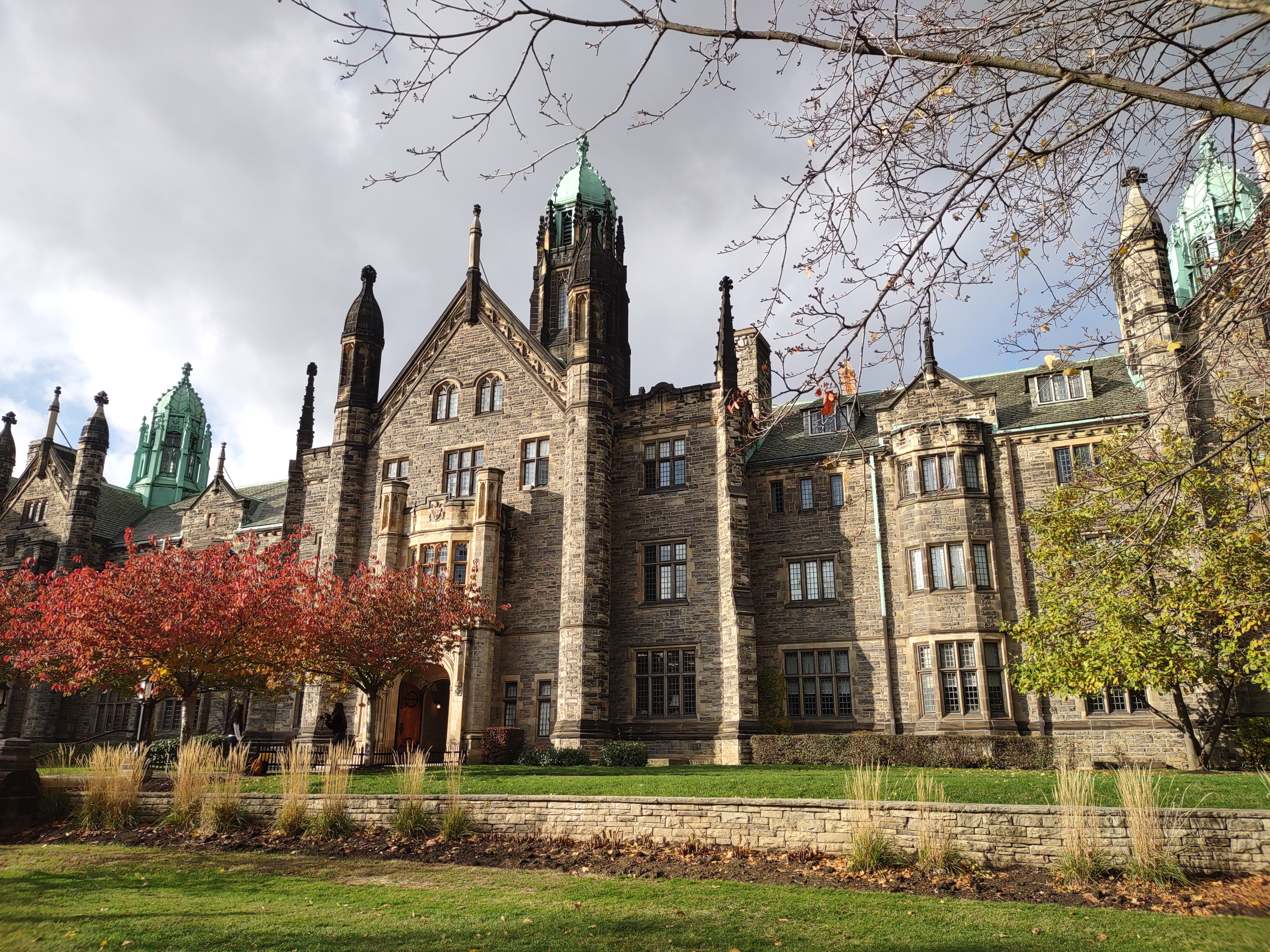
Trinity from Hoskin Avenue

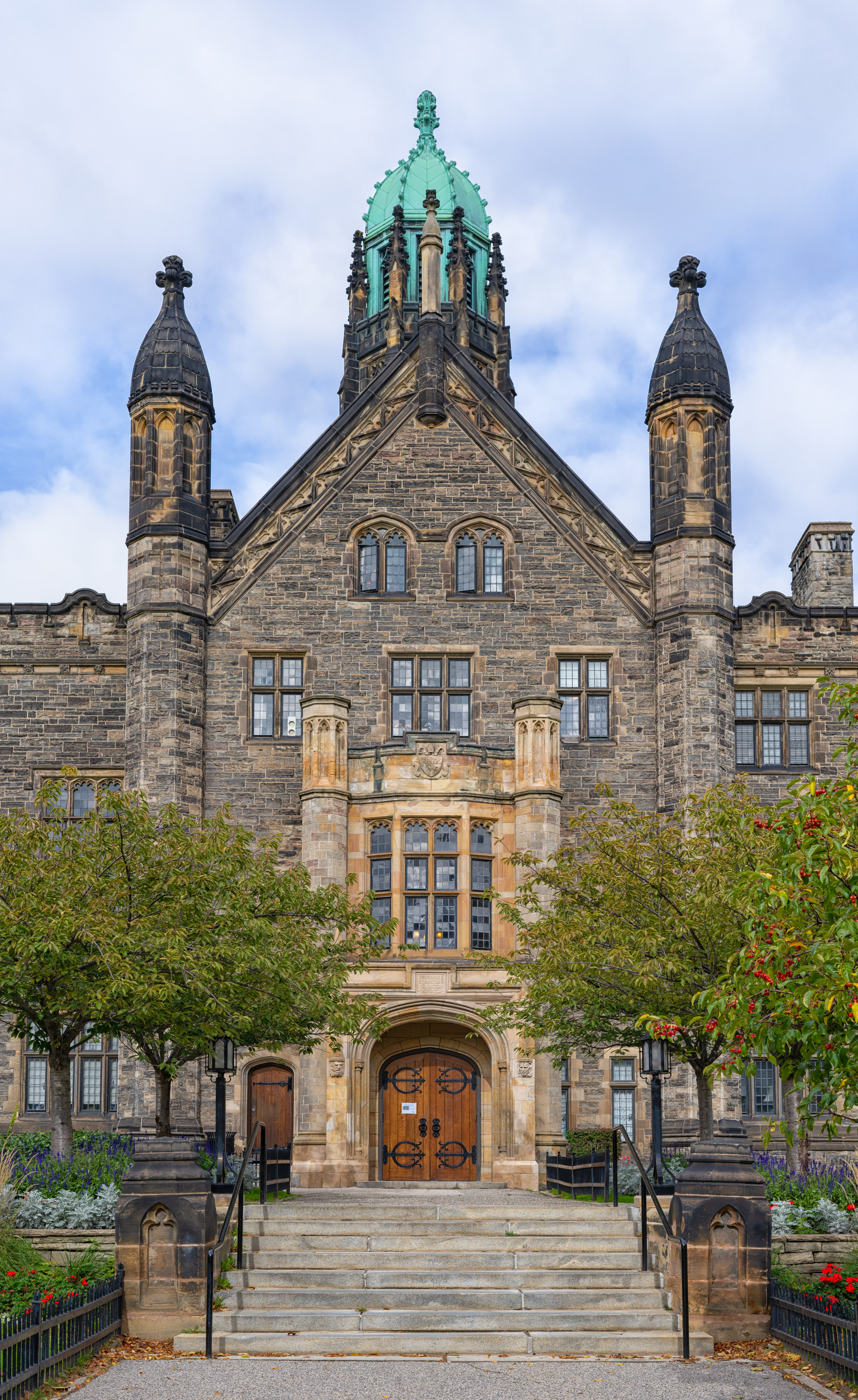
Front wing of Trinity College

Trinity College is today located on Hoskin Avenue within the University of Toronto's St. George campus, directly north of Wycliffe College. The primary College grounds are bounded to the North by Varsity Stadium, and to the west by Devonshire House (owned by Trinity College but mostly leased to the Munk School of Global Affairs and Public Policy). Directly to its east, the university overlooks Philosopher’s Walk with the University of Toronto's Henry N.R. Jackman Faculty of Law on the opposite side of the ravine.

=== Trinity proper ===
==== South wing ====
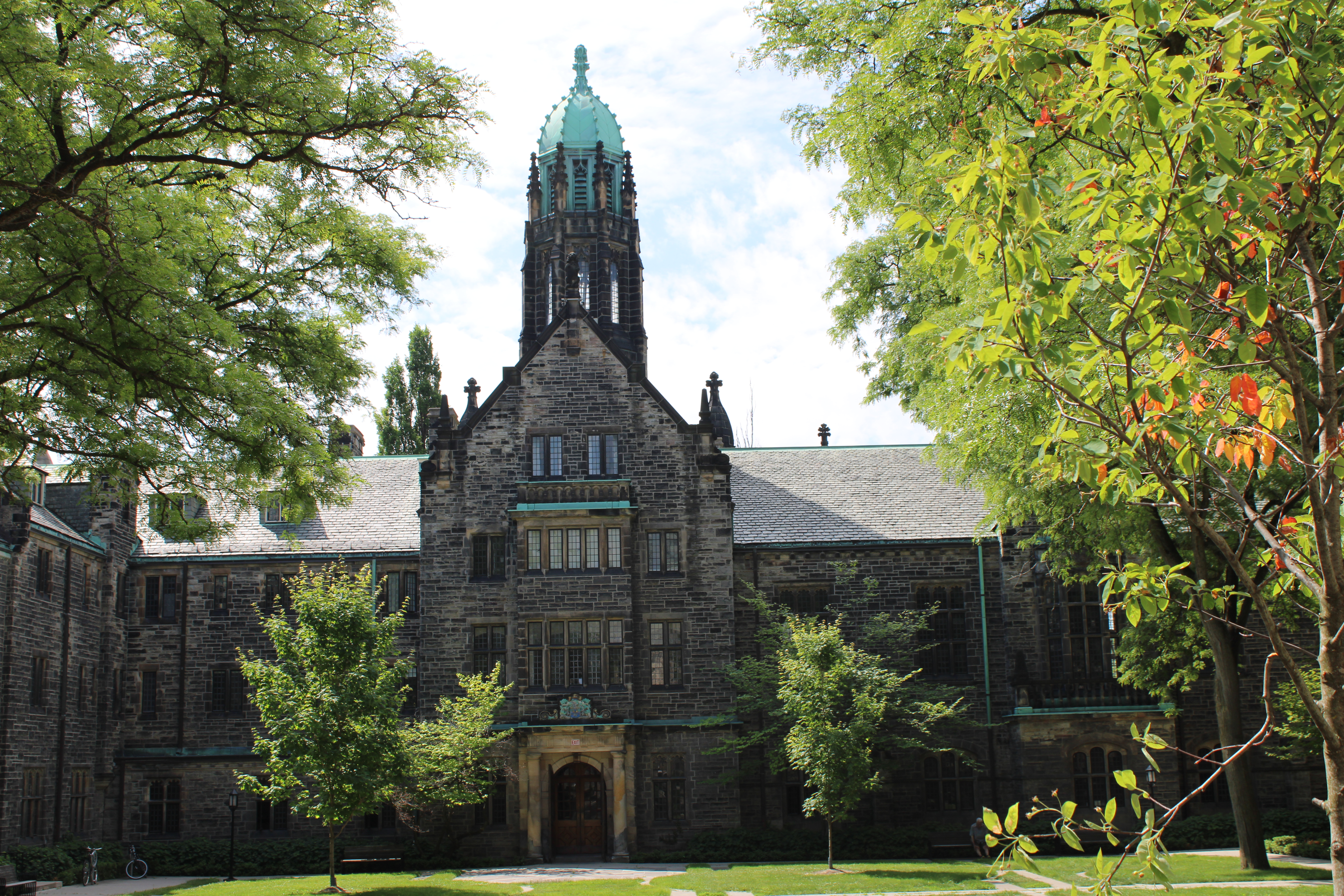
Trinity's central tower from the quad

The front wing of the main building (often referred to as "Trinity Proper") was completed in 1925 by architectural firm Darling and Pearson, among whose other projects include the university's Convocation Hall and Varsity Arena. The architects were required to faithfully preserve the familiar characteristics of the original Trinity College building by Kivas Tully in the design of the front wing, which is hence of predominantly Jacobethan architectural construction. This is particularly apparent in the characteristic roofline and stone towers of the building, while Tudor Revival styles are employed in the construction of the Angel's Roost tower in the university's west wing. Prominent faces are carved into the doorposts at the entrance to the university, the entrance to Strachan Hall, as well as the gate under the east wing's Henderson Tower. The door from the entrance hall into the Trinity quadrangle is also carved with the signs of the zodiac, while figures of scholars adorn the hallway.

By 1941, immediately prior to the imposition of wartime restrictions on building materials, Trinity College had undertaken the construction of the eastern and western wings under Toronto architectural firm George & Moorhouse. The western wing provides an academic wing containing many of the university's public rooms and services, including Strachan Hall, while the eastern wing comprises expanded residence space for the burgeoning university.

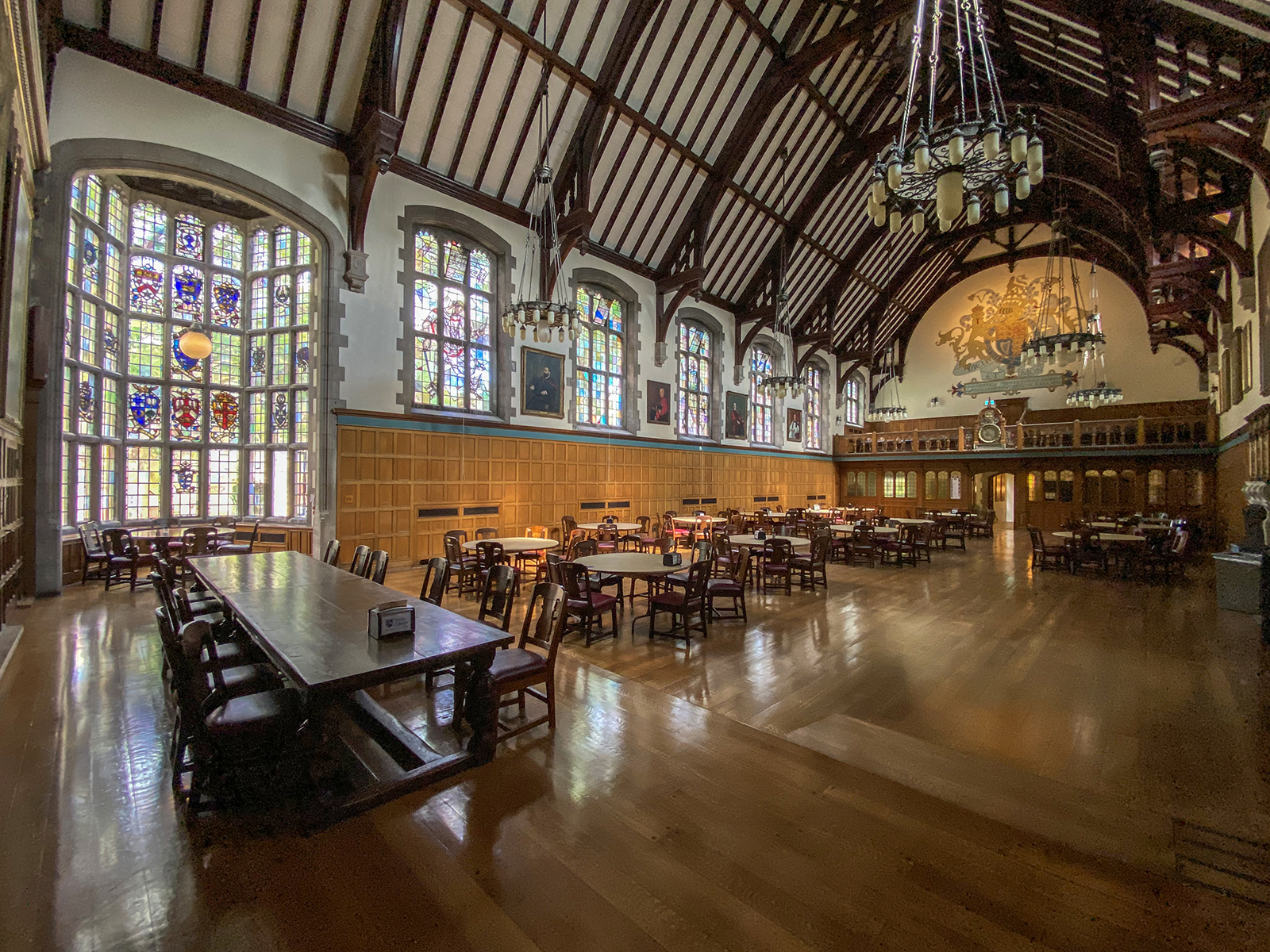
Strachan Hall

==== Dining hall ====
The largest component of the western wing, as well as the central dining hall and social space for students residing at Trinity College, Strachan Hall was built in elaborate wood and stone with the intention of matching the aesthetics of the existing university. It is replete with decorations intended to extol the history and values of the university, with heraldric artist A. Scott Carter commissioned to execute paintings and carvings of the coats of arms belonging to founder John Strachan, Queen Victoria, St Hilda's College, the Trinity Medical College, Provost Cosgrave, and Gerald Larkin. Adorning the walls of the Strachan Hall are portraits of the College Provosts, the founder John Strachan, and Sir John Beverley Robinson – Chief Justice of Upper Canada and the university's first chancellor. The largest portraits, which hang from the north wall, are of Bishop Strachan and George Whitaker, the university's first provost from 1852 to 1880. Hanging on the front wall prominently behind the High Table is a large medieval tapestry provenant of Gerald Larkin's enthusiastic patronage, believed to have been woven in Flanders in the sixteenth century to depict the coming of the Queen of Sheba to the court of King Solomon.

==== Junior Common Room ====
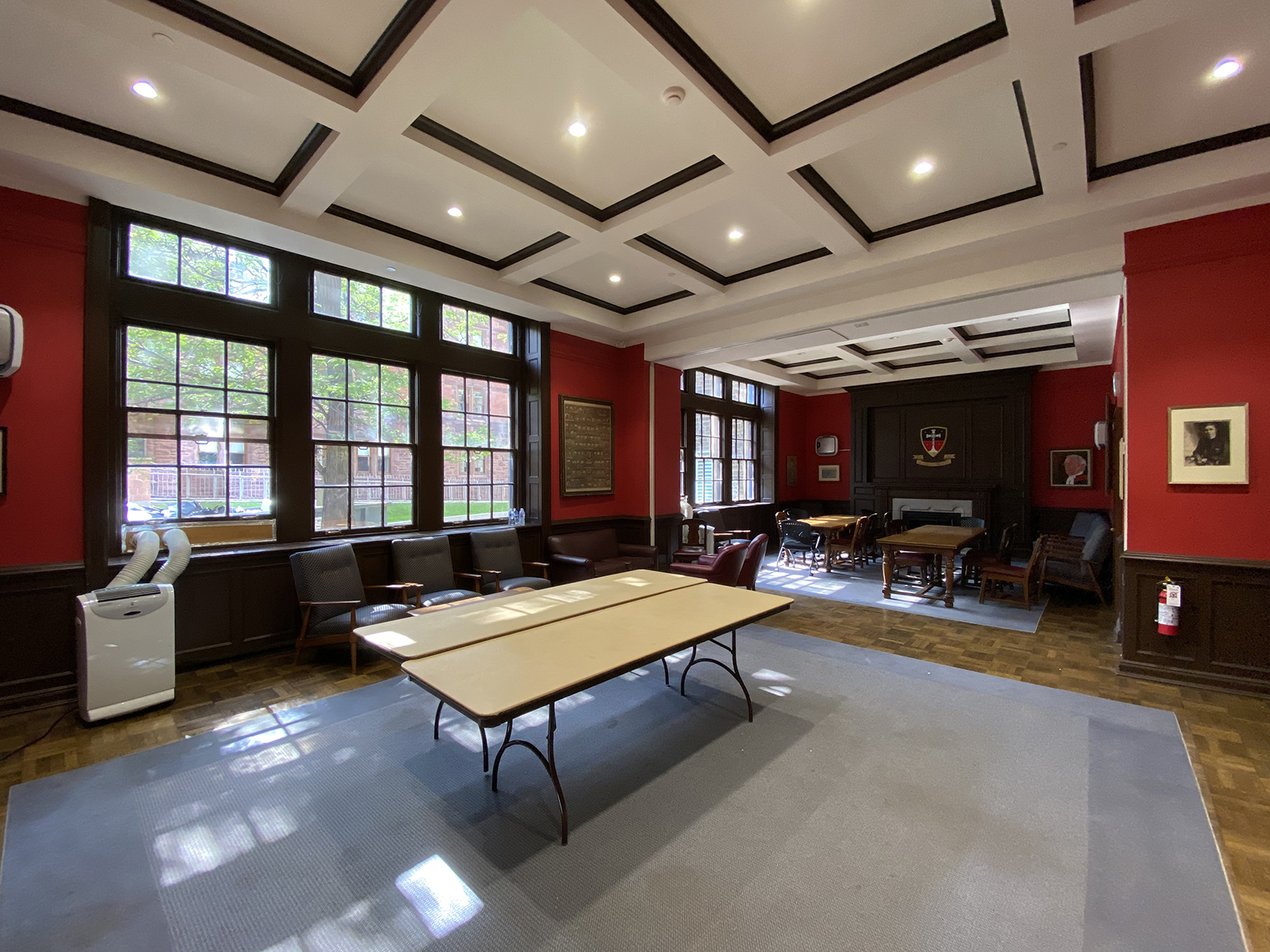
Divinity Common Room

Situated in the western wing not far from Strachan Hall, the Junior Common Room (JCR) is used extensively by Trinity College's student organisations as a social and event space. It most prominently houses the Trinity College Literary Institute, whose coat of arms adorns the mantle. A portrait of C. Allan Ashley, professor of commerce at the University of Toronto, and a long-time resident of Trinity College, hangs to the right of the door.

==== Chapel ====
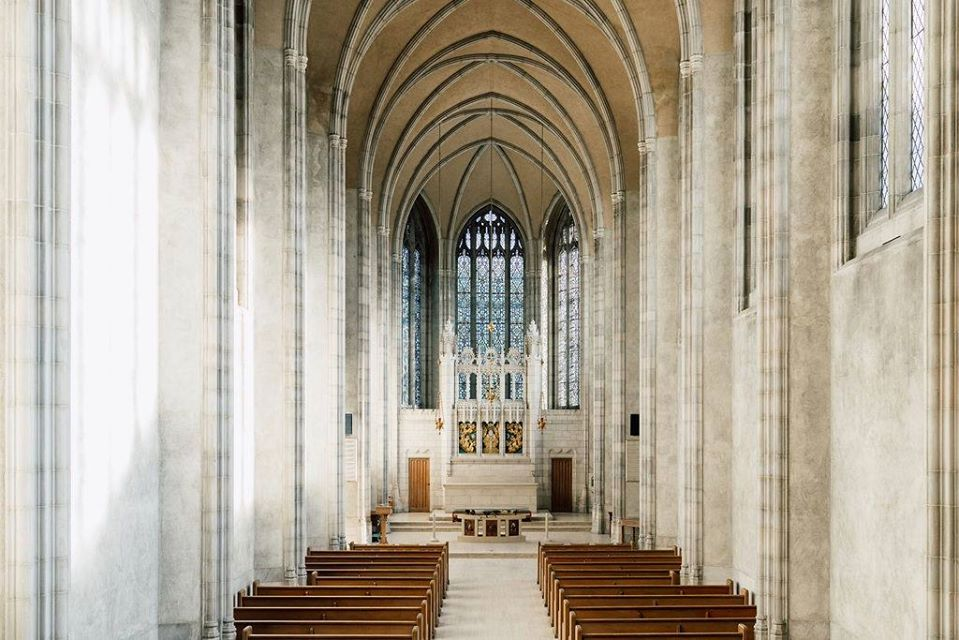
Trinity College's chapel

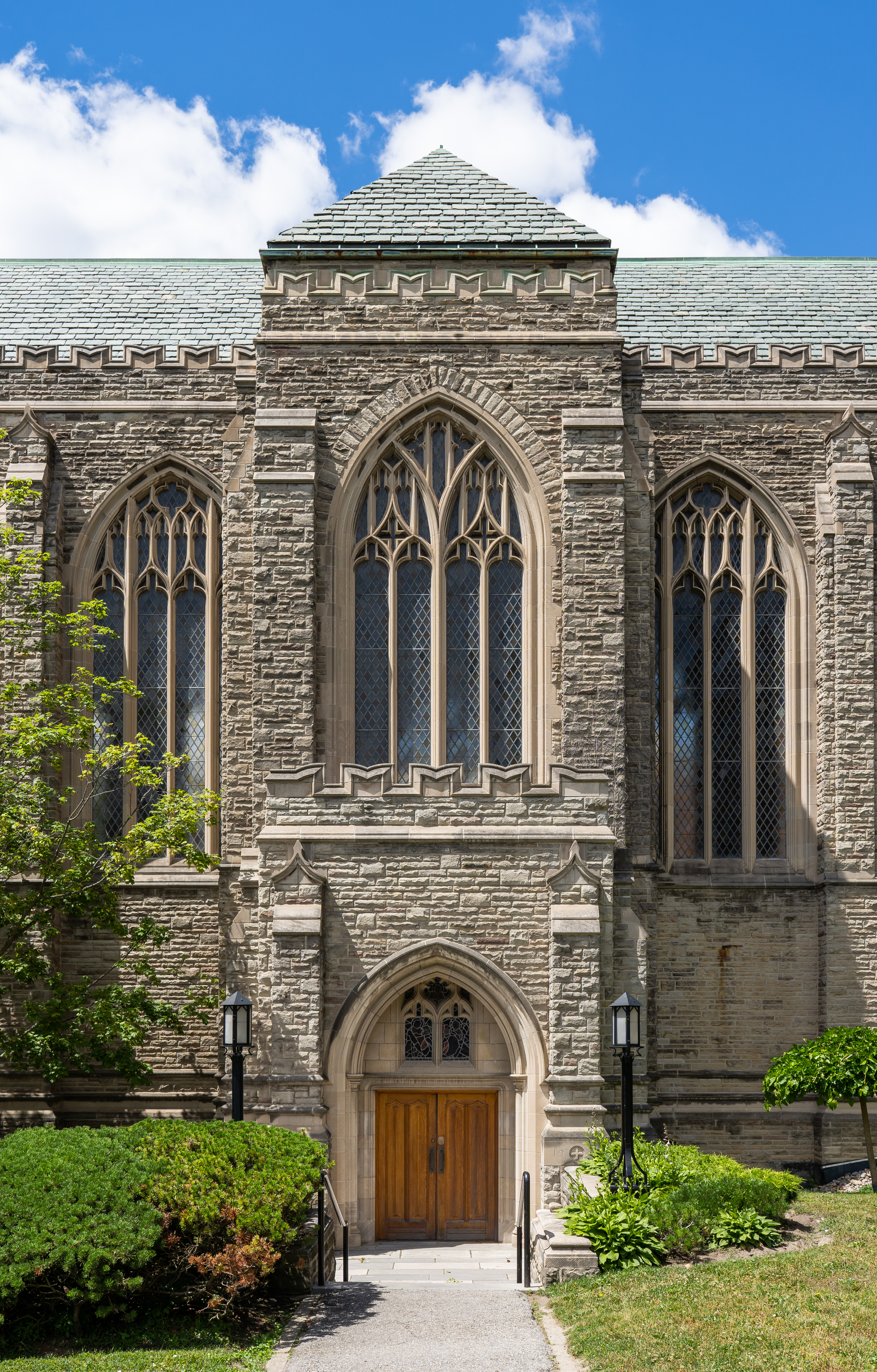
Entrance to Trinity College's chapel

The Trinity College Chapel was built with funds donated by Gerald Larkin, head of the Salada Tea Company from 1922 to 1957. It was designed in the modified perpendicular Gothic style by renowned English architect Giles Gilbert Scott, who was also responsible for the Liverpool Cathedral and the ubiquitous red telephone boxes seen throughout Britain. The chapel extends 100 feet (30 m) to the reredos and is 47 feet (14 m) high at the vault bosses. Using only stone, brick, and cement, Italian stonemasons employed ancient building methods; the only steel in the construction is in the hidden girders supporting the slate roof, with the exterior walls being sandstone. The Chapel contains several architectural sculptures, including a tympanum by Emmanuel Hahn as well as a carved lintel and tympanum by Jacobine Jones, who also carved the wooden angels on the baptistry. The Lady Chapel's altar was preserved from the original Queen Street location chapel, while the matching sedilia was donated by Robertson Davies' widow in his memory. In the chapel a memorial tablet in Indiana limestone designed by Allan George, with lettering and medallions by A. Scott Carter, is dedicated to the members of Trinity College who gave their lives in the First and Second World Wars. A number of bronze memorial plaques also honour alumni who died during the First World War. On the wall outside the entrance to the chapel, a memorial Triptych illuminated manuscript in three frames is an Honour Roll erected by Trinity College in 1942 dedicated to the approximately 1000 men and women of Trinity College who died while serving their country; Canadian artist Jack McNie completed the lettering by hand.

==== Quadrangle ====
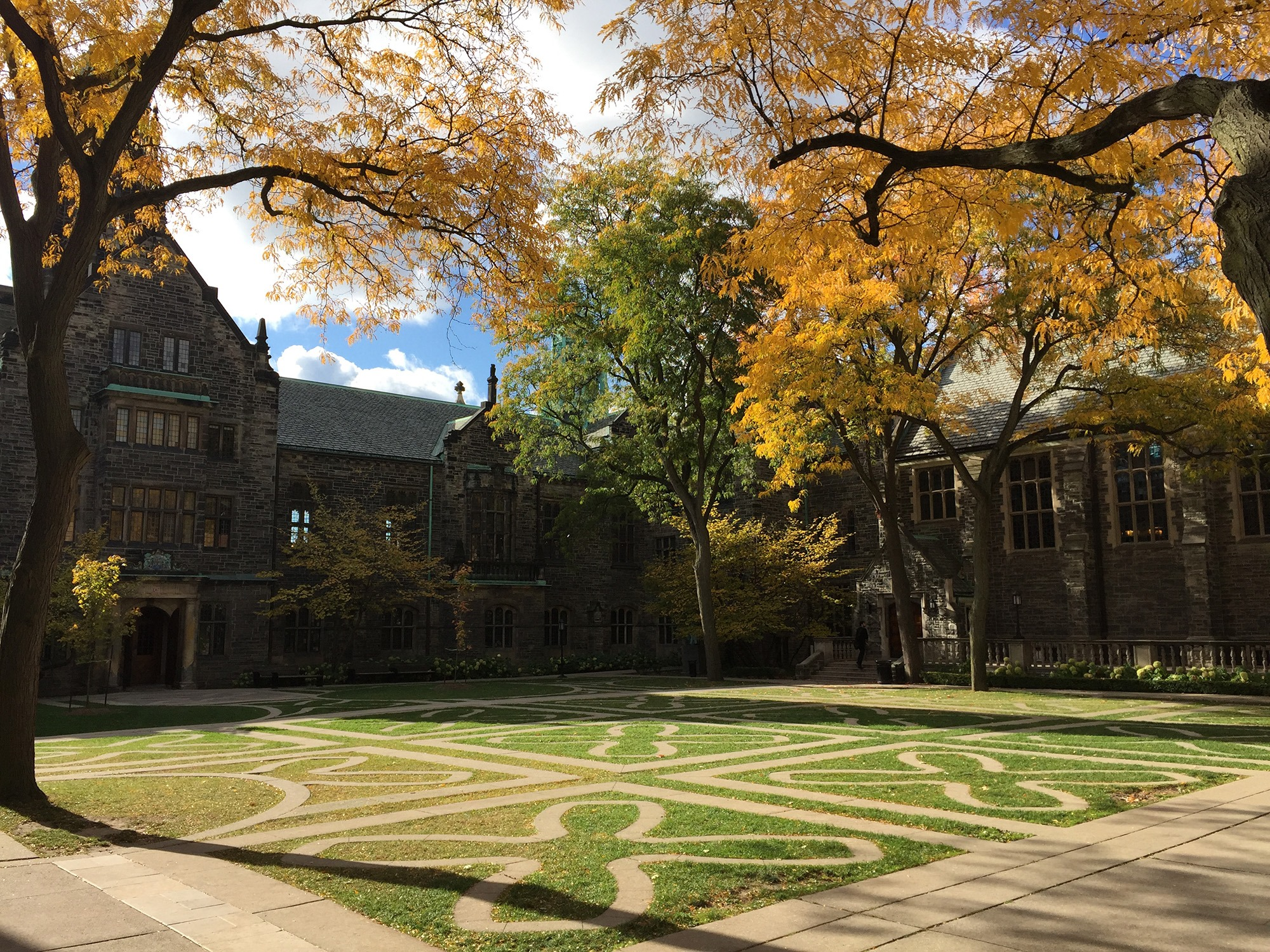
Trinity College's quadrangle

The university's northern wing was completed by architects Somerville, McMurrich and Oxley in 1963, thereby completely enclosing the university quadrangle. The Trinity quadrangle has long been a focal point of student life at the university. The site is home to Shakespeare in the Quad, an annual tradition dated to 1949 famed for its of hosting of open-air Shakespeare performances and artistic exhibits. The quadrangle design features footpaths and patterns based on the Greek letter Chi, representing Christ, writ large and intricate flagstones. It was outfitted with a sundial until the quadrangle's renovation in the summer of 2007.

=== St. Hilda's College ===
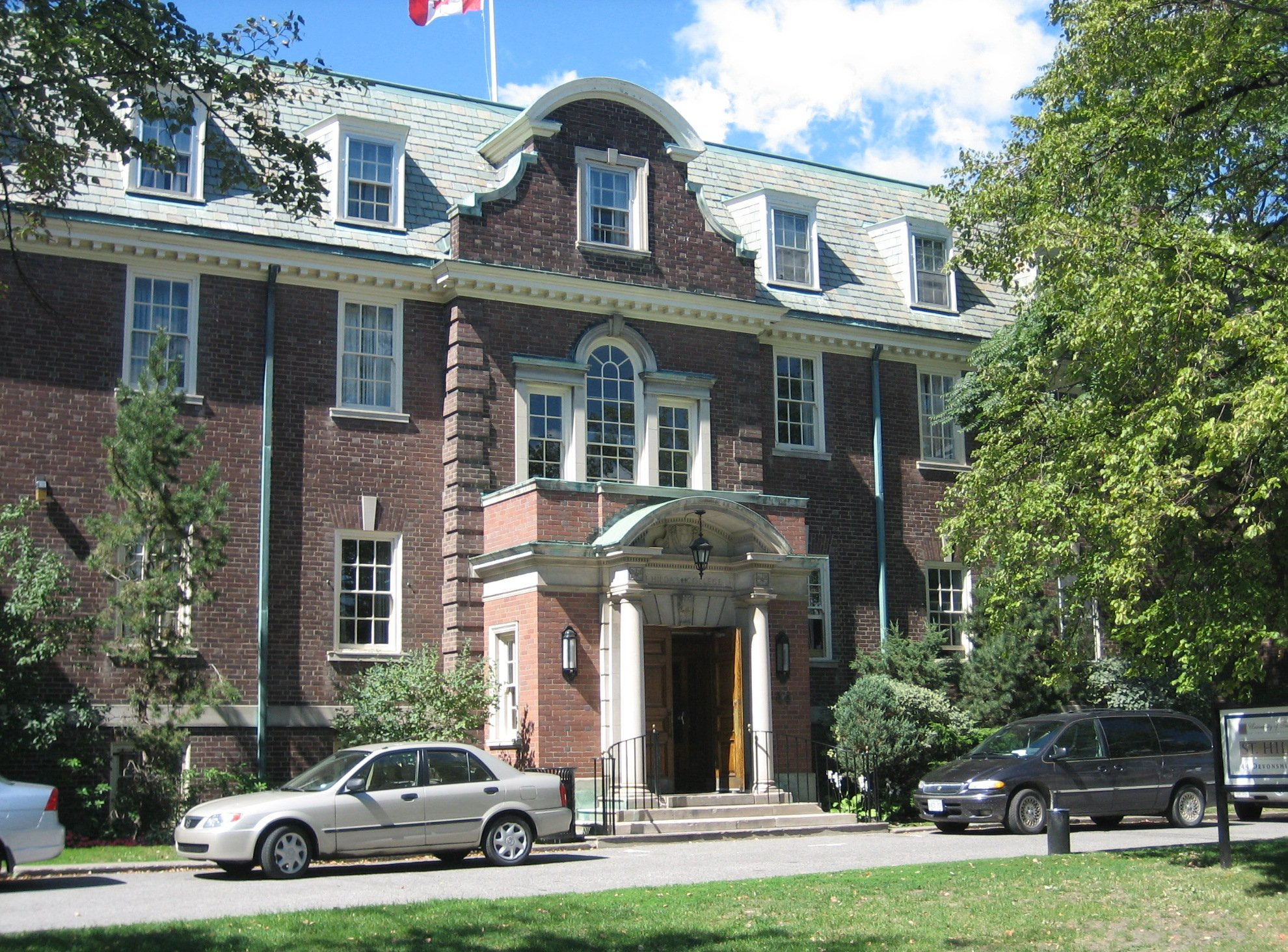
St. Hilda's College, overseen by architects George & Moorhouse

St. Hilda's College, the Trinity College's second residential building and historically the university's female counterpart, was constructed in 1938. Prior to its completion, the women of the university resided in three converted homes on St. George Street. Architects George and Moorhouse had built St. Hilda's College in the Georgian style popular at the time at the time, paying particular emphasis to the provision of domestic facilities and spaces to provide a "home-like influence" for young women then expected to adopt traditionally feminine roles and virtues. Originally envisioned as a complementary but separate institution, St. Hilda's only briefly had its own classes, but it retained a separate administrative and social existence until the 21st century. In 2004 St. Hilda's was converted into a mixed residential space inclusive of all students of the university. North and south wings were added later to the building, and in 2010 the university undertook the installation of a green roof.

=== Library ===
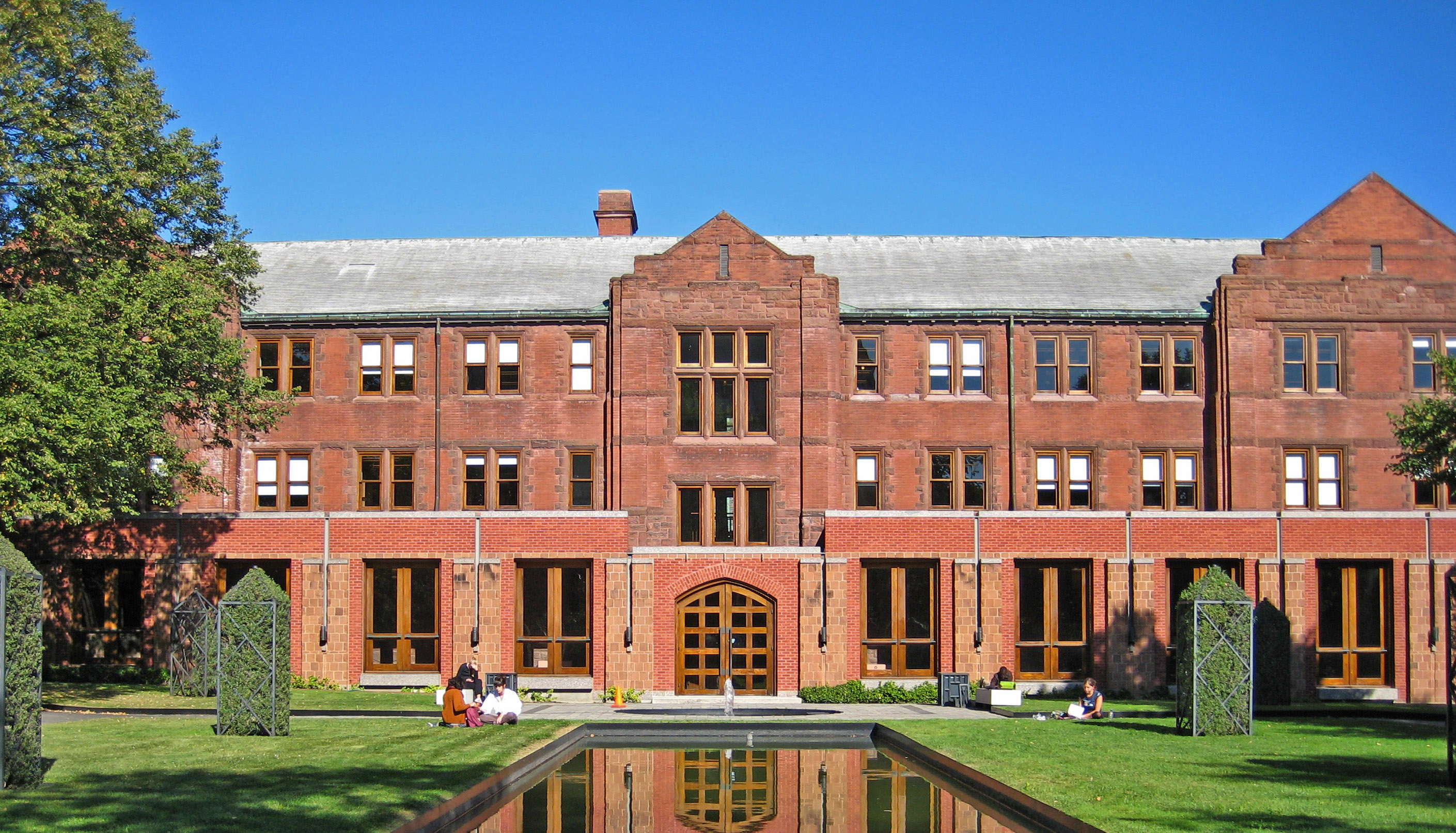
Trinity's John W. Graham Library

Trinity's John W. Graham Library traces its origins to 1828, when John Strachan secured a collection of some four hundred books from the Society for Promoting Christian Knowledge to stock the library of the fledgling King's College. When Trinity moved to its present-day location on Hoskin Avenue, the library was initially housed in the basement of the main building. In 2000, the library moved into the east wing of the Devonshire House, a heritage building purpose-renovated for the library, alongside the Munk School of Global Affairs and Public Policy. The same year Wycliffe College's theological collection merged with the Trinity library, which was renamed after Toronto lawyer and Anglican churchman John W. Graham (also father of Canadian entrepreneur Ted Rogers).

Trinity's library contains some 200,000 volumes, computing resources, and approximately 200 study spaces. The library primarily serves Trinity's undergraduate students in the Faculty of Arts and Science and the graduate Divinity students and faculty of Trinity and Wycliffe colleges, as well as the Munk School and Anglican Church communities. Subject strengths reflect Trinity's academic programs and interests: international relations, ethics, English literature, philosophy, theology, Anglican church history, and biblical studies. All Trinity students also have access to the other libraries of the University of Toronto Libraries system.

The Trinity College Friends of the Library promotes the expansion and well-being of the Graham Library. Each year, the Friends put on a book sale in Trinity's Seeley Hall, selling a wide range of subjects at affordable prices, as well as old and rare books. The book sale attracts visitors from across the continent, and is considered one of Toronto's best. The book sale routinely raises over $100,000 for the library.

=== Gerald Larkin Building ===
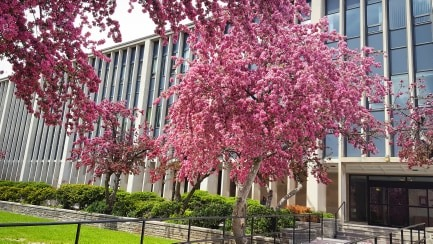
The Gerald Larkin Building

The Gerald Larkin Building opened in 1962, while the George Ignatieff Theatre, named for then-provost George Ignatieff, was added to the northwest corner of the Larkin Building in 1979. The Larkin Building is home to the university's Centre for Ethics, as well as several classrooms and offices. The ground floor is dominated by "The Buttery," a student lounge space that previously served as a cafe. In the basement, there is an abandoned, yet perfectly preserved language lab from the 1960s.

Gerald Larkin was President of the Salada Tea Company, and one of Trinity's most generous benefactors. The university's dining hall and chapel were made possible through his donations. Larkin bequeathed Trinity almost $4 million in his will, which the university used to construct the building bearing his name.

=== Lawson Centre For Sustainability ===
In 2018, Trinity College announced the construction of a new building, the Lawson Centre for Sustainability. The building opened in September 2026, adding 155,000 square feet of mixed-used facilities, including 357 new residence beds, seminar and lecture rooms, community spaces, and a new dining facility called Trinity Café. Trinity Café is set to replace Strachan Hall as the university's primary dining facility; Strachan Hall will serve as a secondary dining facility with reduced hours.

The Lawson Centre, zero-carbon and LEED Platinum certified, will serve as a focal point for the university's new Integrated Sustainability Initiative, which aims to incorporate sustainable practices into academic and student life, with new spaces including the Kitchen Lab, the George and Martha Butterfield Rooftop Farm, and the University of Toronto’s Lawson Climate Institute.

== Academics ==
Trinity consists of an undergraduate Faculty of Arts which is part of the University of Toronto Faculty of Arts and Science, and a postgraduate Faculty of Divinity that is part of the Toronto School of Theology. Undergraduate students are admitted to Trinity in line with a common framework established by the University of Toronto, which sets the general principles and procedures for admission observed by its colleges. Applicants to Trinity are required to place the university first when ranking their preferences in colleges, and must additionally complete a supplemental application. The university has the fewest undergraduate students among the university's colleges, and limits first-year enrolment limited to about 450 students. In 2018, Trinity's first-year class had an entrance average of 94.6 per cent.

=== Unique programs ===
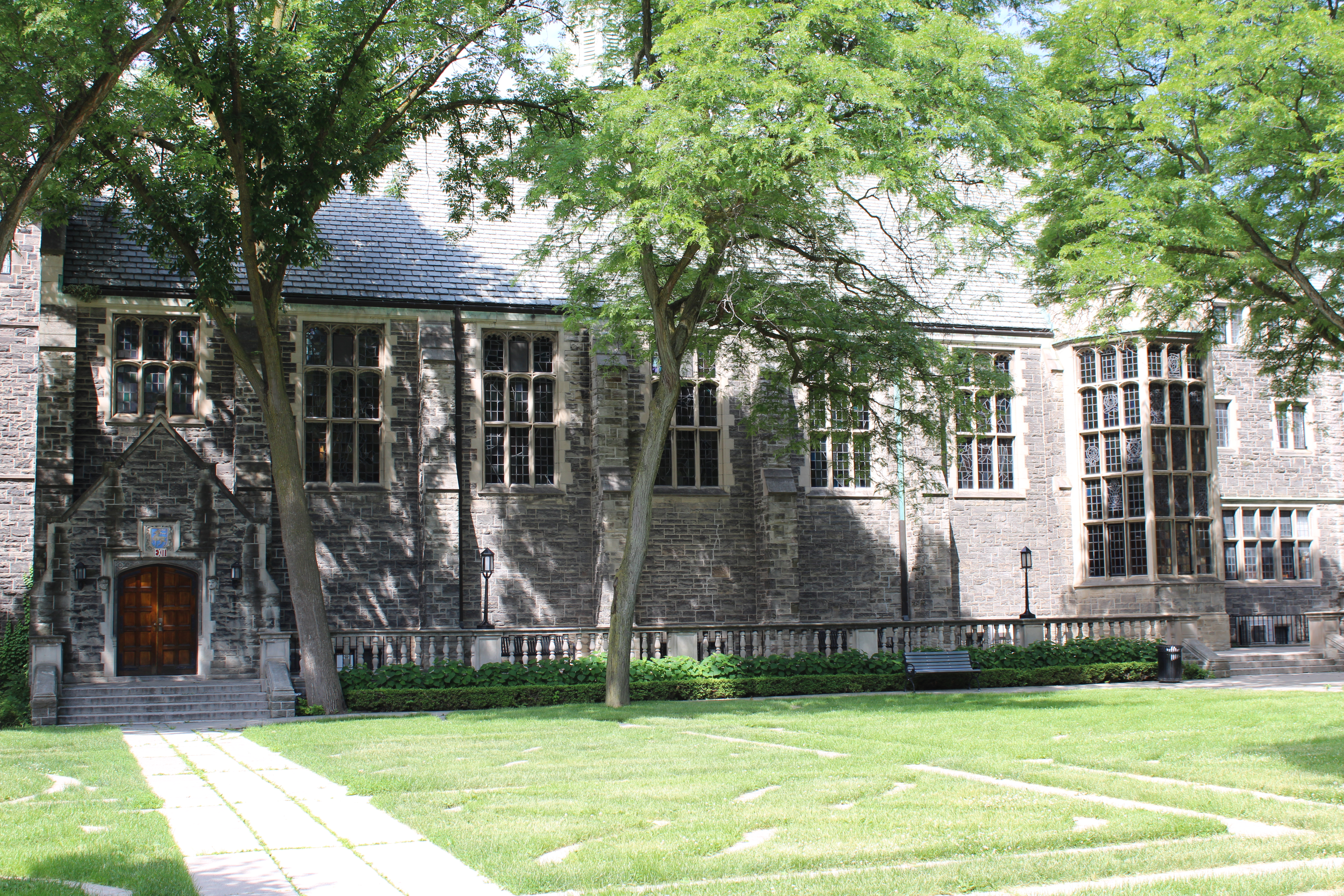
Strachan Hall

Trinity College offers undergraduate programs in immunology, international relations, and ethics, society, and law. The university also hosts first year seminar courses within the "Margaret MacMillan Trinity One Program", named after former Trinity Provost Margaret MacMillan. Admission to the Trinity One program is open to all students at the University of Toronto, but requires a supplemental application. There are six Trinity One streams, each capped at 20-25 students: Policy, Philosophy & Economics; Ethics, Society & Law; International Relations; Biomedical Health; Environmental Sustainability; and Medicine & Global Health.

Trinity's undergraduate programs benefits from the presence of the Munk School of Global Affairs and Public Policy, which is housed in Devonshire House on Trinity grounds. Many Trinity faculty members have offices in the Munk School. The Munk School also houses specialized research centres, such as the Asian Institute and the Centre for European, Russian, and Eurasian Studies. The Munk School and its associated institutes host frequent lectures, panels, and events which are open to the Trinity community.

=== Faculty of Divinity ===
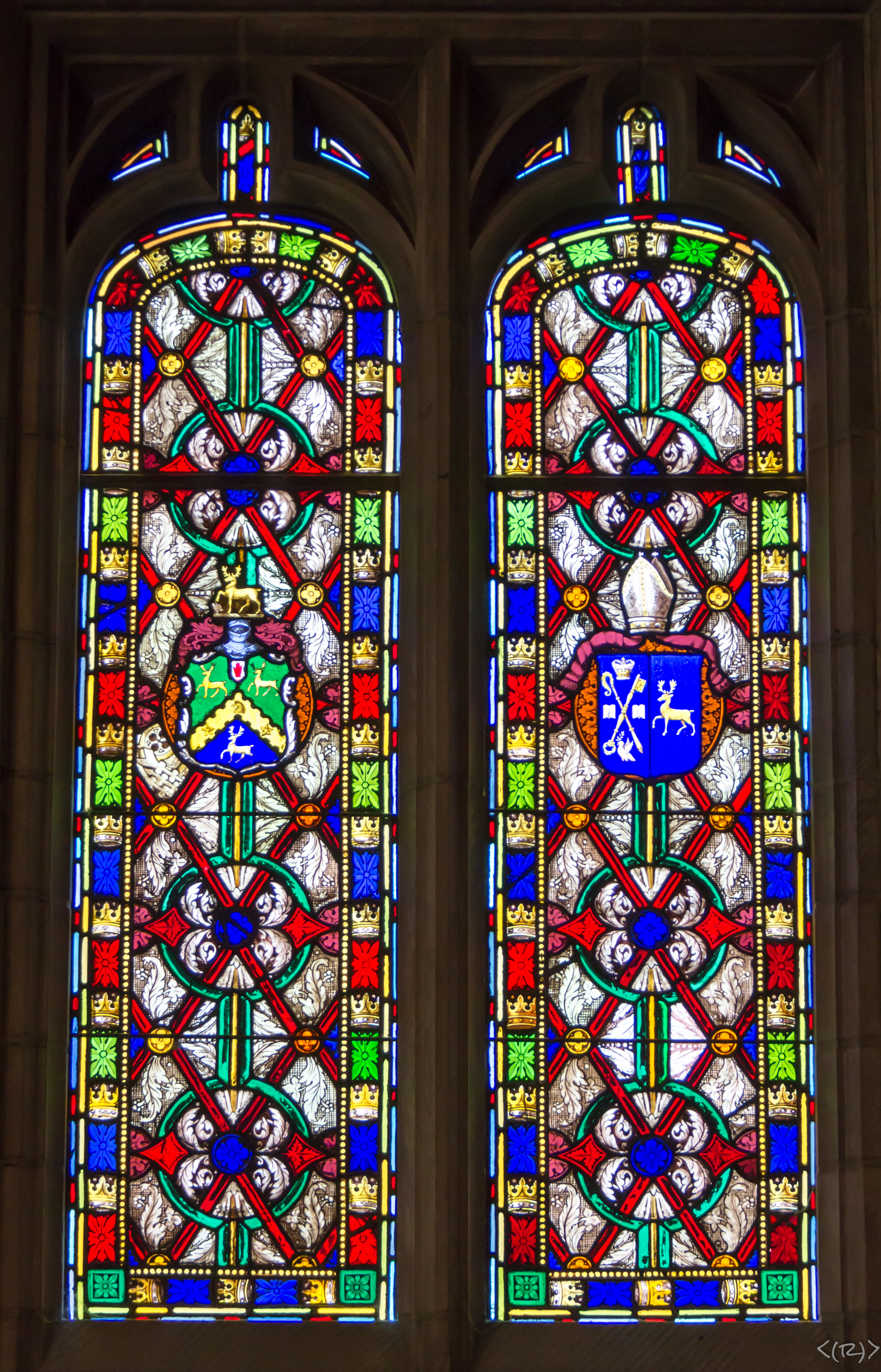
Stained glass in the Trinity College chapel

Beginning in 1837, representatives of the United Church of England and Ireland in Upper Canada met with the Society for Propagation of the Gospel to solicit support for fellowships to enable the education of local clergy. With a guarantee of support, in 1841 Bishop Strachan requested his chaplains, Henry James Grasett and Henry Scadding of St. James' Cathedral, and Alexander Neil Bethune, then Rector of Cobourg, to prepare a plan for a systematic course in theology for those to be admitted to Holy Orders. On January 10, 1842, the first lecture was given at the Diocesan Theological Institute in Cobourg. In 1852, teaching was transferred to Toronto in the new Faculty of Divinity at Trinity College. Trinity College absorbed the Diocesan Theological Institute in Cobourg in 1852.

The Anglican seminary remains active in college life, with approximately a dozen worship services held weekly in the chapel. In recent years, the Orthodox School of Theology has also begun using the chapel for weekly services.

The approximately 100 graduate students enrolled in Trinity's Faculty of Divinity may take courses at other colleges at the Toronto School of Theology. At the basic degree level, Trinity offers several Master of Divinity programs - a basic program, a "collaborative learning" model with self-directed study components, and an honours programme, which includes a thesis. For students not seeking Holy Orders, a Master of Theological Studies is offered, as well as a Certificate in Theological Studies. At the advanced degree level, students may pursue the Master of Arts in Theology, the Master of Theology, the Doctor of Theology and the Doctor of Ministry. Applicants to the Ph.D. must hold an M.Div. Students can also enroll jointly in the M.Div. and MA.

In 2006, the Faculty of Divinity began offering an Orthodox and Eastern Christian Studies program. In 2015, this program developed into the Orthodox School of Theology, which offers courses on Eastern Orthodoxy within the Masters of Divinity program.

The Trinity College Faculty of Divinity is accredited by the Association of Theological Schools, and publishes a statement of educational effectiveness. Trinity College is the only college or university in Canada accredited to offer Orthodox theological education.

The Faculty of Divinity's Arms and Badge are registered with the Canadian Heraldic Authority.

== Student life ==
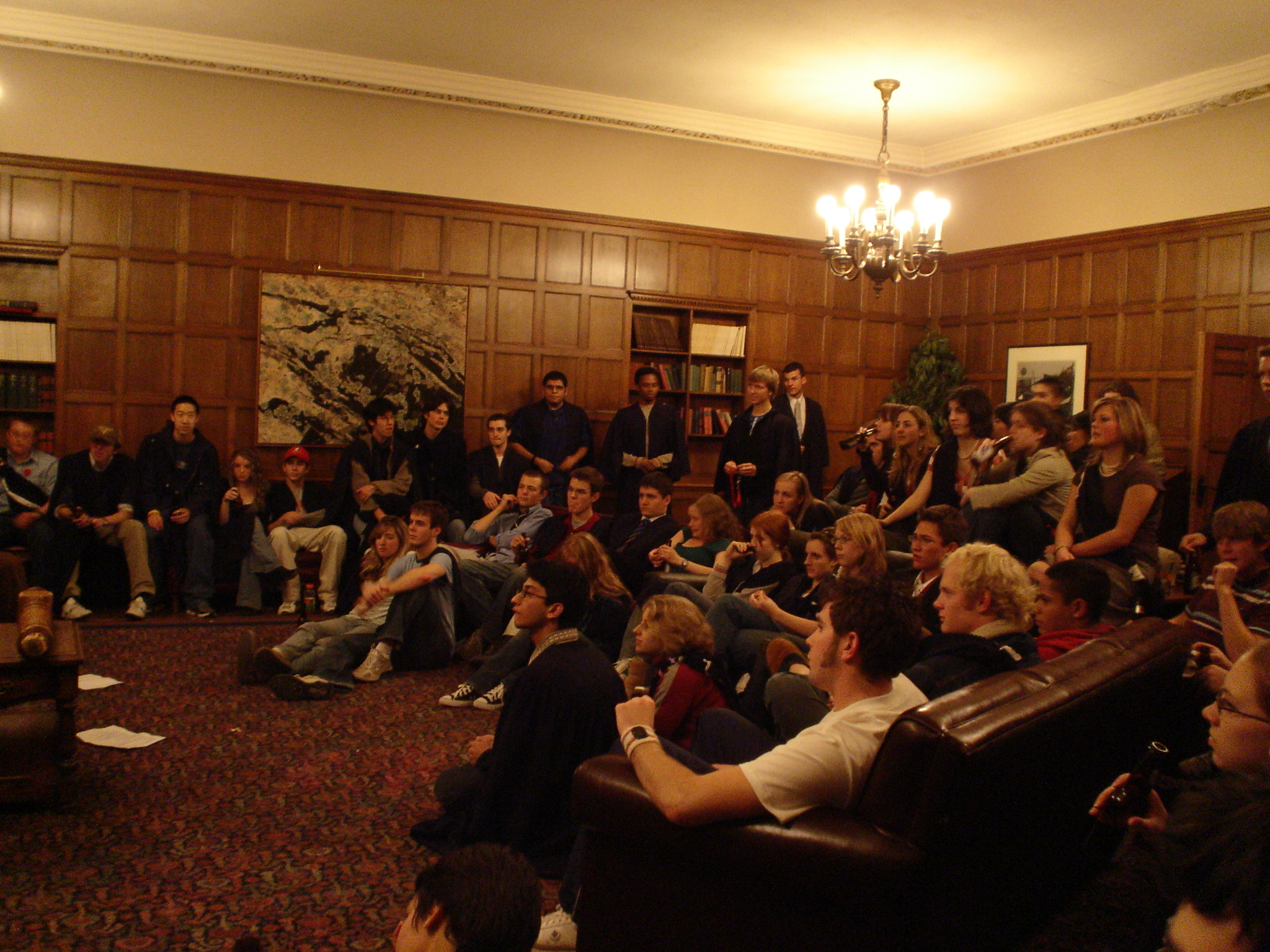
Attendance at a Lit debate

Trinity College enjoys a rich student life, with multiple university events held on a weekly basis. Trinity students maintain a diverse range of clubs and societies, and celebrate numerous traditions. The university hosts two black tie balls annually, and continue to celebrate British holidays including Guy Fawkes and Robbie Burns Days.

=== Literary Institute ===
The Trinity College Literary Institute (colloquially, "the Lit") is a satirical debating society. The Lit is a successor body to the Diocesan Theological Institute's Debating Society, thus technically pre-dating Trinity College itself. The Lit claims to be the oldest debating society in Canada but the claim is contested by the Queen's Debating Union. In its early decades, the Lit debated issues of serious important to university life, such as compulsory chapel attendance and Sunday street cars. The tone of the debates shifted starting around the end of World War I; today, a typical meeting of the Lit usually includes satirical debates on a humorous topic, updates on university news, and satirical poetry from the Poet Laureate. While the meetings are typically crass student affairs, sitting faculty, distinguished alumni and even Provosts have been known to attend and debate on occasion. Beyond weekly meetings, the Lit organizes other events, historically including the annual Guy Fawkes bonfire, Oktoberfest, Chess in the Quad, Robbie Burns and "Bubbly"—a champagne themed formal ball. The institute's executive is modeled after Canadian parliament, and consists of a Prime Minister, Speaker, Opposition Leader, and Deputy Speaker. Lists of former Speakers and Prime Ministers going back over a century are prominently displayed in the east hall between the chapel and Strachan Hall.

=== Student government ===
The Trinity College Meeting (TCM) the final student government authority at Trinity College. A direct democracy body in which all college students have equal standing (conditional on the wearing of gowns at meetings), the TCM directly governs major policy questions and the allocation of student funds, and convenes a series of committees to provide recommendations on all aspects of student life. The TCM delegates responsibility for daily affairs to six student Heads, following annual elections. There are two Heads of College, two Heads of Arts (social), two Heads of Non-Residents and one to two Head(s) of Divinity. Historically, one Head was female and the other male; as of 2021, Heads positions have been degendered. Students of the Faculty of Divinity additionally elect one or two Heads each year, although they do not serve as officers of the TCM.

=== Balls ===
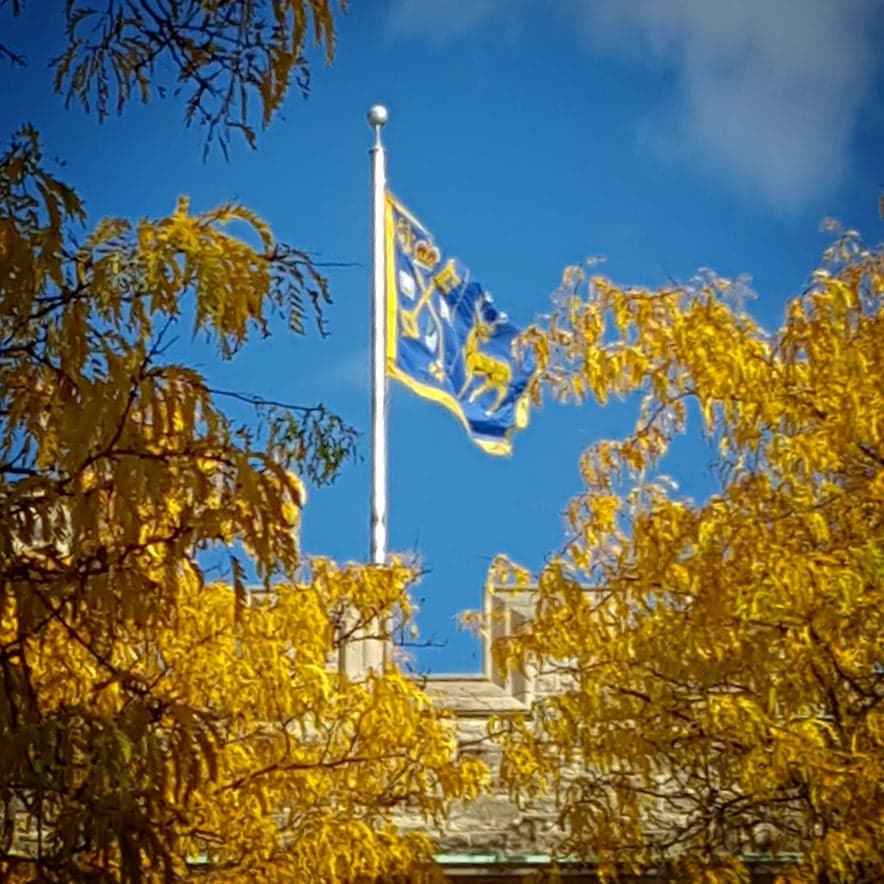
Trinity's flag flying above Henderson Tower

Formal dances are held twice annually at Trinity. The Saints Ball is held annually in the fall semester around November at St. Hilda's College, and the Conversazione ("Conversat") ball is held at Trinity College in the winter semester. Traditionally, the Saints Ball was hosted by women of college in their residence Sadie Hawkins style, where the women reversed traditional gender roles by asking men to be their dates. Conversat was hosted by men of college in theirs, and historically organized by a committee of the Literary Institute. The first recorded Conversat occurred in 1869, but it was not until 1883 that the event became associated with dancing. Conversat has been held annually since 1869, and has become a key part of social life at Trinity. The ball used to be a central component of Toronto social life, and attracted dignitaries from across the province. The Governor General Lord Stanley attended the 1891 Conversat. In recent years, the growing size of the student body has necessitated moving the balls to off-campus venues. While the residences have been desegregated since 2005, the tradition loosely remains that the women of college ask their date to Saints, and the men ask their date to Conversat.

=== Student Publications ===
Trinity students publish a magazine called Salterrae (Latin, meaning The Salt of the Earth) which was founded as Trinsight in 1981. The annual yearbook is Stephanos (Greek, meaning Crown). There is also a bi-annual journal of students' short stories, photographs and poetry, called the Trinity University Review; it was first published in 1880 as Rouge et Noir (French, meaning Red and Black). In its early days, the Review published student essays, including on contentious debates at the university such as federation and the status of female students. More recently, the Trinity Times, a student published newspaper, was founded in 2020 with a circulation of around 1000.

=== Student Clubs ===
Trinity College also has its own recognized student clubs which are related to but distinct from the boarder University of Toronto clubs. The clubs get funding directly from the Trinity College Meeting (TCM). The clubs in Trinity are diverse and are sometimes open to the public. Some of the clubs include the above mentioned Literary Institute, Trinity College Chinese Student's association, and The Trinity College Go Club (which has Canadian Go Association recognition).

=== Dramatics ===
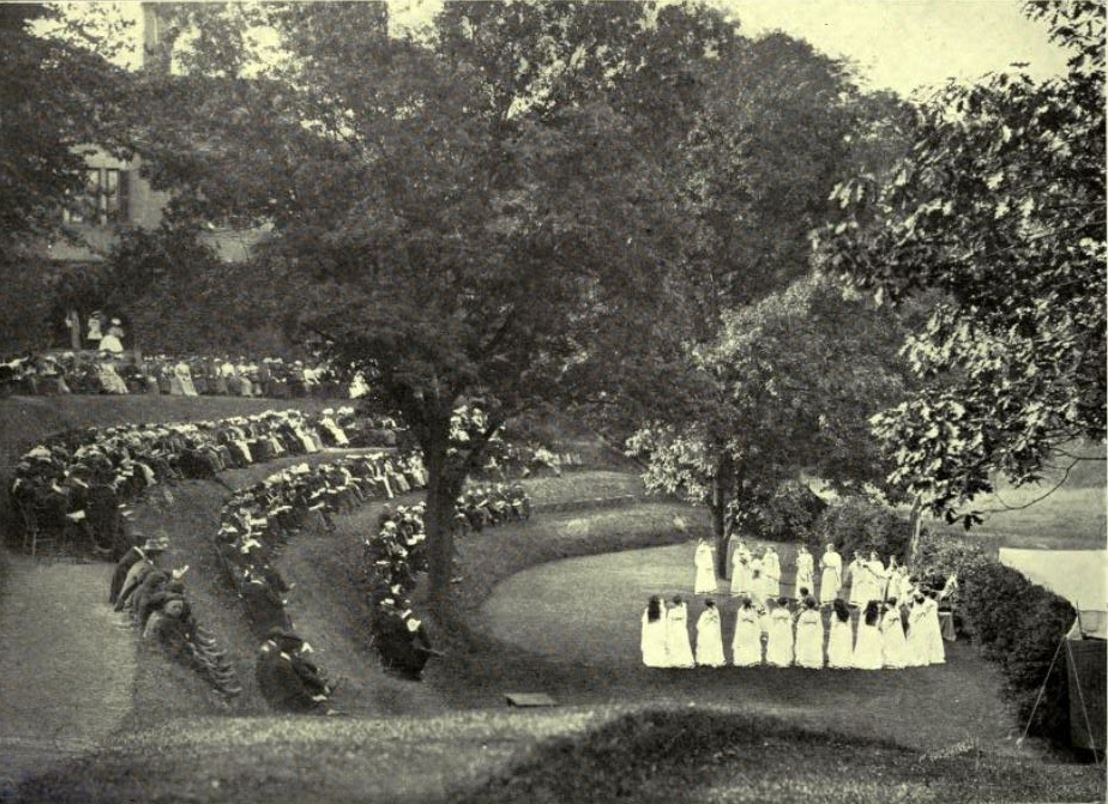
A dramatic performance at Old Trinity, 1902

The Trinity College Dramatic Society (TCDS) was established in 1919, and since 1921 has put on at least one full-length production each year. In recent years the TCDS has produced four shows per season, including a spring musical, selected by the university-elected TCDS committee. The TCDS used Hart House as a performance venue from 1921 until 1979, when the George Ignatieff Theatre (GIT) was constructed at Trinity. While most productions are now in the GIT, plays have also been staged in other rooms at Trinity and outside in the quadrangle, most notably the annual Shakespeare in the Quad production - a continuation of the oldest outdoor Shakespeare festival in Canada. The TCDS frequently performs student-written productions. Prior TCDS student playwrights include the Canadian film director Atom Egoyan and the journalist John Ibbitson.

=== Chapel choir ===
The choir loft

The Trinity College Chapel Choir, which grew out of the Trinity Choral Club established in the 1890s, consists of about 30 singers of mixed voice, selected by audition. Trinity College awards choral scholarships to roughly one third of the choir, tenable for private voice coaching, from an endowment of $125,000. Since the construction of the chapel in 1955, the Chapel Choir has sung an Evensong service every Wednesday night during term, in the tradition of Oxford and Cambridge choral foundations. The Chapel Choir sings from the loft at the rear of the chapel, approximately 20 feet (6.1 m) above the main chapel floor, where the Casavant pipe organ is also located. Accompaniment is provided by the Bevan Organ Scholar, typically an undergraduate music student, who is appointed for three years and paid from a $100,000 endowment. A Director of Music conducts the choir, mentors the organ scholar, and occasionally plays the organ during services. Since 2006, the Director of Music has been Prof. John Tuttle, who is also Professor of Organ at the Faculty of Music, sometime Choirmaster and Organist at St. Thomas's Anglican Church (from 1989 to 2016), and conducted the Exultate Chamber Singers until his retirement in 2010.

=== Residential life ===
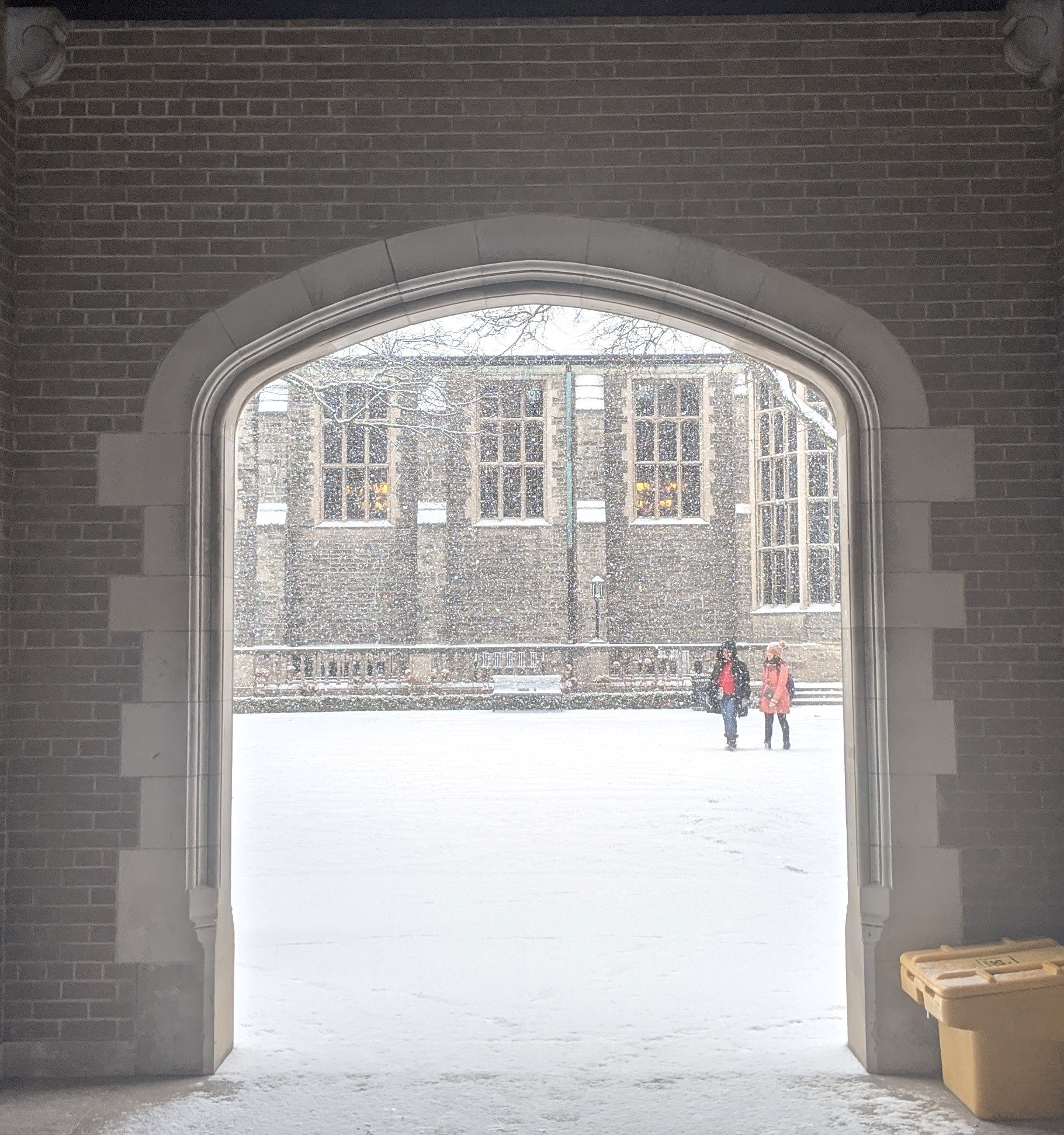
Trinity Quad in Winter

Trinity's Faculty of Arts is the last undergraduate college at the University of Toronto that continues the tradition of Formal Hall during the academic year; High Table dinners are usually held after Evensong on Wednesdays. Before the meal, one of the Student Heads or another positioned member of college (in order of precedence determined by seniority) is responsible for saying the Latin grace: Quae hodie sumpturi sumus, benedicat Deus, per Iesum Christum Dominum Nostrum. Amen. (May God bless what we are about to receive this day, through Jesus Christ our Lord. Amen.) Formal Hall is marked by the enforcement of a number of regulations known as “Strachan Hall Etiquette.” The most evident of these is the dress code, of which Trinity's distinctive academic gowns are the essential element for all members of college. In addition to the wearing of the gown, men were historically required to wear a jacket, collared shirt, long pants and a tie, as well as close-toed shoes. If a member of college has had the honour of being "poored out", they are then permitted to wear their tie tied on the remains of his gown. For women of college, the dress code consists of a similar prohibition on open-toed shoes. The dress code is not longer enforced on all students, though there still is a healthy encouragement to 'dress up' if at all possible.

The various points of etiquette are enforced by the second-year students, led by the Heads of Second Year. The Second Year students act as “deputies of the hall” and are in charge of enforcing the dress code as well as maintaining discipline during the meal. Any student in violation of the dress code will not be allowed to enter the hall until they are dressed appropriately; this regulation is relaxed for non-resident students. The second year students also have the authority to physically eject any student who causes a ruckus during the meal.

In parody of the university's Oxbridge traditions, the first year students would occasionally disrupt the formality of the meal by hurling buns at their fellow undergraduates. When this occurred, it was the job of the second years to eject all offending first years, or occasionally fellow upper years, from the hall. This was generally done with much struggle, however with little injury to any of the parties concerned. As the artillery was traditionally limited to simple bread rolls, no significant damage results from these incidents. This tradition has since fallen into abeyance, as formal dinners went from a daily to a weekly event.

=== Traditions and lore ===
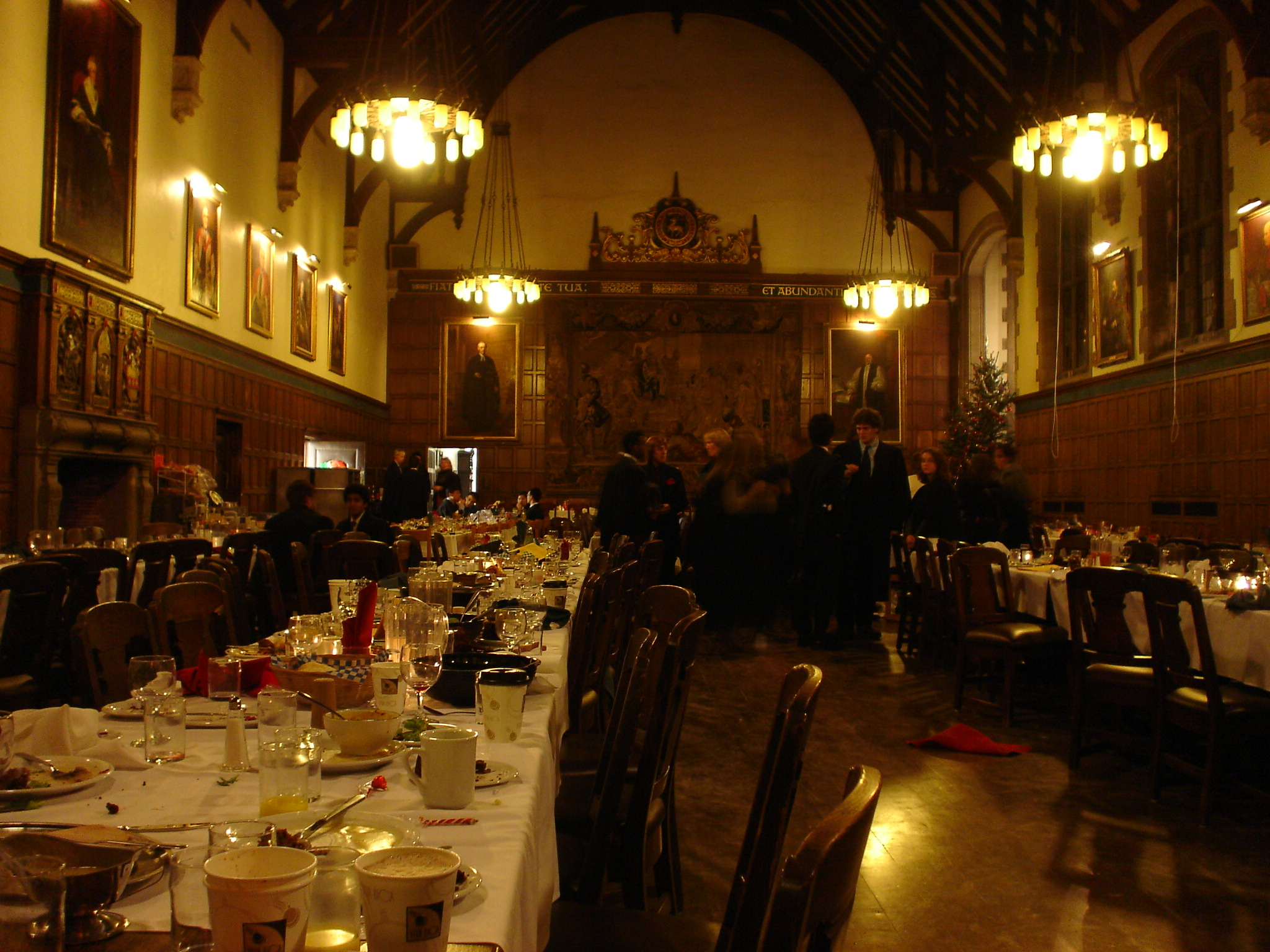
Students departing from the annual Christmas dinner in Strachan Hall

Until 1993, weekday dinners at Trinity College were punctuated by the tradition of "Poorings Out". This tradition was a tongue-in-cheek way of imposing "discipline" on errant male members of college. The name "Pooring out" relates to the "poor" behaviour of the targeted student. Often spurious or humorous reasons would be given for a pooring out. Under this tradition, members of second year would attempt to expel an "errant" student from the dining hall during the first 15 minutes of dinner. The targeted student would lie across the dinner table, and was usually defended by three fellow students who linked together to form a strong a defensive shell over the table and on top of the targeted student. Upon a publicly announced "call" as to the alleged transgression, the assembled members of second year would stampede from their seats to the defenders, where they were given one minute to pull the targeted student off the table. On the rare occasion that a defence did prevail for more than one minute, the defendant was permitted to leave the dining hall on his own feet. Otherwise, the head of second year (or delegate) would drag the defendant out of the hall.

In 1992 a campaign was organised against poorings out by a vocal minority of students who claimed victimisation. University authorities banned poorings out on the basis of legal liability in 1993. Rather than simply disappearing, the tradition of the pooring out has merely evolved to suit the contemporary climate. Today, pooring out is an honour generally reserved for students elected to prominent positions in the university, particularly the Student Heads. Both men and women may now be poored out; however the actual practice is most often gender segregated. For example, a man of college is defended by men and poored out by men, while a woman of college is defended by women and poored out by women. On account of the administration's aforementioned hostility to the practice, they are no longer supposed to take place on university grounds and are absolutely forbidden in Strachan Hall. Rather, poorings-out now often occur during The Lit. However, their actual form has changed little. The student selected to be poored out lies across a table while three of his fellow students lie across him to defend him. The assemblage is then rushed by the upper year students, who shred the gown of the person, while removing his or her defenders. Once a student has been poored out, they wear the remains of their gown bound as a sash. The gown is never to be washed, mended or sewn and must be worn in its original state as a sign of pride for the experiences of the student whilst at Trinity.

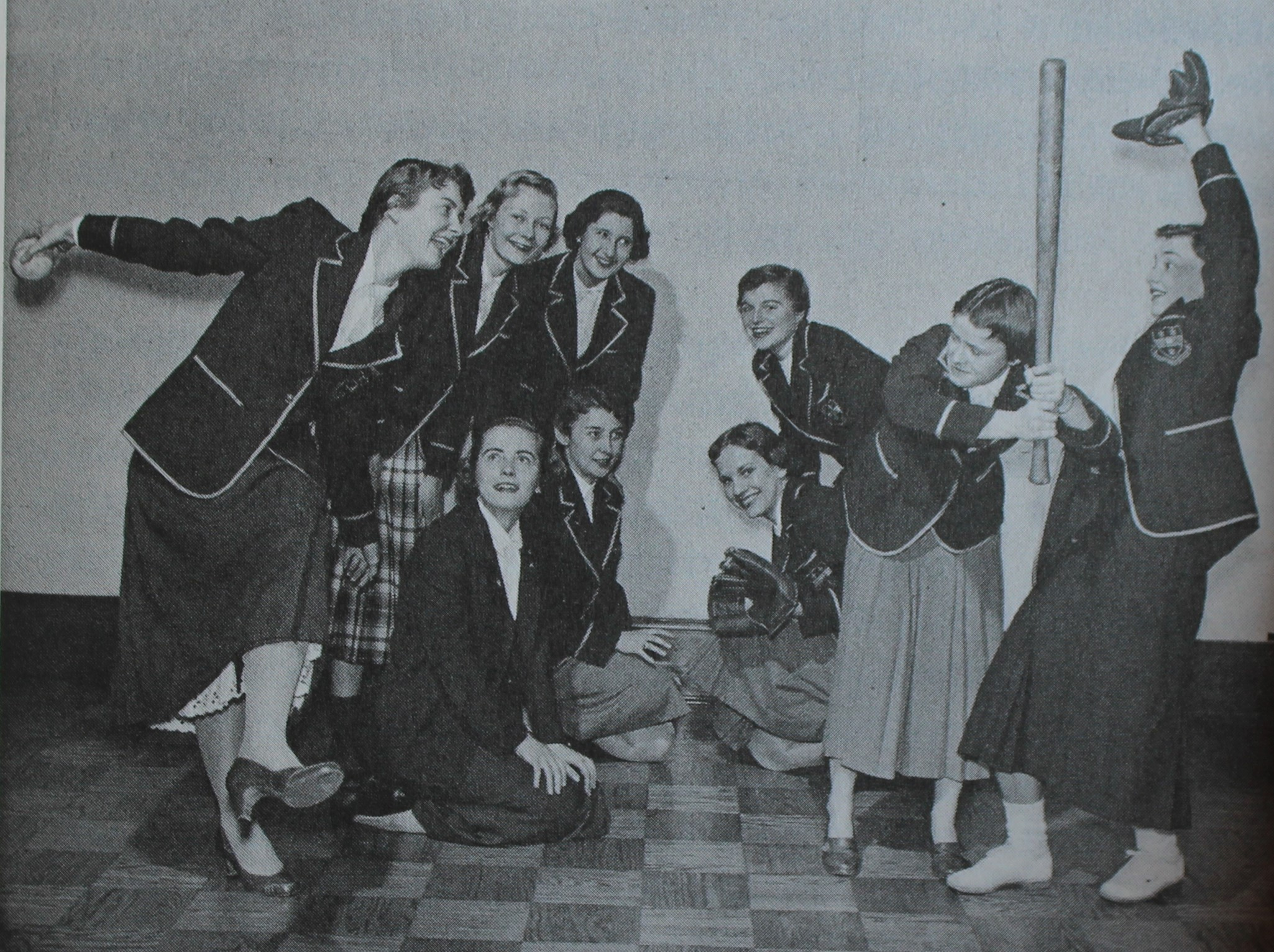
The St. Hilda's College Baseball Team, 1957

Prior to the desegregation of residences in 2005, St. Hilda's College maintained a distinct residence life for the women of college, with its own institutions and traditions. These included an independent student government, literary institute, and dramatic society. Through till the 1950s, St. Hilda's students were required to attend services in the makeshift college chapel, as well as volunteer in the university settlement house. Other St. Hilda's-specific traditions included the wearing of halos, a reference to the nickname "Saints" given by the men of Trinity to the women of St. Hilda's. The men of Trinity often performed "Saints Serenades," which generally involved singing late at night outside the windows of St. Hilda's. Male students were strictly limited in their access to the residence for its first decades of existence. These restrictions were eventually loosened to reflect the changing moral norms of Toronto. Trinity men often found creative ways to sneak into the building after hours, or occasionally engaged in forceful panty raids, to the consternation of the administration.

Episkopon is a controversial student society at Trinity College, with a male branch founded in 1858 and a female branch founded in 1899. The society operated mostly in public, and often with official support and encouragement until it was banned from Trinity grounds by the university administration in the 1990s. Episkopon has since gone underground, and continues to operate as a pseduo-secret society.

== Governance ==
Trinity College was incorporated under an act of the United Province of Canada in 1851, and granted the privileges of a university by a Royal Charter of Queen Victoria of July 16, 1852. The university federated with the University of Toronto under an agreement of 1903, and its present legal status as a federated university is governed under The University of Toronto Act, 1971, as amended. Governance at Trinity College operates according to the College Statutes and regulations, first consolidated in 1982 and substantially revised in 1996.

In its early years, governance at Trinity College was essentially dominated by Bishop Strachan, who held a statutory veto power over the then-unicameral College Council.

Today, the highest governing body at Trinity is the College Corporation. The Corporation presently consists of over 500 elected and statutory members, including alumni, faculty, staff, student leaders, the Anglican Bishops of Ontario, and representatives from each Diocese. Corporation meets biannually, and receives reports from the Provost and chairs of other College bodies, such as the board of trustees and the Senate. Corporation also formally elects the university's Chancellor, Provost, Secretary, and the ceremonial Public Orator and Esquire Bedells.

The College Senate and Board of Trustee are under the authority of the corporation, and meet regularly to oversee the governing of the university. The Board of Trustees sets the university budget, approves academic appointments, sets student residence fees, recommends a candidate for Provost to Corporation, and is generally responsible for all business and affairs of the university not vested in the Senate. The Senate is primarily responsible for approving academic courses and programs to be offered by the university, as well as maintaining policies for student life, safety, and admissions.

The Council of the Faculty of Divinity is a committee of the College Senate, and is responsible for all advising on all matters relating to the Faculty of Divinity.

=== Chancellors and Provosts ===
The Chancellor is the ceremonial head of the Trinity College. They chair meetings of the corporation, and hands out degrees at the Divinity Convocation. The Chancellor is elected by Corporation for five year terms, may be re-elected without restriction, and must be a member of the Anglican Church of Canada.

The Provost is the day-to-day chief executive of the university, and serves as vice-chancellor. The Provost serves for five year terms, and may be re-elected once. The Provost lives at Trinity in a designated "Provost's Lodge."

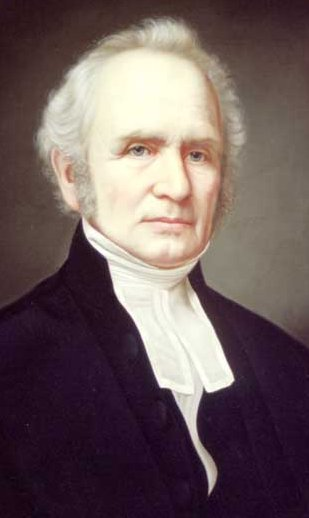
John Beverley Robinson

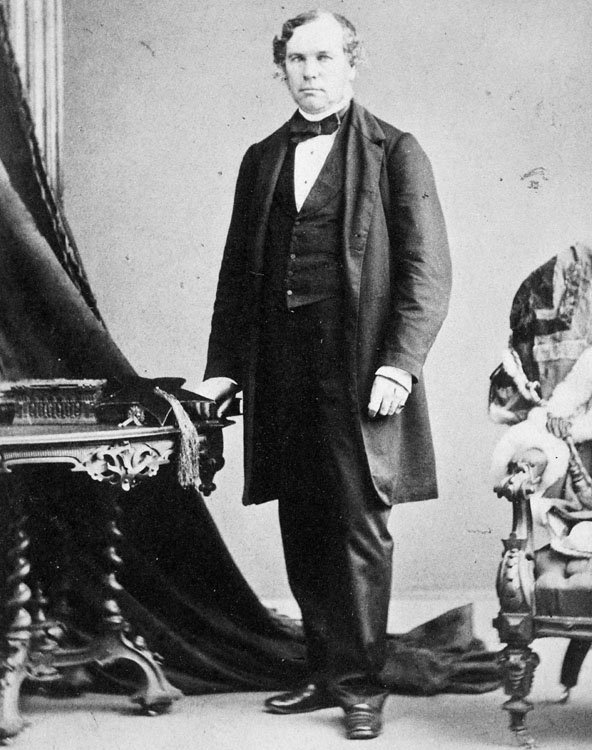
John Hillyard Cameron

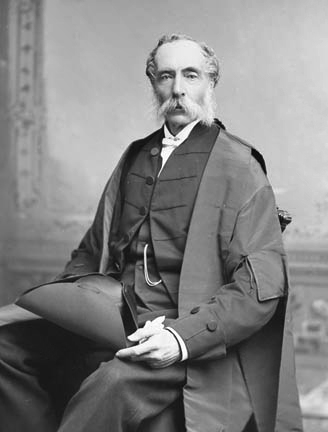
George William Allan

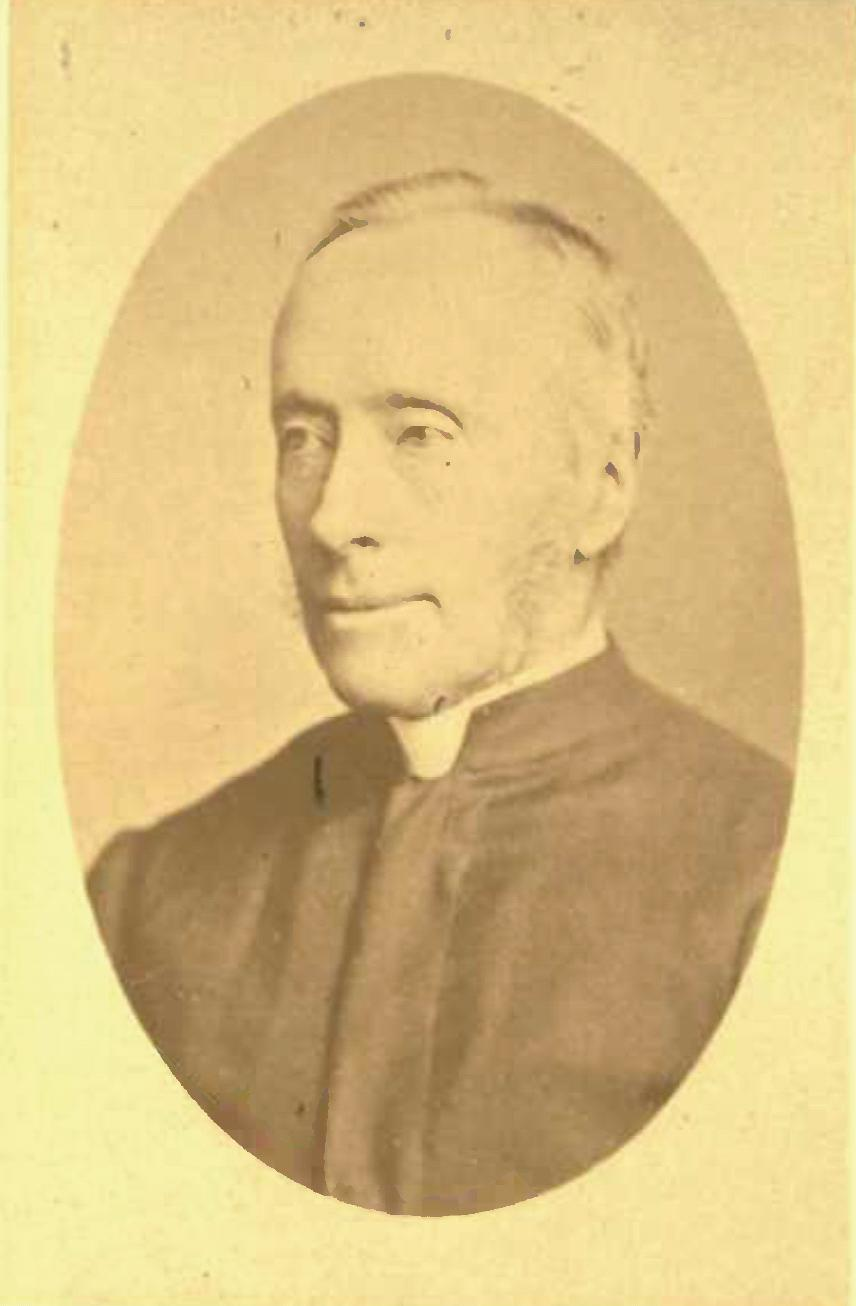
George Whitaker

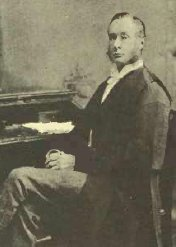
Christopher Robinson

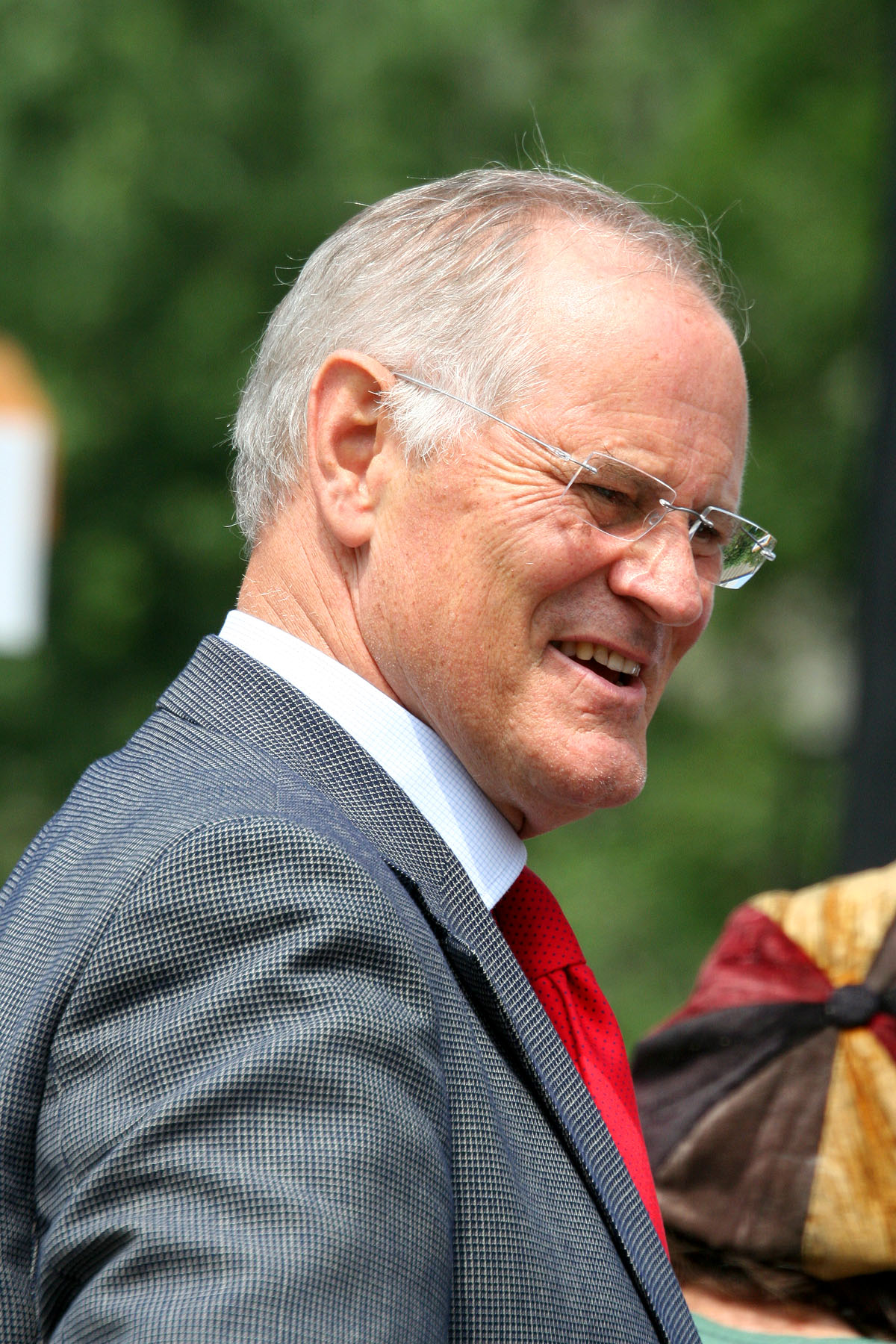
Bill Graham

Chancellors of Trinity College

1. Sir John Beverley Robinson 1852 to 1863
2. The Hon. John Hillyard Cameron 1863 to 1877
3. The Hon. George William Allan 1877 to 1901
4. Christopher Robinson 1902 to 1905
5. John A. Worrell 1914 to 1927
6. Gerard B. Strathy 1954 to 1963
7. Richard C. Berkinshaw 1964 to 1970
8. The Most Rev’d Howard Hewlett Clark 1971 to 1982
9. The Rt. Rev’d Robert Lowther Seaborn 1982 to 1990
10. The Rt. Rev’d John Charles Bothwell 1991 to 2003
11. The Hon. Michael Wilson 2003 to 2007
12. The Hon. Bill Graham 2007 to 2022
13. Brian Lawson 2023–present

Provosts of Trinity College

1. George Whitaker 1851 to 1881
2. Charles W. E. Body 1881 to 1894
3. Edward A. Welch 1895 to 1899
4. Thomas C. S. Macklem 1900 to 1921
5. Charles Allen Seager 1921 to 1926
6. Francis H. Cosgrave 1926 to 1945
7. Reginald S. K. Seeley 1945 to 1957
8. Derwyn R. G. Owen 1957 to 1972
9. George Ignatieff 1972 to 1978
10. F. Kenneth Hare 1979 to 1986
11. Robert H. Painter 1986 to 1996
12. William Thomas Delworth 1996 to 2002
13. Margaret Olwen MacMillan 2002 to 2007
14. Andy Orchard 2007 to 2013
15. Mayo Moran 2014 to 2024
16. Nicholas Terpstra 2024 to Present

== Notable alumni ==
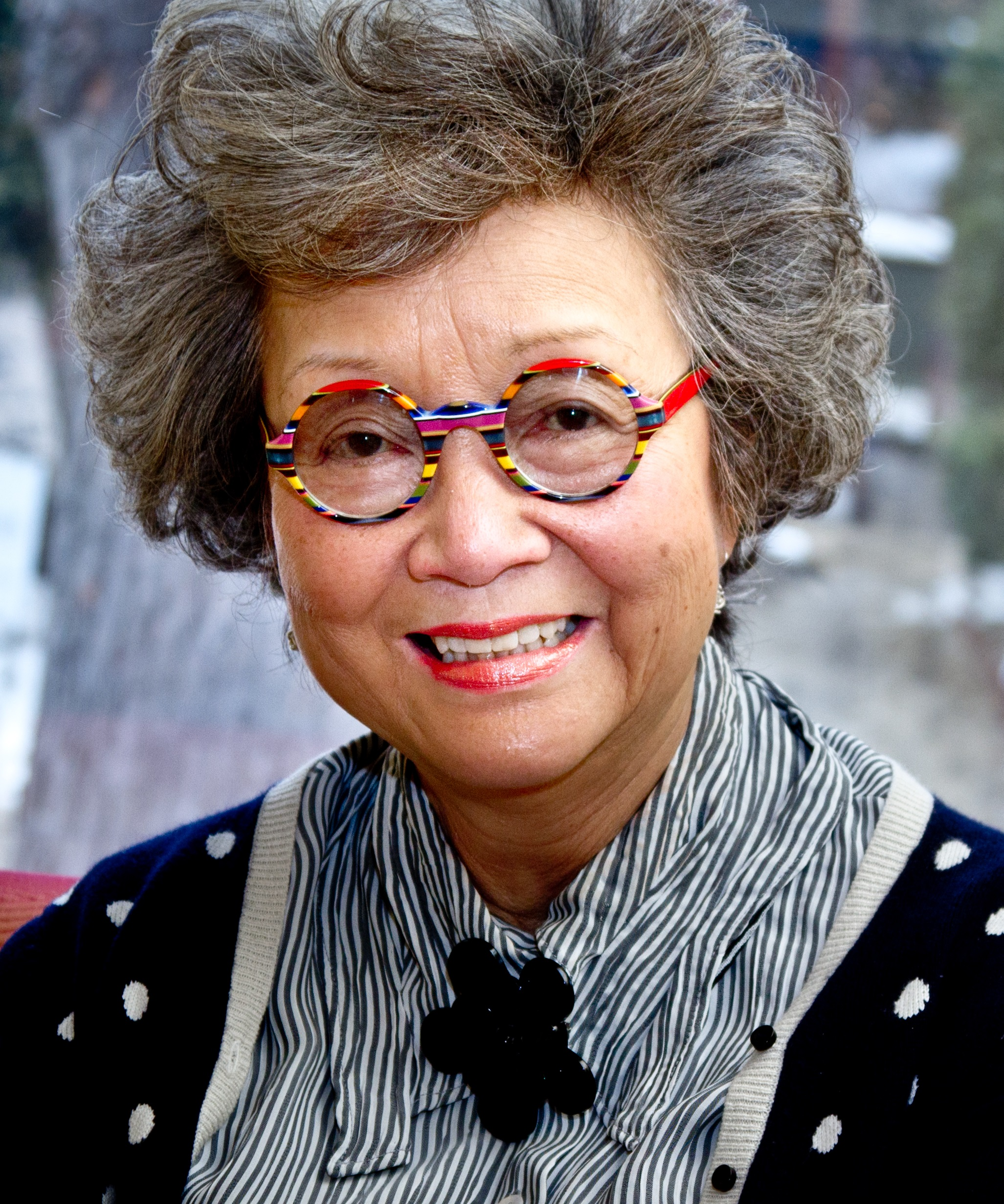
Adrienne Clarkson

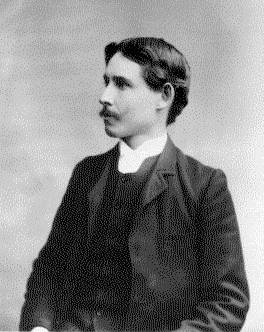
Archibald Lampman

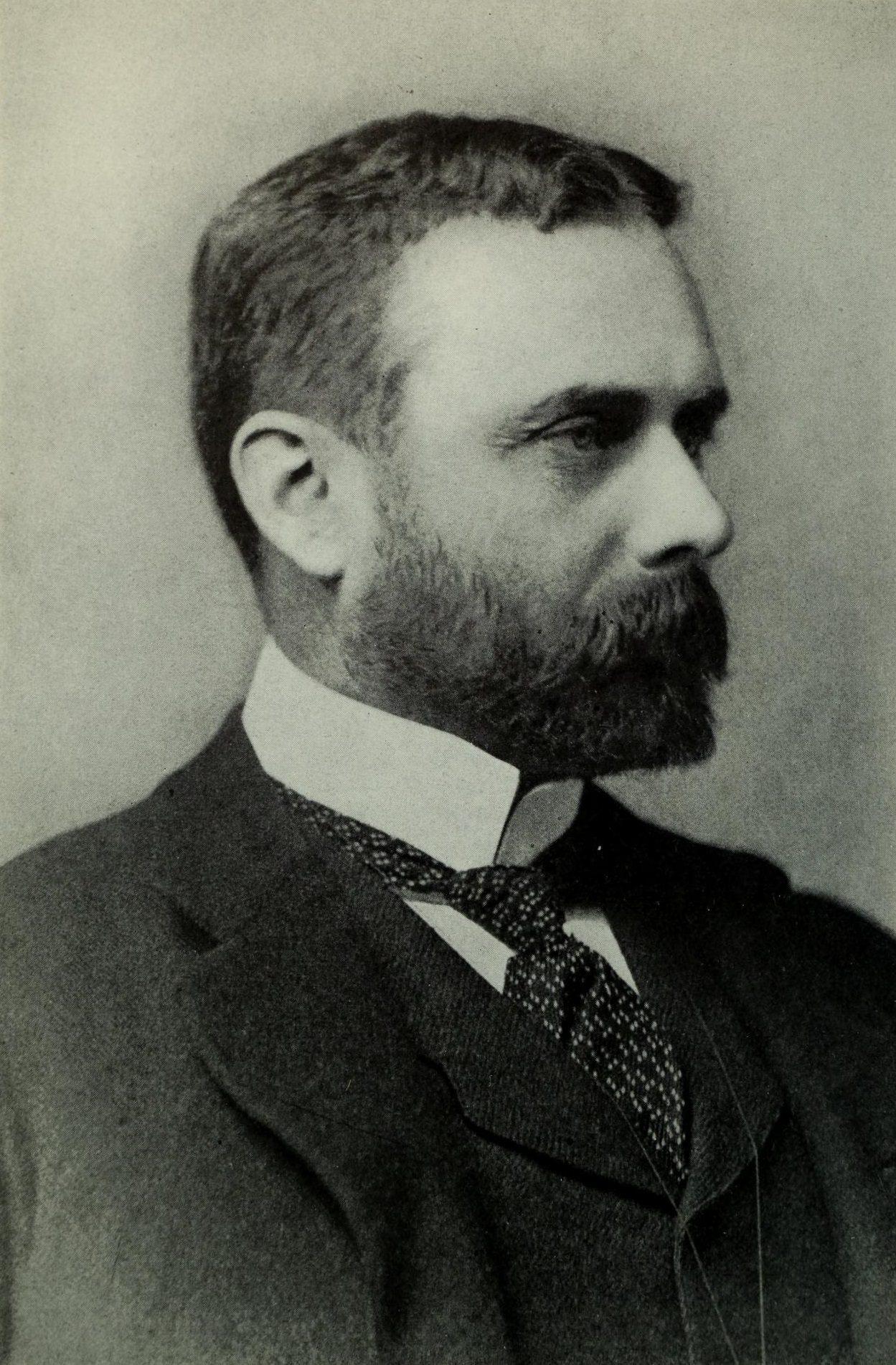
Gilbert Parker

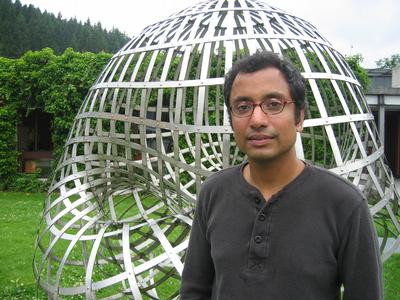
Ravi Vakil

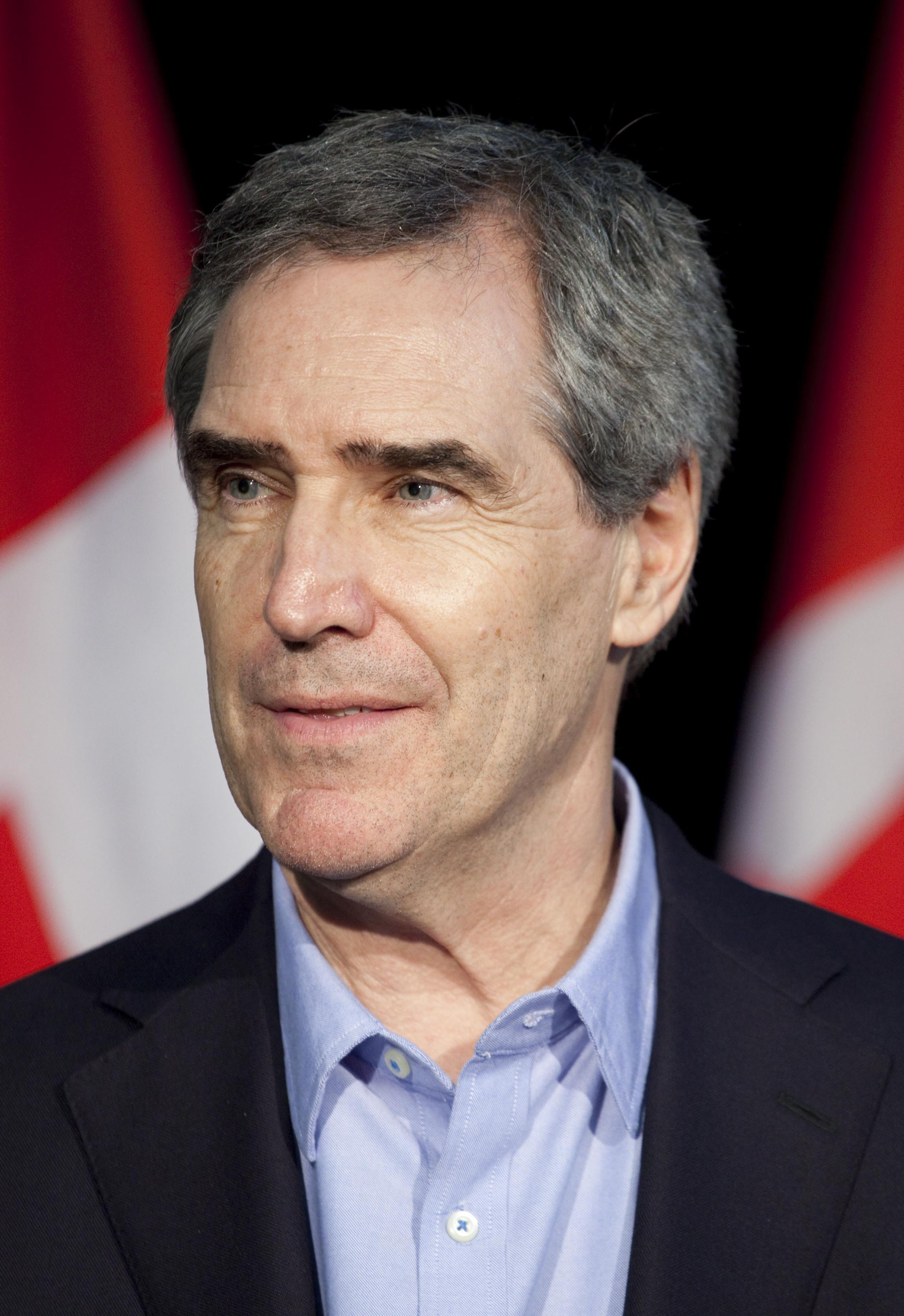
Michael Ignatieff

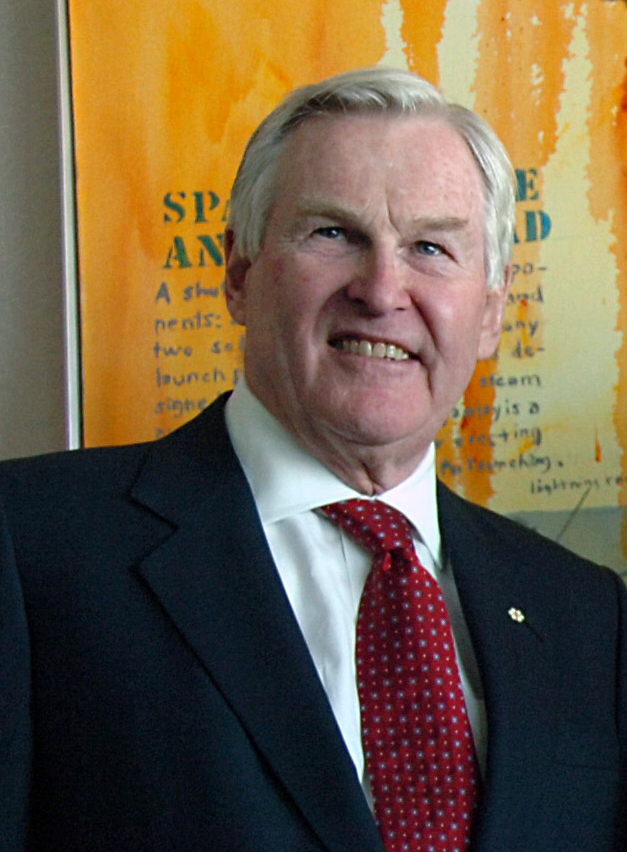
Michael Wilson

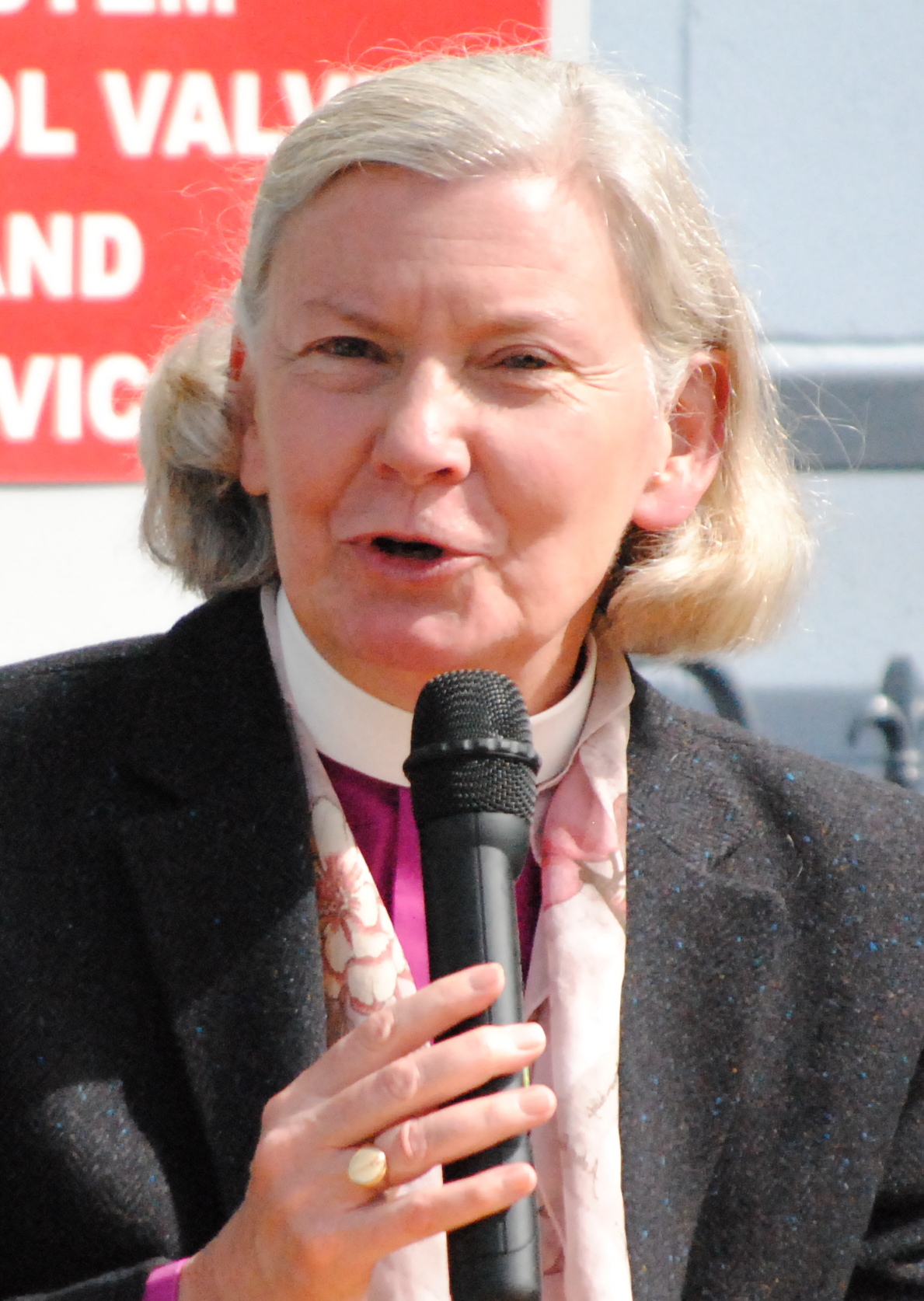
Victoria Matthews

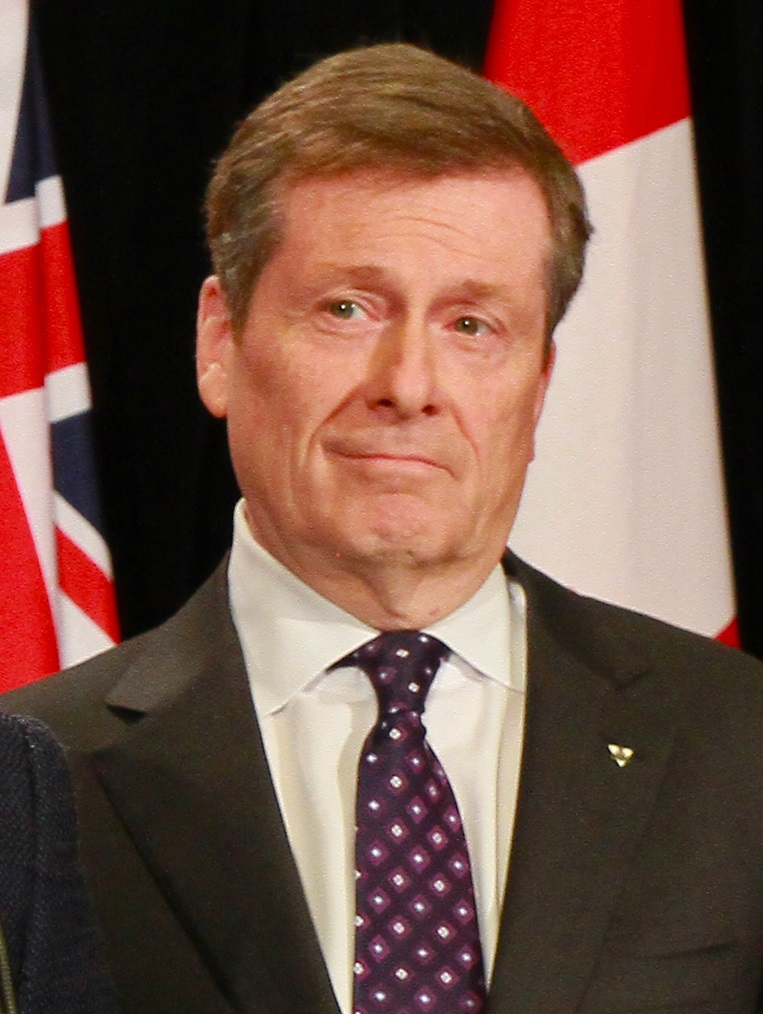
John Tory

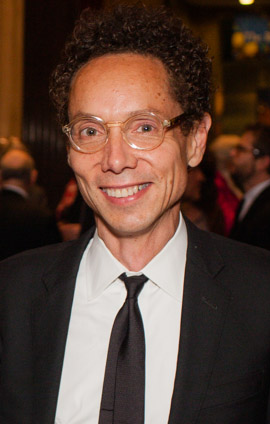
Malcolm Gladwell

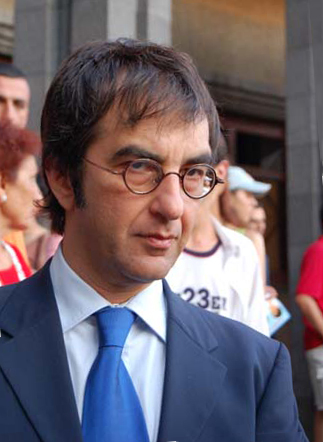
Atom Egoyan

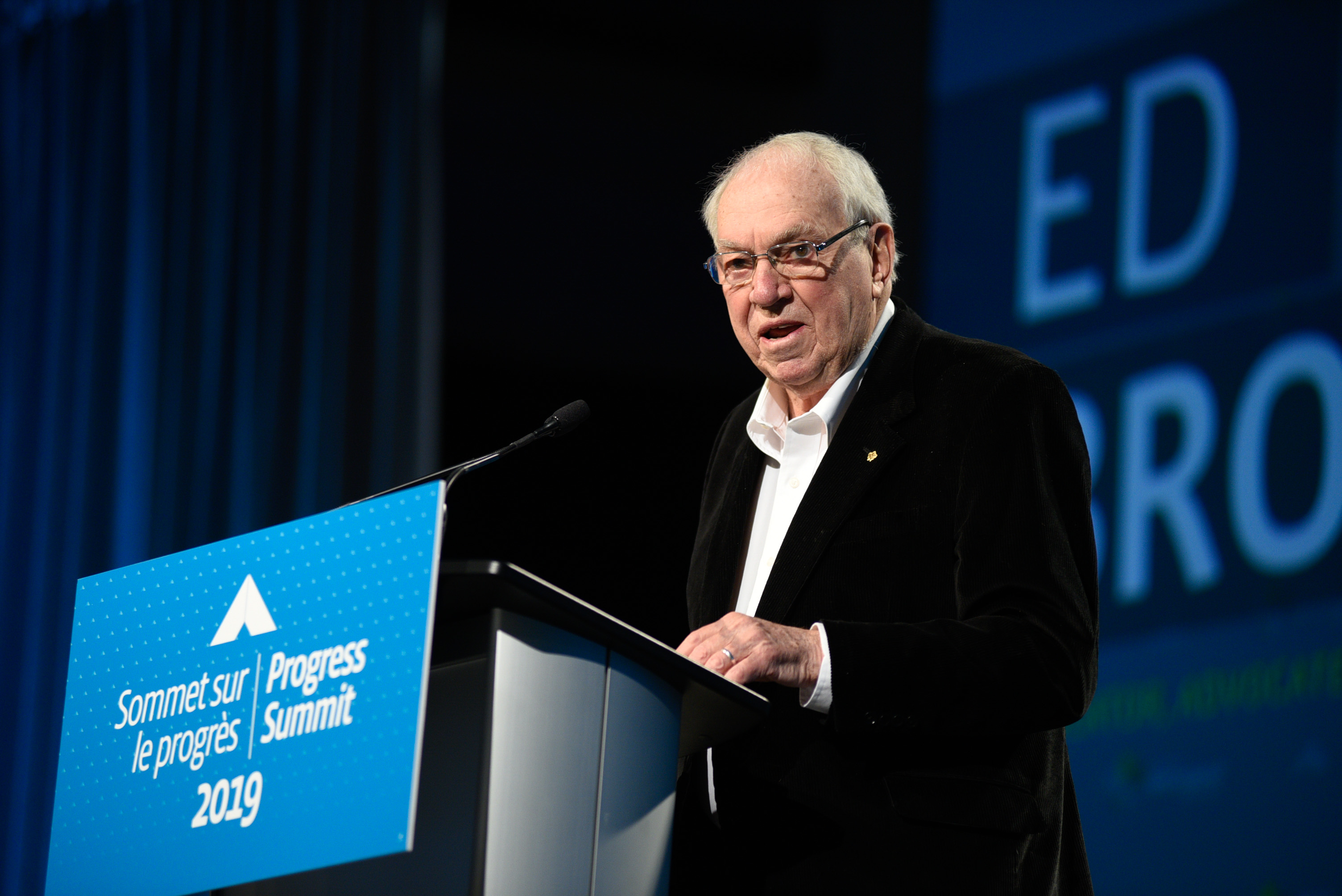
Ed Broadbent

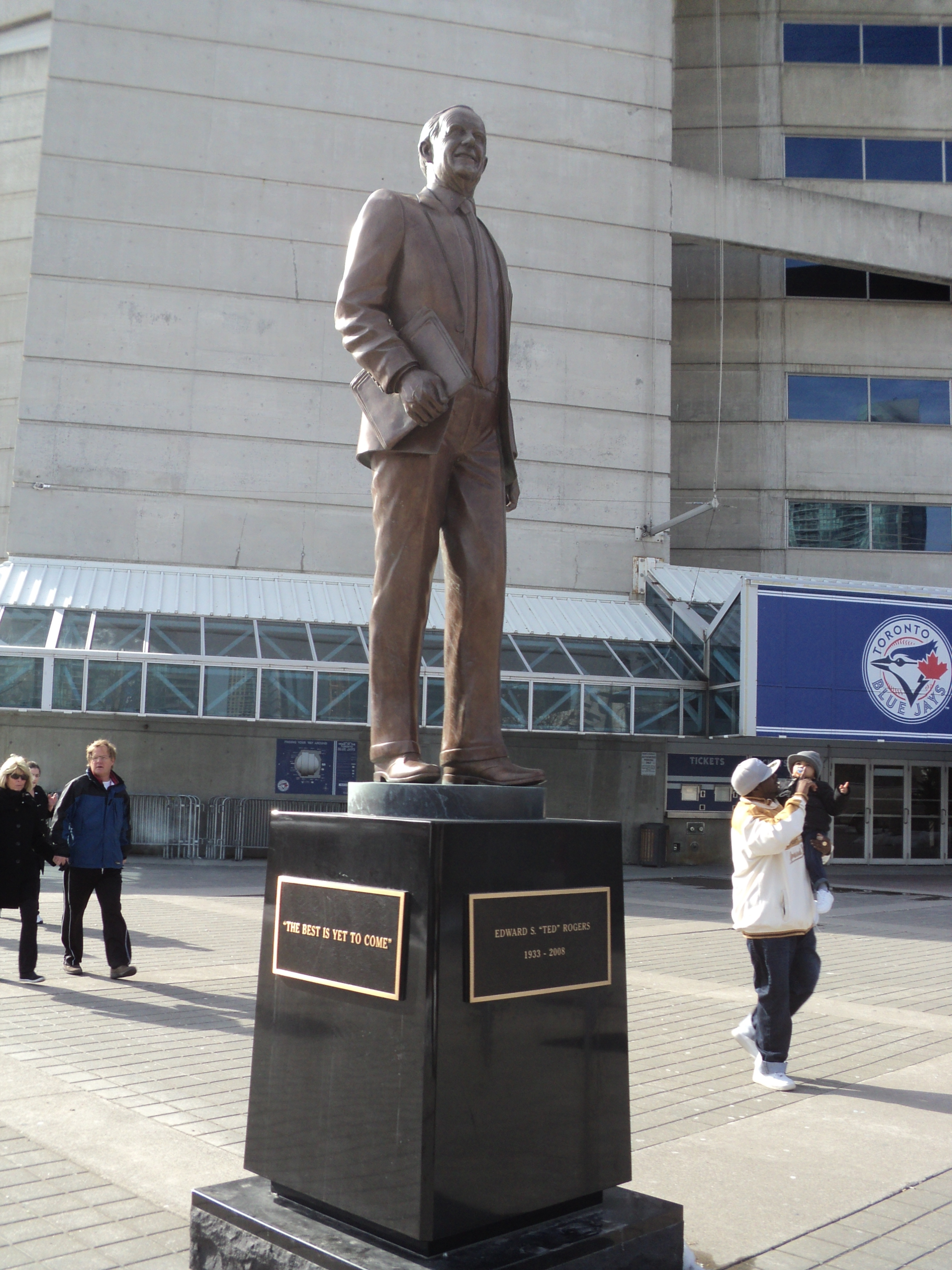
Edward Samuel Rogers

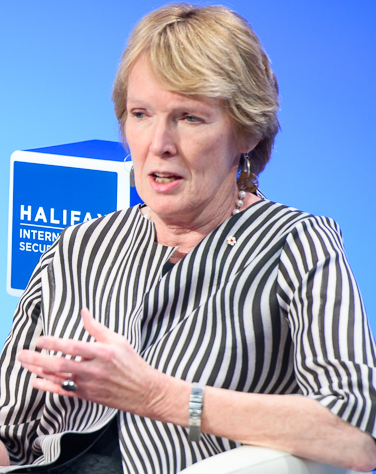
Margaret MacMillan

Trinity has graduated notable academics including theologian William Robinson Clark, Michael Ignatieff, and former Trinity provost Margaret MacMillan, numerous politicians including the aforementioned Michael Ignatieff, his father George Ignatieff, former leader of the opposition and interim leader of the Liberal Party of Canada Bill Graham (Trinity's chancellor from 2007 until his death in 2022), former leader of the New Democratic Party Ed Broadbent, and former Governor General Adrienne Clarkson as well as numerous notable diplomats including former Trinity Chancellor and Canadian Ambassador to the United States Michael Wilson. Stephen Harper, Canada's 22nd Prime Minister, attended Trinity for a brief period before dropping out in his first semester.

To the field of business, Trinity has contributed Ted Rogers, president and CEO of Rogers Communications, and Jim Balsillie, former co-CEO of Research In Motion. To the arts, Trinity has contributed poets Archibald Lampman and Dorothy Livesay, architect Frank Darling, and filmmaker Atom Egoyan. Numerous high-ranking officials in the Anglican Church are also former Trinity students, including Andrew Hutchison, retired Primate of the Anglican Church of Canada. Forty-three graduates of Trinity having been awarded Rhodes Scholarships.

- John Black Aird – Senator and Lieutenant Governor of Ontario
- Gauvin Alexander Bailey – Author and Bader Chair of Southern Baroque Art, Queen's University at Kingston
- Alison Baird – Children's fantasy author
- Jim Balsillie – Co-CEO of Research in Motion
- St. Clair Balfour – Chairman of Southam Newspapers
- Ben Barry – Founder and chief executive officer of the Ben Barry Agency
- David Braid – Composer and pianist
- Addington Bruce – Journalist
- Jackie Burroughs – Actress
- Anthony Burton - former Bishop of Saskatchewan
- J.M.S. Careless – Historian and biographer of George Brown
- Philip Child – Novelist
- Michael Chong – incumbent Member of Parliament for Wellington-Halton Hills and former president of the Queen's Privy Council, minister of intergovernmental affairs, and minister for sport
- Adrienne Clarkson – former governor general of Canada
- Philip Clendenning - (writer, historian ex-NATO analyst). Author of a memoir dealing with Cold War intelligence
- Peter Coffin – former Bishop of Ottawa
- Andrew Comrie-Picard – X Games athlete and TV host
- Michael Coren – Reverend, author, and media personality
- Andrew Coyne – Columnist for the National Post
- John Duffy – Canadian political pundit
- Atom Egoyan – Filmmaker
- E.R. Fairweather - Theologian
- Malcolm Gladwell – Author and columnist for The New Yorker
- Faith Goldy – Far-right political commentator and activist
- Bill Graham – former Member of Parliament for Toronto Centre and Minister of Foreign Affairs and National Defence, 12th Trinity Chancellor
- Jonathan Hart – Scholar, writer, historian
- Bill Hastings – Chief Censor of New Zealand, Chief Justice of Kiribati
- Lawrence Heisey – Philanthropist and businessman
- Andrew Hutchison – Sometime Primate of the Anglican Church of Canada
- William Hutt – Actor
- George Ignatieff – Canadian diplomat, UN ambassador and former Trinity Provost
- Michael Ignatieff – Academic and politician
- Mahmud Jamal – Supreme Court Justice
- Stana Katic – Canadian-American actress and producer
- Craig Kielburger – Founder of Free the Children
- David Ing – Academic and senior consultant
- Colin Johnson – former Bishop of Toronto
- Archibald Lampman – Poet
- Dominic LeBlanc – Member of Parliament for Beauséjour and former Leader of the Government in the House of Commons.
- Leslyn Lewis – Toronto lawyer and Conservative Party politician
- Dorothy Livesay – Poet
- John Lowe - Dean of Divinity at Trinity and later Dean of Christ Church, Oxford and Vice-Chancellor of Oxford University
- Helen Gregory MacGill – Journalist, early female judge, and women's rights activist
- Margaret MacMillan – Historian, best-selling author, and former Trinity provost
- Victoria Matthews – Sometime bishop of Edmonton (Anglican Church of Canada), current bishop of Christchurch
- Sir William Osler – Father of modern medicine
- Sir Gilbert Parker – Novelist and British politician
- Patricia Pearson – Noted Canadian author and journalist
- Michael Peers – Sometime Primate of the Anglican Church of Canada
- Jagoda Pike – Publisher of the Toronto Star
- Paul Poirier – Ice dancer, Olympic bronze medallist
- Ted Rogers – former president and CEO of Rogers Communications
- Tim Sale – Manitoba Cabinet Minister
- Caterina Scorsone – Canadian actress
- Charles Sheard – Toronto's chief medical officer in the late 19th and early 20th century, Member of Parliament
- Ian Shugart – Former clerk of the Privy Council of Canada
- Bruce Stavert – Sometime Archbishop of Quebec and Metropolitan of Canada
- Alastair Sweeny – Writer and web publisher
- R. H. Thomson – Actor
- John Tory – former Mayor of Toronto, Leader of the Ontario Progressive Conservative Party and Leader of the Opposition in Ontario
- Ravi Vakil – Mathematician
- Caroline Louise Josephine Wells – First professionally qualified female dentist in Ontario, Canada
- Michael Wilson – Canadian Ambassador to the United States
- Nigel S. Wright – former managing director of Onex Corporation and former chief of staff to the Prime Minister's Office of Stephen Harper

== Insignias and other representations ==
Trinity College's coat of arms is used as a primary identifier for the university. The arms have a history dating back more than 150 years. The following descriptions are from the Public Register of Arms, Flags and Badges of Canada.

=== Arms of the University of Trinity College ===
Coat of arms of the University of Trinity College
Notes Registered with the Canadian Heraldic Authority on October 18, 1989. Crest A closed book laid flat bound Vert garnished Or reposing thereon a mitre Or the orphreys Azure charged with fourteen trillia flowers leaved proper (seven manifest). Escutcheon The Arms of the Anglican Bishopric of Toronto namely Azure a crosier in bend dexter surmounted by a key in bend sinister Or between an Imperial Crown in chief two open books in fess proper and a dove in base Argent holding in the beak an olive branch Vert impaling Azure a stag trippant reguardant Or attired and unguled Argent all within a bordure Gold. Supporters On the dexter side a unicorn and on the sinister side a Canadian deer both reguardant Or unguled and respectively armed and attired Argent langued Azure the compartment comprising a grassy mount growing therefrom seven trillia leaved proper. Motto ΜΕΤ ΑΓΩΝΑ ΣΤΕΦΑΝΟΣ (Greek for "After the Struggle, the Crown"). Symbolism Arms: The design is based on the arms used by the college since 1857, namely the arms borne by the Right Reverend John Strachan, the first bishop of Toronto and the founder of the college. The left side is the arms of the diocese of Toronto, granted in 1839. The right side is based on Scottish Strachan arms, with the stag made unique to John Strachan by the position of the head and the colour of the antlers and hooves. The border around the shield differentiates the bishop’s arms from the college’s arms. Blue and gold are the college’s academic colours. Crest: The mitre, a symbol of a bishop’s authority, is taken from the arms used by Bishop Strachan. The book indicates the college’s educational function. The trillium flowers are the provincial symbol of Ontario and an allusion to the Holy Trinity in whose honour the college was named. Their number alludes to the seven original faculties of the college. Motto: Meaning “After the struggle, the crown,” this Greek phrase is the first line of the refrain of the college song, which has been in use since the early years of the college. Supporters: The unicorn is a medieval symbol of the incarnation of Christ, and as a supporter of the royal arms of Scotland it pays tribute to Bishop Strachan’s Scottish background. The stag is taken from the Strachan element of the college’s arms, and is also a supporter of the arms of the province of Ontario. The trillium flowers repeat the symbolism of the crest.

=== Arms of the Faculty of Divinity ===
The University of Trinity College's Faculty of Divinity retains its own arms, as described below.

Coat of arms of the Faculty of Divinity, University of Trinity College
Notes Registered with the Canadian Heraldic Authority on October 15, 2004. Escutcheon Quarterly Sable and Gules on a cross Argent between four stags trippant reguardant Or attired and unguled Argent, an open book Argent edged Or, bound and inscribed BUT IF THE SALT in letters Sable. Motto BUT IF THE SALT. Symbolism Arms: The shield resembles a design assumed by Trinity University between 1889 and 1904, and carved as such on the east side of Henderson Tower at the college building. It uses, as a reference to the founder, the Rt. Rev. John Strachan, the form of a stag used in the grant to the University of Trinity College in 1988. Trinity University was a body established in 1889 by the University of Trinity College to grant degrees in seven faculties. The degree-granting powers in six faculties were eventually surrendered to the University of Toronto, but the fact that the Faculty of Divinity continues to grant degrees makes it the remnant of Trinity University, a situation reflected in this design. These arms recognize the venerable student tradition of “red and black” as college colours, with predominance given to black as a traditional clergy colour. At the centre, the open book makes a reference to the Holy Bible. Motto: BUT IF THE SALT is taken from Matthew 5:13 (“but if the salt have lost his savour, wherewith shall it be salted”), and forms an apt reply from the Faculty of Divinity and its students to the undergraduates at Trinity College, whose student cry, based on a phrase in the same biblical verse, begins with the words “We are the salt of the earth”. Following a tradition in academic heraldry, the motto is placed on a book that is part of the shield design.

== Trivia ==
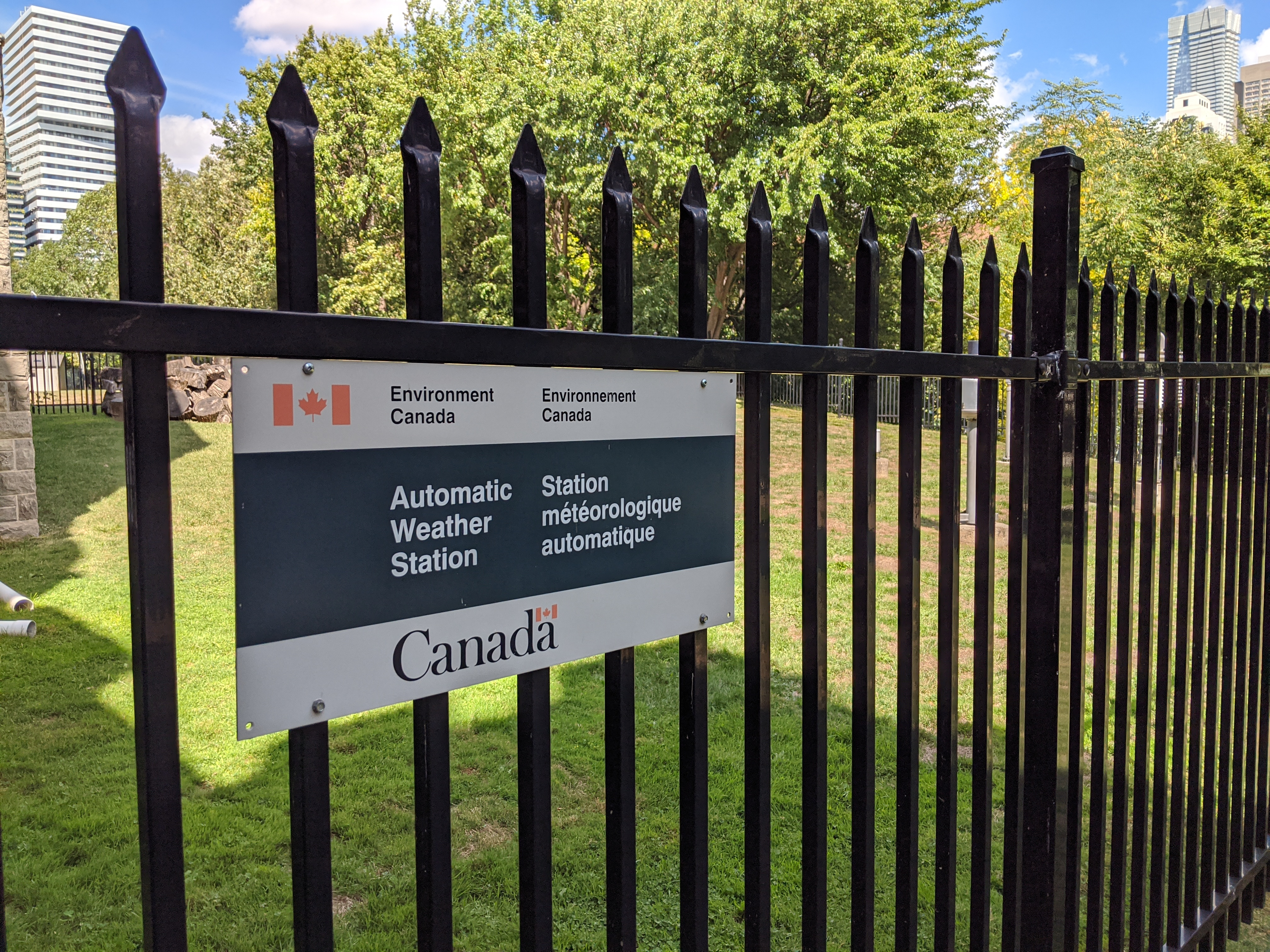
Environment Canada's weather station at Trinity College

- Trinity College is believed by many to be the setting of Robertson Davies' novel The Rebel Angels. Evidence includes the similarities between Trinity and the fictional College described in the text (such as Hollier's office matching Trinity's Organmaster's office), and that a picture of Trinity's central tower (Episkopon Tower) is prominently featured on the cover of the novel's first edition.
- On April 30, 2002, Canada Post issued "University of Trinity College, 1852–2002" as part of the Canadian Universities series. The stamp was based on a design by Steven Slipp, based on photographs by James Steeves and on an illustration by Bonnie Ross. The 48¢ stamps are perforated 13.5 and were printed by Ashton-Potter Canada Limited.
- The Trinity College campus has served as the filming set for scenes in many movies and television series, including Searching for Bobby Fischer, The Skulls, Tommy Boy, Moonlight and Valentino, Class of '96, TekWar, and Ararat and also Relic Hunter.
- Since 1987, Environment Canada has hosted a climatological observation station on the Eastern edge of the Trinity grounds, between the residence houses and Philosopher's Walk
- The University of Toronto Beekeeping Education Enthusiast Society maintains two beehives on the roof of Trinity's eastern Henderson Tower
