= Caesar Wright =

Canadian legal scholar

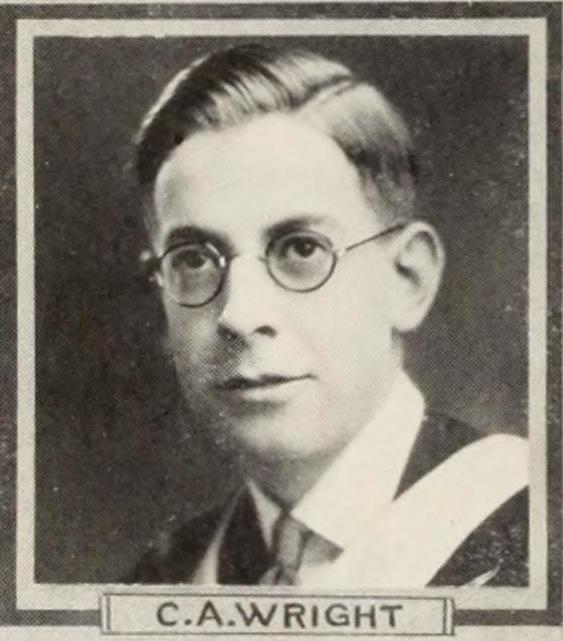
- Wright on his graduation from the University of Western Ontario in 1923

2nd Dean of the University of Toronto Faculty of Law
- In office 1949 – 1965
- Preceded by: W. P. M. Kennedy
- Succeeded by: Ronald St. John Macdonald

Personal details
- Born: Cecil Augustus Wright; June 2, 1904
- Died: April 24, 1967
- Education: University of Western Ontario (BA); Osgoode Hall Law School

Cecil Augustus Wright (July 2, 1904 – April 24, 1967), often called Caesar Wright, was a Canadian jurist and law professor. He was among the first law professors to import the Harvard case method into Canadian legal education. He was also known for his confrontational and aggressive personality.

== Early life and education ==
Cecil Augustus Wright was born in London, Ontario, on July 2, 1904, to Emily Rosena (Whitehall) and Thomas Augustus Wright. He received a BA from the University of Western Ontario in 1923, where he studied economics, history, and political science.

In 1926, at age 22, he graduated from Osgoode Hall Law School.

== Career ==
Wright taught at Osgoode from 1927. During this time he championed many reforms of the legal education system, and in particular favoured a greater role for classroom instruction over the existing apprenticeship model.

In 1949, the Law Society of Upper Canada rejected his proposed reforms and Wright left Osgoode to become dean of the University of Toronto Faculty of Law. Together with other professors, including Bora Laskin, he shaped the undergraduate law program into a professional law school, which was eventually accredited by the Law Society in 1957. He remained with the university until his death on April 24, 1967, in Toronto. Before his death, he had resigned effective June 30 of that year.

According to the legal historian R. Blake Brown, Wright has been regarded as "the founder of Canadian tort law scholarship".

== Sources ==
- Bickenbach, Jerome E.; Kyer, Clifford Ian (1983). "The Harvardization of Caesar Wright". University of Toronto Law Journal. 33 (2): 162–183. doi:10.2307/825431. JSTOR 825431.
- Bickenbach, Jerome E.; Kyer, Clifford Ian (1987). The Fiercest Debate: Cecil A. Wright, the Benchers, and Legal Education in Ontario, 1923–1957. University of Toronto Press. ISBN 978-1-4875-8947-9. OCLC 1006419868.
- Brown, R. Blake (2001). "Cecil A. Wright and the Foundations of Canadian Tort Law Scholarship". Saskatchewan Law Review. 64: 169–218.
- Friedland, Martin L. (2002). The University of Toronto: A History. University of Toronto Press. ISBN 978-1-4426-8250-4. OCLC 809041543.
- Laskin, Bora (1967). "Cecil A. Wright—A Tribute". Canadian Bar Review. 45 (2): 215–218. 1967 CanLIIDocs 38.
