= University of Toronto Faculty of Law Review =

- Discipline: Law review
- Language: English, French abstracts

Publication details
- Former name: School of Law Review
- History: 1942–present
- Publisher: Carswell (Canada)
- Frequency: Biannual

Standard abbreviations
- Bluebook: U. Toronto Fac. L. Rev.
- ISO 4: Univ. Tor. Fac. Law Rev.

Indexing
- ISSN: 0381-1638
- OCLC no.: 49374375

Links
- Journal homepage

The University of Toronto Faculty of Law Review (French: Revue de la faculté de droit de l'Université de Toronto) is a law review at the University of Toronto Faculty of Law, run by law students at the Faculty and publishing scholarly work by law students from any institution.

It was first published in 1942, when it was called the School of Law Review (University of Toronto). It is ranked by John Doyle at the Washington and Lee University School of Law as tied for 6th-ranked law journal outside of the United States (including both student and faculty journals). According to an article it published in 2001, at that time the journal had been cited in 22 cases decided by the Supreme Court of Canada. It has since been cited by the Supreme Court a total of 12 times.

== Notable editors ==
- Stephen Waddams, editor-in-chief, 1966.
- Ronald J. Daniels, editor-in-chief, 1985.
- Kent Roach, editor-in-chief, 1986.
