= W. P. M. Kennedy =

Canadian historian and legal scholar

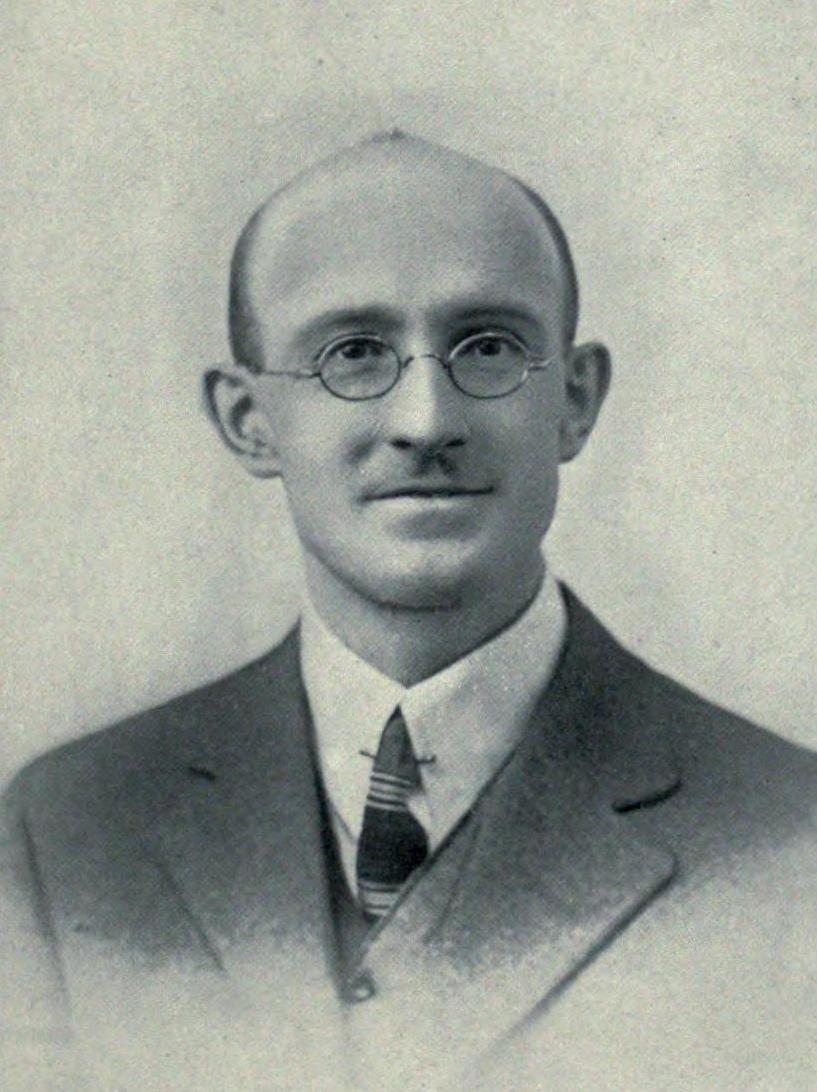
- Kennedy c. 1915

1st Dean of the University of Toronto Faculty of Law
- In office 1943 – 1949
- Preceded by: Position established
- Succeeded by: Cecil Wright

Personal details
- Born: William Paul McClure Kennedy; January 8, 1879
- Died: August 12, 1963
- Education: Trinity College Dublin (MA) (LittD)

William Paul McClure Kennedy (January 8, 1879 – August 12, 1963) was a Canadian historian and legal scholar. He was the first dean of the University of Toronto Faculty of Law.

== Early life and education ==
Kennedy was born in Shankill, Dublin, on January 8, 1879. He graduated from Trinity College Dublin in 1900 with an MA and LittD. Kennedy came to Canada from Ireland in 1913, taking up a post at St. Francis Xavier University. He moved to the University of Toronto in 1915, teaching history, politics, and constitutional law.

== Academic career ==
Kennedy founded the University of Toronto Law Journal in 1935, editing the journal until 1949. Also in 1935, he was named a fellow of the Royal Society of Canada. In 1937, he worked as an advisor to the Rowell–Sirois Commission. Kennedy advised the attorney-general and a parliamentary committee on potential revisions to the British North America Act. He became the first dean of the University of Toronto Faculty of Law in 1944.

Kennedy's early constitutional scholarship argued against the concept of the nation state as applied in the Canadian context. He followed the views of Lord Acton, who stressed that states formed on the basis of national self-determination put liberty at risk. Instead, he argued in favour of what Carl Berger calls "relative autonomy" for Canada, then a dominion, within the broader British Empire.

Kennedy died on August 12, 1963, in Toronto.

== Publications ==
- Studies in Tudor History. Toronto; London: Copp Clark Co; Constable. 1916. OCLC 252242854.
- The Constitution of Canada: An Introduction to Its Development and Law. London: Oxford University Press. 1922. OCLC 697697019.
- Essays in Constitutional Law. Humphrey Sumner Milford; Oxford University Press. 1934. OCLC 251183870.
