= Frank Iacobucci =

Former Justice of the Supreme Court of Canada (born 1937)

The Honourable Frank Iacobucci CC KC LSM OMRI

President of the University of Toronto
- Interim; September 2004 – June 2005
- Chancellor: Vivienne Poy
- Preceded by: Robert J. Birgeneau
- Succeeded by: Vivek Goel (acting)

Puisne Justice of the Supreme Court of Canada
- In office January 7, 1991 – July 1, 2004
- Nominated by: Brian Mulroney
- Preceded by: Bertha Wilson
- Succeeded by: Rosalie Abella

Chief Justice of the Federal Court of Canada
- In office September 2, 1988 – January 6, 1991
- Nominated by: Brian Mulroney
- Appointed by: Jeanne Sauvé
- Preceded by: James Alexander Jerome
- Succeeded by: John D. Richard

Deputy Minister of Justice Deputy Attorney General of Canada
- In office September 30, 1985 – September 2, 1988
- Minister: John Crosbie; Ray Hnatyshyn
- Preceded by: Roger Tassé
- Succeeded by: John C. Tait
Other positions
6th Vice-President and Provost of the University of Toronto
In office November 1983 – September 1985
President	David Strangway; George Connell
Preceded by	David Strangway
Succeeded by	Joan Foley
5th Dean of the University of Toronto Faculty of Law
In office 1979 – 1983
Preceded by	Martin Friedland
Succeeded by	Robert Prichard

Personal details
- Born: June 29, 1937 (age 89) Vancouver, British Columbia, Canada
- Spouse: Nancy Eastham (m. 1964)
- Children: Edward Iacobucci
- Education: University of British Columbia; University of Cambridge
- Profession: Lawyer; academic; civil servant

Frank Iacobucci CC KC LSM OMRI (born June 29, 1937) is a former Puisne Justice of the Supreme Court of Canada from 1991 until he retired from the bench in 2004. He was the first Italian-Canadian judge on the court. Iacobucci was also the first judge on the Supreme Court to have been born, raised and educated in British Columbia. Iacobucci has had a distinguished career in private practice, academia, the civil service and the judiciary.

Before his elevation to the nation's top court, he was a tenured professor of law at the University of Toronto Faculty of Law for eighteen years, and was appointed dean of the faculty in 1979. From 1985 to 1988, he served as the Deputy Attorney General of Canada, playing a key role in constitutional law negotiations during the Meech Lake Accord process. Prime Minister Brian Mulroney appointed him Chief Justice of the Federal Court of Canada in 1988.

As a former private corporate lawyer, he is considered an expert in business and tax law. He currently serves as senior counsel at the business law firm Torys LLP.

== Early life ==
Iacobucci was born in Vancouver, British Columbia to working-class Italian immigrants, Gabriel Iacobucci and Rosina Pirillo. His father emigrated from Abruzzo in 1922 and his mother emigrated from Calabria in 1925. He was the third of four children and attended Britannia Secondary School. In high school he worked in a steel foundry alongside his father and was inspired by the story of Angelo Branca to pursue law. As his parents did not have the opportunity to receive a formal education, they stressed the importance of their children receiving higher education.

Iacobucci received a Bachelor of Commerce (BComm.) degree in 1961 and a Bachelor of Laws (LL.B) degree in 1962, both from the University of British Columbia. While attending the University of British Columbia, he became a brother of Phi Gamma Delta.

He received a Master of Laws (LL.M) degree in 1964 and a diploma in international law (Dip Int'L) in 1966, both from the University of Cambridge.

He was called by The Law Society of Upper Canada to the Ontario bar in 1970.

== Career ==
Iacobucci practiced corporate law and related fields at Dewey, Ballantine, Bushby, Palmer & Wood in New York City from 1964 until 1967.

Taking a chance to pursue a career in academia, he was an associate professor and then a professor of law at the University of Toronto Faculty of Law between 1967 and 1985. He subsequently served as associate dean of the faculty from 1973 to 1975, and was a visiting fellow at Wolfson College in 1978. He served as dean of the faculty from 1979 to 1983. He also acted as vice-president and provost of the university from November 1983 to September 1985. From 1982 to 1985, Iacobucci was also a commissioner of the Ontario Securities Commission and was counsel to the Estey Commission in 1974.

Iacobucci was also a part of several noteworthy organizations. He was director for the National Congress of Italian Canadians from 1979 to 1983, and became vice-president in 1980, serving for three years. He was also vice-president and a member of the board of governors for the Canadian Institute of Advanced Legal Studies from 1981 to 1998. From 1976 to 1988, he was the director of the Multicultural History Society of Ontario. Additionally, Iacobucci was also the director of Cambridge Canada Trust for seven years beginning in 1984.

He entered the public service in 1985 as Deputy Minister of Justice and Deputy Attorney General of Canada in the federal government. He was a principal member of the federal team in negotiations over the Meech Lake Accord in 1987. Just three years after entering the civil service, in September 1988, he was appointed Chief Justice of the Federal Court.

Iacobucci was a member of the Canadian Judicial Council and Education Committee from 1988 to 1991 and was on the executive committee in his last year. In 1989, he became the governor of the Canadian Judicial Centre/National Judicial Institute until 2004. He is a former elder at Islington United Church.

On January 7, 1991, Justice Iacobucci was appointed as justice of the Supreme Court of Canada by Conservative Prime Minister Brian Mulroney and served in this capacity until retiring on July 1, 2004.

While serving as a Supreme Court judge, he was also a member of the advisory council for the International Centre for Criminal Law Reform and Criminal Justice Policy before becoming director in 1993. In 1996, Iacobucci sat on the advisory committee as a member for McGill University Faculty of Law until 2004. He was a member of the advisory board for the Institute of Canadian Studies at the University of Ottawa from 1998 to 2004.

== Engagements after retiring from court ==
Following his retirement from the Supreme Court, Iacobucci was appointed interim president of the University of Toronto in 2004 and served in that post until he was replaced by acting president Vivek Goel in July 2005, who filled in until the 15th president, David Naylor, took office in October 2005.

He was a conduct review advisor with the Canada Pension Plan Investment Board from 2005 to 2018 and a member of the Ontario Law Commission from 2006 to 2012.

Iacobucci was appointed by the Government of Canada in June 2005 as its representative to lead discussions toward a fair and lasting resolution of the legacy of Indian residential schools. He also chairs the selection committee for commissioners of the Indian Residential Schools Truth and Reconciliation Commission.

In September of that same year, he joined Torys LLP, as counsel, and since 2005 has been the chair of the Higher Education Quality Council of Ontario.

He is the chair of the Dean's Advisory Committee for the National Centre for Business Law at the University of British Columbia Faculty of Law.

He sat on a number of board of directors, including Torstar, publisher of the Toronto Star and a series of smaller newspapers, and owner of Harlequin Enterprises, a global publisher of popular romance novels. Iacobucci is the former chairman of Torstar.

Iacobucci served as the commissioner of an internal inquiry into the role of Canadian officials in the torture and detention of three Arab-Canadians in Syria and Egypt as the personal appointee of Conservative prime minister Stephen Harper. The report concludes that deficient information-sharing by CSIS and the RCMP likely contributed indirectly to the detention of Mr. Nureddin and Mr. Elaati, and that similar sharing of information likely contributed to the mistreatment amounting to torture of all three.

On August 11, 2011, Ontario announced Iacobucci's appointment to "review the process for including individuals living in First Nations reserve communities on the (Ontario's) jury rolls," following concerns from First Nation organizations and jurists about Aboriginal people being under-represented on juries in Ontario. The report, released in February, 2013, determined under-representation of individuals living on reserves on Ontario's jury roll to be a symptom of a crisis. He expressed hope his report would serve as a wake-up call to remedy broader and systemic issues that are at the heart of the current dysfunctional relationship between Ontario's justice system and Aboriginal peoples in the province. In addition to 17 specific recommendations, Iacobucci emphasized the need for establishing a government-to-government relationship that "incorporates an underlying respect for cultural, traditional, and historical values that are different." He stated, "This government-to-government relationship... must underlie the relationship between Ontario and First Nations going forward in dealing with justice and jury representation issues."

From 2006 to 2012, he was involved with the Higher Education Quality Council of Ontario. He joined the advisory board of General Motors of Canada in 2006, where he continues to serve to this day. At the same time, he was the lead director at Tim Hortons until 2014.

From 2006 to 2007, he was a Trudeau Foundation mentor.

On August 28, 2013, in response to the July 27, 2013 shooting death of Sammy Yatim by Toronto Police officer James Forcillo, Iacobucci was requested by Chief of Police Bill Blair to conduct an independent review of "the policies, practices, and procedures of, and the services provided by, the TPS concerning the use of lethal force or potentially lethal force, in particular in encounters with persons who are or may be emotionally disturbed, mentally disturbed or cognitively impaired.". On July 24, 2014, the "Police Encounters with People in Crisis – An Independent Review Conducted by The Honourable Frank Iacobucci for Chief of Police William Blair, Toronto Police Service" report was delivered and was released to the public by Chief Blair. The 400+ page report made 84 recommendations pertaining to the mental health system and Toronto Police and focusing on police culture, training, supervision, and selection of new officers, the mental health of police personnel, use of force, crisis intervention, and equipment, along with suggestions surrounding implementation of the reports recommendations. The report, originally arranged by Blair under his authority as chief, without Toronto Police Services Board approval, was contracted through the Toronto law firm of Torys LLP for the $500,000.00 maximum funding amount the chief was authorized to approve without board approval; in May 2014, after the majority of the work had been performed, the chief requested, and the board ultimately approved, the revised cost for the report of $985,000.00.

From 2014 to 2017, he was a member of the board of directors for the Canadians for a New Partnership.

In November 2015, the Government of Alberta retained Iacobucci to conduct an independent review of—and advice in connection with—the decision of former Alberta Ethics Commissioner Neil Wilkinson to clear former Alberta premier Alison Redford of conflict of interest charges under Alberta's Conflicts of Interest Act resulting from Redford having awarded the contract for a multibillion-dollar contract to conduct litigation against tobacco companies on behalf of the Government to a Calgary law firm for which her former husband was a partner while she was Minister of Justice. The report affirmed the concern that had been raised by the opposition that Mr. Wilkinson had not had necessary information available to him in reaching the decision, particularly his being refused access to an Alberta Justice briefing note that listed the law firm as the last of three that should be considered.

On October 3, 2018, Iacobucci was appointed by Prime Minister Justin Trudeau to the position of special envoy for the controversial Trans Mountain Pipeline expansion. In February / March 2019 media reports noted that Iacobucci had been retained by SNC-Lavalin, concurrent with the company's controversial efforts to secure a Deferred Prosecution Agreement to avoid a trial for allegedly bribing Saadi Gaddafi to win engineering and construction contracts in Libya, before the fall of the Gaddafi regime in 2011.

Currently, he is a member of the board of directors with COSTI Immigration Services and has been since 2009.

== Honorary degrees and other awards ==
Iacobucci was appointed a Queen's Counsel, which changed to King's Counsel automatically upon the death of Queen Elizabeth II and the accession of King Charles III on 8 September 2022.

Iacobucci has received numerous awards, medals, honours, and other recognition from across Canada and from organizations in the United States, the United Kingdom and Italy.

He was made an Honorary Fellow of St John's College and Honorary Fellow of the American College of Trial Lawyers in 1999.

Iacobucci has been given honorary degrees from a number of renowned institutions of higher learning, including: University of Toronto (1989), University of British Columbia (1989), University of Ottawa (1995), University of Victoria (1996), Law Society of Upper Canada (2000), McGill University (2003), Università della Calabria (2003), University of Waterloo (2003), Queen's University (2005), York University (2005), University of Trinity College in the University of Toronto (2005), McMaster University (2008), University of Western Ontario (2009), Lakehead University (2014), Victoria University in the University of Toronto (2015), Cape Breton University (2016), Ryerson University (2017), and University of Ontario Institute of Technology (2018).

He has been honoured by several prominent Italian/Italian-Canadian entities for his contributions to the community. The Confratellanza Italo-Canadese presented him with the Italo-Canadian of the Year Award in 1985. In the same year, he was named Man of the Year by the Canadian-Italian Business and Professional Association of Toronto. The National Congress of Italian Canadians awarded him the Ordine al Merito in 1989.

In 1993, he received the Commendatore dell'Ordine Al Merito della Repubblica Italiana, the highest honour presented by the Italian Republic. He was also awarded the Medaglia d'Argento del Presidente della Repubblica Italiana in 2000. In Montreal, the Ordre des Fils d'Italie au Canada granted Iacobucci the Lion d'Or Award in 1995. That same year, the Federation of Clubs Cosentini of Ontario presented him with the Cosentino dell'Anno Award. Iacobucci also acquired the Canadian-Italian National Award back in the year 2000. He was granted the Premio Italia nel Mondo/Italy in the World Award the following year. In 2002, he was presented with the Valigia d'Oro Award.

Iacobucci was given Honorary Citizenship to municipalities: Magone, Cosenza (1996) and Cepegatti, Pescara (2001), both located in Italy.

The fraternity of Phi Gamma Delta presented him with the Distinguished Fiji Award in 1987.

On behalf of the Governor General of Canada, Iacobucci was awarded the 125th Anniversary of the Confederation of Canada Medal in 1992.

The Brotherhood Interfaith Society named him Man of the Year in 1999.

The Frank Iacobucci Centre for Italian Canadian Studies at the University of Toronto was named in his honour.

In 2002, he was awarded the Queen Elizabeth II Golden Jubilee Medal.

In 2007, he was made a Companion of the Order of Canada. In the same year, and then again in February 2017, Iacobucci held the James R. Bullock Visiting Chair in Canadian Studies, which enhances the field of Canadian Studies at the Hebrew University of Jerusalem and in Israel. He then met with academic leaders, professors, and students of the Hebrew University and of Tel Aviv University.

In 2009, Iacobucci received a star on the Italian Walk of Fame in Toronto, Ontario, Canada. On October 2, 2009, he was awarded the Justice Medal for lifetime achievement from the Canadian Institute for the Administration of Justice.

In 2012, Iacobucci was honoured with the Queen Elizabeth II Diamond Jubilee Medal.

Additionally, he was appointed an Honorary Witness by the Truth and Reconciliation Commission of Canada in April 2014.

== Personal life ==
Iacobucci met Harvard-educated lawyer Nancy Elizabeth Eastham while they were both at Cambridge. The couple married on October 31, 1964 and have three children: Andrew, Edward Iacobucci (also a Professor of Law at the University of Toronto) and Catherine. The couple also have eight grandchildren.

== See also ==
- Reasons of the Supreme Court of Canada by Justice Iacobucci
