= Edward Iacobucci =

Canadian legal scholar (born 1968)

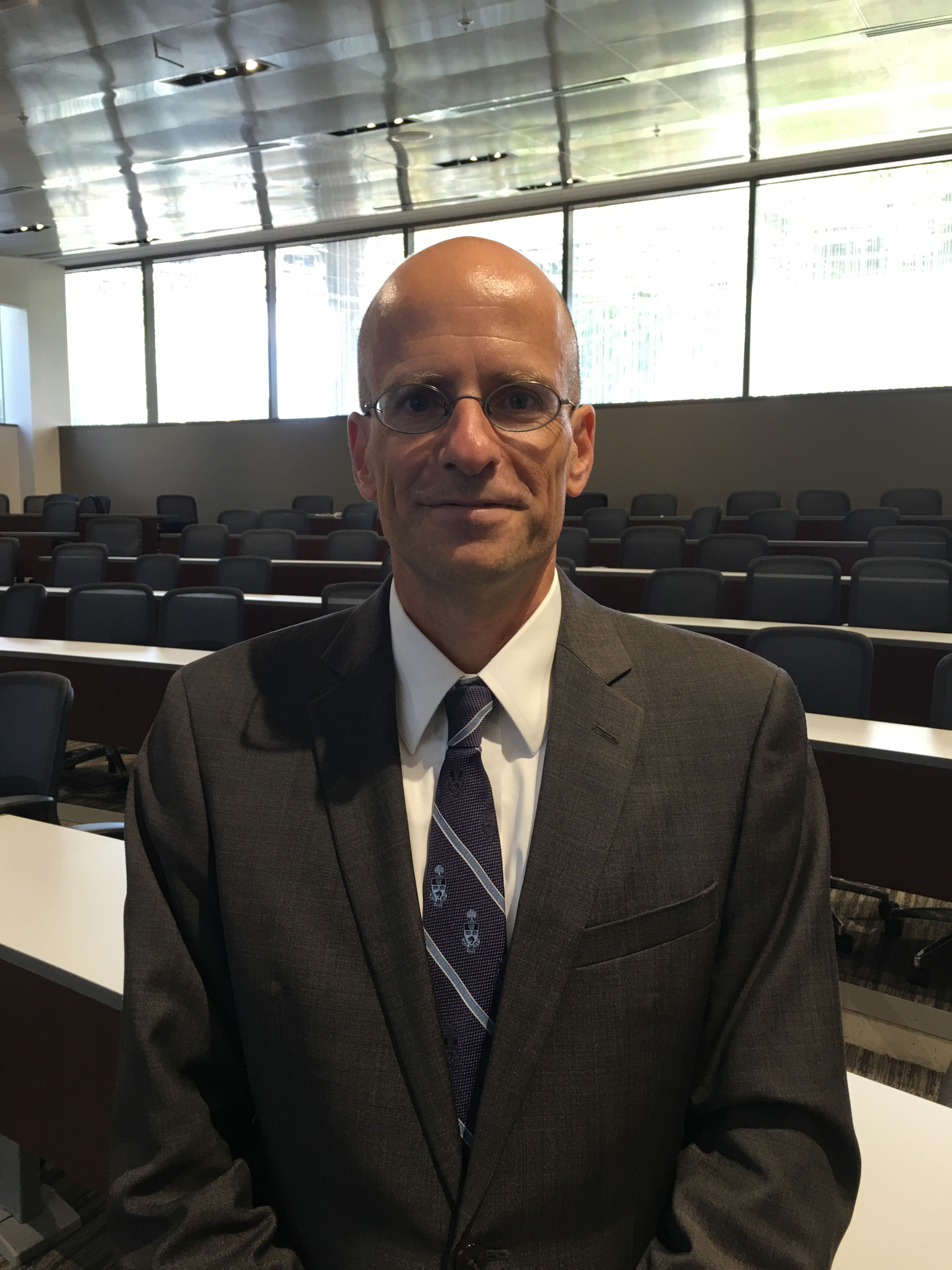
- Dean Edward Iacobucci in August 2016

10th Dean of the University of Toronto Faculty of Law
- In office January 1, 2015 – December 31, 2020
- Preceded by: Mayo Moran; Jutta Brunnée (interim)
- Succeeded by: Jutta Brunnée

Personal details
- Parent: Frank Iacobucci (father)
- Education: Queen's University (BA); St. John's College, Oxford (MPhil); University of Toronto (LLB)
- Profession: Lawyer; University administrator

Edward Michael Iacobucci (born October 6, 1968) is a Canadian legal academic and judge who is a former dean of the University of Toronto Faculty of Law, where he is also the James M. Tory Professor of Law. Before taking over from interim dean Jutta Brunnée on January 1, 2015, for a five-year term, he was a professor in the faculty, the faculty's associate dean of research, and the Osler Chair in Business Law. His primary research areas are corporate law, competition law, and the intersection of economics and the law.

== Early life and career ==
Edward Iacobucci is the son of Frank Iacobucci, a former puisne justice on the Supreme Court of Canada who was dean of the University of Toronto Faculty of Law from 1979 to 1983. Iacobucci earned a bachelor's degree (honours) in economics from Queen's University, a Master of Philosophy degree, also in economics, from the University of Oxford as a Rhodes Scholar, and a Bachelor of Laws from the University of Toronto. From 1996 to 1997, he clerked for John Sopinka, a justice of the Supreme Court of Canada.

== Academic career ==
Iacobucci joined the University of Toronto Faculty of Law in 1998. In 2002, he was a John M. Olin visiting fellow at Columbia University Law School. He has also been a visiting professor at New York University Law School and the University of Chicago Law School.

In 2003, Iacobucci, along with Paul Collins, Michael Trebilock, and Ralph Winter won the Canadian Economics Association's Doug Purvis Memorial Prize for their book The Law and Economics of Canadian Competition Policy.

In 2011, Iacobucci was appointed as the C. D. Howe Institute's Competition Policy Scholar, and was reappointed to that position in 2015. Iacobucci, along with Lawson Hunter and Michael Trebilcock were co-authors in a 2014 C.D. Howe Institute study called "Let the Market Decide: The Case against Mandatory Pick-And-Pay" about the Canadian telecommunications and broadcasting industry.

In 2016, during Iacobucci's tenure as dean, the University of Toronto Faculty of Law created the J.R. Kimber Chair for Investment Rights, which was the first research chair for investor rights in North America; the position was first held by future federal cabinet minister Anita Anand.

Iacobucci is an independent member of the Investment Industry Regulatory Organization of Canada (IIROC)'s board of directors and the chair of its Corporate Governance Committee.

Mid-September 2020 articles in the Toronto Star and The Globe and Mail —based on interviews and corroborated by correspondence between the university and faculty staff—alleged that Iacobucci had rescinded an offer to legal scholar Valentina Azarova to become the director of the faculty's International Human Rights Program (IHRP), under pressure from Justice David Spiro, a member of the Tax Court of Canada, who is an alumnus of and donor to the university. According to the Star, Azarova—who was the faculty advisory board's "unanimous choice"—had accepted the offer of the IHRP directorship in mid-August. In a mid-September letter to Iacobucci, two former IHRP directors, told the dean, that the Tax Court judge had expressed his concerns about Azarova's research on Israeli occupation—specifically her criticism of Israel's settlements in Palestine—to the administration. Shortly after, Azarova's offer was rescinded. A University of Haifa Faculty of Law associate professor, said that Azarova's criticism of Israel and the settlements was not "exotic", but rather a "kind of majority position around the world"—a "long-standing criticism" of "human rights violations of international law". In protest, the entire advisory board resigned en masse. In an October 14 email, Dean Iacobucci told professors that he had ordered an impartial review of the hiring process which will result in a January 2021 report. The announcement came amid calls from "lawyers, academics, rights groups and public intellectuals from around the world" for an independent review. The Canadian Judicial Council is "considering multiple complaints" against Justice Spiro. According to the Globe and Mail, Justice Spiro and his extended family, including the Tanenbaum's, have been generous donors over the years to the university. Dean Iacobucci denies any wrongdoing and says the reason for rescinding the offer to Azarova was related to an immigration technicality. The pro-Israel B'nai Brith Canada's CEO, Michael Mostyn said that preventing Azarova hiring was a "sound decision." The Canadian Association of University Teachers (CAUT) voted to censure the University of Toronto in protest of the external interference on academic freedom. The censure requested academics not to accept job offers or attend conferences and events at the university until Dr. Azarova's offer was reinstated. As a result of the censure, several events at the university were cancelled or postponed, including the University of Toronto TEDx conference. Groups that support the censure include Amnesty International, the National Lawyers Guild, the Indigenous Education Network, and the HIV Legal Network. As a result of the censure, the university re-offered the position to Azarova, which she then declined.

In December 2020, the Faculty of Law announced that Jutta Brunnée would succeed Iacobucci as dean, starting January 2021.
