= Kent Roach =

Canadian legal scholar

Kent Roach CM
- Title: Professor & Prichard Wilson Chair in Law and Public Policy

Academic background
- Education: University of Toronto (BA, LLB); Yale Law School (LLM)

Academic work
- Discipline: Canadian law
- Sub-discipline: Constitutional law, Criminal law, Anti-terrorism law
- Website: http://www.law.utoronto.ca/faculty-staff/full-time-faculty/kent-roach

Kent Roach CM is a professor of law at the University of Toronto Faculty of Law. He is well known for his expertise and writings on criminal law, the Canadian Charter of Rights and Freedoms, and more recently anti-terrorism law. He is a graduate of the university and served as a law clerk to Justice Bertha Wilson of the Supreme Court of Canada. Roach is a recipient of the Pierre Elliott Trudeau Foundation Fellowship (2013). He was appointed a Member of the Order of Canada in 2015.

== Career ==
Roach studied political science as an undergraduate student in the 1980s at the University of Toronto. He studied under Peter H. Russell, the research director on the Royal Commission of Inquiry into Certain Activities of the RCMP, and completed his undergraduate thesis in 1984 on the then-newly created Canadian Security Intelligence Service.

Roach served as director of research for the public inquiry investigating Air India Flight 182 and was also on the research advisory committee for the inquiry on Maher Arar's case.

Professor Roach's current research involves the comparative study of miscarriages of justice, comparative judicial review and comparative anti-terrorism law and policy. He is the editor-in-chief of the Criminal Law Quarterly, and member of the advisory committee for both the Commission of Inquiry into the Actions of Canadian Officials in Relation to Maher Arar and the Ipperwash Inquiry into the killing of Dudley George.

His book Canadian Policing: Why and How It Must Change was a nominee for the 2022 Balsillie Prize for Public Policy.

== Select publications ==
- Canadian Justice, Indigenous Injustice: The Gerald Stanley and Colton Boushie Case. McGill University Press, 2019
- Criminal Law and Procedure: Cases and Materials Emond Montgomery Publications, 11th ed, 2015
- Criminal Law Irwin Law, 3rd ed, 2004
- Brian Dickson: A Judge's Journey University of Toronto Press, 2003 (with Robert Sharpe)
- The Supreme Court on Trial: Judicial Activism or Democratic Dialogue, Toronto, Irwin Law, 2001
