= Audrey Macklin =

Canadian legal scholar

Audrey Macklin is a Canadian scholar of immigration law and the Rebecca Cook Chair in Human Rights Law at the University of Toronto Faculty of Law. She is also the director of the University of Toronto's Centre for Criminology and Sociolegal Studies.

Macklin was a Pierre Elliott Trudeau Foundation fellow in 2017. As of 2020, she is a fellow of the Canadian Institute for Advanced Research.

Macklin received a BSc from the University of Alberta, an LLB from the University of Toronto Faculty of Law, and an LLM from Yale Law School. Before her academic career, Macklin clerked for Justice Bertha Wilson of the Supreme Court of Canada. Macklin was a professor at the Schulich School of Law at Dalhousie University from 1991 to 2000, when she was appointed to a position at the University of Toronto. In the mid-1990s, she was a member of the Immigration and Refugee Board of Canada.

In 2017, Macklin delivered testimony to a committee of the Senate of Canada regarding proposed amendments to the Citizenship Act. In 2019, she represented the University of Toronto Faculty of Law's International Human Rights Program before the Supreme Court of Canada in Nevsun Resources Ltd v Araya, a case involving the liability of a Canadian firm for alleged breaches of international law abroad.

== Selected publications ==
- Macklin, Audrey (1992). "Foreign Domestic Worker: Surrogate Housewife or Mail Order Servant?" (PDF). McGill Law Journal. 37 (3): 681–760. ISSN 0024-9041. SSRN 1629954.
- Macklin, Audrey (1995). "Refugee Women and the Imperative of Categories" (PDF). Human Rights Quarterly. 17 (2): 213–277. doi:10.1353/hrq.1995.0019. hdl:10315/6740. ISSN 1085-794X. JSTOR 762517. S2CID 144665816.
- Macklin, Audrey (December 23, 2005). "Disappearing Refugees: Reflections on the Canada–US Safe Third Country Agreement" (PDF). Columbia Human Rights Law Review. 36: 365–426. SSRN 871226.
- Simons, Penelope; Macklin, Audrey (July 11, 2014). The Governance Gap: Extractive Industries, Human Rights, and the Home State Advantage. Routledge. doi:10.4324/9780203417256. ISBN 978-0-203-41725-6.
- Aiken, Sharryn J.; Galloway, J. Donald C.; Grey, Colin; Macklin, Audrey (April 22, 2015). Migration Law in Canada (2nd ed.). Wolters Kluwer. ISBN 978-90-411-6013-3. OCLC 910930412.
