= Maureen Kempston Darkes =

Canadian lawyer and automotive executive

Vera Maureen Kempston Darkes
- Born: Vera Maureen Kempston; July 31, 1948 (age 77); Toronto, Ontario, Canada
- Occupation: Automotive executive
- Spouse: Lawrence J. Darkes
- Awards: Order of Canada; Order of Ontario

Vera Maureen Kempston Darkes, OC OOnt (born July 31, 1948) is a Canadian lawyer and automotive executive who was the General Motors Group Vice President; President, GM Latin America, Africa and Middle East; a member of the General Motors Automotive Strategy Board, since January 1, 2002; and held the highest operating post ever achieved by a woman at General Motors at the time (Mary Barra subsequently held several senior executive positions before becoming CEO of General Motors in January 2014).

Born in Toronto, Ontario, she received a Bachelor of Arts in history and political science from Victoria University in the University of Toronto in 1970. During this time she was a member of Delta Delta Delta sorority. She received a Bachelor of Laws degree from the University of Toronto Faculty of Law in 1973 and was called to the Bar of Ontario.

In 1975, she joined the legal staff of General Motors of Canada and she became assistant counsel in 1979. She rose to become general counsel and secretary of GM Canada in 1992. She was later appointed the first woman President and General Manager of General Motors of Canada. On July 24, 2009, it was announced that she will be retiring at the end of 2009.

She is a corporate director of Brookfield Asset Management, Canadian National Railway, Enbridge, and Schlumberger Limited.

== Honours ==
In 1997, she was awarded the Women's Automotive Association International (WAAI) Professional Achievement Award. In 1998, she was awarded the Order of Ontario and in 1999, she was made an Officer of the Order of Canada. In 2006, she was awarded the Governor General's Award in Commemoration of the Persons Case. She has received honorary degrees from the University of Toronto, University of Victoria, McMaster University, Dalhousie University, Wilfrid Laurier University, the Law Society of Upper Canada, and Saint Mary's University.

She was ranked by Fortune magazine in 2003 as the 6th "Most Powerful Women in International Business".

In 2009, she was ranked as one of Latin America's 100 Most Powerful Businesspeople by Latin Business Chronicle.
