= List of deans of the Henry N.R. Jackman Faculty of Law =

The Henry N.R. Jackman Faculty of Law (known simply as the Faculty of Law until 2025) has had 11 deans since it became a professional faculty of the University of Toronto in 1949.

== Deans ==
No.	Picture	Name	Took office	Left office
Dean of the Faculty of Law (1943–2025)
1		W. P. M. Kennedy	1943	1949
2		Cecil Wright	1949	1965
3		Ronald St. John Macdonald	1965	1972
4		Martin Friedland	1972	1979
5		Frank Iacobucci	1979	1983
6		Robert Prichard	1984	1990
7		Robert Sharpe	1990	1995
8		Ron Daniels	1995	2005
9		Mayo Moran	2006	2014
10		Edward Iacobucci	2015	2020
Dean of the Henry N.R. Jackman Faculty of Law (2025–present)
11		Jutta Brunnée	2021	2026
12		Christopher Essert	2026	(incumbent)

== See also ==
- Law school dean
