= Martha Jackman =

Canadian legal scholar

Martha Jackman FRSC is a professor of law at the University of Ottawa Faculty of Law. Her scholarship focuses on constitutional law.

Jackman received her JD from the University of Toronto Faculty of Law and an LLM from Yale Law School. In 2012, she delivered testimony to a committee of the Senate of Canada on the Charter implications of proposed amendments to the Criminal Code. She has been a member of the national steering committee of the National Association of Women and the Law since 2007.

Jackman was elected a Fellow of the Royal Society of Canada in 2017 and received the David Walter Mundell Medal from the government of Ontario in 2018 in recognition of her legal writing. In 2019 she was the academic recipient of the Guardians of Public Health Care awards through the Canadian Health Coalition.
