= Robert Prichard =

Canadian lawyer and economist; chairman of the Bank of Montréal

Robert Prichard OC OOnt

13th President of the University of Toronto
- In office 1990 – 2000
- Chancellor: John Black Aird; Rose Wolfe; Hal Jackman
- Preceded by: George Connell
- Succeeded by: Robert J. Birgeneau

6th Dean of the University of Toronto Faculty of Law
- In office 1984 – 1990
- Preceded by: Frank Iacobucci
- Succeeded by: Robert Sharpe

Personal details
- Born: 17 January 1949 (age 77) London, England
- Education: Swarthmore College (BA); University of Chicago (MBA); University of Toronto (LLB); Yale University (LLM)

Academic work
- Discipline: Law
- Institutions: University of Toronto

John Robert Stobo Prichard OC OOnt (born 17 January 1949) is a Canadian lawyer, economist, and academic. He is the past president and chief executive officer and former director of Torstar Corporation. He was previously chairman of the Bank of Montreal and the 13th president of the University of Toronto.

== Academia ==
Born in London, England, Prichard attended prep school at Upper Canada College. He studied economics as an undergraduate at Swarthmore College. He graduated with a bachelor's degree in 1971 and earned a Master of Business Administration (M.B.A.) at the University of Chicago that same year before receiving law degrees from the University of Toronto and Yale Law School.

Prichard joined the Faculty of Law at the University of Toronto in 1976. He served as dean of the faculty from 1984 to 1990.

Prichard was appointed the thirteenth president of the University of Toronto in 1990, a position which he held until 2000. During his ten years as president, the U of T's endowment rose to $1.4 billion, the most of any Canadian university.

== Toronto Star ==
Upon leaving the University of Toronto, Prichard became the president of the Star Media Group and chief operating officer of the Torstar Corporation in May 2001. In 2004, Prichard pushed out John Honderich as publisher of the Toronto Star because he resisted making the deep cost cuts that Prichard demanded. However, in 2006, Honderich, a Torstar director who chairs a voting trust comprising five families that control Torstar, instigated a "coup" among the five families that resulted in the termination of Prichard's chosen publisher Michael Goldbloom and editor-in-chief Giles Gherson. Some have suggested that Torstar's financial woes have been caused by Prichard's distraction by his presence on several boards, including Onex and Four Seasons.

Prichard has also been a member of Imasco's board of directors since 1993. Imasco owns and controls Imperial Tobacco, the largest tobacco manufacturer in Canada. Prichard's involvement with Imasco was the subject of criticism, due to a perceived conflict of interest for his role as university head. During Prichard's term as president, the University of Toronto accepted $2 million from Imasco between 1997 and 1999. In 1998, Imasco contributed just over $2.5 million to educational institutions across the country. Similar conflict of interest concerns have been raised about the 2005 deal engineered by Prichard by which Torstar acquired a 20 per cent stake in broadcaster and rival publisher Bell Globemedia Inc.

== Political work ==
Prichard served on the transition teams of three Ontario premiers of three different parties: Liberal David Peterson in 1985, New Democrat Bob Rae in 1990, and Progressive Conservative Mike Harris in 1995.

Prichard was deemed by several political insiders to be a contender in the race to become Liberal Party Leader, following the resignation of former Prime Minister Paul Martin.

== Business career ==
Prichard is past president and chief executive officer and former director of Torstar Corporation, and also sits on the boards of George Weston Limited, Onex Corporation, and is the chairman of the board of the Bank of Montreal.

== Current work ==
Prichard is the chair of the board of Alto and Penguin Group Canada, as well as the chair of Toronto law firm Torys LLP.

Business positions
Preceded by	Torstar Corporation CEO	Succeeded by
