= William R. Brody =

American radiologist and academic administrator

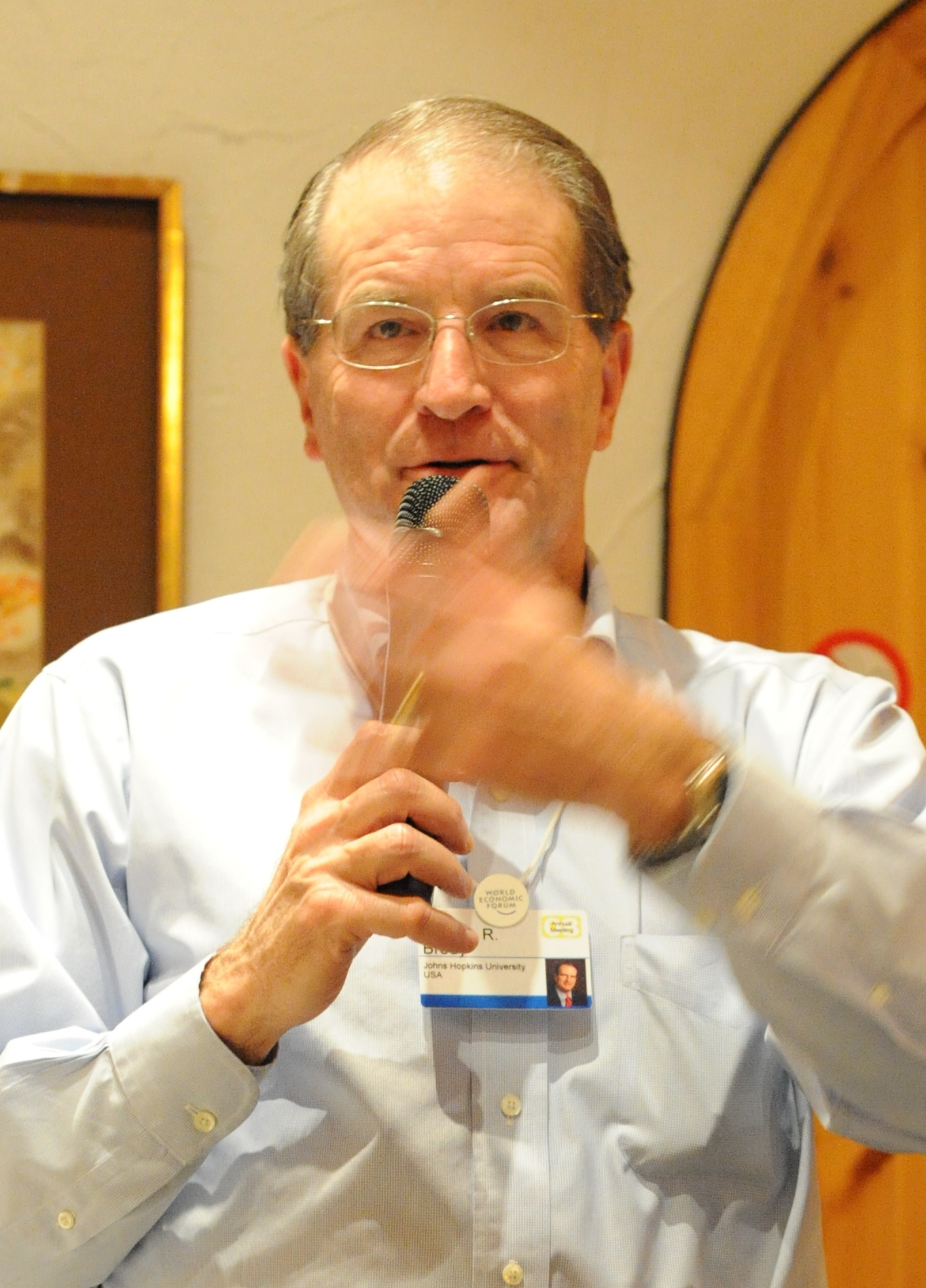
- Brody in 2008

13th President of the Johns Hopkins University
- In office 1996 – March 3, 2008
- Preceded by: Daniel Nathans
- Succeeded by: Ronald J. Daniels

Personal details
- Born: January 4, 1944 (age 82) Stockton, California, U.S.
- Spouse: Hyunah Yu Brody (2019-present)
- Children: 2
- Education: Massachusetts Institute of Technology (BS, MS); Stanford University (MD, PhD)

William Ralph Brody (born January 4, 1944) is an American radiologist and academic administrator. He was the President of The Johns Hopkins University, a position which he held from 1996 to 2009 before becoming the President of the Salk Institute from 2009 to 2015.

== Education ==
Brody attended the Massachusetts Institute of Technology where he studied electrical engineering, earning both a B.S. and a M.S. degree. He then received his M.D. and electrical engineering Ph.D. degrees from Stanford University. After obtaining these degrees, Brody worked as a resident in the Department of Cardiovascular Surgery from 1972 to 1973. He then was a clinical associate at the National Heart, Lung and Blood Institute in the surgery branch from 1973 to 1975 before serving as a resident at the University of California, San Francisco in the Radiology Department from 1975 to 1977.

== Career ==
=== Professorships ===
From 1977 to 1986, Brody was employed at the Stanford University School of Medicine. He began as an associate professor before advancing to hold titles including professor of radiology and electrical engineering, director of the Advanced Imaging Techniques Laboratory, and director of Research Laboratories - Division of Diagnostic Radiology.

Brody then shifted to the Johns Hopkins University School of Medicine in 1987. He served as the Martin W. Donner Professor of Radiology, professor of biomedical engineering, professor of electrical and computer engineering, and radiologist-in-chief of The Johns Hopkins Hospital.

=== Administration ===
Brody served as provost of the Academic Health Center at the University of Minnesota for two years prior to becoming Johns Hopkins University's thirteenth president in 1996. He was the highest-paid university president in the United States, receiving $897,786 in 2004, and regained the title in 2007. On March 10, 2008, he announced his intent to step down as president effective December 31, 2008. This was postponed to March 3, 2009, upon Hopkins naming Ronald Daniels, the provost of the University of Pennsylvania its next president. In 2008, Brody became president of Salk Institute, a position he would hold until 2015. On May 21, 2009, an honorary doctorate was conferred on him by The Johns Hopkins University.

=== Entrepreneurship ===
In addition to teaching and being an administrator, Brody took on personal scientific efforts of his own. He is a co-founder of several medical device companies including Biopsys Medical (Acquired by J&J), Resonex (acquired by GE), and Commure. He also continued his studies in radiology, specifically in the field of medical imaging, in which he has authored over 100 publications. He has patents in this field for a multiple-energy x-ray subtraction imaging system (for which he is the sole inventor) and multiple simulation systems (which he shares with James H. Anderson, Chee-Kong Chui, Yiyu Cai, Yaoping Wang, and Wieslaw L. Nowinski).

=== Other Activity ===
Brody has been on the Board of Directors of a variety of organizations. These include IBM, Alza Pharmaceuticals (J&J), Medtronic, and Mesa Biotech. He also served on the Science Board of the Food and Drug Administration, the President's Foreign Intelligence Advisory Board and is a member of the Stanford University Board of Trustees.

In 2007, Brody became a member of the National Academy of Engineering for contributions to digital radiography, and for leadership in engineering at the interface between academia and industry.

== Personal life ==
With his former wife, Wendy, he has two children: Ingrid and John. Brody is also a certified commercial pilot and flight instructor.

== Legacy ==
=== Brody Learning Commons ===
The Brody Learning Commons was officially opened in August 2012. This building is a connection to Johns Hopkins University's already existing Milton S. Eisenhower Library and it was named in the honor of former university president William R. Brody and his wife, Wendy. Opening this new study space left Brody with a strong connection to the university. Brody and his wife, Wendy, stated: “We always considered ourselves very lucky to have such smart, talented young people as our neighbors. Having a place where students will gather to study and learn named after us feels like we get to keep a piece of Hopkins with us forever.”

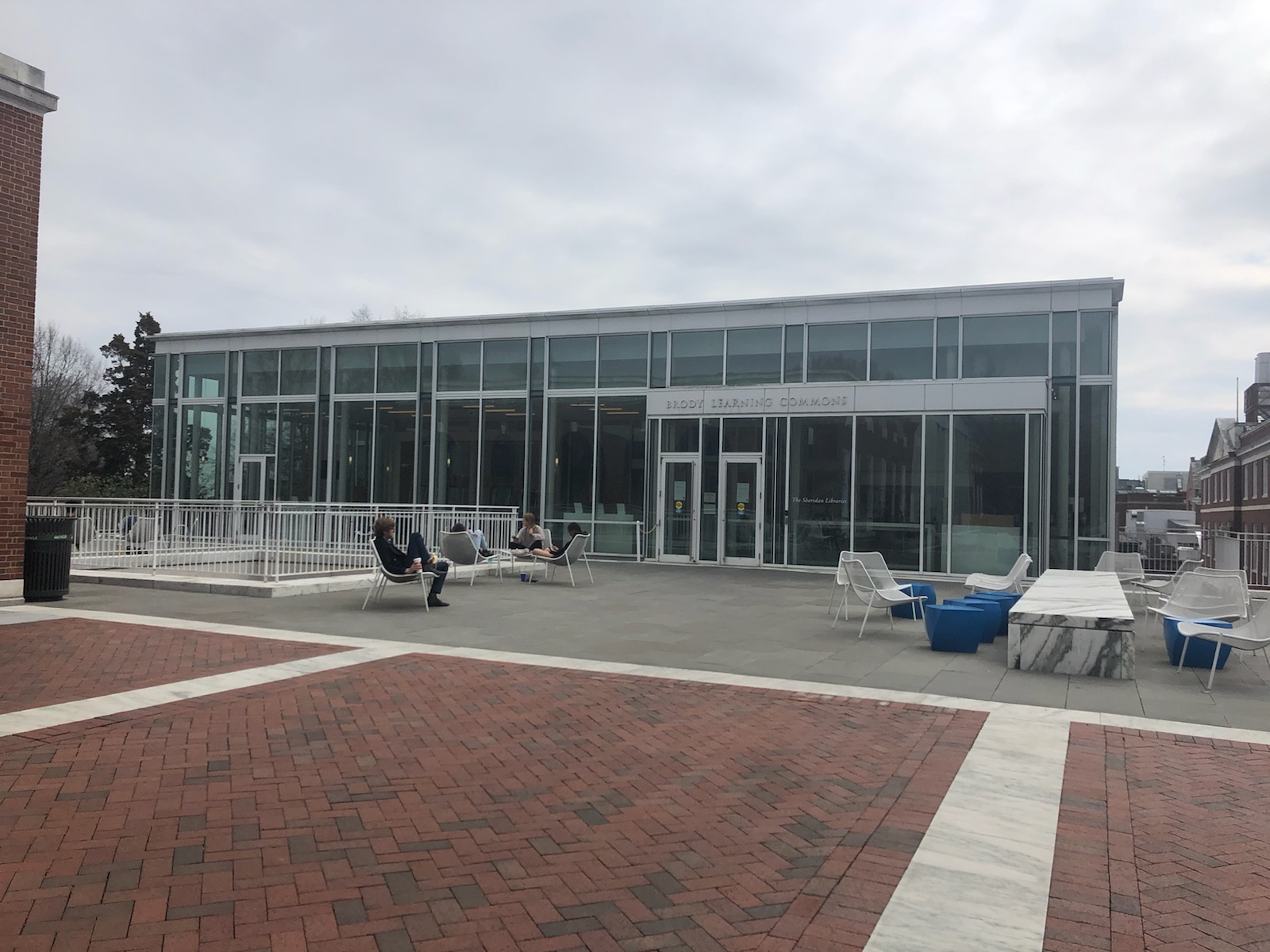
This is the outside of the Brody Learning Commons at the Homewood Campus of The Johns Hopkins University.

The building has several features: floor to ceiling glass walls, an architectural design desired by surveyed students and faculty. The building contains several collaborative study rooms that can be reserved by groups of students. These rooms contain projectors and white-board walls and are located within the multiple levels of the library, levels A, B, C, and D, with the main atrium in between. The building is also equipped with a reading room, sitting 100 students, six seminar rooms, and a café, as well as the Milton S. Eisenhower's special collections department. This department provides students and faculty direct interaction with preserved sources and artifacts to use for research or personal observation.

This attachment to the library has allowed room for more than a third of the existing seating capacity. Additionally, the building features various interactive forms of technology, ranging from projectors to video equipment for student use.

== Awards and honors ==
Brody is a member of the Institute of Electrical and Electronics Engineers (IEEE), the Academy of Arts and Sciences, the International Society of Magnetic Resonance in Medicine, the American College of Cardiology, the American College of Radiology, the American Institute of Biomedical Engineering, the Institute of Medicine of the National Academy of Sciences, the National Academy of Engineering and the American Heart Association.

Brody has received awards for his work in the field of biomedical engineering and radiology including the American Academy of Arts and Sciences Presidential Medal and Stanford Medical School Distinguished Alumnus Award. In addition, he was awarded the Gold Medal of the Radiological Society of North America in 2010 for his work in the science of medical imaging.
