= List of provosts of Trinity College, Toronto =

This is a list of provosts of Trinity College, a federated university in the University of Toronto. At Trinity College, the provost and vice-chancellor is the senior academic administrator and is also the university's chief executive and officer of advancement.

== Provosts ==
- 1851-1881: George Whitaker
- 1881-1894: Charles W. E. Body
- 1895-1899: Edward A. Welch
- 1900-1921: Thomas C. S. Macklem
- 1921-1926: Charles A. Seager
- 1926-1945: Francis H. Cosgrave
- 1945-1957: Reginald S. K. Seeley
- 1957-1972: Derwyn R. G. Owen
- 1972-1978: George Ignatieff
- 1979-1986: F. Kenneth Hare
- 1986-1996: Robert H. Painter
- 1996-2002: William Thomas Delworth
- 2002-2007: Margaret MacMillan
- 2007-2013: Andy Orchard
- 2014–2024: Mayo Moran
- 2024–Present: Nicholas Terpstra
