= Brenda Cossman =

Canadian jurist and academic

Brenda Cossman FRSC (born 1960) is a professor of law at the University of Toronto. She was the director at the Mark S. Bonham Centre for Sexual Diversity Studies from 2009 to 2018. In 2012, Cossman was named a Fellow of the Royal Society of Canada.

== Education and career ==
Cossman holds degrees in law from Harvard and the University of Toronto, and an undergraduate degree from Queen's University. In 2002 and 2003, she was a visiting professor of law at Harvard Law School. Prior to joining the University of Toronto, she was associate professor at Osgoode Hall Law School of York University. Her teaching and research is in the area of family law, feminist theory, law and film, and sexuality and the law.

She is actively involved in law reform, particularly in the area of same sex couples and definitions of family. She authored reports for the Law Commission of Canada as well as the Ontario Law Reform Commission on the legal regulation of adult relationships.

Cossman is also a frequent commentator in the media on issues relating to law and sexuality, most frequently for The Globe and Mail and the CBC. She is prominently featured as a commentator in John Greyson's CBC documentary After the Bath (1996) about the London sex scandal. She also served as a member of the Pink Triangle Press Board of Directors for 10 years, working as a frequent contributor to their main publication, Xtra!

== Selected publications ==
- Cossman, Brenda (1995). Censorship and the Arts: Law, Controversy, Debate, Facts. Ontario Association of Art Galleries. ISBN 978-0-969-49879-7.
- Cossman, Brenda; Bell, Shannon; Gotell, Lise; Ross, Becki L. (1997). Bad Attitudes on Trial: Pornography, Feminism and the Butler Decision. University of Toronto Press. ISBN 978-0-802-07643-4.
- Kapur, Ratna; Cossman, Brenda (1996). Subversive Sites: Feminist Engagements with Law in India. SAGE Publications. ISBN 978-0-803-99315-0.
- Kapur, Ratna; Cossman, Brenda (2001). Secularism's Last Sigh? Hindutva and the (mis)rule of Law. Oxford University Press. ISBN 978-0-195-65798-2.
- Cossman, Brenda; Fudge, Judy, eds. (2002). Privatization, Law, and the Challenge to Feminism. University of Toronto Press. ISBN 978-0-802-08509-2.
- Cossman, Brenda (2007). Sexual Citizens: The Legal and Cultural Regulation of Sex and Belonging. Stanford University Press. ISBN 0-804-74996-5.
- Cossman, Brenda (2021). The New Sex Wars: Sexual Harm in the #Metoo Era. New York University Press. ISBN 978-1-479-80270-8.
- Fischel, Joseph J.; Cossman, Brenda, eds. (2024). Enticements: Queer Legal Studies. NYU Press. ISBN 978-1-479-80759-8.
- Jutta Brunnée, Jutta; Cossman, Brenda; Green, Andrew; Alarie, Benjamin (2025). Law in a Changing World: The Climate Crisis. University of Toronto Press. ISBN 978-1-487-56334-9.
