= Robert Sharpe (judge) =

Canadian jurist

Robert James Sharpe

7th Dean of the University of Toronto Faculty of Law
- In office 1990–1995
- Preceded by: Robert Prichard
- Succeeded by: Ron Daniels

Personal details
- Born: December 4, 1945 (age 80) Brantford, Ontario
- Known for: Judge of the Court of Appeal for Ontario

Robert James Sharpe, OC, FRSC (born December 4, 1945) is a Canadian lawyer, author, academic, and judge. He was dean of the University of Toronto Faculty of Law from 1990 to 1995 and a judge of the Court of Appeal for Ontario from 1999 to 2020.

== Early life ==
Robert James Sharpe was born on December 4, 1945, in Brantford, Ontario, to Eleanor Jane (Cooper) and Ira Sutherland Sharpe. He received a Bachelor of Arts from the University of Western Ontario in 1966, a Bachelor of Laws from the University of Toronto in 1970, and a DPhil from the University of Oxford in 1974.

== Legal career ==
He was called to the bar of Ontario in 1974 and practised law with the firm of MacKinnon, McTaggart (later McTaggart, Potts, Stone & Herridge) in the area of civil litigation. He taught at the University of Toronto Faculty of Law from 1976 to 1988. From 1988 to 1990, he was the Executive Legal Officer at the Supreme Court of Canada under Chief Justice Brian Dickson. From 1990 to 1995, he was the Dean of the University of Toronto Faculty of Law. In 1995, he was appointed to the Ontario Court of Justice (General Division) (now the Superior Court of Justice). In 1999, he was appointed to the Court of Appeal for Ontario. From 2011 to 2021, he was Visiting Professor at the University of Oxford. Sharpe retired from the judiciary on February 28, 2020.

After leaving the bench, he joined Arbitration Place and rejoined the University of Toronto Faculty of Law as Distinguished Jurist in Residence. He was President of the Canadian Institute for Advanced Legal Studies from 2014 to 2020, and is currently the President of the Osgoode Society for Legal History.

=== Selected works ===
- The Law of Habeas Corpus (1976)
- Injunctions and Specific Performance (1983) (Canadian Bar Association’s Walter Owen Book Prize) (5th ed, 2017)
- Charter Litigation (1987) (Editor)
- The Last Day, The Last Hour: The Currie Libel Trial (1988)
- The Charter of Rights and Freedoms (with Kent Roach) (7th ed 2021)
- Brian Dickson: A Judge’s Journey (with Kent Roach) (2003) (John Wesley Dafoe Prize)
- The Persons Case: The Origins and Legacy of the Fight for Legal Personhood (with Patricia McMahon) (2007) (Canadian Law and Society Book Prize)
- The Lazier Murder: Prince Edward County, 1884 (2011) (Ontario Historical Association Fred Landon Book Prize)
- Good Judgment: Making Judicial Decisions (2018)

=== Notable judgments ===
In 2001, Robert Sharpe wrote the reasons of the Ontario Court of Appeal that recognized the distinctive legal rights of Métis people.

In November 2007, the Toronto Star reported that "In a decision [written by Justice Sharpe on behalf of a panel comprising himself and Justices Karen Weiler and Robert Blair] described as a major breakthrough for freedom of the press in Canada, the [Ontario Court of Appeal] chiselled out what it calls a "new and distinctive" defence for journalists reporting on matters of public significance.

In 2012, he wrote the Ontario Court of Appeal's decision that established the right to sue for invasion of privacy.

== Honours and awards ==
Sharpe was elected a fellow of the Royal Society of Canada in 1991. He was awarded the Ontario Bar Association Distinguished Service Award in 2005, and in 2008 he was awarded the Mundell Medal which celebrates excellence in legal writing by Ontario authors who have made a distinguished contribution to law and letters.

In 2021, he received honorary doctorate degrees from the Law Society of Ontario and the University of Windsor. And in 2020 he was recognized with a Distinguished Alumni Award from the University of Toronto Faculty of Law.

Sharpe was appointed to the Order of Canada in June 2023, with the rank of Officer.
