= Ron Daniels (academic) =

Canadian academic

Ronald Daniels CM
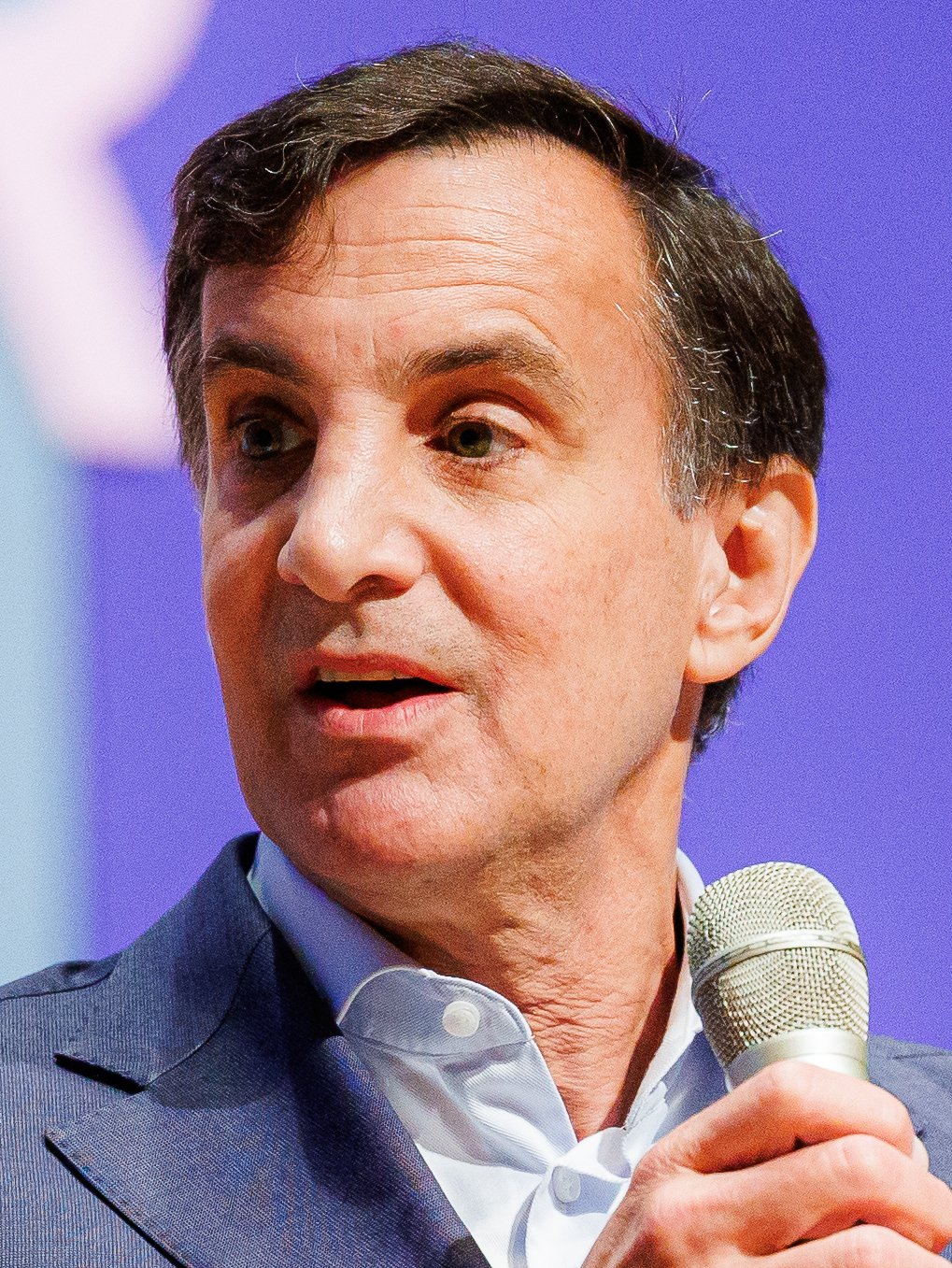
- Daniels in 2024

14th President of Johns Hopkins University
- Incumbent
- Assumed office March 2, 2009
- Preceded by: William R. Brody

Provost of University of Pennsylvania
- In office July 2005 – February 2009
- Preceded by: Peter J. Conn
- Succeeded by: Vincent Price

8th Dean of the University of Toronto Faculty of Law
- In office 1995–2005
- Preceded by: Robert Sharpe
- Succeeded by: Mayo Moran

Personal details
- Born: 1959 (age 66–67) Toronto, Ontario, Canada
- Spouse: Joanne Rosen
- Education: University of Toronto (BA, JD); Yale University (LLM)
- Awards: Order of Canada (member)

Ronald Joel Daniels CM (born 1959) is a Canadian-American jurist, currently serving as the 14th president of the Johns Hopkins University since 2009. He served as dean of the Faculty of Law at the University of Toronto from 1995 to 2005 and provost at the University of Pennsylvania from 2005 to 2009.

== Education ==
Daniels received a Bachelor of Arts in 1982 and a Juris Doctor in 1986, both from the University of Toronto. He received a Master of Laws from Yale University in 1988.

== Career ==
=== Professorship ===
Daniels was provost and professor of law at the University of Pennsylvania and dean and James M. Tory Professor of Law at the University of Toronto, where he was editor in chief of the University of Toronto Faculty of Law Review. He was also a visiting professor and Coca-Cola World Fellow at Yale Law School, as well as a John M. Olin Visiting Fellow at Cornell Law School. He received a Carnegie Corporation of New York Academic Leadership Award in 2015.

=== Advisory roles for the Canadian government ===
He has advised several Canadian governments on a range of policy issues, including chairing the Ontario Panel of the Future of Government, the Market Design Committee (defining market structure of new competitive electricity markets in Ontario), and the Ontario Government Task Force on Securities Regulation and the Reform of Accounting Standards; he also served on the Toronto Stock Exchange Committee on Corporate Governance in Canada.

=== Johns Hopkins University ===
Since March 1, 2009, Daniels has served as the 14th president of The Johns Hopkins University. As president, Daniels has continued the university's 38-year legacy of having the most federal research funding in the country. Daniels is among the highest-paid university presidents with a total annual pay of approximately $3.6 million. In 2013, Daniels announced the creation of "Ten by Twenty", the university's first comprehensive strategic plan, setting goals for the school through 2020. His Rising to the Challenge campaign, costing $6 billion and ending in 2018, emphasized Daniels' three overarching themes - increasing interdisciplinary collaborative research and innovation, enhancing individual student excellence, and larger social involvement within the Baltimore community. In March 2015, Daniels released the first Ten by Twenty progress report. At the same time, he announced the launch of the Johns Hopkins Idea Lab, a source of crowdsourcing initiatives from the Johns Hopkins community. The Idea Lab was inspired by the Johns Hopkins Applied Physics Laboratory's Ignition Grants. Winners of the Idea Lab competition win $20,000 to support their initiative.

Daniels serves as the chair of the executive committee of Johns Hopkins Medicine – the entity linking the Johns Hopkins Health System and the university's School of Medicine. He has worked closely with health system leadership through several strategic acquisitions and partnerships across health-related industry sectors.

Daniels has made attempts to strengthen Johns Hopkins' ties to Baltimore with programs such as HopkinsLocal, which hired hundreds of employees from within economically deprived neighborhoods in the city. The university has partnered with several city schools, and helped create the Henderson-Hopkins elementary/middle school, the first new school in East Baltimore built in 20 years. Daniels also secured funding for the renovation of the historic Parkway Theater in the Station North area of the city.

==== Initiatives ====
Daniels has begun several initiatives focusing on interdisciplinary research and innovation; including the Johns Hopkins Precision Medicine Analytics Platform (PMAP), the Bloomberg-Kimmel Institute for Cancer Immunotherapy, and the recently announced partnership among the Johns Hopkins University School of Medicine, Bloomberg Philanthropies, and The New York Stem Cell Foundation Research Institute. Throughout his time at Johns Hopkins, Daniels has also founded the Henry A. Kissinger Center for Global Affairs, the William H. Miller Department of Philosophy, the Bloomberg American Health Initiative, and the Bloomberg Distinguished Professorship. The Bloomberg Distinguished Professors program recruits 50 scholars from around the world who are experts in their field to hold joint appointments in two or more departments of the university. In addition, Daniels founded the Stavros Niarchos Foundation Agora Institute which aims to discuss the need for universities to play a larger role in teaching students how to properly uphold their democratic duties, and increase the emphasis on civic education engagement and dialogue.

Another focus of Daniels' has been in strengthening the graduate, specifically PhD programs, at the university. Under the Gateway Science Initiative, Daniels established the first university-wide board to advocate for and support PhD programs. Furthermore, Daniels has created a PhD innovation fund, as well as a movement to collect and analyze data on PhD program performance.

==== Financial aid efforts ====
In a U.S. News article, Daniels stated that Johns Hopkins would "open [its] doors not to students whose parents can cut the check, but to those who can do the work and benefit from the opportunities we offer". He maintains that the cost of college should not be a deciding factor in receiving a proper liberal arts education, and that it is the duty of the institution, whether it be a private or public university, to ensure that. For the past decade, he has roughly increased the financial aid budget of the school by 10 percent each year. In 2017, he and his wife Joanne Rosen have announced the founding of the Daniels–Rosen First Generation Scholars Fund for Johns Hopkins undergraduates, which is a $1 million endowment for those who are the first in their families to attend college.

==== Need-blind and legacy policies ====
To further champion his efforts in reducing barriers for minorities and kids from poorer communities, Daniels has switched the admissions process of the university to become need-blind and not consider legacy, because "legacy students at these schools are more likely to be wealthy and white than non-legacy students, the very existence of legacy preferences limits access for high-achieving low- and middle-income students, and also for African American, Latino, and Native American students".

=== Honors ===
In December 2016, Daniels was invested into the Order of Canada at the grade of Member. He was elected to the American Philosophical Society in 2018 and is also a member of the American Academy of Arts & Sciences.

In 2014, Daniels was awarded degree Doctor of Laws, honoris causa, at the University of Toronto.

=== Affiliations ===
Daniels is a member of the Board of Directors of BridgeBio Pharma Inc.

In 2018, Daniels served as the congressional chair of the Committee on The Next Generation Initiative of the National Academies of Sciences, Engineering and Medicine.

In 2022, Daniels was named the chair of the Israel Democracy Institute's International Advisory Council.

== Criticism ==
=== East Baltimore Development Initiative ===
One of Daniels' major initiatives has been the controversial $1.8 billion, 88-acre East Baltimore Development Initiative (EBDI), a redevelopment of the Middle East neighborhood, adjacent to Hopkins' downtown hospital campus. Alluding to the central importance of the project to his presidency, Daniels said "If EBDI fails, then my presidency at Hopkins fails." The redevelopment has been praised by some in Baltimore, and counts as partners the State of Maryland, the City of Baltimore, the Annie E. Casey Foundation, the Harry & Jeanette Weinberg Foundation, Atlantic Philanthropies and others. The EBDI has also been criticized as gentrification and an example of a "big institution pushing out a vulnerable community for its benefit" by city activists and academics.

=== Contracts with U.S. Immigration and Customs Enforcement (ICE) ===
In 2018, thousands of students called on Johns Hopkins University to end their million dollar contracts with U.S. Immigration and Customs Enforcement (ICE) through teach-ins, protests, a petition, and a sit-in and occupation of Garland Hall in tandem with calls to cancel the Johns Hopkins Police Department. After these protests, Johns Hopkins University cancelled their contracts with ICE in 2019, however the university has drawn criticism for opening three new contracts with U.S. Customs and Border Patrol (CBP) afterwards.

=== Johns Hopkins Police Department ===
In 2018, citing the "brazenness" of crime in Baltimore, Daniels appealed to Maryland's legislature to give Johns Hopkins the power to create a police force of its own to patrol its campus. A community consultation process was conducted in Fall of 2018, after a first attempt to pass it through the legislature stalled. Daniels made door-to-door visits in East Baltimore, canvassing for the plan and seeking input from people in the neighborhood. Creation of a Hopkins police force received the support of Maryland Governor Larry Hogan, then-Mayor Catherine Pugh and Hopkins alumnus Michael Bloomberg, among others. However, support among neighborhood associations was divided, and the bill received criticism from activists, including 90 university professors at Hopkins and, according to a student government poll, 75% of JHU's undergraduate student body. Ultimately, the Maryland General Assembly gave approval to Hopkins to form the force in April, 2019. Following the vote, student protesters occupied Garland Hall, the administration building of JHU's Homewood Campus for over a month, eventually locking Daniels and other administrators out of the building. Following the lockout, Daniels announced students that did not leave peacefully risked suspension or expulsion from the university. Finally, on May 8, the protesters were removed and arrested (though not prosecuted) by Baltimore City Police.

Activism and resistance to the implementation of a private police force by Johns Hopkins University continued in 2022, where students, activists, and community members protested two town halls with the stated purpose of soliciting feedback on the memorandum of understanding between the proposed Johns Hopkins Police Department and the Baltimore City Police Department. Johns Hopkins moved the town halls to an online-only format after these protests.

== Bibliography ==
Daniels’ writing is interdisciplinary, combining the fields of law, economics, development and public policy. Much of his recent work concerns life-science research in America and the role of research universities in liberal democracies. Additionally, he writes about the need for institutional support of local economies, public versus private universities, and the role of humanities in education and society.

- What Universities Owe Democracy, Ronald J. Daniels with Grant Sheve and Phillip Spector. Description & scrollable preview. (Johns Hopkins University Press, 2021).
- A generation at risk: Young investigators and the future of the biomedical workforce, Ronald J. Daniels (Proceedings of the National Academy of Sciences of the United States of America, 2015)
- How to Reverse the Graying of Scientific Research, Ronald J. Daniels and Paul Rothman (The Wall Street Journal, March 4, 2014).
- Rule of Law Reform and Development: Charting the Fragile Path of Progress, Michael J. Trebilcock and Ronald J. Daniels (Cheltenham: Elgar Press, 2008).
- On Risk and Disaster: Lessons from Hurricane Katrina, Ronald J. Daniels, Donald F. Kettl & Howard Kunreuther, eds, (Philadelphia: University of Pennsylvania Press, 2005).
- Rethinking the Welfare State: Government by Voucher, Ronald J. Daniels & Michael J. Trebilcock (London: Routledge, 2005).
- The Security of Freedom, Ronald J. Daniels, Patrick Macklem & Kent Roach, eds, (Toronto: University of Toronto Press, 2001).
- George Triantis and Ronald J. Daniels, The Role of Debt in Interactive Corporate Governance, 83 California Law Review 1073 (1995).
- Corporate Decision-Making in Canada (Calgary: University of Calgary Press, 1995).
- Ontario Hydro at the Millennium (Kingston: McGill-Queen's University Press, 1995).
- "Corporate Governance in Canada" (Fall 1995) Canadian Business Law Journal.
- "Special Issue on the Corporate Stakeholder Debate: The Classical Theory and its Critics" (1993) 43(3) University of Toronto Law Journal.
- Cases and Materials on Partnerships and Canadian Business Corporations, Third Edition, J. S. Ziegel, Ronald J. Daniels, J. G. MacIntosh & D. Johnston (Toronto: Carswell & Company, 1994).
