= Canadian Council on International Law =

Canadian not-for-profit organization

The Canadian Council on International Law (CCIL) is a not-for-profit organization founded in 1972 by Sir Ronald St. John Macdonald. The mandate of the organization is to further the worldwide discussion of international legal issues including public and private international law. The organization brings together all four sectors of law, namely private practitioners, scholars, NGO's, and government lawyers, through various events and an annual conference held at the Government of Canada facility of foreign affairs, currently known as Global Affairs Canada.

The organization also honours outstanding lawyers and students through awards and scholarships, including the John E. Read Medal, the Public Sector Lawyer Award, the Leslie C. Green Veterans Scholarship and, importantly, the John Peters Humphrey Student Fellowships.

Former recipients of the John E. Read Medal include: Stephen Toope, current director of the Munk School of Global Affairs, University of Toronto; and Donald McRae, Hyman Soloway Chair and full professor at the University of Ottawa.

Past presidents of the organization include: the above-noted Stephen Toope; Donald McRae; Valerie Hughes, former director, legal affairs, of the World Trade Organization Secretariat; Robert Brookfield, deputy legal adviser and director general, Trade Law Bureau, Global Affairs Canada; Craig Forcese, professor and vice-dean, graduate studies, the University of Ottawa; Adrienne Jarabek Marion, human rights lawyer and founder of the Security and Intelligence Human Rights Council (SIHRC) of Canada, and Marie-Claude Boisvert, senior counsel and deputy director, Trade Law Bureau, Departments of Justice and Global Affairs Canada. The full list is on their website.

The current sitting president of the organization is Gib van Ert, who practices civil litigation and public law with Olthuis van Ert in Ottawa and Vancouver.
