= University of Toronto Law Journal =

- Language: English
- Edited by: David Dyzenhaus

Publication details
- History: 1935–present
- Publisher: University of Toronto Press (Canada)
- Frequency: Quarterly
- Impact factor: 1.234 (2020)

Standard abbreviations
- Bluebook: U. Toronto L.J.
- ISO 4: Univ. Tor. Law J.

Indexing
- ISSN: 0042-0220 (print); 1710-1174 (web)
- LCCN: 37006230
- JSTOR: 00420220
- OCLC no.: 937007257

Links
- Journal homepage; Online access; Online archive

The University of Toronto Law Journal is a law review published by University of Toronto Press. It was established in 1935 by William Paul McClure Kennedy.

== History ==
The journal was established in 1935 "under the insistent prompting of Dean W.P.M. Kennedy". Kennedy viewed it as a means to pursue his view of legal scholarship as a form of social science, as opposed to a way to meet the needs of legal practitioners. Donna Greschner describes the review under Kennedy's leadership as an "explicitly academic journal jointly published by faculty and students".

The journal was the second law review based at a Canadian university. The first was the Alberta Law Quarterly, published from 1934 to 1944, and revived in 1955 as the Alberta Law Review. As of its establishment, the University of Toronto Law Journal was released annually each February.

In 1955, F.E. La Brie was named the journal's editor-in-chief. Ronald St. John Macdonald edited the review before leaving the University of Toronto for Dalhousie University in the early 1970s. As of 2021, the editor is David Dyzenhaus.

The journal has been published quarterly at least since 1968.

== Abstracting and indexing ==
The journal is abstracted and indexed in:

- Academic Search Premier
- Current Contents/Social and Behavioral Sciences
- EBSCO databases
- HeinOnline
- International Bibliography of Periodical Literature
- Modern Language Association Database
- ProQuest databases
- Scopus
- Social Sciences Citation Index

According to the Journal Citation Reports, the journal has a 2020 impact factor of 1.234.

== Sources ==
- Greschner, Donna (2001). "Law Reviews as Cultural Narrative". Alberta Law Review. 39 (3): 616–624. doi:10.29173/alr1401. ISSN 1925-8356. 2001 CanLIIDocs 127.
- Risk, R.C.B. (1987). "Volume 1 of the Journal: A Tribute and a Belated Review". University of Toronto Law Journal. 37 (2): 193–211. doi:10.2307/825706. JSTOR 825706.
- Ryder, Bruce (2001). "The Past and Future of Canadian Generalist Law Journals". Alberta Law Review. 39 (3): 625–639. doi:10.29173/alr1402. ISSN 1925-8356. 2001 CanLIIDocs 128.
