= Andy Orchard =

British academic (born 1964)

Andy Orchard FRSC FBA
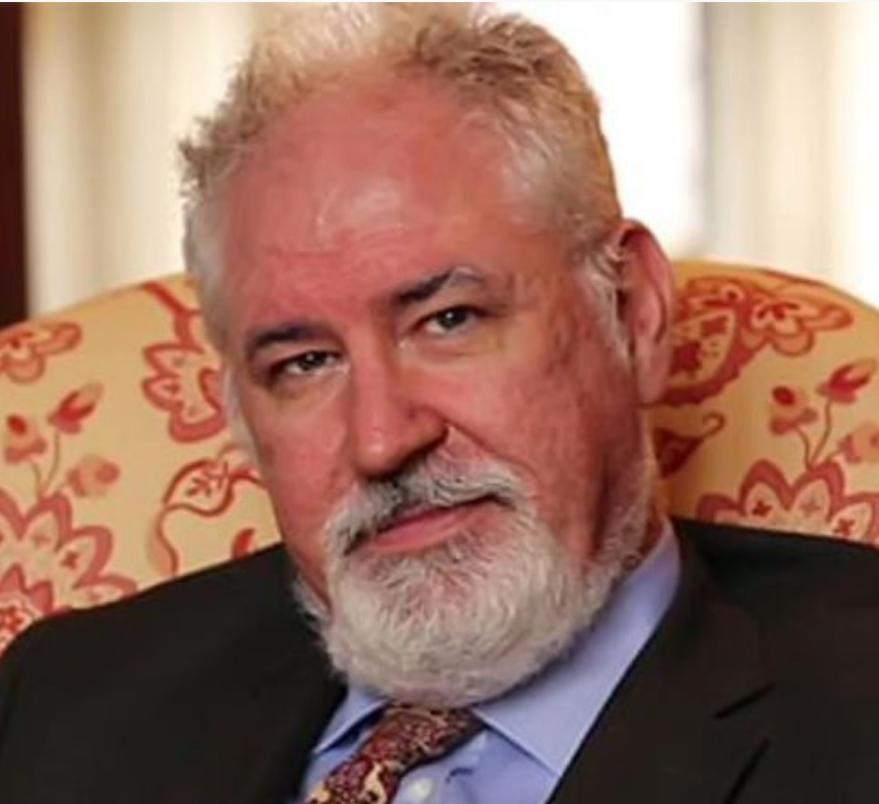

21st Rawlinson and Bosworth Professor of Anglo-Saxon
- Incumbent
- Assumed office 2013
- Preceded by: Malcolm Godden

14th Provost of Trinity College, Toronto
- In office 2007–2013
- Chancellor: Bill Graham
- Preceded by: Margaret MacMillan
- Succeeded by: Mayo Moran

Personal details
- Born: Andrew Philip McDowell Orchard; 27 February 1964 (age 62)
- Citizenship: United Kingdom
- Spouse: Clare Brind (m. 1991)
- Children: 2
- Education: University College School; Queens' College, Cambridge; Exeter College, Oxford

Andrew Philip McDowell Orchard (born 27 February 1964) is a British academic of Old English, Norse and Celtic literature. He is Rawlinson and Bosworth Professor of Anglo-Saxon at the University of Oxford and a fellow of Pembroke College, Oxford. He was previously Provost of Trinity College, Toronto, from 2007 to 2013. In 2021, claims of sexual harassment and assault by Orchard were publicised, which were alleged to have taken place at universities where he has worked, including the University of Cambridge and the University of Toronto.

== Biography ==
Orchard was born on 27 February 1964 in North London, England. He was educated at University College School, then an all-boys private school in London.

Orchard's undergraduate degree was undertaken at both Queens' College, Cambridge, where he read Anglo-Saxon, Norse and Celtic from 1983, and Exeter College, Oxford, where he read English from 1985. He graduated in 1987 Bachelor of Arts (BA), which was later promoted to Master of Arts (MA). He then undertook postgraduate study at the University of Cambridge, completing his Doctor of Philosophy (PhD) degree in 1990. His doctoral thesis was titled The Poetic Art of Aldhelm.

In 1991, Orchard married Clare Brind in Oxford.

== Academic career ==
In 1990, Orchard was a fellow of St John's College, Oxford. He then returned to the University of Cambridge upon completion of his postgraduate degree. In 1991, he became a fellow of Emmanuel College, Cambridge and a lecturer in Anglo-Saxon, Norse and Celtic. He served as Emmanuel College's Admissions Tutor for Arts. In 1999, he was appointed Reader and Head of the Department of Anglo-Saxon, Norse and Celtic.

In 2000, Orchard moved to the University of Toronto where he took up the post of Professor of English and Medieval Studies. In 2001, he became the associate director of the Centre for Medieval Studies and an Associate of Trinity College, Toronto. He became a fellow of Trinity College in 2003, and Director of the Centre for Medieval Studies in 2004. He was appointed the 14th Provost of Trinity College in 2007.

In 2013, Orchard moved to the University of Oxford to take up the post of Rawlinson and Bosworth Professor of Anglo-Saxon and became a fellow of Pembroke College.

=== Sexual harassment allegations ===
In 2021, Al Jazeera Investigates published their findings following a two-year investigation of Orchard's "personal reputation as a sexual predator" and alleged alcohol abuse in the context of his work supervising graduate students at Cambridge University, the University of Toronto, and the University of Oxford. The I-Unit investigation found that Orchard had a history of allegedly sexually harassing and initiating inappropriate sexual relationships with female PhD students, and intimidating and bullying students and colleagues from his time teaching at the University of Cambridge in the 1990s. According to the article, Orchard and his lawyers dispute I-Unit's findings.

Following up on Orchard's time at the University of Toronto from 2007 to 2013, the Toronto Star published their findings that the university had received at least two formal complaints against him regarding sexual advances and inappropriate touching during his time as Provost and Vice-Chancellor at Trinity College. Their report alleged that the victims faced repercussions whereas Orchard himself did not.

In October 2021, the University of Toronto committed to removing Orchard's portrait from Trinity College in response to his alleged pattern of sexual harassment.

At Oxford, while reporting that none of the allegations reported by Al Jazeera pertained to Pembroke College students and that the college had received no complaints concerning Orchard's conduct, Pembroke College announced that Orchard had voluntarily withdrawn from the college's governing body and that "for the foreseeable future he will not attend College for social or academic functions". Orchard's teaching duties, however, were managed by the English Faculty; its board announced that, by mutual agreement, Orchard was not at that time teaching undergraduate or master's level students, and that individual discussions regarding the supervision of research students were taking place. In January 2022, the Toronto Star reported that "in the next few weeks, [Oxford University] will meet students and faculties where concerns have been raised and 'explore areas where improvements can be made'."

Following a petition to the Oxford-based journal Notes and Queries to remove Orchard from its editorial board, his name was removed from the masthead on 30 November 2021. He was also removed from the editorial board of the journal Anglo-Saxon England by Cambridge University Press.

== Honours ==
Orchard was awarded the Pilkington Prize for excellence in teaching from the University of Cambridge in 1998. In 2012, he was elected Fellow of the Royal Society of Canada (FRSC). On 16 July 2015, he was elected a Fellow of the British Academy (FBA). In 2019 he delivered the British Academy's Sir Israel Gollancz Memorial Lecture.

== Reception ==
In 2004, Hugh Magennis described A Critical Companion to Beowulf as "something of a masterclass in the reading of Beowulf". Josephine Bloomfield thought that the book would "be important to Beowulf study for years to come, and a stimulus to healthy interchange and argument for even longer". In 2004 Elaine Treharne described the same work as "brilliant, comprehensive and inspiring". Reviewing the same work, Daniel Anlezark characterised Orchard as "one of the outstanding Beowulf scholars of the moment".

== Works ==
- Orchard, Andy (1994). The Poetic Art of Aldhelm. Cambridge: Cambridge University Press. ISBN 052145090X.
- —— (1995). Pride and Prodigies: Studies in the Monsters of the Beowulf-manuscript. Cambridge: D. S. Brewer. ISBN 0859914569.
- —— (1996). Dictionary of Norse Myth and Legend. London: Cassell. ISBN 0304345202.
- —— (2004). A Critical Companion to Beowulf. Cambridge: Brewer. ISBN 0859917665.
- —— (2021). The Old English and Anglo-Latin Riddle Tradition. Dumbarton Oaks Medieval Library. Vol. 69. Cambridge, MA: Harvard University Press. ISBN 978-0674055339.
- —— (2021). A Commentary on "The Old English and Anglo-Latin Riddle Tradition". Supplements to the Dumbarton Oaks Medieval Library. Washington, DC: Dumbarton Oaks. ISBN 978-0884024774.

== See also ==
- Hector Munro Chadwick
- Gabriel Turville-Petre
- Jan de Vries (philologist)
- John Lindow
- Rudolf Simek
- Hilda Ellis Davidson

Academic offices
Preceded by Margaret MacMillan	Provost of Trinity College, Toronto; 2007–2013	Succeeded by Mayo Moran
Preceded by Malcolm Godden	Rawlinson and Bosworth Professor of Anglo-Saxon; University of Oxford; 2013–present	Incumbent
