= Thomas Delworth =

Canadian diplomat (1929–2012)

William Thomas Delworth

Provost of Trinity College, Toronto
- In office 1996–2002
- Chancellor: The Rt. Rev'd John Bothwell
- Preceded by: Robert H. Painter
- Succeeded by: Margaret MacMillan

Personal details
- Born: 24 February 1929 Near Weston, Ontario, Canada
- Died: 29 October 2012 (aged 83) Ottawa, Ontario, Canada
- Education: University of Toronto (BA, MA)
- Occupation: Diplomat, academic

William Thomas Delworth (February 24, 1929 – October 29, 2012) was a Canadian diplomat and academic.

Born near Weston, Ontario, Delworth studied at Weston Collegiate and Vocational School and at the University of Toronto where he received a Bachelor of Arts in psychology in 1951 and a Master of Arts degree in modern history in 1956. A diplomat, he was the Canadian Ambassador to Indonesia (1970–1974), Hungary (1975–1978), Sweden (1984–1988), and Germany (1987–1992).

After retiring in 1993, he taught at the University of Toronto where he was appointed Provost of Trinity College from 1996 to 2002. He died in Ottawa, Ontario in 2012.
