= Stephen Waddams =

Canadian legal scholar (1942–2023)

Stephen Waddams FRSC
- Born: Stephen Michael Waddams; September 30, 1942; Woking, England
- Died: May 27, 2023 (aged 80); Toronto, Ontario, Canada

Academic background
- Education: University of Toronto (BA, LLB); University of Cambridge (MA, PhD); University of Michigan (LLM, SJD)

Academic work
- Discipline: Law
- Sub-discipline: Contracts law Legal history
- Institutions: University of Toronto Faculty of Law

Stephen Michael Waddams FRSC (September 30, 1942 – May 27, 2023) was an English-born Canadian legal scholar. He taught at the University of Toronto Faculty of Law.

== Early life and education ==
Waddams was born in Woking, England, and moved to Canada as a teenager in 1959. He earned a Bachelor of Arts degree from the University of Toronto and Bachelor of Laws from the University of Toronto Faculty of Law. As a law student, he was editor-in-chief of the University of Toronto Faculty of Law Review in 1968. Waddams earned a Master of Arts and PhD from the University of Cambridge, followed by a Master of Laws and Doctor of Juridical Science from the University of Michigan Law School.

== Career ==
Waddams' specialty was contract law and he published seven books on it and other private law topics. In 1988, he was elected a fellow of the Royal Society of Canada. From 1988 to 1989, he was a visiting fellow at All Souls College, Oxford.

== Death ==
Waddams died on May 27, 2023, at the age of 80.

== Books ==
- Products Liability (Carswell, Toronto, 1974; subsequent editions in 1980, 1993, and 2002).
- The Law of Contracts (Canada Law Book, Toronto, 1977; subsequent editions in 1984, 1993, 1999, and 2005).
- Introduction to the Study of Law (Carswell, Toronto, 1979; subsequent editions in 1983, 1987, 1992, 1997, and 2004).
- The Law of Damages (Canada Law Book, Toronto, 1983; subsequent editions in 1991, 1997, and 2004).
- Law, Politics, and the Church of England: the career of Stephen Lushington, 1782 - 1873 (Cambridge University Press, 1992).
- Sexual Slander in Nineteenth-Century England: Defamation in the Ecclesiastical Courts, 1815–1855 (University of Toronto Press, 2000).
- Dimensions of Private Law: Categories and Concepts in Anglo-American Reasoning (Cambridge University Press, 2003).
- Principles and Policy in Contract Law: Competing or Complementary Perspectives? (Cambridge University Press, 2011).
- Sanctity of Contracts in a Secular Age: Equity, Fairness and Enrichment (Cambridge University Press, 2019).
