= University of Toronto Faculty of Law =

Law school of the University of Toronto

Henry N.R. Jackman Faculty of Law
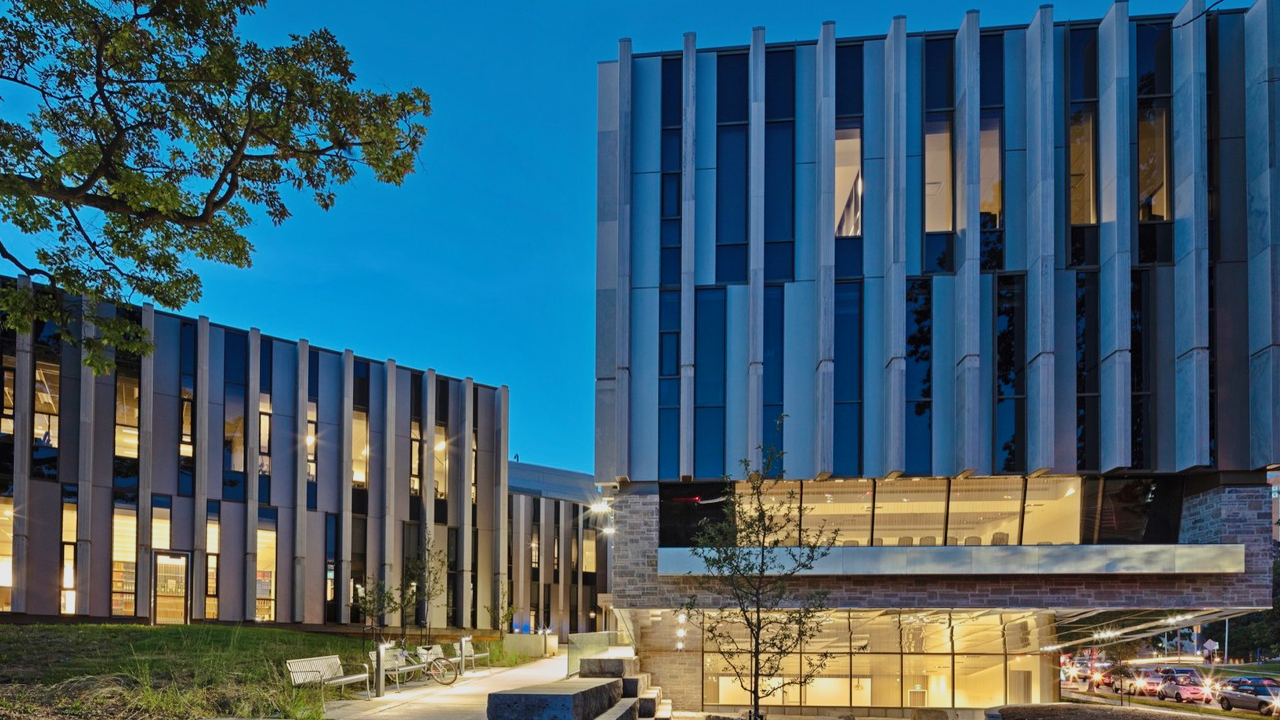
- Exterior of the Jackman Law Building
- Motto: Regnum juris regnum pacis (Latin for 'Rule of Law, Rule of Peace')
- Parent school: University of Toronto
- Established: 1889; 137 years ago 1949 (in current state)
- School type: Public law school
- Parent endowment: $3.62 billion CAD (2024)
- Dean: Christopher Essert
- Location: Toronto, Ontario, Canada; 43°39′57″N 79°23′38″W
- Enrolment: 815
- Faculty: 125
- Website: jackmanlaw.utoronto.ca

The Henry N.R. Jackman Faculty of Law (formerly and still commonly the Faculty of Law) is the law school of the University of Toronto. It operates on the university's St. George campus in downtown Toronto, Ontario, Canada.

Originally founded in 1889, it is among the oldest law faculties in Canada. The school was reorganized in the early 1950s into a modern professional faculty, and its Juris Doctor degree replaced the Bachelor of Laws (LLB) in 2001. Originally named the University of Toronto Faculty of Law, the school was renamed after alumnus Henry N.R. Jackman in September 2025, following his CA$80 million donation to the school.

Alumni of the law school include two Canadian prime ministers, William Lyon Mackenzie King and Paul Martin; multiple justices of the Supreme Court of Canada, including Chief Justice Bora Laskin and Justice Rosalie Abella; and several provincial premiers, cabinet ministers, and senior judges. International leaders among its graduates include Eugenia Charles, prime minister of Dominica, and Noor Hassanali, president of Trinidad and Tobago. Other alumni include novelist Guy Gavriel Kay, university president Ronald J. Daniels of Johns Hopkins University, and the current or past deans of leading global law schools: Stanford, Columbia, the University of Oxford, and Berkeley.

== History ==
The Faculty of Law was established as a teaching faculty in 1887 pursuant to the University Federation Act, which was proclaimed into force in 1889. An earlier faculty of law had existed at King's College between 1843 and 1854, but was abolished by an Act of Parliament in 1853.

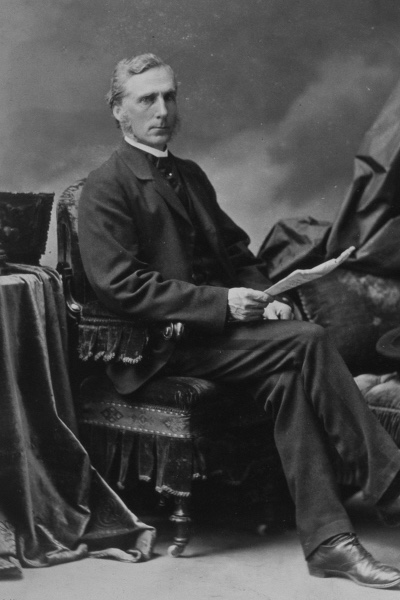
William Proudfoot, Barrister and Professor

The Faculty of Law was officially opened in 1889, with two part-time professors appointed at its inauguration, William Proudfoot and David Mills. The Faculty awarded LLB degrees to graduates of its program. However, the Law Society of Upper Canada at the time refused to accept the Faculty of Law as an accredited law school, preferring instead to maintain control over the profession by establishing its own school, the Osgoode Hall Law School. Thus, students who graduated from the Faculty were still required to complete a full three-year articling term and complete courses at Osgoode Hall in order to join the legal profession. As a result, the Faculty's enrolment numbers in the early years were relatively low.

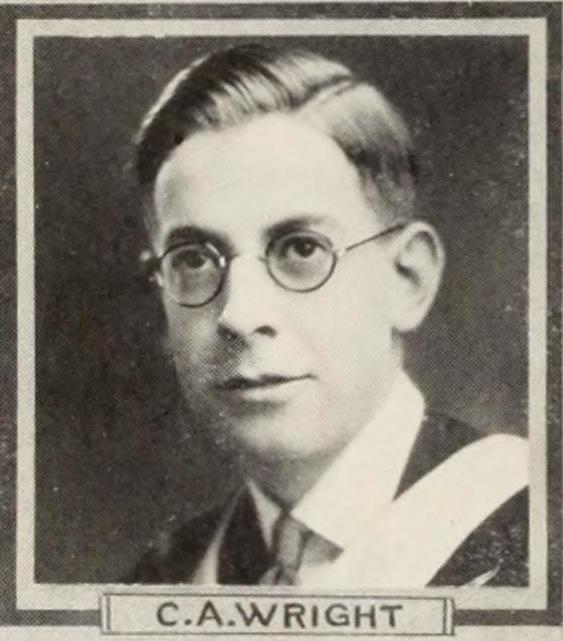
Caesar Wright, the faculty's second dean, in 1923

Despite the Faculty of Law's academic program, the Law Society of Upper Canada refused to recognize it as a degree-granting institution for the purposes of accreditation. In the early 1950s, law students and their supporters petitioned the Law Society, and in 1953, a group of 50 student protesters marched on Osgoode Hall demanding formal recognition for the Faculty of Law. Finally, in 1958, after years of negotiation and discord, the Law Society began to give credit to graduates of the law school seeking admission to the Ontario bar.

In 2011, the Faculty of Law launched a campaign to raise money for the renovation and expansion of Flavelle House, with a goal of raising CA$53 million. The new building is named the Jackman Law Building in honour of Henry N.R. "Hal" Jackman, who donated CA$11 million to the faculty's building campaign in 2012, the largest single gift the faculty has ever received. The Jackman Law Building, located on the university's St. George campus, was designed as a joint venture between B+H Architects and Hariri Pontariri Architects.

On September 9, 2025, the Faculty of Law was renamed the Henry N.R. Jackman Faculty of Law, following an CA$80 million gift from Henry Newton Rowell "Hal" Jackman.

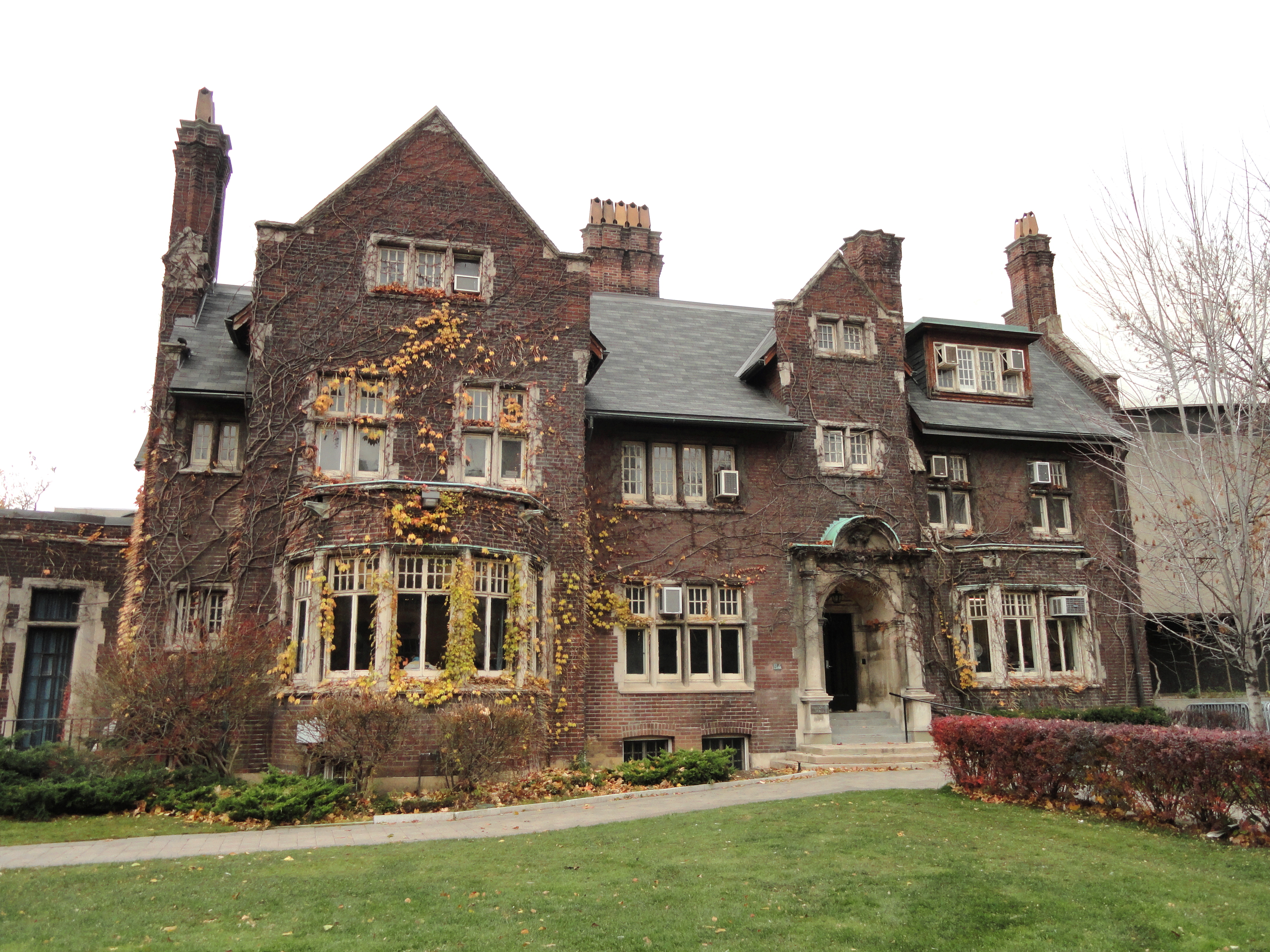
Falconer Hall

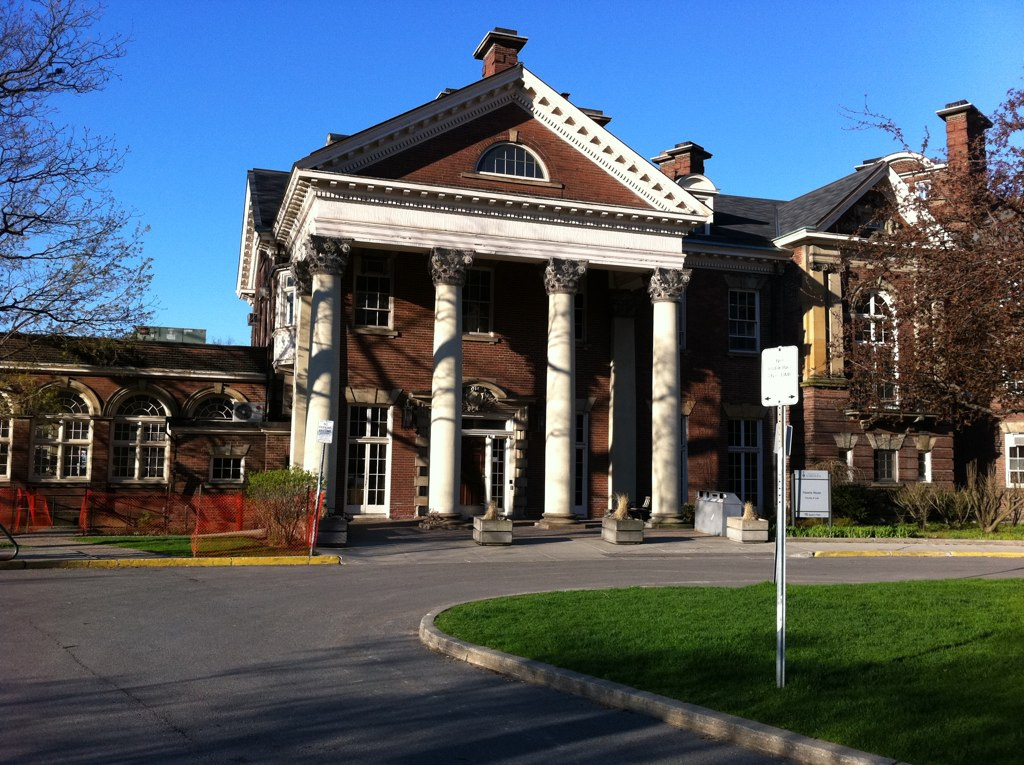
Flavelle House

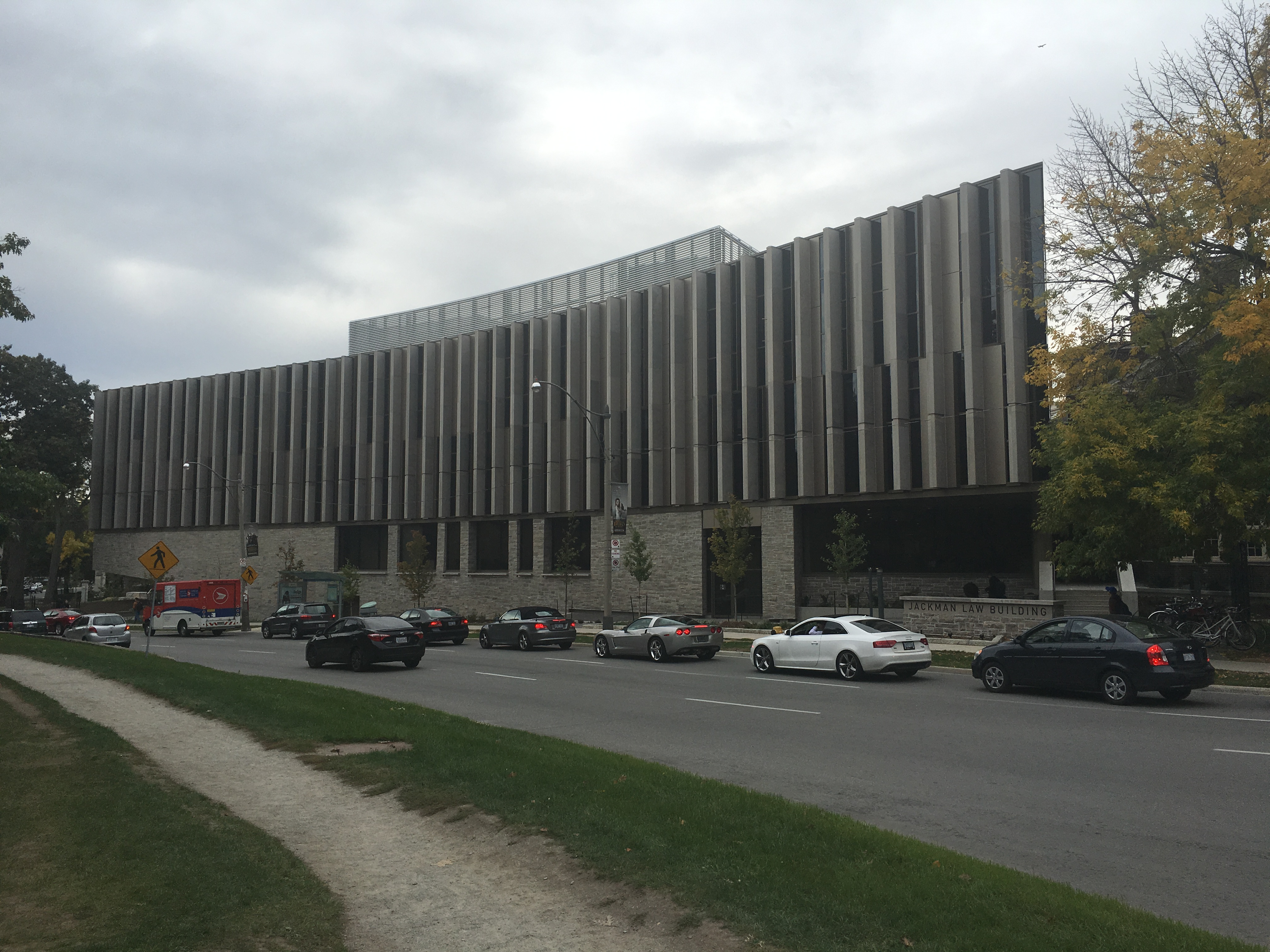
Jackman Law Building in 2016

== Rankings ==
World rankings
QS World	16
THE World	22

In 2025, the Faculty of Law was ranked 16th globally in the subject of law by the QS World University Rankings and 22nd globally by Times Higher Education. Both global law school rankings place the Faculty of Law among the top 10 law schools in North America.

Within Canada, the Faculty has consistently been rated as the top law school for Common Law. It has held the number one spot in Maclean's law school rankings for Common Law since the rankings' inception in 2007 and is the highest ranked in terms of faculty journal citations.

== Academic programs ==
The Faculty of Law offers a range of professional and graduate degrees, as well as combined programmes with other University of Toronto faculties:

- Juris Doctor (JD)

Introduced in 2001 as a replacement for the LLB, the JD is the Faculty’s core professional degree. Each class has roughly 200 students, admitted on the basis of an undergraduate degree and LSAT score.

- Combined JD programs

The Faculty offers Canada’s largest selection of combined programs, including JD/MBA with the Rotman School of Management, JD/MPP with the Munk School of Global Affairs and Public Policy, JD/MSW with the Factor-Inwentash Faculty of Social Work, and JD/MA or JD/PhD with the Faculty of Arts and Science.

- Master of Laws (LLM)

A one-year graduate degree offered in thesis or coursework formats, with concentrations such as Business Law, Criminal Law, Legal Theory, and Health Law, Ethics and Policy.

- Global Professional Master of Laws (GPLLM)

A 12-month executive-style program for working professionals, with streams in Business Law, Canadian Law in a Global Context, Innovation, Law and Technology, and Leadership. Prior legal education is not required.

- Master of Studies in Law (MSL)

Designed for non-law academics whose research intersects with law, providing foundational legal training to enrich interdisciplinary work.

- Doctor of Juridical Science (SJD)

The Faculty’s research doctorate, requiring advanced coursework and a dissertation of 90,000–100,000 words. It is the only terminal SJD program in Canada.

== Student body ==
For fall 2025, the entering JD class at the Faculty of Law received 2,771 applications, and enrolled 220 first-year students. The class profile includes a median LSAT score of 168 (94th percentile) and a median undergraduate GPA of 3.90.

Other demographic and academic statistics for the JD entering class include:

- 46 undergraduate institutions represented.
- 56% women.
- 45% students of colour.
- 85% are the first in their family to attend law school; 6% are the first to attend university or college.
- 31% born outside Canada; 62% have at least one parent or guardian born outside Canada.
- 14% of students hold a prior graduate degree.
- Entering combined programs include JD/MBA, JD/MA in Criminology, Economics, or English, JD/MGA, and JD/MPP.

== Faculty members ==
The Faculty of Law has over 50 full-time faculty members and serves approximately 640 students across its JD, graduate, and professional degree programs. Many of its permanent faculty are recognized scholars who publish widely in their areas. Current faculty include:

- Benjamin Alarie (Tax Law)
- Anita Anand (Business Law)
- John Borrows (Indigenous Law)
- Jutta Brunnée (Environmental Law)
- Brenda Cossman (Family Law & Sexuality)
- David Dyzenhaus (Law & Philosophy)
- Mohammad Fadel (Islamic Law)
- Martin Friedland (Legal History)
- Gillian Hadfield (Law & Technology)
- Ran Hirschl (Constitutional Law)
- Edward Iacobucci (Competition Law)
- Gord Kirke (Sports & Entertainment Law)
- Audrey Macklin (Immigration & Human Rights)
- Arthur Ripstein (Legal Philosophy)
- Kent Roach (Criminal Law)
- Ayelet Shachar (Immigration Law)
- Michael Trebilcock (Law and Economics)
- Ernest Weinrib (Tort Law)

Its Distinguished Visitors program brings short-term visiting professors and jurists from leading law schools and international institutions to teach at the Faculty each year. Past visitors have included Aharon Barak, former president of the Supreme Court of Israel; Zhenmin Wang, former dean of the Faculty of Law at Tsinghua University; David M. Malone, former permanent representative of Canada to the United Nations; Payam Akhavan, member of the Permanent Court of Arbitration at the Hague; Guido Pincione of the University of Buenos Aires; and Hanoch Dagan of the University of California, Berkeley.

== Legal clinics and internships ==
The Faculty of Law offers several clinical programs, enabling students to engage directly with clients on real-world legal matters. Students provide legal representation and advocacy in areas including public-interest law, international human rights, constitutional litigation, investor protection, and health equity. Additional community partnerships allow students to serve Indigenous communities, injured workers, and women experiencing violence. Clinics offer volunteer and academic-credit opportunities under professional supervision, combining practical legal training with community service.

== International exchange programs ==
The Faculty of Law offers JD students the option to spend a semester abroad through exchange partnerships with leading universities in Europe, Asia, Oceania, and the Middle East. Notable partners include the National University of Singapore Faculty of Law, the University of Hong Kong Faculty of Law, Melbourne Law School, and Sydney Law School.

Students may also participate in the Centre for Transnational Legal Studies (CTLS) in London, a collaborative program run by an international consortium of law faculties. Faculty members from U of T Law regularly teach there alongside international colleagues.

== Tuition and financial aid ==
The Faculty of Law has the highest tuition among Canadian law schools. For the 2023–24 academic year, tuition for Ontario residents enrolled in the Juris Doctor (JD) program is approximately C$33,040, rising to C$35,730 for other Canadian students, and C$62,880 for international students. Including mandatory fees, total annual costs are approximately C$34,000 for domestic students from Ontario and over C$64,000 for international students.

To mitigate these costs, the Faculty provides a needs-based financial aid program. In the 2019–2020 academic year, approximately C$4.3 million in bursaries and interest-free loans were awarded to around 82% of financial aid applicants, with first-year students receiving an average bursary of C$12,500. Additionally, all students demonstrating unmet financial need receive bursaries and assistance with interest payments on private student loans during their studies.

The Faculty uniquely offers Canada's first back-end debt relief program, designed to help graduates pursuing lower-income careers. This program subsidizes repayments of recognized financial aid and interest-free loans for up to ten years after graduation, but generally excludes private bank loans and credit lines.

== Grading system ==
The Juris Doctor (JD) program at the Faculty of Law uses a modified honours/pass/fail grading system introduced in the 2012–2013 academic year. The system awards grades of High Honours (HH), Honours (H), Pass with Merit (P), Low Pass (LP), and Fail (F). Students who began law school before 2012 continued under the former modified letter-grade system during a transition period. Graduates receiving a distinction (typically the top 10% of the class) generally have mostly High Honours (HH) and Honours (H) grades.

== Centres and institutes ==
The Faculty of Law hosts several interdisciplinary centres and institutes that convene scholars, students, and practitioners to explore contemporary legal challenges and advance public-policy impact:

- David Asper Centre for Constitutional Rights

Founded in 2008 with a CA $7.5 million endowment, the Centre focuses on constitutional rights advocacy, research, and education in Canada. It hosts a legal clinic where students, faculty, and the bar engage in constitutional litigation and public legal education.

- Centre for the Legal Profession

A forum that brings together academics, judges, practitioners, and public-interest lawyers to discuss and strengthen the capacities, judgment, and community leadership integral to ethical and effective lawyering.

- Centre for Innovation Law and Policy (CILP)

An interdisciplinary hub dedicated to the intersection of law, technology, and innovation. It organizes conferences, lectures, seminars, and supports graduate fellowships and faculty-student research initiatives.

- Capital Markets Institute (CMI)

A joint venture with Rotman School of Management that leads research on capital market structure and regulation, aiming to improve investor and issuer outcomes within Canada’s financial ecosystem.

- Future of Law Lab

Launched in September 2020, this initiative connects students, academics, and legal professionals to explore how technology, innovation, entrepreneurship, and access-to-justice intersect with legal practice. Its programming includes speaker series, hackathons, workshops, externships, and summer fellowships.

== Publications ==
The Faculty of Law is home to several prominent legal journals and publications that contribute significantly to Canadian and international legal scholarship:

- University of Toronto Law Journal – Established in 1935, it is internationally recognized for interdisciplinary and comparative legal research.
- University of Toronto Faculty of Law Review – Canada’s oldest student-edited law journal, publishing bilingual student scholarship twice annually.
- Canadian Business Law Journal – Founded in 1974, this journal covers developments in Canadian and international business law.
- Critical Analysis of Law: An International & Interdisciplinary Law Review – Provides an interdisciplinary forum exploring contemporary legal theories.
- Middle East Law and Governance – A collaborative publication with Yale Law School, focusing on legal and socio-political issues in the Middle East.
- Journal of Law and Equality – A student-run, peer-reviewed journal emphasizing equality issues within Canadian contexts.
- Indigenous Law Journal – Canada’s first student-run legal journal dedicated exclusively to Indigenous legal issues.

Additional lists of Canadian legal periodicals, including those based at the University of Toronto, can be found through academic library guides.

== Student organizations ==
The Faculty of Law supports a extracurricular network of approximately 65–70 officially recognized student clubs and initiatives, spanning legal practice, cultural identity, arts, recreation, advocacy, and special interests. Governance is provided by two umbrella bodies: the Students' Law Society (for JD students) and the Graduate Students' Law Society, which manage funding, administrative support, and student advocacy.

== Post-graduation employment ==
The Faculty of Law consistently achieves among the highest employment rates and average starting salaries for legal graduates in Canada, with a significant number securing positions at top Bay Street firms annually. Over 95% of JD graduates obtain legal employment—either as articling students in Canada or as licensed lawyers in jurisdictions without an articling requirement, such as the United States.

=== Bay Street employment ===
Bay Street, located in Toronto, is colloquially known as Canada's financial and legal hub, housing many of the country's most influential corporate law firms. Among these are the historically prominent "Seven Sisters" firms, which have long been considered the elite of Canadian business law. These firms include:

- Blake, Cassels & Graydon LLP (Blakes)
- Davies Ward Phillips & Vineberg LLP
- Goodmans LLP
- McCarthy Tétrault LLP
- Osler, Hoskin & Harcourt LLP
- Stikeman Elliott LLP
- Torys LLP

These firms, along with other leading national and international firms such as Borden Ladner Gervais LLP (BLG), Fasken Martineau DuMoulin LLP (Fasken), Bennett Jones LLP, and Gowling WLG, regularly participate in the Toronto 2L Summer Recruit process, offering summer positions that often lead to articling opportunities and full-time employment.

The Faculty of Law has established strong relationships with these firms, resulting in a significant number of its students securing positions on Bay Street annually. In the 2025 Toronto Summer 2L Recruit, at least 104 U of T Law students obtained summer positions through the official recruit, representing 48.6% of the class. Notably, Blakes hired the highest number of U of T Law students, with 13 securing positions at the firm.

=== Government employment ===
A portion of Jackman Law graduates pursue careers in government legal services at both federal and provincial levels. Employers include the Department of Justice Canada, the Ontario Ministry of the Attorney General, and various Crown agencies. These positions encompass roles in criminal prosecution, regulatory enforcement, and policy development.

=== Public interest employment ===
The Faculty of Law maintains a strong commitment to public interest law, supported by its extensive clinical programs and public interest fellowships. Graduates often secure positions with legal aid organizations, non-governmental organizations (NGOs), and advocacy groups focusing on areas such as human rights, environmental law, and social justice.

=== U.S. summer associate positions ===
A growing number of students secure summer associate positions in the United States, particularly in New York City. From 2024 through 2026, at least 30 students each year have obtained such positions, with the majority working in New York.

In 2026, at least 30 students accepted summer associate roles in the U.S., predominantly in New York, along with placements in the San Francisco Bay Area and internationally in the London office of U.S. firms. The majority of these positions were secured through pre-OCI recruitment, reflecting a shift in the hiring timeline for U.S. firms.

=== Judicial clerkships ===
The Faculty has a strong record of students obtaining competitive judicial clerkships. For the 2026–2027 term, 23 students from U of T Law will be clerking at various courts, including seven at the Court of Appeal for Ontario and seven at the Supreme Court of Canada. At the Supreme Court, U of T Law students will be clerking for six out of the nine judges.

== Notable alumni ==
=== Justices of the Supreme Court of Canada ===
- Bora Laskin (1936) — Chief Justice of Canada (1973–1984)
- John C. Major (1957) — puisne justice of Supreme Court of Canada (1992–2005), commissioner for the Air India Inquiry
- John Sopinka (1958) — puisne justice of the Supreme Court, (1988–1997)
- Ian Binnie (1965) — puisne justice of Supreme Court of Canada, (1998–2011) *(Honorary degree)
- Louis LeBel (LLM 1966) — puisne justice of Supreme Court of Canada, (2000–2014)
- Rosalie Silberman Abella (1970) — puisne justice of Supreme Court of Canada (2004–2021)
- Michael J. Moldaver (1971) — puisne justice of Supreme Court of Canada (2011–2022)
- Russell Brown (2003) — puisne justice of Supreme Court of Canada (2015–2023)
- Sheilah Martin (2017) — puisne justice of Supreme Court of Canada (2017–)

=== Politicians ===
- William Lyon Mackenzie King (1896) — Prime Minister of Canada (1921–1926; 1926–1930; 1935–1948)
- George Stewart Henry (1920) - 10th Premier of Ontario
- Noor Hassanali (1947) - President of Trinidad and Tobago
- Eugenia Charles (1947) — first female President of Dominica
- Jerry Grafstein (1954) — Canadian lawyer, businessman, former senator
- Trevor Eyton (1960) — businessman, former Canadian senator (1990–2009)
- Karl Jaffary (1962) — vice-president of the New Democratic Party (1969–1973), Toronto city alderman (1969–1974), urban reformist
- John Sewell (1964) — mayor of Toronto (1978–1980), columnist
- Paul Martin (1964) — Prime Minister of Canada (2003–2006)
- Bill Graham (1964) — former Minister of Foreign Affairs, Minister of Defence, and interim Leader of the Opposition
- David Kilgour (1966) — democracy activist and former MP, represented both the Progressive Conservative and Liberal parties
- David Peterson (1967) — Premier of Ontario (1985–1990)
- Bob Rae (1977) — Premier of Ontario (1990–1995), member of Parliament (1978–1982, 2008–present), Liberal Party of Canada foreign affairs critic
- Wayne Mapp (1980) — New Zealand Minister of Defence
- David Miller (1984) — mayor of Toronto (2003–2010)
- Alfred Apps (1985) — president of the Liberal Party of Canada (2009–2012)
- Tony Clement (1986) — Progressive Conservative MPP (1995–2003), Conservative Party MP (since 2006), and President of the Treasury Board (since 2011)
- Vivian Bercovici (1988) - Canadian Ambassador to Israel, 2014-2016
- Marcus Powlowski (1997) — physician and Member of Parliament (2019–present)
- Arif Virani (1998) — Minister of Justice and Attorney General of Canada (2023–)

=== Lawyers ===
- Morris C. Shumiatcher - human rights activist, drafted the 1947 Saskatchewan Bill of Rights
- John A. Tory (1952) - Son of Torys LLP founder John S. D. Tory
- Alan Borovoy (1956) - General counsel for the Canadian Civil Liberties Association (1968–2009)
- Alan Eagleson (1957) - first president of the NHLPA
- Harry Arthurs (1958) - labor lawyer and scholar
- Robert P. Armstrong (1965) - lead counsel in Dubin Inquiry, judge
- Clayton Ruby (1969) - Criminal lawyer
- James Kirkpatrick Stewart (1975) - international criminal prosecutor
- Jean Teillet - founder of the Métis Nation of Ontario, lead counsel in R. v. Powley
- Joseph Groia (1979) - securities lawyer, counsel for Bre-X, bencher
- Leilani Farha - human rights expert
- Barbara Jackman - immigration and refugee lawyer
- Malcolm Mercer - former law society treasurer, litigator
- Peter Rosenthal (1990) — civil rights lawyer and University of Toronto mathematics professor
- Rachel Sklar (1996) - U.S. media personality, CNN & Fox News contributor

=== Scholars ===
- John Read Teefy (LL.D. 1896) — president of St. Michael’s College, Toronto (1899–1911)
- Frank C. Ford — justice of the Supreme Court of Alberta (1926–1954); chancellor of the University of Alberta (1942–1946)
- Martin Friedland (1958) — professor of criminal law, author
- Harry Arthurs (1958) - president of York University
- Stephen Waddams (1967) — professor, private law theorist
- Robert Prichard (1975) — dean of the Faculty of Law (1984–1990), president of the University of Toronto (1990–2000)
- Ralph Simmonds (1976) — law professor and later justice of the Supreme Court of Western Australia
- Guy Gavriel Kay (1978) — fantasy novelist (The Fionavar Tapestry trilogy)
- Stephen R. Perry (1981) — professor of law and philosophy at the University of Pennsylvania; legal theorist
- Alasdair Roberts (1984) — professor of public policy, University of Massachusetts Amherst
- George Triantis (1983) - dean of Stanford Law School
- Bill Flanagan (1985) - president of the University of Alberta
- Stephen Alexander Smith (1985) — professor of law, McGill University; contract law scholar
- Ronald J. Daniels (1986) — dean of the Faculty of Law (1995–2005), provost and vice president, academic of the University of Pennsylvania, and current president of Johns Hopkins University
- Lisa Philipps (1986) — provost of York University (2018–present)
- Kent Roach (1987) — professor and specialist in criminal and constitutional law
- Timothy Endicott (1988) — dean of the Faculty of Law, University of Oxford (2007-2015), professor of legal philosophy in the University of Oxford
- Jocelyn Downie — law professor and expert in health law policy (Dalhousie University); end-of-life law scholar
- Jody Freeman (1989) — Harvard Law School professor; former White House counselor for energy and climate (2009–2010)
- Arie Reich (1989) - professor of law at Bar-Ilan University, Israeli legal scholar
- John Borrows (1990) — professor of Indigenous law
- William Lahey (1990) - president of University of King's College
- Gillian Lester (1990) — former dean of Columbia Law School
- Sophia Moreau - professor of law and philosophy at NYU Law
- Neil Seeman - professor of health policy at University of Toronto, author
- Martha Jackman - constitutional law scholar, professor of law
- Camille A. Nelson (1994) — dean of the William S. Richardson School of Law (University of Hawaiʻi at Mānoa, 2020–present); former dean of American University Washington College of Law
- Kevin E. Davis - professor of law, faculty director NYU Law
- Sujit Choudhry (1996) - former dean of Berkeley Law
- Edward Iacobucci — professor of law, former dean of the Faculty of Law (2015-2020)
- Katrina Wyman (1999) - professor of law, NYU Law
- Mayo Moran (1999) - dean of the Faculty of Law (2006-2014), constitutional law scholar
- Benjamin Alarie (2002) — professor of law
- Robert Leckey - former dean of McGill University Faculty of Law
- Ernest Weinrib — professor of law

=== Other ===
- Joseph Burr Tyrrell (1880) — geologist, explorer and cartographer
- Ivy Lawrence Maynier (1945) — lawyer, educator, diplomatic hostess
- Herbert Solway, QC (1955) — chair of the Toronto Blue Jays
- Hal Jackman (1956) — Lieutenant Governor of Ontario (1991–1997), chancellor of the University of Toronto (1997–2002)
- Allan Leibel (1970) — Canadian Olympic Sailor
- Garth Drabinsky (1973) — theatre mogul, co-founder of Cineplex Theatres
- George Strathy (1974) — Chief Justice of Ontario (2014 - present)
- Ralph Simmonds (1976) — law lecturer at the University of Windsor, then McGill University, and then justice of the Supreme Court of Western Australia
- Stephen Stohn (1977) — television producer (Degrassi franchise)
- Sir Nicholas Green (LLM 1981) — judge of the Court of Appeal of England and Wales (2018–present)
- David Shore (1982) — television writer, creator, executive producer (House, The Good Doctor)
- Maureen Kempston Darkes (1973) - President of General Motors Latin America, Africa and Middle East
- N. Murray Edwards (1983) - owner of the Calgary Flames, oil sands financier
- Ed Morgan (1984) — judge and former professor
- Todd Ducharme (1986) - first Métis to be appointed to the Ontario Superior Court of Justice
- Nigel S. Wright (1988) — businessman, Chief of staff for Prime Minister Stephen Harper
- Guy Giorno (1989) — chief of staff for Premier of Ontario Mike Harris, chief of staff for Prime Minister Stephen Harper
- Leonard Asper (1989) - President and chief executive of Canwest Global Communications
- Ritu Khullar (1991) - Chief Justice of the Court of Appeal of Alberta
- Andrew Pyper - writer of fiction, winner of the Arthur Ellis Award for Lost Girls
- Charlotta Schlyter (1995) - Swedish diplomat
- Nicholas Devlin (LLM 1998) — Justice of the Court of King's Bench of Alberta (2019–present)
- Mark Wiseman (1998) - current Canadian Ambassador to the United States, political strategist, financier, advisor to Mark Carney
- Newton Glassman - co-founder of Catalyst Capital Group, financier

== See also ==
- List of law schools in Canada
