= Nicholas Terpstra =

Canadian historian and academic

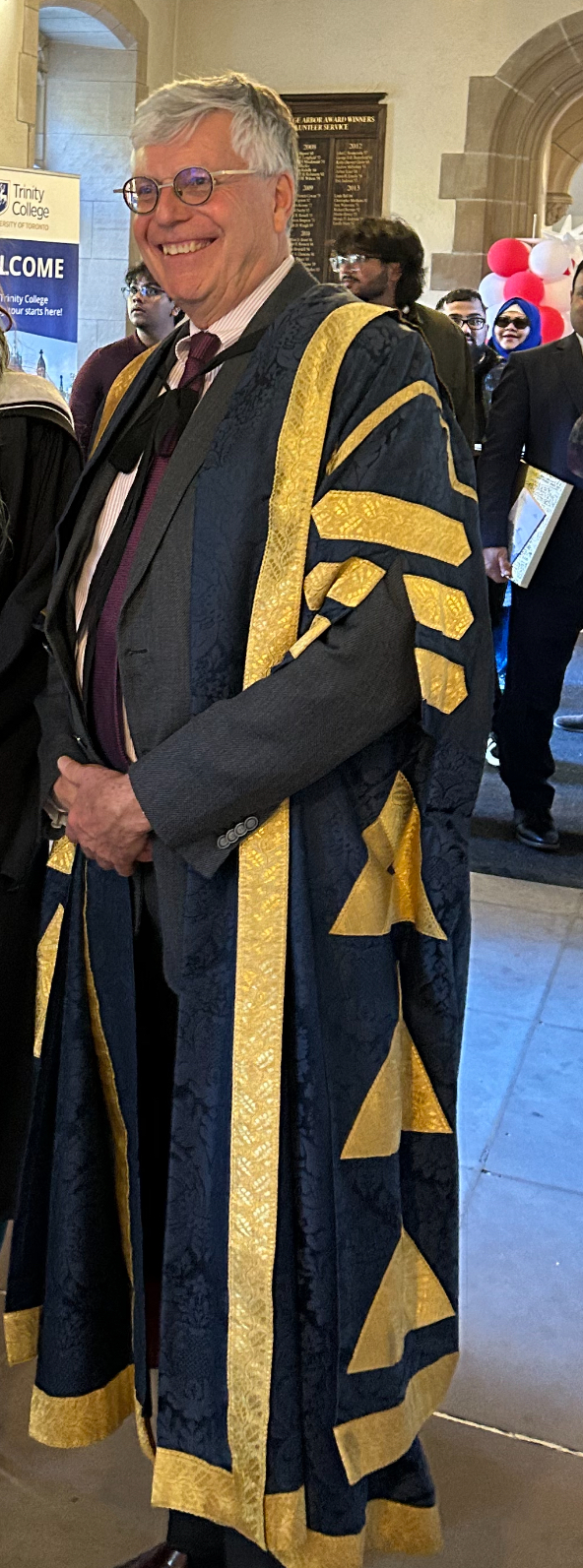
- Nicholas Terpstra posing with a student at a Fall 2025 graduation ceremony inside Trinity College

16th Provost of Trinity College, Toronto
- Incumbent
- Assumed office July 1, 2024
- Chancellor: Brian Lawson
- Preceded by: Mayo Moran

Personal details
- Education: McMaster University (BA); University of Toronto (MA, PhD)
- Occupation: Professor; Historian; Administrator
- Website: Nicholas Terpstra

Nicholas Terpstra is a Canadian historian and academic. He is the 16th and current provost and vice-chancellor of Trinity College, Toronto, having succeeded Mayo Moran in 2024. He has been the president of the Renaissance Society of America (2022-2024), editor of Renaissance Quarterly (2012-2017; 2021-2022), and is an internationally respected scholar of the Renaissance period. As a professor of history at the University of Toronto, his research is multidisciplinary, interacting with gender, religion, economics, and more.

== Academic research ==
Much of Terpstra’s work has been at the intersections of politics, gender, charity, and religion. Books include Cultures of Charity: Women, Politics, and the Reform of Poor Relief in Renaissance Italy (Harvard: 2013) which won the Marraro Prize in Italian History of the American Historical Association and the Phyllis Goodhart Gordan Book Prize of the Renaissance Society of America; Lost Girls: Sex and Death in Renaissance Florence (Johns Hopkins: 2010); Abandoned Children of the Italian Renaissance: Orphan Care in Florence and Bologna (Johns Hopkins: 2005); and Lost & Found: Locating Foundlings in the Early Modern World (Harvard University Press: 2024).

More recent work addresses the intersection of spatial and sensory history in the early modern period, particularly as regards how different communities interacted in the early stages of global expansion and colonialism: Senses of Space in the Early Modern World (Cambridge University Press: 2024). This extends out of research on some of the early modern origins of the global refugee crisis, as described in Religious Refugees in the Early Modern World (Cambridge: 2015), and Global Reformations: Transforming Early Modern Religions, Societies, and Cultures (Routledge: 2019).

He has also been the lead, together with Colin Rose (Brock University) in digital humanities project to digitally map social and spatial relations in sixteenth century Florence, known as the DECIMA (Digitally Encoded Census Information and Mapping Archive). The online map has generated a large and expanding suite of focused research projects on particular aspects of early modern urban history and is further described in Mapping Space, Sense, and Movement in Florence: Historical GIS and the Early Modern City (Routledge: 2016).
