= Ernest Weinrib =

- Born: Ernest J. Weinrib
- Awards: Killam Prize (2009)

Academic background
- Education: University of Toronto (BA, JD); Harvard University PhD

Academic work
- Institutions: University of Toronto
- Notable works: The Idea of Private Law; Corrective Justice
- Website: utoronto.ca

Ernest J. Weinrib is a Canadian legal academic who works on jurisprudence and legal philosophy, particularly the theory of private law. He teaches at the University of Toronto Faculty of Law.

== Theories ==
In Weinrib's theories he sees the world of private law (that is tort, contract and restitution) as being composed of "bilateral relationships between individuals whereby one person's right is always a function of another person's duty".

Because of this he argues that private law cannot explain factors like punitive damages and other remedies used for behavior modification. Private law he argues is an ends to itself and not a means to some other particularly political, economic or social change. The only purpose, he says, for "private law, is to be private law".

Weinrib sees that private law "regards the parties to a lawsuit as active and passive poles of the same injustice. The injustice [occurs] in a disruption of the parties’ equality, whereby each party has what is rightfully his or hers."

== Writing ==
- Weinrib, Ernest J., 1980, "The Case for a Duty to Rescue", Yale Law Journal, 90: 247–93.
- Weinrib, Ernest J., 1987, "Causation and Wrongdoing", Chicago-Kent Law Review], 63: 407–50.
- Weinrib, Ernest J., 1988, "The Special Morality of Tort Law", McGill Law Journal, 34: 403–13.
- Weinrib, Ernest J., 1989a, "Right and Advantage in Private Law", Cardozo Law Review, 10: 1283–1310.
- Weinrib, Ernest J., 1989b, "Understanding Tort Law", Valparaiso Law Review, 23: 485–526.
- Correlativity, Personality, and the Emerging Consensus on Corrective Justice by Ernest J Weinrib (2001) (Theoretical Inquiries in Law)
- Weinrib, Ernest J., 1992, "Corrective Justice", Iowa Law Review, 77: 403–26.
- Weinrib, Ernest J., 1995a, "The Gains and Losses of Corrective Justice", Duke Law Review, 44: 277–97.
- Weinrib, Ernest J., 1995b, The Idea of Private Law, (Harvard University Press, 2002),
- Ernest J Weinrib, Correlativity, Personality, and the Emerging Consensus on Corrective Justice by (Theoretical Inquiries in Law, 2001)
- Ernest J. Weinrib, Corrective Justice in a Nutshell The University of Toronto Law Journal Vol. 52, No. 4 (Autumn, 2002), pp. 349–356
- Weinrib Ernest J., Deterrence and Corrective Justice (2002) (UCLA Law Rev)
- Weinrib, Ernest J., 2012, Corrective Justice, Oxford: (Oxford University Press, 2012).
- Weinrib, Ernest J., 2022, Reciprocal Freedom: Private Law and Public Right (Oxford University Press), ISBN 9780198754183.
