= Jutta Brunnée =

Canadian law professor

11th Dean of the Henry N.R. Jackman Faculty of Law
- In office January 1, 2021 – February 1, 2026
- Preceded by: Edward Iacobucci
- Succeeded by: Christopher Essert
- Interim; January 1, 2014 – January 1, 2015
- Preceded by: Mayo Moran
- Succeeded by: Edward Iacobucci

Personal details
- Education: Schulich School of Law (LLM); Johannes Gutenberg University Mainz (LLD)

Jutta Brunnée is a scholar of international and environmental law who is a university professor and the Metcalf Chair in Environmental Law at the Henry N.R. Jackman Faculty of Law of the University of Toronto. In December 2020, she was named the dean of the Faculty of Law, a position she held from January 1, 2021 to February 1, 2026.

Brunnée received a doctorate in law at the Johannes Gutenberg University Mainz and an LLM from the Schulich School of Law at Dalhousie University, the latter in 1987. She taught at McGill University Faculty of Law from 1990 to 1995, and at the University of British Columbia Faculty of Law (later renamed Peter A. Allard School of Law) from 1995 to 2000. She began teaching at the University of Toronto in 2000, and has remained there since.

Ingrid Wuerth describes Brunnée's view in international law theory as constructivist.

== Publications ==
- Brunnée, Jutta (1988). Acid Rain and Ozone Layer Depletion: International Law and Regulation. Transnational Publishers. ISBN 0-941320-51-0. OCLC 17439633.
- Brunnée, Jutta; Toope, Stephen J. (2010). Legitimacy and Legality in International Law: An Interactional Account. Cambridge University Press. doi:10.1017/cbo9780511781261. ISBN 978-0-511-78126-1.
- Bodansky, Daniel; Brunnée, Jutta; Lavanya, Rajamani (2017). International Climate Change Law. Oxford University Press. ISBN 978-0-19-966429-0. OCLC 990144163.
