= Ronald St. John Macdonald =

Canadian academic (1928–2006)

8th Dean of Dalhousie Law School
- In office 1972–1979
- Preceded by: Murray Fraser
- Succeeded by: William H. Charles

3rd Dean of the University of Toronto Faculty of Law
- In office 1965–1972
- Preceded by: Cecil Wright
- Succeeded by: Martin Friedland

Personal details
- Born: August 20, 1928 Montreal, Quebec
- Died: September 7, 2006 (aged 78) Halifax, Nova Scotia
- Awards: Order of Canada

Ronald St. John Macdonald, CC (August 20, 1928 – September 7, 2006) was a Canadian legal academic and jurist.

== Early life and education ==
Born in Montreal, the son of R. St. John Macdonald and Elizabeth Smith, he served as a Sub-Lieutenant in the Royal Canadian Navy (Reserve) during World War II. When he returned to Canada he received a Bachelor of Arts degree in 1949 from St. Francis Xavier University, a Bachelor of Laws degree in 1952 from Dalhousie Law School, and two Master of Laws degrees, from the University of London in 1954, and from Harvard Law School in 1955.

== Career ==
He then began a long legal academic career at Osgoode Hall Law School of York University (1955 to 1959), the University of Western Ontario (1959 to 1961), the University of Toronto (1961 to 1972), and finally Dalhousie University (1972 to 1990). He was also Dean of Law at the University of Toronto from 1967 to 1972 and at Dalhousie University from 1972 to 1979.

He was the only non-European judge of the European Court of Human Rights, where he served from 1980 to 1998. He was the first Westerner appointed as Honorary Professor of Law at China's Peking University. He is the founding President of the Canadian Council on International Law and was President of the World Academy of Art and Science from 1983 to 1987.

In 1984, he was made an Officer of the Order of Canada and was promoted to Companion in 2000. In 1999, he was awarded the Canadian Bar Association's Ramon John Hnatyshyn Award for Law in recognition of "outstanding contribution to the law or legal scholarship in Canada". He also was awarded honorary degrees from McGill University, Dalhousie University, St Francis Xavier University, and Carleton University.

== Death ==
He died in Halifax on September 7, 2006.
