= Martin Friedland =

Canadian lawyer, academic and author (born 1932)

Martin Lawrence Friedland

4th Dean of the University of Toronto Faculty of Law
- In office 1972–1979
- Preceded by: Ronald St. John Macdonald
- Succeeded by: Frank Iacobucci

Personal details
- Born: September 21, 1932 (age 94) Toronto, Ontario
- Citizenship: Canadian
- Spouse: Judith Fern Friedland
- Children: Thomas Friedland, Jennifer Friedland, Nancy Friedland
- Education: University of Toronto; University of Cambridge
- Known for: Contributions to the Canadian legal system and to the administration of justice

Martin Lawrence Friedland, CC QC FRSC (born September 21, 1932) is a Canadian lawyer, academic and author.

He received a BComm. (1955), LL.B. (1958), and honorary LL.D. from the University of Toronto, and a PhD (1968) and LL.D from Cambridge University. He was called to the Ontario Bar in 1960. He taught at Osgoode Hall Law School until 1965 when he joined the University of Toronto Faculty of Law as an associate professor. He was promoted to professor in 1968 and served as dean from 1972–1979.

He was appointed a Fellow of the Royal Society of Canada in 1983. In 1990 he was made an Officer of the Order of Canada and was promoted to Companion in 2003. He was awarded the Molson Prize in 1994. In 2003 he was awarded the Sir John William Dawson Medal, for important contributions of knowledge in multiple domains, by the Royal Society of Canada. He received an honorary LL.D from York University in 2003.

== Selected works ==
- A Place Apart: Judicial Independence and Accountability in Canada
- Access to the Law
- Detention before Trial
- Double Jeopardy
- The Case of Valentine Shortis
- The Death of Old Man Rice
- The Trials of Israel Lipski
- The University of Toronto: A History (University of Toronto Press, 2002, second edition, 2013 ISBN 0-8020-4429-8)
- My Life in Crime and Other Academic Adventures
- Searching for W.P.M. Kennedy: The Biography of an Enigma (2020)

== Sources ==
- "About Martin L. Friedland". University of Toronto Press. Archived from the original on January 22, 2005.
- "Martin Friedland". University of Toronto. Archived from the original on November 18, 2003.
