= Mayo Moran =

Canadian legal scholar

15th Provost of Trinity College, Toronto
- In office June 6, 2014 – July 1, 2024
- Chancellor: Bill Graham; Brian Lawson
- Preceded by: Andy Orchard
- Succeeded by: Nicholas Terpstra

9th Dean of the University of Toronto Faculty of Law
- In office January 1, 2006 – January 1, 2014
- Preceded by: Ron Daniels
- Succeeded by: Jutta Brunnée (interim)

Personal details
- Born: June 2, 1959 (age 67) Prince George, British Columbia
- Education: University of British Columbia (B.A.) (B.Ed.); McGill University (LL.B.); University of Michigan (LL.M.)
- Occupation: Professor; Lawyer; Administrator
- Website: Mayo Moran

Mayo Moran (born June 2, 1957) is a Canadian lawyer and academic. From 2006 to 2014, she was dean of the Faculty of Law at the University of Toronto. She was the first female dean of that faculty. In addition, from 2014 to 2024 she was the Provost of Trinity College, Toronto.

== Early life ==
Moran is a native of the Canadian province of British Columbia. She was born on June 2, 1959, to Bridget Moran, then a social worker, later a writer, and Pat Moran.

Moran completed her LL.B. at McGill University (1990) and subsequently obtained an LL.M. from the University of Michigan (1992) and an S.J.D. from the University of Toronto (1999). She attended the University of British Columbia for her B.A. (1980, English and Sociology) and teacher training (1981) and subsequently taught at a secondary school in Prince George, British Columbia before attending law school.

== Academic career ==
Moran is active in the fields of constitutional law, private law, and legal and feminist theory. She has worked on cases involving claims under the Canadian Charter of Rights and Freedoms equality guarantee and redress for historic injustice such as the Chinese Canadian Head Tax claim. She currently teaches first-year tort law at the Faculty of Law.

She has been Dean of the Faculty of Law of the University of Toronto since January 1, 2006, the first ever female dean of the Faculty of Law. She replaced former dean Ronald J. Daniels, who went on to become President of Johns Hopkins University. On July 1, 2014, she joined Trinity College, Toronto as the 15th Provost, replacing Andy Orchard. He had taken up the position of Rawlinson and Bosworth Professor of Anglo-Saxon at the University of Oxford.

At the University of Toronto, she serves as Chair of the Deans of Single Departmental Faculties, and is a member of numerous committees including the Provost's executive committee and the President's Special Advisory Committee on Asset Management.

As Dean, Moran regarded upgrading the physical building of the Law School as her biggest challenge, along with budgetary considerations.

She has also served outside the University of Toronto in various capacities including as an External Reviewer of University of British Columbia Faculty of Law. Since 2007 she has also been the Chair of the Independent Assessment Process Oversight Committee that attempts to assist in the implementation of the Indian Residential Schools Agreement.

Academic offices
Preceded by Andy Orchard	Provost of Trinity College, Toronto; 2014-Present	Incumbent
