= David Dyzenhaus =

Canadian jurist

Professor David Dyzenhaus FRSC
- Born: Johannesburg, South Africa
- Occupations: Professor of Law and Philosophy
- Awards: Corresponding Fellow of the British Academy

Academic background
- Education: University of the Witwatersrand (BA, LLB); University of Oxford (DPhil)

Academic work
- Discipline: Jurist; Philosopher
- Institutions: University of Toronto

Professor David Dyzenhaus FRSC (born 29 September 1957) is a South African-born, Canadian jurist who is currently Professor of Law and Philosophy at the University of Toronto, holding the Albert Abel Chair of Law.

== Early life ==
Born to Jewish family in Johannesburg, Republic of South Africa, Dyzenhaus was educated at the University of the Witwatersrand, where he studied for his Bachelor of Arts and Bachelor of Laws degrees. He attained a Doctor of Philosophy degree from the University of Oxford.

Dyzenhaus also served in the South African Defence Force from 1980 to 1982.
