= History of the Toronto Blue Jays =

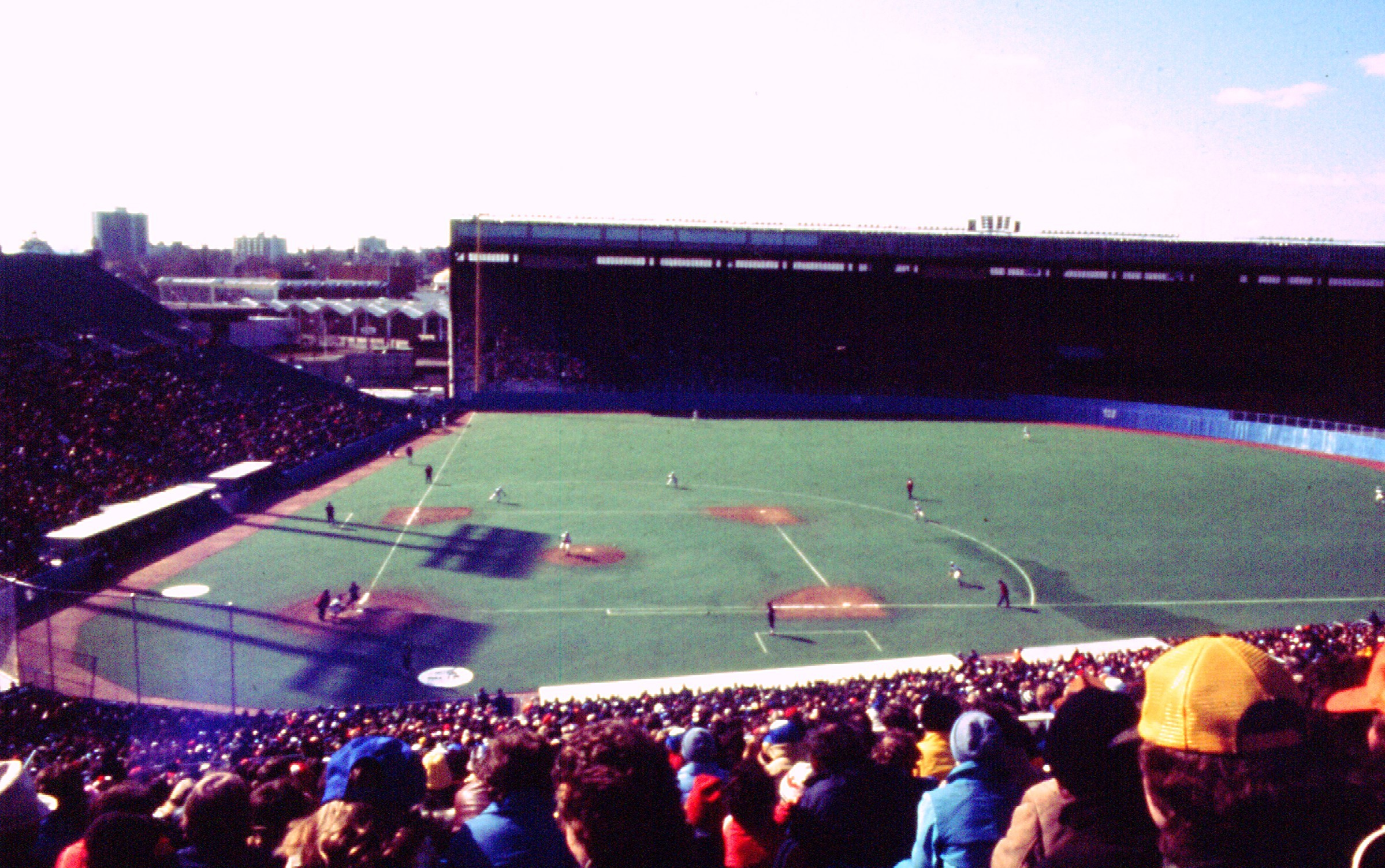
The Blue Jays' second game in franchise history, played on April 9, 1977, against the Chicago White Sox at Exhibition Stadium. Unlike the first game, which was played in a snow storm two days earlier, the second game was played during sunny weather.

The Toronto Blue Jays came into existence in 1976, as one of two teams slated to join the American League for the following season, via the 1977 Major League Baseball expansion.

Toronto had been mentioned as a potential major league city as early as the 1880s, and been home to the Toronto Maple Leafs baseball team of the International League, from 1896 to 1967. In January 1976, the San Francisco Giants nearly relocated to Toronto after owner Horace Stoneham agreed to sell the team to a Canadian consortium. The group, which included Labatt Breweries of Canada, The Globe and Mail's Howard Webster, and the Canadian Imperial Bank of Commerce (CIBC), planned to rebrand the team as the Toronto Giants and play at Exhibition Stadium. However, a court ruling halted the move, and the Giants remained in San Francisco. Despite this setback, Toronto's ambition for an MLB team persisted, leading to their successful bid in the 1976 American League expansion, driven by a need to balance the league after Seattle was granted a team as a result of a lawsuit over their loss of the Pilots.

The new Toronto franchise, purchased for $7 million, was named the Toronto Blue Jays following a contest that attracted over 4,000 suggestions. The name reflected Toronto's tradition of using blue in team colors and was influenced by majority owner Labatt Breweries' flagship beer, Labatt Blue. The franchise's first employee, Paul Beeston, began as vice president of business operations, and before the inaugural 1977 season, Peter Bavasi and Pat Gillick were appointed as president and assistant general manager, respectively. The Blue Jays debuted on April 7, 1977, with a win against the Chicago White Sox amid a snowstorm, marking the beginning of a journey from early struggles to eventual success. Throughout the late 1970s and early 1980s, the Blue Jays showed gradual improvement, highlighted by their first winning season in 1983. The team's fortunes rose significantly under manager Bobby Cox in 1985, when they won their first American League East title. The late 1980s and early 1990s, under manager Cito Gaston, were particularly successful, with the Blue Jays winning multiple division titles and back-to-back World Series championships in 1992 and 1993, making them the first team outside the US to achieve this feat. Key players during this era included Roberto Alomar, Joe Carter, and Dave Stieb.

After the mid-1990s strike and subsequent downturn, the Blue Jays faced challenges but also saw the rise of talents like Roy Halladay and Carlos Delgado. The late 1990s brought brief revitalization with the acquisition of Roger Clemens. In the early 2000s, general manager J.P. Ricciardi led a rebuilding phase, culminating in a competitive roster by the mid-2000s. The team's resurgence in the 2010s featured playoff appearances in 2015 and 2016, driven by stars like José Bautista and Josh Donaldson. The Blue Jays continue to build for future success, with young talents like Vladimir Guerrero Jr. and Bo Bichette leading the charge. The Blue Jays made the 2025 World Series, though they lost in it, making it the first World Series loss in franchise history.

== Creation of the Blue Jays ==
In 1974, the Toronto City Council approved a further CA$2.8 million for renovations to Exhibition Stadium, to retrofit it to accommodate baseball and help attract a Major League Baseball (MLB) team.

=== Possible Toronto Giants ===
In January 1976, San Francisco Giants owner Horace Stoneham agreed to sell the team for $13.25 million to a Toronto group which was led by Don McDougall and consisted of Labatt Breweries of Canada, Ltd., Vulcan Assets Ltd. – owned by The Globe and Mail chairman and president Howard Webster – and Canadian Imperial Bank of Commerce (CIBC). The team was to have begun play in the 1976 season at Exhibition Stadium on the CNE grounds, and would have been called the Toronto Giants. However, the plan to move the Giants was quashed by a U.S. court. Following the court ruling, Bob Lurie purchased the Giants and kept them in San Francisco.

=== American League expansion ===
MLB decided to expand in 1976 to settle a lawsuit filed by the local governments in Seattle, Washington, against the American League for breach of contract, due to the relocation in 1970 of their Seattle Pilots to Milwaukee as the Brewers after only one season. To keep the league with an even number of teams with the addition of a new Seattle expansion franchise, a formal expansion proceeding was held, with a second team being awarded to the city of Toronto. A consortium composed of Labatt Breweries (45%), Webster (45%) and CIBC (10%), purchased the rights for the franchise from MLB for $7 million.

However, even after the franchises were awarded, the future of baseball in Toronto appeared uncertain. Then-U.S. President Gerald Ford had attempted to put pressure on MLB to give Washington, D.C., an expansion franchise instead of Toronto. Washington had been without Major League Baseball since the Senators were moved to Arlington, Texas to become the Texas Rangers following the 1972 season (and would continue to do so until 2005 when Canada's first MLB team, the Montreal Expos relocated to Washington, D.C., to become the Nationals). Following this development there was brief speculation by Metro Toronto chairman Paul Godfrey, among others, that Washington would be awarded Toronto's American League franchise and Toronto would instead be awarded a National League expansion franchise. However, Ford's attempts did not amount to anything and Toronto was allowed to keep its American League expansion franchise.

The Blue Jays and Mariners were approved as part of the 1977 Major League Baseball expansion discussions. The team was represented by legal counsel Herb Solway and Gord Kirke. Kirke prepared the original documents which led to the foundation of the team in 1976.

The franchise's first employee was Paul Beeston, who began work in 1976 as the vice president of business operations. Beeston later served as president of the Blue Jays and MLB; he eventually returned to the Blue Jays as president in 2008, before retiring at the conclusion of the 2015 season.

Before the team's inaugural season in 1977, Peter Bavasi was chosen to be the president and general manager while Pat Gillick was named assistant general manager.

=== Naming the team ===
The name "Blue Jays" came about in 1976, when the team held a "name the team" contest, which involved more than 4,000 suggestions. 154 people suggested the name "Blue Jays" and Dr. William Mills, a periodontist from Etobicoke, was selected from a draw as the grand winner. Mills stated that it was traditional for a Toronto-based sports team to have the colour blue as its primary colour and following the leads of the Baltimore Orioles and St. Louis Cardinals that the team be named after a bird. Another theory was that "Blue Jays" was chosen by majority owner Labatt Breweries—an apparent tie-in with its feature brand, Labatt Blue. However, it is very likely that the team would have used blue as one of its colours in any event; blue had been the primary colour for many of Toronto's top-level teams (the Toronto Raptors and Toronto FC, which both came into existence much later, would break with this tradition with both adopting red as their primary colours) since the Toronto Argonauts adopted it in 1873. The Blue Jays nickname was previously used (albeit unofficially) by the Philadelphia Phillies during the 1940s.

== 1977–1994: Pat Gillick era ==
=== 1977–1981 ===
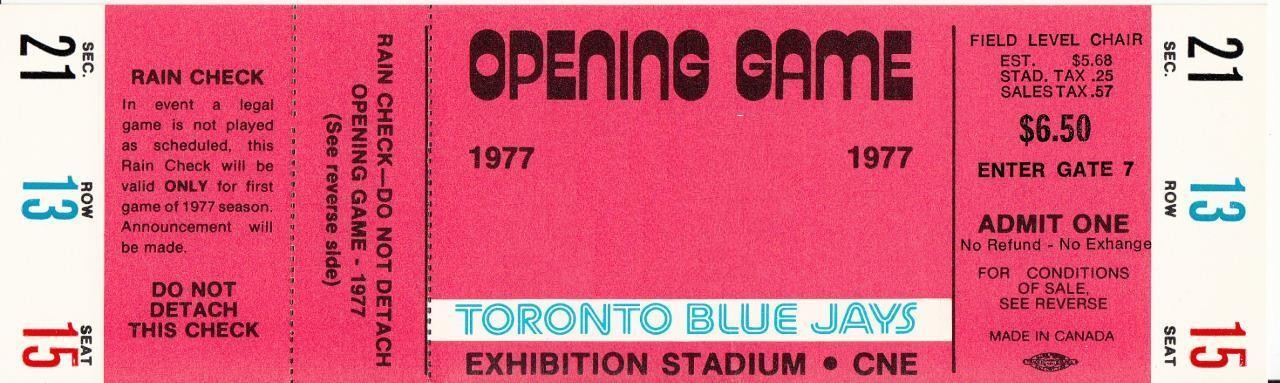
A ticket from the Blue Jays' first-ever regular-season game

The Blue Jays played their first game on April 7, 1977, against the Chicago White Sox, before a home crowd of 44,649. The game is remembered for the minor snowstorm which began just before the game started. Toronto won the snowy affair, 9–5, led by Doug Ault's two home runs. That win was one of only 54 of the 1977 season, as the Blue Jays finished in last place in the AL East, with a record of 54–107. After the season, Gillick became general manager of the team, a position he held until 1994.

In 1978, the team improved their record by five games, but remained last with a record of 59–102. In 1979, after a 53–109 last-place finish, shortstop Alfredo Griffin was named American League co-Rookie of the Year. In addition, the Blue Jays' first mascot, BJ Birdy, made its debut in 1979.

In 1980, Bobby Mattick became manager, succeeding Roy Hartsfield, the Blue Jays' original manager. Mattick began the 1980 season with the goal of losing fewer than 100 games for the first time in the team's brief history. For a brief time during the early part of the season, the Blue Jays battled with the New York Yankees for first place in the AL East, before they tumbled during the summer back to the bottom of the standings. Still, the Blue Jays almost reached the 70-win mark, finishing with a record of 67–95, a 14-win improvement on 1979, and achieving Mattick's goal of fewer than 100 losses. Jim Clancy led with 13 wins and John Mayberry became the first Jay to hit 30 home runs in a season.

In the strike-divided season of 1981, the Blue Jays again finished in last place in the American League East, in both halves of the season. They were 16–42 in the first half, but improved dramatically, finishing the 48-game second half at 21–27, for a combined record of 37–69. After the season, Mattick stepped down as manager, but remained with the team as executive co-ordinator of baseball operations, eventually being promoted to vice president of baseball in 1984.

=== 1982–1984 ===
Under new manager Bobby Cox, Toronto continued to improve in 1982, finishing 78–84. The team tied Cleveland for sixth place in the AL East, marking the first time they had not been worse than every other team in the division. Their pitching staff was led by starters Dave Stieb, Jim Clancy and Luis Leal, and the outfield featured a young Lloyd Moseby and Jesse Barfield. First baseman Willie Upshaw became the first Blue Jay to have at least 100 RBIs in a season.

In 1983, the Blue Jays made an even bigger breakthrough, leading the AL East for most of the summer (including at the All-Star break) before tailing off during August and September; in the end, the club did compile their first winning record, 89–73, finishing in fourth place, nine games behind the eventual World Series champion Baltimore Orioles. It was the first of 11 straight winning seasons for the team.

The Blue Jays' continued to climb in 1984, finishing with the same 89–73 record, but this time in a distant second place behind another World Series champion, the Detroit Tigers. After the 1984 campaign, Alfredo Griffin was traded to the Oakland Athletics, thus giving a permanent spot to young Dominican shortstop Tony Fernández, who became a fan favourite for many years.

=== 1985: First AL East title ===
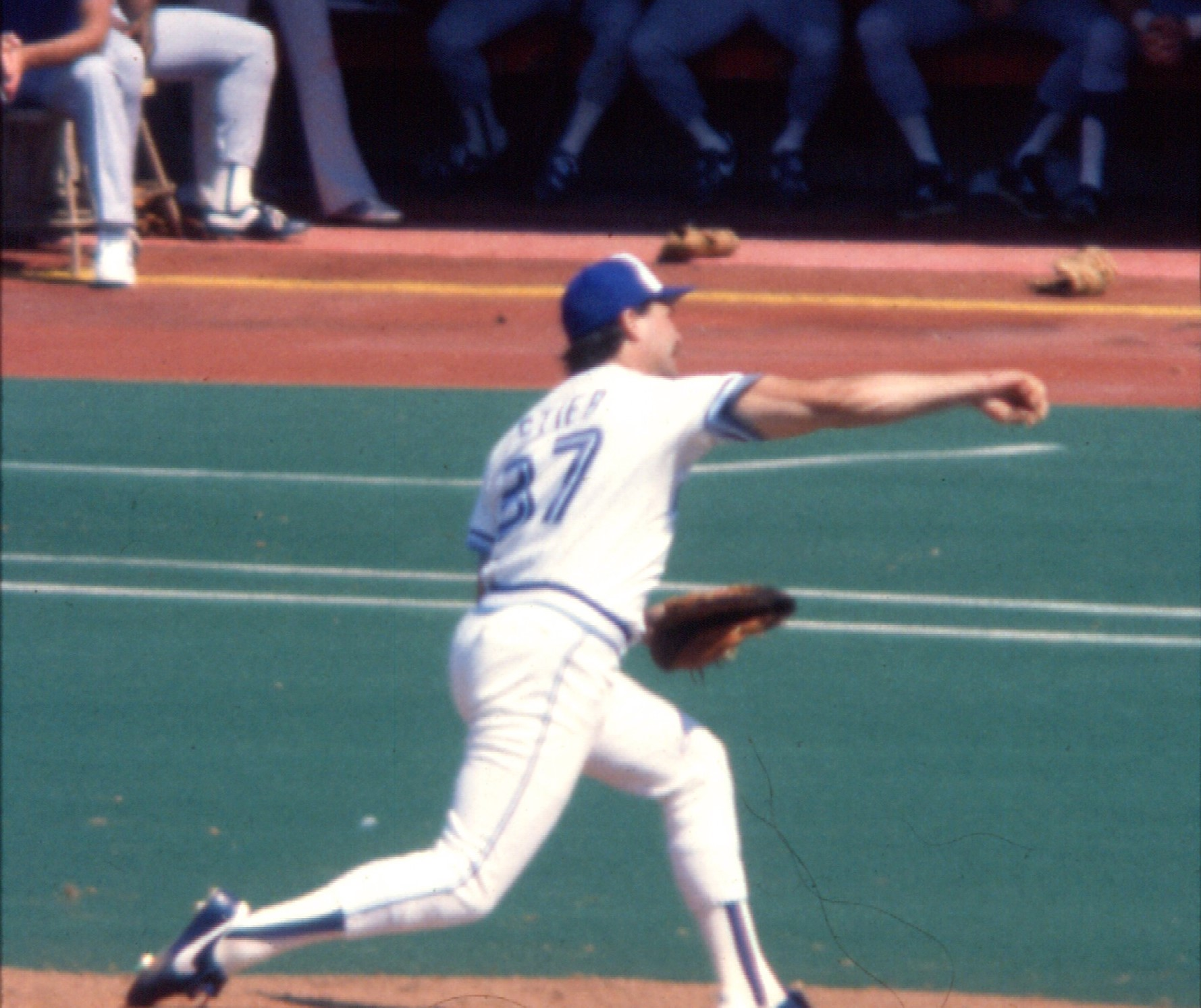
Dave Stieb has the second-highest number of wins among pitchers in the 1980s.

In 1985, Toronto won their first championship of any sort: the first of their six American League East division titles. The Blue Jays featured strong pitching and a balanced offense. Their mid-season call-up of relief pitcher Tom Henke also proved to be important. They finished 99–62 (the franchise record for most wins), two games in front of the New York Yankees. The Blue Jays faced the Kansas City Royals in the American League Championship Series (ALCS), and took a 3 games to 1 lead. However, Kansas City won three consecutive games to win the series, 4 games to 3, on their way to their first World Series championship. Shortly after the loss in the ALCS, Bobby Cox left the Blue Jays to return to his former club, the Atlanta Braves, as general manager.

=== 1986–1988 ===
With Jimy Williams now the skipper, the Blue Jays could not duplicate their success in 1986, sliding to a fourth-place tie at 86–76. Jesse Barfield and George Bell led the way with 40 and 31 home runs respectively and Jimmy Key and Jim Clancy tied for the team wins lead with 14 each.

In 1987, the Blue Jays lost a division race to the Detroit Tigers by two games, after being swept on the last weekend of the season by the Tigers, ending the season with seven straight losses. The Blue Jays finished with a 96–66 record, second best in the major leagues. However, George Bell was named Most Valuable Player (MVP) of the American League. Bell was the first MVP in Blue Jays history, and remained the franchise's only winner until Josh Donaldson won the award in 2015.

In 1988, however, Toronto did not duplicate the successes of the previous season, tying the Milwaukee Brewers for third in the division at 87–75. Still, the season had numerous highlights. First baseman Fred McGriff hit 34 home runs, and Dave Stieb had back-to-back starts in which he lost a no-hitter with two out and two strikes in the ninth inning.

=== 1989–1991: A new stadium, Cito Gaston takes charge, and two more AL East titles ===
In 1989, the Blue Jays' new retractable roofed home, SkyDome, opened mid-season in June. It also marked the beginning of an extremely successful five-year period for the team. In May, management fired manager Jimy Williams and replaced him with Cito Gaston, the team's popular hitting instructor. The club had a 12–24 record at the time of the firing, but went 77–49 under Gaston to win the American League East title by two games. On May 28, 1989, the Blue Jays played their final game at Exhibition Stadium against the Chicago White Sox, who coincidentally were the Blue Jays' opponents in their first game in franchise history, at the same stadium, 12 years earlier; the Blue Jays won, 7–5, in 10 innings. After a brief week-long road trip, the first game at the new stadium took place on June 5 against the Milwaukee Brewers, which the Jays lost, 5–3. In the 1989 American League Championship Series, Rickey Henderson led the Oakland Athletics to a 4–1 series win.

In 1990, the Blue Jays finished in second place, two games behind the Boston Red Sox. Dave Stieb pitched his only no-hitter, beating the Cleveland Indians 3–0 in front of a less than capacity crowd at Cleveland Municipal Stadium. This was also, as of 2023, the only no-hitter ever pitched by a Toronto Blue Jay pitcher. During the offseason, the Blue Jays made one of the two biggest trades in franchise history, sending all-star shortstop Tony Fernández and first baseman Fred McGriff to the San Diego Padres in exchange for outfielder Joe Carter and second baseman Roberto Alomar. The Blue Jays also obtained center fielder Devon White from the California Angels. These deals, particularly the trade with San Diego, were instrumental in the team's future success.

Carter, Alomar and White were extremely effective additions, as the Blue Jays again won the division in 1991, as Carter drove in the division winning run. Once again, however, they fell short in the postseason, losing to the Minnesota Twins, who were on their way to their second World Series victory in five seasons, in the ALCS. In 1991, the Blue Jays became the first Major League club ever to draw over four million fans in one season. In early November 1991, Labatt announced that it had acquired the 45% ownership stake in the team held by Webster's estate (who had died the previous year) for $67.5 million, giving it 90% of the club with CIBC owning the remaining 10%.

- Team record 1989: 89 wins–73 losses, W%- 0.549
- Team record 1990: 86 wins–76 losses, W%- 0.531, 2 games behind division leader
- Team record 1991: 91 wins–71 losses, W%- 0.562

=== 1992–1993: World Series champions ===
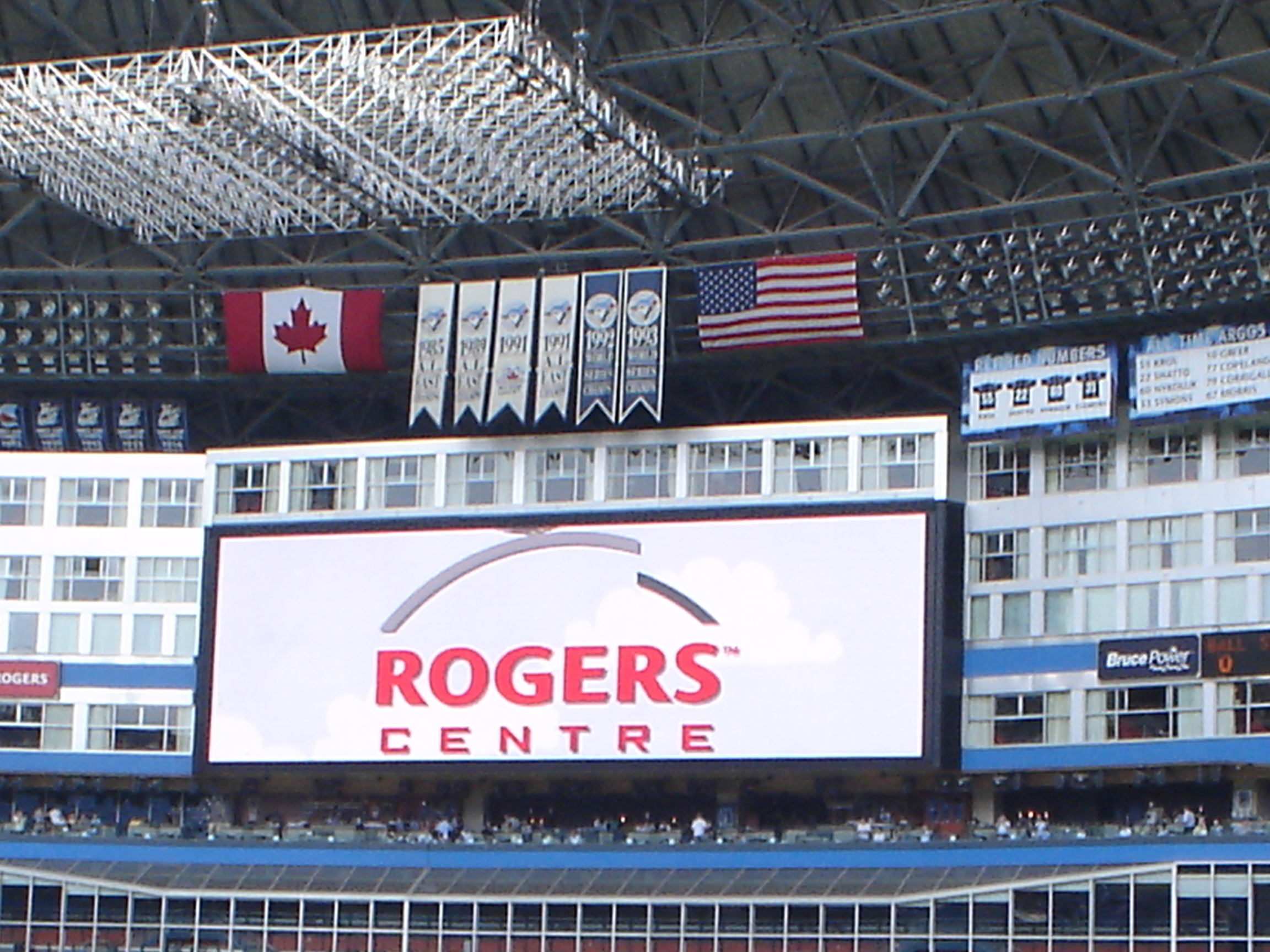
World Series banners above the Rogers Centre videoboard

==== 1992: Toronto's first World Series title ====
After the 1991 season had ended, the Blue Jays acquired pitcher Jack Morris, who had led the Minnesota Twins to victory in the World Series by pitching a 10-inning complete game shutout in Game 7 and had been named the World Series MVP. To add veteran leadership to their explosive offense, Toronto signed future Hall of Famer Dave Winfield to be the team's designated hitter.

The 1992 regular season went well, as the Blue Jays clinched their second straight AL East crown with a final record of 96–66, four games ahead of the Milwaukee Brewers. They also went the entire season without being swept in any series. The Blue Jays met the Oakland Athletics (who had the same record as the Blue Jays and led the division by six games over the defending champion Twins) in the ALCS, winning 4 games to 2. The pivotal game of the series was Game 4, considered by many to be one of the most important games in Blue Jays history: the Blue Jays rallied back from a 6–1 deficit after seven innings, capped off by Roberto Alomar's huge game-tying 2-run homer off Hall of Fame Athletics closer Dennis Eckersley in the top of the ninth. This paved the way for a 7–6 victory in 11 innings, a 3 games to 1 lead in the series and an eventual 4–2 ALCS series win.

The Blue Jays then faced the Atlanta Braves in the World Series. The pivotal game in this series turned out to be Game 2, in which reserve player Ed Sprague hit a 9th-inning 2-run home run off Braves closer Jeff Reardon to give the Blue Jays a 5–4 lead, which held up. After winning Game 3 thanks to Candy Maldonado's ninth inning RBI hit and Game 4 due to Jimmy Key's superb 7 1/3 inning pitching effort in which he retired 15 straight batters (five innings), the Jays could not win the Series on home turf as the Braves struck back with a 7–2 win in Game 5. Game 6 in Atlanta, with the Blue Jays leading 3 games to 2, was a very close game. Toronto was one strike away from winning in the bottom of the 9th inning, 2–1, but Otis Nixon singled in the tying run off the Blue Jays' closer Tom Henke. It was the first run the Toronto bullpen had given up in the series. The game was decided in the 11th inning, when Dave Winfield doubled down the left-field line, driving in two runs. The Braves again came within one run in the bottom of the 11th, but Jays reliever Mike Timlin fielded Otis Nixon's bunt, throwing to Joe Carter at first base for the final out. The Blue Jays became the first team based outside of the United States to win the World Series. Pat Borders, the Blue Jays' catcher, was the unlikely player who was named MVP after hitting .450 with one home run in the World Series. Morris was acquired in large part for his reputation as a clutch postseason pitcher, but he went 0–3 in the playoffs. Morris, however, pitched well in the regular season, becoming the Blue Jays' first 20-game winner, with a record of 21–6 and an ERA of 4.04.

- Team record 1992: 96 wins–66 losses, W%- 0.593

==== 1993: Back-to-back champs ====
After the 1992 season, the Blue Jays let World Series hero Dave Winfield and longtime closer Tom Henke go but signed two key free agents: designated hitter Paul Molitor from the Milwaukee Brewers and perennial playoff success Dave Stewart from the Oakland Athletics.

In 1993, the Blue Jays had seven All-Stars: outfielders Devon White and Joe Carter, infielders John Olerud and Roberto Alomar, designated hitter Molitor, plus starting pitcher Pat Hentgen, and closer Duane Ward. In August, the Jays acquired former nemesis Rickey Henderson from the Athletics. The Blue Jays cruised to a 95–67 record, one less win than 1992 and seven games ahead of the New York Yankees, winning their third straight division title. The Jays beat the Chicago White Sox 4 games to 2 in the ALCS, and then the Philadelphia Phillies, 4 games to 2, for their second straight World Series victory. The World Series featured several exciting games, including Game 4, played under a slight rain, in which the Blue Jays came back from a 14–9 deficit to win 15–14 and take a 3 games to 1 lead in the series. It remains the highest scoring game in World Series history. Game 6 in Toronto saw the Blue Jays lead 5–1, but give up 5 runs in the 7th inning to trail 6–5. In the bottom of the 9th inning Joe Carter hit a one-out, three-run walk-off home run to clinch the series, off Phillies closer Mitch Williams. This is the only time in the history of Major League Baseball that a team hit a walk-off home run while trailing in the bottom of the 9th inning to win the World Series. The home run is also memorable for late Blue Jays broadcaster Tom Cheek's call:

A swing, and a belt! Left field! Way back! Blue Jays win it! The Blue Jays are World Series champions as Joe Carter hits a three-run home run in the ninth inning and the Blue Jays have repeated as World Series champions! Touch 'em all, Joe, you'll never hit a bigger home run in your life!

— Tom Cheek, late Blue Jays radio play-by-play announcer

In the regular season, three Blue Jays—John Olerud, Paul Molitor and Roberto Alomar—finished 1-2-3 for the AL batting crown.

- Team record 1993: 95 wins – 67 losses, W%- 0.586

=== 1994 season ===
Expectations were high for the Blue Jays for the 1994 season, following back-to-back championships, but they slumped to a 55–60 record and a third-place finish (16 games back of the New York Yankees) when the players' strike began in August (and would cancel the rest of the season, and delay the start of the next one). The team would not qualify for the playoffs for 22 more years, and it was their first losing season since 1982. Joe Carter, Paul Molitor and John Olerud enjoyed good years at the plate, but the pitching fell off. Juan Guzmán slumped considerably from his first three years (40–11, 3.28 ERA), finishing 1994 at 12–11 with a 5.68 ERA. Three young players, Alex Gonzalez, Carlos Delgado and Shawn Green, showed much promise for the future.

- Team record 1994: 55 wins–60 losses, win % – 0.478, 16 games behind division leader

== 1995–2001: The Gord Ash era ==
Before the 1995 season, Pat Gillick, the longtime Blue Jays general manager, resigned and handed the reins of the team to Toronto native Gord Ash, who led the team in its most tumultuous era yet.

In the 1995 season, the Blue Jays proved that they had lost their contending swagger of the past 12 years. Although they had most of the same cast of the World Series teams, the Blue Jays freefell to a dismal 56–88 record, last place in the AL East, 30 games behind the Boston Red Sox. Attendance also tailed off dramatically during the 1995 season, and did not recover for several years. During SkyDome's first four-plus seasons, Blue Jays tickets were among the toughest in all of baseball. While attendance suffered throughout the majors in the years immediately after the strike, the dropoff was especially pronounced for the Canadian teams, the Montreal Expos and Blue Jays.

Labatt Breweries was bought by Belgian-based brewer Interbrew (now InBev) in 1995, making the Blue Jays the second baseball team owned by interests outside of North America. The first was the Blue Jays' expansion cousins, the Mariners, owned by Nintendo.

1996 was another mediocre year for the Blue Jays, despite Pat Hentgen's Cy Young Award (20–10, 3.22 ERA). Ed Sprague had a career year, hitting 36 home runs and driving in 101 runs. However, their 74 wins did put them in 4th place, improving over their last place finish in 1995. They improved their record by 18 victories as they played the full 162 game schedule for the first time since 1993.

The Blue Jays started 1997 with high hopes. Not only did the Jays drastically change their uniforms, they signed former Boston Red Sox ace Roger Clemens to a $24.75 million contract. Clemens had one of the best pitching seasons ever as he won the pitcher's Triple Crown, leading the American League with a record of 21–7, a 2.05 ERA, and 292 strikeouts. This was not enough to lead the Blue Jays to the postseason, however, as they finished in last place for the second time in three years with a record of 76–86. Cito Gaston, the longtime manager who led the team to 3 division titles and 2 World Series crowns, was fired five games before the end of the season.

Before the start of the 1998 season, the Blue Jays acquired closer Randy Myers and slugger Jose Canseco. Gaston was replaced with former Blue Jay Tim Johnson, a relative unknown as a manager. Despite mediocre hitting, strong pitching led by Clemens' second straight pitching Triple Crown (20–6, 2.65 ERA, 271 strikeouts) sparked the Blue Jays to an 88–74 record – their first winning season since 1993. However, this was only good enough to finish a distant third, 26 games behind the New York Yankees, who posted one of the greatest records in all of baseball history at 114–48. They were, however, in contention for the wildcard spot until the final week.

Before the 1999 season, the Blue Jays traded Clemens to the Yankees for starting pitcher David Wells, second baseman Homer Bush and relief pitcher Graeme Lloyd. They also fired manager Tim Johnson during spring training after he lied about several things (including killing people in the Vietnam War) in order to motivate his players. The Blue Jays had initially been willing to stand by Johnson. A blizzard of questions about his credibility during spring training, however, led Ash to fire him less than a month before opening day. Ash said that Johnson had become too much of a distraction, and he had to act immediately to save the 1999 season. Johnson was replaced with Jim Fregosi, who managed the Phillies when they lost to the Blue Jays in the 1993 World Series. The offense picked up somewhat in 1999, but the pitching suffered without Clemens, as the Blue Jays finished at 84–78, in third place. After the 1999 season, the Blue Jays' original mascot for 20 years, BJ Birdy, was replaced by a duo named Ace & Diamond.

On November 8, 1999, Toronto traded star outfielder Shawn Green to the Los Angeles Dodgers for left-handed relief pitcher Pedro Borbón and right-fielder Raúl Mondesí. Green had told the Jays that he would not be re-signing when his contract was up at the end of the year (he wished to play closer to his home in Southern California).

2000 proved to be a similar season, as the Jays had an 83–79 record, which put them out of the wild card race but only 4 1/2 games back of the three-time defending World Series Champion Yankees in the AL East, the first time since 1993 they had contended for the division. That year, Carlos Delgado hit .344 with 41 home runs, 57 doubles, 137 RBI, 123 walks and 115 runs. In addition, six other players hit 20 or more home runs. José Cruz Jr., Raúl Mondesí, Tony Batista, Darrin Fletcher, Shannon Stewart, and Brad Fullmer all contributed to the heart of the lineup.

On September 1, 2000, Rogers Communications Inc. announced that it had purchased 80% of the baseball club for $168 million with Interbrew (now InBev) maintaining 20% interest and the Canadian Imperial Bank of Commerce relinquishing its 10% share. Rogers acquired the remaining 20% owned by Interbrew in January 2004 for $45 million, and currently owns 100% of the team.

Buck Martinez, a former catcher and broadcast announcer for the Blue Jays, took over as manager before the 2001 season. The Blue Jays were back under .500 for 2001, finishing at 80–82, with mediocre pitching and hitting. Delgado led the team again with 39 home runs and 102 RBI. After the 2001 season ended, the Blue Jays fired Gord Ash, ending a seven-year tenure as general manager.

The Blue Jays' struggles were further aggravated by an extremely unfavourable currency exchange rate. In the early 2000s, the Canadian dollar traded for as low as 62 U.S. cents, resulting in massive losses for the Blue Jays who collected most of their revenues in Canadian dollars but paid player salaries in U.S. dollars. When J. P. Ricciardi, then director of player development under Oakland Athletics general manager Billy Beane, was named the Blue Jays' General Manager he was expected to slash the payroll immediately in order to stem the tide of red ink. During the off-season, the team traded or let go several popular players, including Alex Gonzalez, Paul Quantrill, Brad Fullmer and closer Billy Koch to let talented youngsters such as Eric Hinske and Felipe López get a chance to develop into major leaguers.

== 2002–2009: The J. P. Ricciardi era ==
=== 2002 season ===
The Blue Jays started the 2002 season with slow progress in performance. Buck Martinez was fired about a third of the way through the season, with a 20–33 record. He was replaced by third base coach Carlos Tosca, an experienced minor league manager. They went 58–51 under Tosca to finish the season 78–84. Roy Halladay was relied on as the team's ace and rose to the challenge of being the team's top pitcher, finishing the season with a 19–7 record and 2.93 ERA. The hitters were led once again by Carlos Delgado. Promising young players were assigned to key roles; starting third baseman Eric Hinske won the Rookie of the Year Award at the season's conclusion, and 23-year-old centre fielder Vernon Wells had his first 100 RBI season.

- Team record 2002: 78 wins–84 losses, W%- 0.481, 25.5 games behind division leader, third in division

=== 2003 season ===
The 2003 season was a surprise to both team management and baseball analysts. After a poor April, the team had its most successful month ever in May. Carlos Delgado led the majors in RBI, followed closely by Wells. Despite their hitting successes, poor pitching continued to plague the team. Halladay was an exception, winning his first Cy Young Award, going 22–7, with a 3.25 ERA. In July, Shannon Stewart was traded to the Minnesota Twins for Bobby Kielty, another outfielder with a much lower batting average than Stewart's. Although the Jays finished in third place in their division, Delgado was second in the voting for the American League MVP Award. In the off-season, Kielty was traded to the Oakland Athletics for starter Ted Lilly.

- Team record 2003: 86 wins–76 losses, W%- 0.531, 15 games behind division leader, third in division

=== 2004 season ===
The 2004 season was a disappointing year for the Blue Jays right from the beginning. They started the season 0–8 at SkyDome and never started a lengthy winning streak. Much of that was due to injuries to All-Stars Carlos Delgado, Vernon Wells and Roy Halladay among others. Although the additions of starting pitchers Ted Lilly and Miguel Batista and reliever Justin Speier were relatively successful, veteran Pat Hentgen faltered throughout the season and retired on July 24. Rookies and minor league callups David Bush, Jason Frasor, Josh Towers and others filled the void in the rotation and the bullpen; however, inconsistent performances were evident. With the team struggling in last place and mired in a five-game losing streak, manager Carlos Tosca was fired on August 8, 2004, and was replaced by first base coach John Gibbons. Long-time first baseman Carlos Delgado became a free agent in the off-season. Nevertheless, prospects Russ Adams, Gabe Gross, and Alex Ríos provided excitement for the fans. Rookie pitchers David Bush, Gustavo Chacín and Jason Frasor also showed promise for the club's future. The Blue Jays' lone MLB All-Star Game representative was Lilly.

- Team record 2004: 67 wins–94 losses, W%- 0.416, 33.5 games behind division leader, fifth in division

=== 2005 season ===
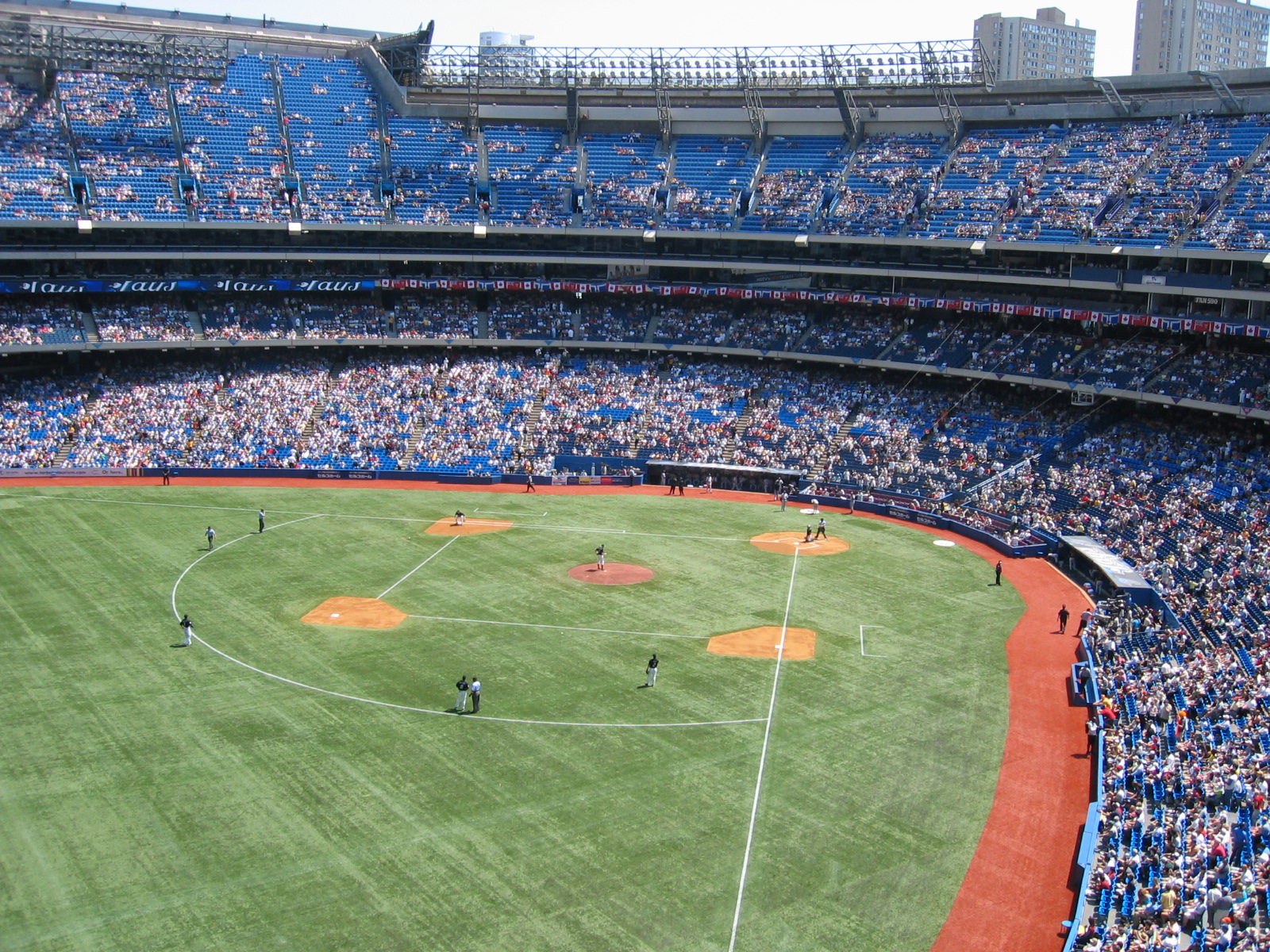
After the 2004 season, FieldTurf replaced AstroTurf as the Rogers Centre's playing surface.

The Blue Jays had a good start to the 2005 season. They led the AL East from early to mid-April and held their record around .500 until late August. The Blue Jays were hit with the injury bug when third baseman Corey Koskie broke his finger, taking him out of the lineup, but the club was pleasantly surprised with the performance of rookie call-up Aaron Hill in his stead. On July 8, just prior to the All-Star break, Blue Jays ace Roy Halladay was struck on the shin by a line drive, resulting in a fractured leg. Though Halladay's injury was hoped to be minor, the recovery process was met with constant delays, and eventually, he was out for the rest of the season. Prior to his injury, the Blue Jays were in serious wild card contention, but soon fell out of the playoff race. The team received glimpses of the future from September call-ups Guillermo Quiróz, John-Ford Griffin, and Shaun Marcum. Marcum made himself noteworthy by posting an ERA of 0.00 over 5 relief appearances and 8 innings in September. Josh Towers also stepped up, showing largely unseen potential by going 7–5 with a 2.91 ERA in the second half of the season.

- Team record 2005: 80 wins–82 losses, W%- 0.494, 15 games behind division leader, third in division

=== 2006 season ===
In 2006, the team experienced its most successful season in years. On July 2, Troy Glaus, Vernon Wells, Roy Halladay, B. J. Ryan, and Alex Ríos were picked to represent the Blue Jays at the All-Star Game. It was the largest number of Blue Jay All-Stars selected for the game since 1993. The team played well in the critical month of September, going 18–10. This, combined with the slumping of the Boston Red Sox, enabled the Blue Jays to take sole possession of second place in the American League East by the end of the season. This marked the first time that the Blue Jays had finished above third place in their division since their World Championship season of 1993, and with the most wins since the 1998 season. On December 18, the Blue Jays announced that they had re-signed centre fielder Wells to a seven-year contract worth $126 million, which came into effect after the 2007 season.

- Team record 2006: 87 wins–75 losses, W%- 0.537, 10 games behind division leader, second in division

=== 2007 season ===
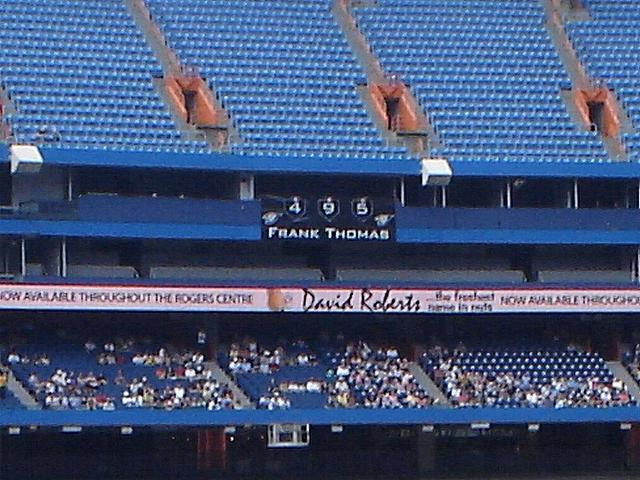
Banner at Rogers Centre, showing Frank Thomas' home run count.

The 2007 season was blighted by persistent injuries, with 12 Blue Jays landing on the disabled list. The most serious injury was that of B. J. Ryan, who was out for the entire season having had Tommy John surgery. Prior to the season, the team signed starting pitchers John Thomson, Tomo Ohka, and Víctor Zambrano; each of them was released before the end of the season. However, young starters Shaun Marcum and Dustin McGowan had breakout years, with 12 wins each. On June 24, McGowan pitched a complete game one-hitter. On June 28, Frank Thomas became the 21st major league player to hit 500 career home runs. Aaron Hill also had a breakout year, setting a team record for second basemen with 47 doubles.

- Team record 2007: 83 wins – 79 losses, W% – 0.512, 13 games behind division leader, third in division

=== 2008 season ===
The Blue Jays' 2008 season featured a strong pitching staff, which led the major leagues with a 3.49 ERA. For much of the season, however, the team struggled to hit home runs and drive in runs. On May 24, starter Jesse Litsch set a team record, with 38 consecutive innings without giving up a walk. On June 20, following a five-game losing streak and with the Blue Jays in last place in the AL East, management fired John Gibbons and several members of his coaching staff, and re-hired Cito Gaston. Meanwhile, Alex Ríos had 32 stolen bases, making him the first Blue Jay with 30 since 2001. On September 5, Roy Halladay earned his 129th career win, moving him into second spot on Toronto's all-time wins list. Halladay also came second in the voting for the Cy Young Award, after posting a 20–11 record and 2.78 ERA. From August 30 to September 9, the team had a 10-game winning streak.

- Team record 2008: 86 wins–76 losses, W%- 0.531, 11 games behind division leader, fourth in division

=== 2009 season ===
The 2009 season saw the addition of two new patches on the Blue Jays' uniforms: on the right arm, a bright red maple leaf (part of the Canadian flag), and on the left arm, a small black band with "TED" written on it, in reference to team owner Ted Rogers, who died in the off-season.

On opening day at the Rogers Centre, the Jays, led by Roy Halladay, beat the Detroit Tigers 12–5. On June 9, with the 20th pick in the MLB draft, the Jays selected RHP Chad Jenkins, a power pitcher that has drawn comparisons to David Wells and Gustavo Chacín (passing over Mike Trout who was picked 25th by the Angels). Aaron Hill and Roy Halladay both had excellent years and represented the Blue Jays at the 2009 All-Star Game in St. Louis. In mid-August, J. P. Ricciardi allowed the Chicago White Sox to claim Alex Ríos off waivers. Despite a hot start, the Jays quickly fell, including a 9-game losing streak, after starting with a 27–14 record. With two games remaining in what was a disappointing season, Ricciardi was fired on October 3. He was replaced by assistant general manager Alex Anthopoulos.

Despite a 75-win season, the Jays saw the strong return of Aaron Hill, who won the American League Comeback Player of the Year Award and the Silver Slugger for second base. Adam Lind, who also had a strong season, earned the Silver Slugger for designated hitter. Shortstop Marco Scutaro also broke out for career highs in batting average (.282), slugging percentage (.379), at bats (574), and total bases (235). Toronto was one of 7 teams to not make the playoffs in the 2000s decade, joining the Baltimore Orioles, Cincinnati Reds, Pittsburgh Pirates, Kansas City Royals, Washington Nationals (who relocated in 2004 from Montreal), and Texas Rangers.

- Team record 2009: 75 wins–87 losses, W%- 0.463, 28 games behind division leader, fourth in division

== 2010–2015: The Alex Anthopoulos era ==
=== 2010 season ===
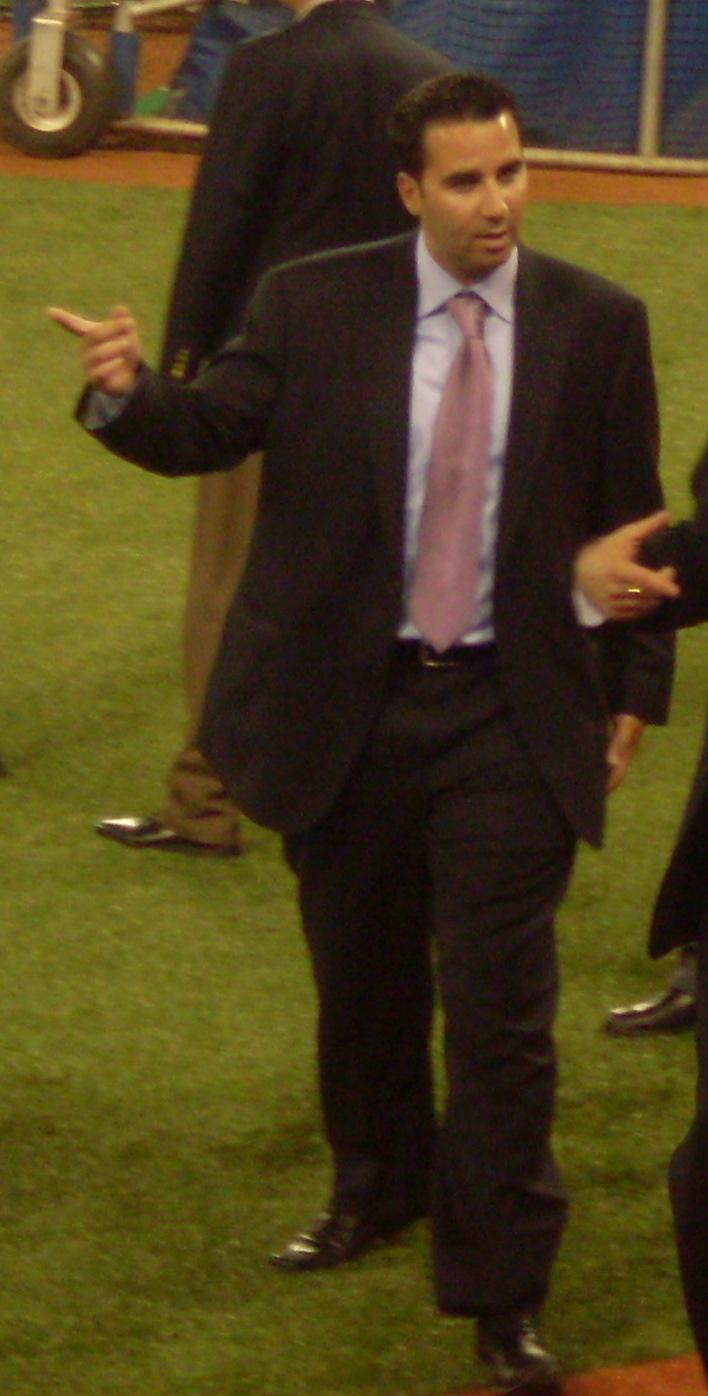
2010 was Alex Anthopoulos' first full season as General Manager of the Jays.

In the off-season, the Blue Jays' ace Roy Halladay was traded to the Philadelphia Phillies for Kyle Drabek, Travis d'Arnaud, and Michael Taylor; Taylor was immediately traded to the Oakland Athletics for Brett Wallace. The team's significant free agent signings were that of catcher John Buck and shortstop Álex González.

The 2010 season was a 10-win improvement over the previous season. It was a career year for José Bautista, who hit 54 home runs, breaking George Bell's franchise record. In doing so, he became the 26th player to reach 50 home runs and the first since Alex Rodriguez and Prince Fielder achieved the feat in 2007. The Blue Jays also set a franchise record for the most home runs in a single season as they hit 257, 13 more than their previous record of 244 set by the 2000 Blue Jays. The Blue Jays tied the 1996 Baltimore Orioles for the third most home runs by a team in a single season. Seven players (José Bautista, Vernon Wells, Aaron Hill, Adam Lind, Lyle Overbay, John Buck, and Edwin Encarnación) hit 20 home runs or more throughout the season, tying an MLB record previously set by four teams, including the 2000 Blue Jays.

On August 7, catching prospect J. P. Arencibia made his major league debut. He went 4-for-5 with 2 home runs, including a home run hit on the first pitch he saw. The next day, starting pitcher Brandon Morrow came within one out of a no-hitter, finishing with 17 strikeouts in a complete game one-hitter.

- Team record 2010: 85 wins – 77 losses, W%- 0.525, 11 games behind division leader, fourth in division

=== 2011 season ===
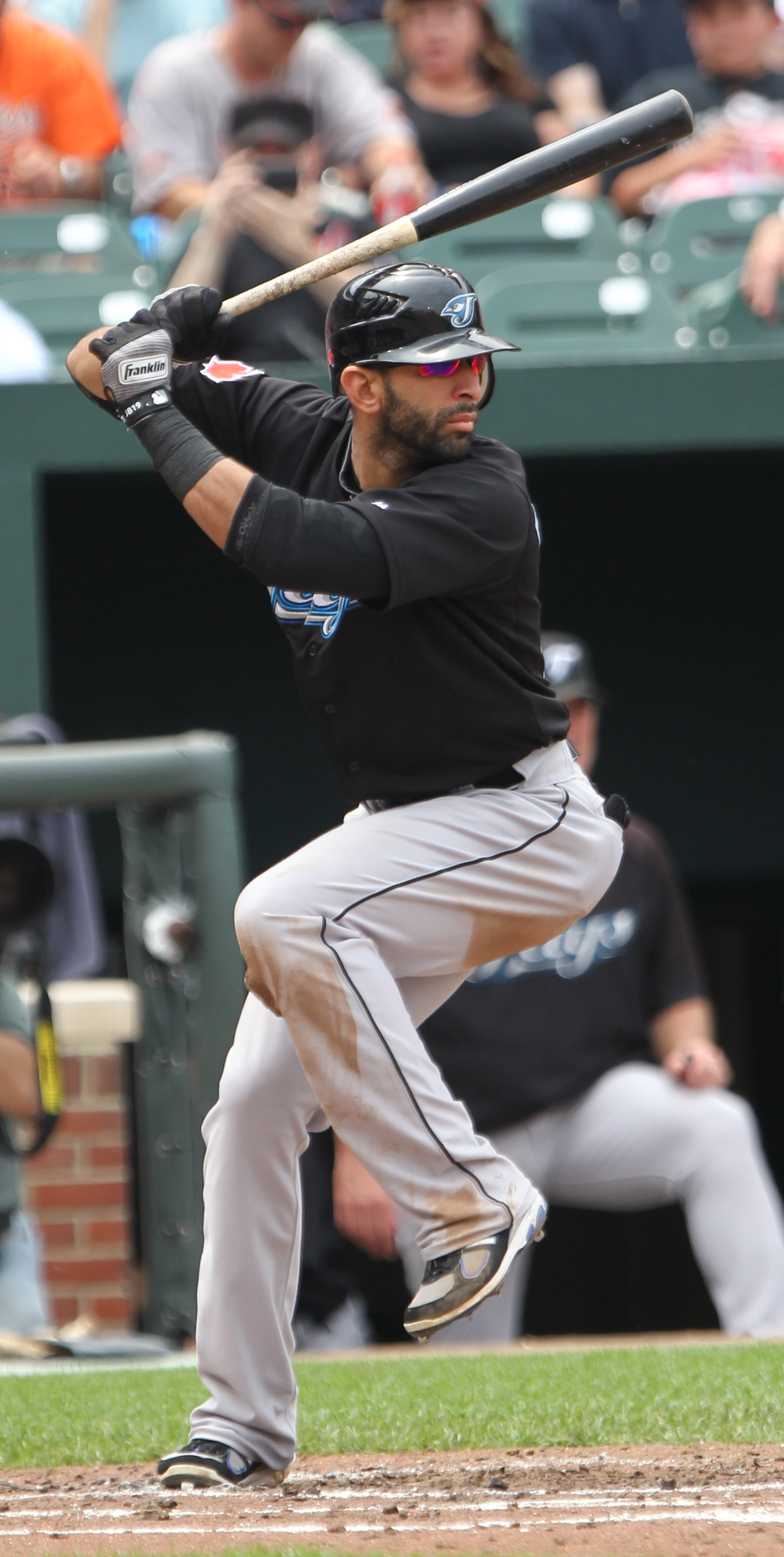
Jays right fielder José Bautista in 2011

Led by new manager John Farrell, the Blue Jays' 2011 season was up-and-down for the most part, as the team finished with a .500 record. After signing a five-year $64 million contract extension, José Bautista followed up his record-setting 2010 season with a Major League-leading 43 home runs, along with 103 RBI, 132 walks, and a .302 average. Rookie J. P. Arencibia set a Blue Jays' single-season record with 23 home runs by a catcher. In August, third base prospect Brett Lawrie made his Major League debut and hit .293 with 9 home runs, 4 triples, and 25 RBI, in 43 games.

Starting pitcher and ace Ricky Romero led the team with 15 wins and a 2.92 ERA. He also became an All-Star for the first time in his career. The other starting pitchers were inconsistent throughout the season. Jon Rauch and Frank Francisco, both acquired in the off-season, shared the closer role. They both struggled through the first half of the season, though Francisco improved in the last two months of the season, and had six saves in September.

On July 31, the Blue Jays retired their first number, Roberto Alomar's #12.

- Team record 2011: 81 wins – 81 losses, W%- 0.500, 16 games behind division leader, fourth in division

=== 2012 season ===
The 2012 season was an injury-plagued year for the Blue Jays, having used 31 total pitchers, which set a franchise record. In June, three starting pitchers (Brandon Morrow, Kyle Drabek, and Drew Hutchison) were lost to injury in a span of four days, two of whom required Tommy John surgery. In the second half of the season, some key players in Toronto's lineup, including All-Star José Bautista, missed a significant amount of playing time due to injury, sending the team into a freefall and culminating in a 73–89 record. Despite the underachievements of Ricky Romero and Adam Lind, Casey Janssen established himself as a reliable closer (22 SV, 2.52 ERA) and Edwin Encarnación developed into one of the league's best power hitters (.280 AVG, 42 HR, 110 RBI).

The team opened on the road in Cleveland, where they beat the Indians, 7–4, in 16 full innings, setting a new record for the longest opening-day game in major league history. The previous record of 15 innings had been set by the Washington Senators and Philadelphia Athletics on April 13, 1926, and was tied by the Detroit Tigers and the Indians on April 19, 1960.

On April 20, the Jays turned a triple play against the Kansas City Royals in a 4–3 win. It was the first triple play they turned since September 21, 1979.

- Team record 2012: 73 wins – 89 losses, W%- 0.451, 22 games behind division leader, fourth in division

=== 2013 season ===
During the off-season the Blue Jays announced multiple trades and free agent signings. One such trade acquired Mark Buehrle, José Reyes and Josh Johnson among others from the Miami Marlins and another was with the Mets for R. A. Dickey. Melky Cabrera was signed as a free agent around the same time.

Despite fans and analysts high expectations, the 2013 team did not live up to the preseason predictions. Most of the regulars battled injury (Reyes broke his ankle during a steal attempt 10 games into the season and a benign tumor was removed from Cabrera's spine after the season ended) and generally underperformed. One of the few bright spots was the promotion of fan favorite Munenori Kawasaki to replace Reyes. The Blue Jays also tied a franchise record with an 11-game winning streak from June 11–23. Edwin Encarnación finished the season on the DL with a wrist injury but had great numbers (.272 AVG, 36 HR and 104 RBI) to follow up his break-out 2012 season.

- Team record 2013: 74 wins – 88 losses, win % – 0.457, 23 games behind division leader, last in division

=== 2014 season ===
Pitcher Roy Halladay signed a one-day contract with the Blue Jays before retiring from baseball, citing injuries. The Jays had a nine-game win streak from May 20 to 28, as well as wins in 18 of 21 between May 15 and June 6. On August 10, the Blue Jays played the longest game in franchise history by both time and innings, winning 6–5 in 19 innings and playing 6 hours, 37 minutes against the visiting Detroit Tigers.

- Team record 2014: 83 wins–79 losses, W%- .512, 13 games behind division leader, third in division, 5 games behind AL wild card cutoff, sixth in AL wild card

=== 2015: Return to the playoffs, AL East champions ===
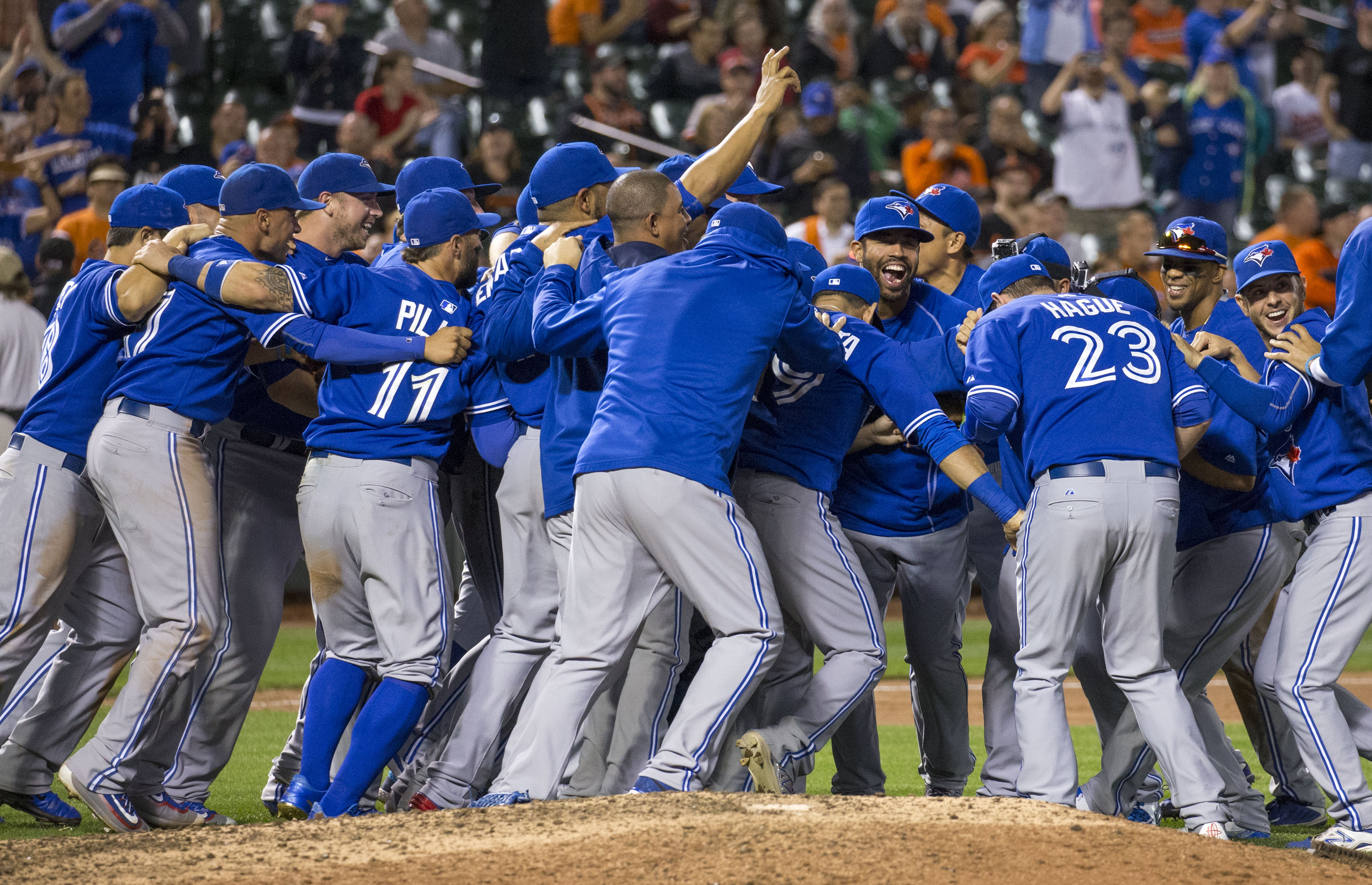
The Blue Jays celebrate after clinching the American League East in 2015; they went as far as the ALCS, only to lose against the eventual World Series-winning Kansas City Royals.

During the off-season, the Jays signed Toronto-born catcher Russell Martin through free agency. The Jays acquired Marco Estrada, Devon Travis, All-Star third baseman Josh Donaldson, and Michael Saunders in trades. The Jays claimed Justin Smoak, Andy Dirks, and Chris Colabello off waivers. However, Dirks, along with John Mayberry Jr., were eventually non–tendered; the Jays later signed Dirks to a minor league contract. Melky Cabrera and Brandon Morrow left through free agency and Juan Francisco was claimed off waivers by the Boston Red Sox.

The Jays later traded José Reyes and pitching prospects Miguel Castro, Jeff Hoffman, and Jesus Tinoco to the Colorado Rockies for All-Star shortstop Troy Tulowitzki and reliever LaTroy Hawkins. Two days later, they acquired All-Star pitcher David Price from the Detroit Tigers in exchange for pitching prospects Daniel Norris, Matt Boyd, and Jairo Labourt.

The Jays had two 11-game winning streaks during this season. On September 25, the Blue Jays clinched a playoff berth, ending the longest active playoff drought in North American professional sports (see List of Major League Baseball franchise postseason droughts). They subsequently claimed the AL East division title on September 30, after defeating the Baltimore Orioles 15–2 in the first game of a doubleheader.

The Blue Jays faced the Texas Rangers in the ALDS. After losing back-to-back home games, they won the next three games in a row to take the five-game series, advancing to the ALCS; a three-game comeback series victory had not been accomplished since 2012 by the San Francisco Giants. During game five of the series in Toronto, Blue Jays' right fielder José Bautista executed what Andrew Keh of The New York Times described as possibly "the most ostentatious bat flip in MLB history" after hitting a go-ahead, three-run home run off Rangers relief pitcher Sam Dyson capping off a controversy-laden seventh inning that lasted almost an hour. Bautista wrote an article about the bat flip published in November 2015 in The Players' Tribune.

The Blue Jays then faced the Kansas City Royals in the ALCS, losing the series 4–2 in Kansas City; the Royals would eventually win the World Series.

After the playoffs, Donaldson was named AL MVP, becoming the first Blue Jay to win the award since George Bell in 1987.

- Team record 2015: 93 wins–69 losses, W%- .574

== 2016–present: The Mark Shapiro and Ross Atkins era ==
=== 2016 season: Wild Card winners ===
Upon the expiration of Paul Beeston's contract, Mark Shapiro replaced him as president of the Blue Jays. Alex Anthopoulos resigned two months after the hiring of Shapiro. Ross Atkins subsequently took his place.

During the off-season, David Price left the Blue Jays through free agency, signing with the Boston Red Sox, while the Blue Jays signed J. A. Happ. On March 4, 2016, infielder Maicer Izturis announced his retirement from baseball. A few weeks later, Brad Penny and Rafael Soriano, both veterans under minor league contract with the Blue Jays, retired from baseball as well.

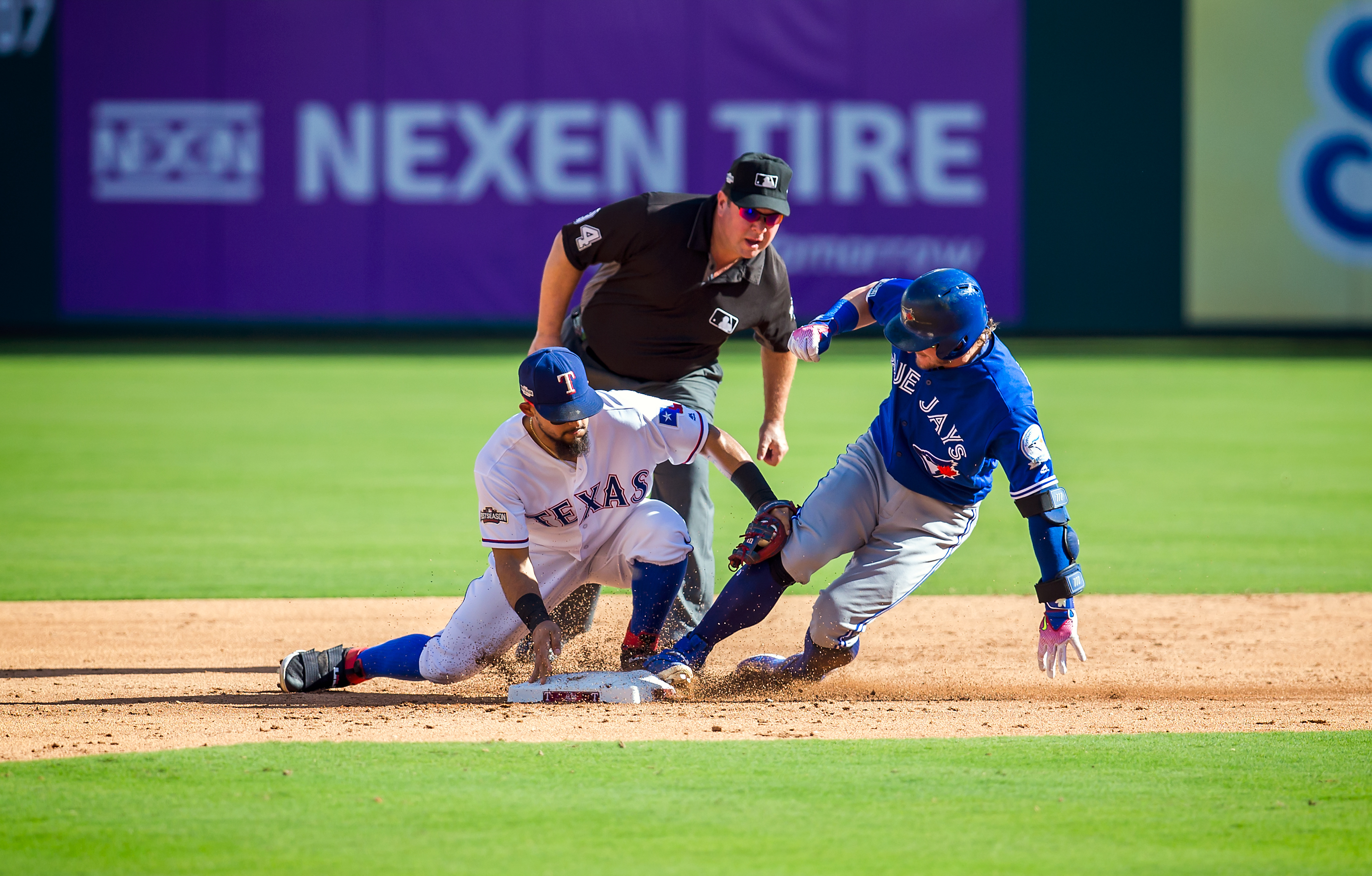
Josh Donaldson slides into second base during the first game of the 2016 ALDS.

On May 15, 2016, the Blue Jays and the Texas Rangers brawled against each other in Arlington, Texas. The brawl happened when Matt Bush threw a pitch at Jose Bautista, then Bautista made an illegal slide, and Rougned Odor punched Bautista. Bautista was later suspended for one game.

On May 31, 2016, the Blue Jays traded for Jason Grilli from the Atlanta Braves. Before the non-waiver trade deadline at 4 pm EDT on August 1, 2016, the Blue Jays traded for Joaquín Benoit, Melvin Upton Jr., Scott Feldman, and Francisco Liriano. On August 25, 2016, the Blue Jays re-acquired popular backup catcher Dioner Navarro in a trade with the Chicago White Sox. This was done before the August 31 trade deadline making Navarro eligible to be on the postseason roster.

On October 2, 2016, the Blue Jays clinched their first Wild Card berth with a Detroit Tigers loss to the Atlanta Braves. On October 4, 2016, the Blue Jays defeated the Baltimore Orioles in the American League Wild Card Game in extra innings, via a walk-off three-run home run by Edwin Encarnación in the bottom of the 11th inning. On October 9, 2016, the Blue Jays completed a sweep of the Texas Rangers in the American League Division Series to advance to the American League Championship Series for the second consecutive year. On October 19, 2016, the Blue Jays were eliminated from World Series contention with a 3–0 loss to the Cleveland Indians in Game 5 of the American League Championship Series.

- Team record 2016: 89 wins–73 losses, W%- .549

=== 2017 season ===
On November 11, 2016, it was announced that Toronto had signed designated hitter Kendrys Morales to a three-year, $33 million deal. The contract became official on November 18.

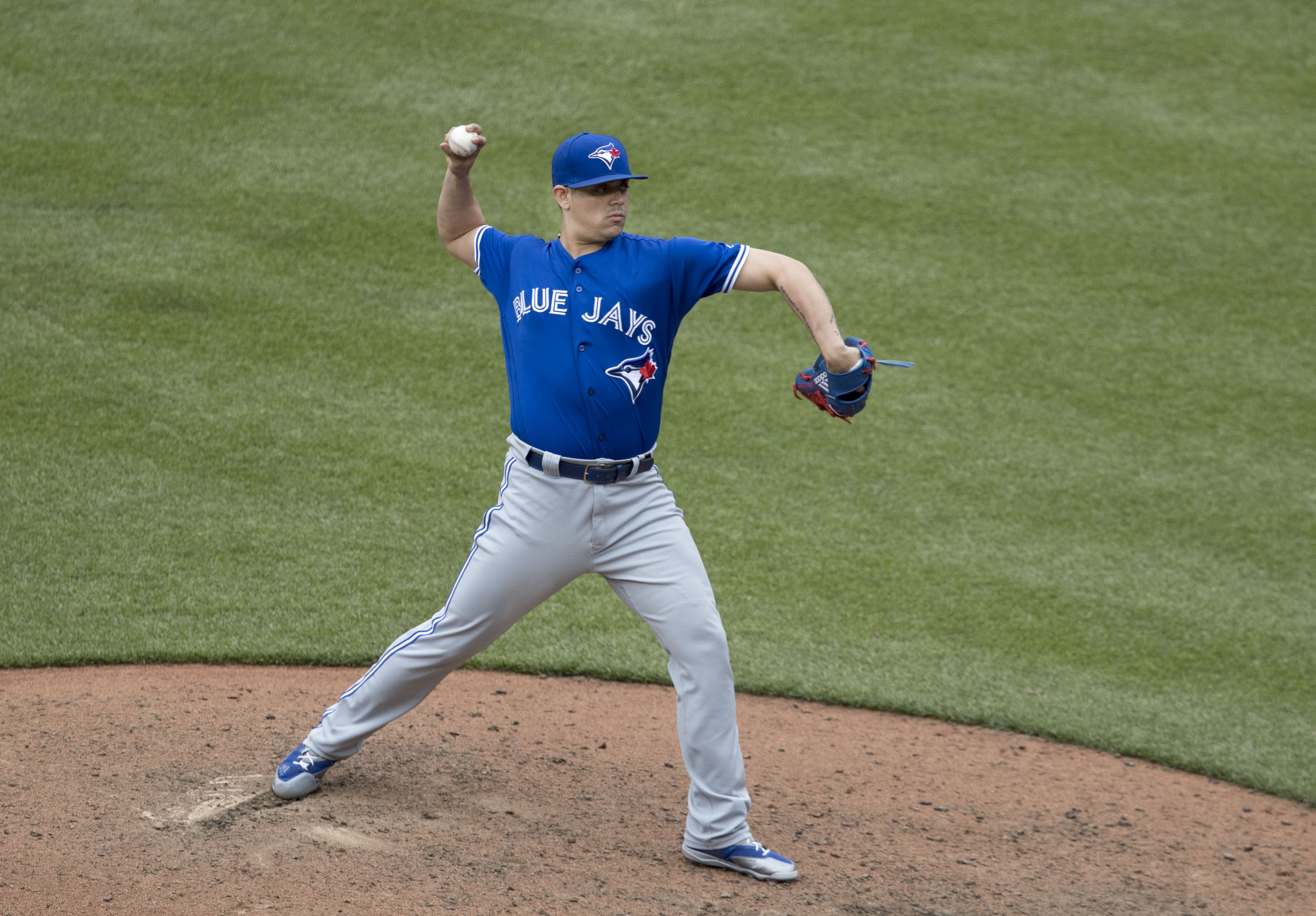
Roberto Osuna during the 2017 season

On December 5, 2016, Steve Pearce signed a two-year, $12.5 million contract with Toronto. On January 5, 2017, Edwin Encarnación signed a three-year, $60 million contract with the Cleveland Indians. On January 18, 2017, Bautista signed a one-year, $18 million contract with the Blue Jays. The contract includes a $17 million mutual option for the 2018 season, as well as a $20 million vesting option for 2019. The following day, Michael Saunders signed with the Philadelphia Phillies. However, in late June, the Phillies released Saunders and the Jays signed him to a minor league contract.

On April 2, one day before the start of the regular season, Melvin Upton Jr. was released. By the end of April, the Jays had the worst record in all of MLB.

On July 2, the Jays traded Grilli to the Texas Rangers for Eduard Pinto. Pearce hit two walk-off grand slams in a span of three days: one against the Oakland Athletics on July 27 and another against the Los Angeles Angels on July 30, the latter of which is an ultimate grand slam.

The Blue Jays wore special red-and-white uniforms at select games during the 2017 season to celebrate the 150th anniversary of Canada.

- Team record 2017: 76 wins–86 losses, W%- .469, 17 games behind division leader, fourth in division, 9 games behind AL wild card cutoff, eighth in AL wild card

=== 2018 season ===
The Blue Jays declined their mutual option on José Bautista, allowing him to enter free agency. He then signed with the Atlanta Braves, later the New York Mets, and eventually with the Philadelphia Phillies.

The Blue Jays traded two prospects to the San Diego Padres for Yangervis Solarte. The Blue Jays also acquired Curtis Granderson and Seung-hwan Oh as free agents.

On June 22, Roberto Osuna was suspended for 75 games after being accused of sexual assault on May 8 and applied retroactively from the date of the incident.

In July, the Blue Jays traded Pearce to the Boston Red Sox for a prospect, Santiago Espinal. They also dealt three pitchers: J. A. Happ to the New York Yankees, Seung-hwan Oh to the Colorado Rockies, and Roberto Osuna to the Houston Astros.

In August, the Blue Jays traded Josh Donaldson to the Cleveland Indians for a player to be named later, later revealed to be a pitching prospect, Julian Merryweather. The Blue Jays also traded Curtis Granderson to the Milwaukee Brewers for a prospect.

On September 26, it was confirmed by the Blue Jays that manager John Gibbons would not return for the 2019 season.

- Team record 2018: 73 wins–89 losses, W%- .451, 35 games behind division leader, fourth in division, 24 games behind AL wild card cutoff, seventh in AL wild card

=== 2019 season ===
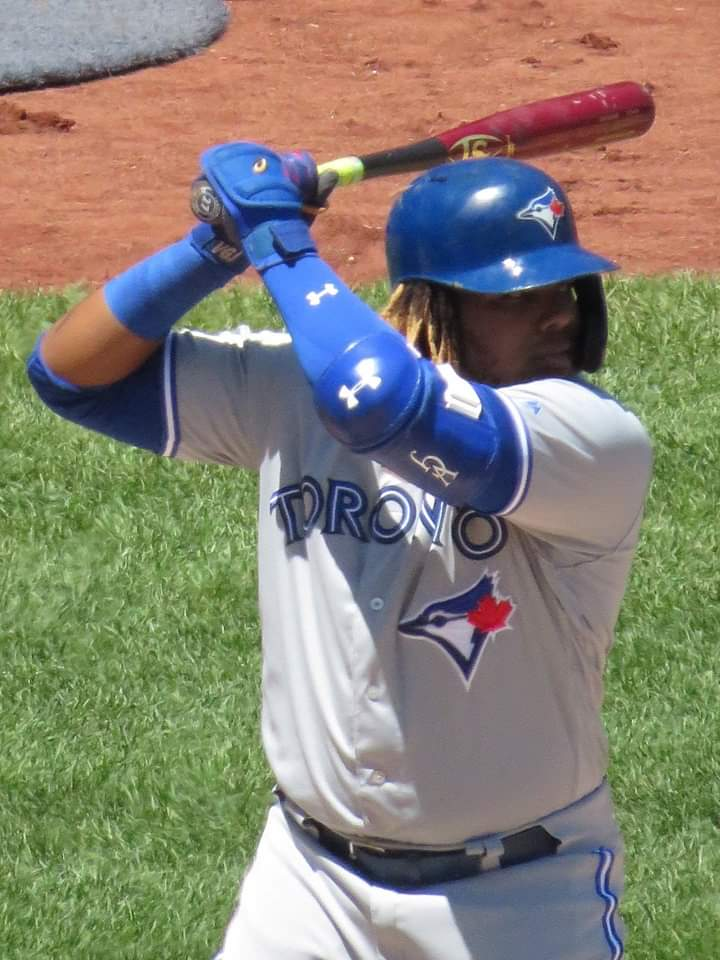
Vladimir Guerrero Jr. during the 2019 season

On October 25, 2018, the Blue Jays announced that Charlie Montoyo had been hired as their new manager.

Early in the season, the Blue Jays traded Kendrys Morales to the Oakland Athletics and Kevin Pillar to the San Francisco Giants.

During the season, the Blue Jays called up Vladimir Guerrero Jr., Cavan Biggio, and Bo Bichette for the first time. The three are second-generation Major League Baseball players with the first two also being sons of Hall of Famers Vladimir Guerrero Sr. and Craig Biggio, respectively; Bo Bichette is the son of Dante Bichette.

Nearing the trade deadline, the Blue Jays traded Marcus Stroman to the New York Mets and Aaron Sanchez to the Houston Astros.

- Team record 2019: 67 wins–95 losses, W%- .414, 36 games behind division leader, fourth in division, 29 games behind AL wild card cutoff, ninth in AL wild card

=== 2020 season: Temporarily in Buffalo ===
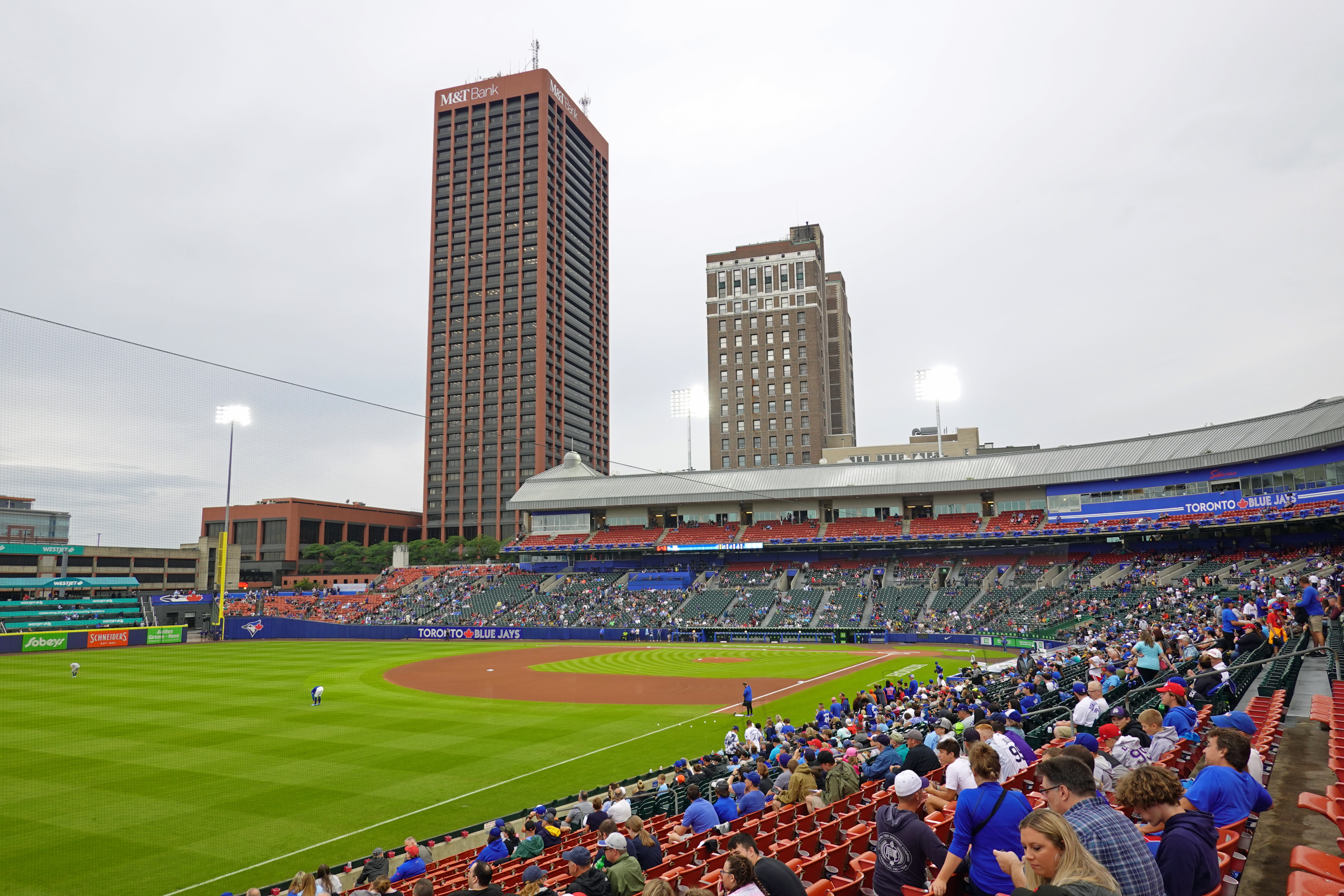
A Blue Jays home game at Sahlen Field in Buffalo, New York in July 2021

Over the 2019–20 off-season, the Blue Jays signed free agents Tanner Roark and Hyun-jin Ryu. The Blue Jays also signed Shun Yamaguchi from the Yomiuri Giants, the first player the Blue Jays successfully signed via the posting system. On January 18, 2020, the Toronto Blue Jays unveiled a new blue alternate uniform.

On July 24, 2020, it was announced that the Toronto Blue Jays would play a majority of their home games in Buffalo, New York, at their Triple-A affiliate Buffalo Bisons ballpark, Sahlen Field, as the Canadian government disallowed the Blue Jays and their opponents from playing in Canada during the COVID-19 pandemic.

The Blue Jays reached the Wild Card series of the postseason, only to be swept by the Tampa Bay Rays in two games. The Blue Jays scored only three runs total in the two games.

- Team record 2020: 32 wins–28 losses, W%- .533

=== 2021 season: Temporarily in Dunedin and Buffalo ===
On successive days in January 2021, the Blue Jays signed relief pitchers Kirby Yates and Tyler Chatwood, and outfielder George Springer. The Blue Jays also signed infielder Marcus Semien. However, Yates was out for the entire season to recover from Tommy John surgery.

The Toronto Blue Jays played their home games in TD Ballpark in Dunedin, Florida until June 1 when they moved back to Sahlen Field in Buffalo. On July 16, the Blue Jays announced that they would finally return to Rogers Centre in Toronto on July 30 after the Canadian government allowed the Blue Jays and their opponents to play in Canada.

2019 first-round draft pick and pitcher Alek Manoah was called up to the majors for the first time this season.

Despite having 91 wins in 2021, the Toronto Blue Jays were fourth in the American League East and one game back of the Wild Card cutoff, preventing them from reaching the postseason.

- Team record 2021: 91 wins–71 losses, W%- .562, 9 games behind division leader, fourth in division, 1 game behind AL wild card cutoff, third in AL wild card.

=== 2022 season: Full return to Toronto since the beginning of the COVID-19 pandemic ===
During the off-season, the Blue Jays signed Kevin Gausman, Yimi García, and Yusei Kikuchi as Robbie Ray, Marcus Semien, and Kirby Yates left for free agency. The off-season is mainly affected by a lockout that lasted from December 2021 to March 2022. After the lockout, the Blue Jays traded for infielder Matt Chapman from the Oakland Athletics, as well as traded Randal Grichuk for Raimel Tapia. On July 13, the team released Charlie Montoyo as the manager for the team. With his four seasons with Toronto (2019–2022), he had a win-loss record of 236–235 (.501), and made it to the playoffs once (2020 ALWC). The new interim manager is bench coach John Schneider. At the trade deadline, the Blue Jays traded for utility player Whit Merrifield from the Kansas City Royals. After the trade deadline, the Blue Jays claimed outfielder Jackie Bradley Jr. from waivers.

The Blue Jays clinched home advantage for the American League Wild Card Series and hosted the Seattle Mariners. However, the Mariners swept the Blue Jays in two games, overcoming an 8–1 deficit in game 2.

- Team record 2022: 92 wins–70 losses, W%- .568

=== 2023 season: Continued playoff failure ===
During the off-season, the Blue Jays traded outfielder Teoscar Hernández to the Seattle Mariners for relief pitcher Erik Swanson and pitching prospect Adam Macko. The Blue Jays hired Don Mattingly as the new bench coach. The Blue Jays later signed starting pitcher Chris Bassitt and outfielder Kevin Kiermaier and traded catcher Gabriel Moreno and outfielder Lourdes Gurriel Jr. to the Arizona Diamondbacks for outfielder and catcher Daulton Varsho.

The Blue Jays qualified for American League Wild Card Series and played against the Minnesota Twins in Target Field. The Twins swept the Blue Jays in two games. This marked the third time in four seasons that the Blue Jays qualified for postseason wildcard series and swept by their opponents each time.

- Team record 2023: 89 wins–73 losses, W%- .549

=== 2024 season ===
During the off-season, the Blue Jays re-signed Kiermaier and signed utility player Isiah Kiner-Falefa, designated hitter Justin Turner, and pitcher Yariel Rodríguez. The Blue Jays also traded Santiago Espinal for a pitching prospect.

=== 2025 season ===
After a lot of speculation, the team signed Vladimir Guerrero Jr to a 14-year contract. The Blue Jays had a resurgent season, qualifying for the American League Playoffs on September 21. They subsequently won the American League East division on September 28, clinching the first seed in the AL Playoffs and bypassing the Wild Card round. They finished with a record of 94–68.

The Toronto Blue Jays won against the fourth seeded New York Yankees 3–1, in the American League division series. They advanced to face the Seattle Mariners in the American League Championship Series. Despite trailing 3–2 in the series, the Blue Jays defeated the Mariners at home in seven games in the 2025 ALCS to advance to the 2025 World Series, their first appearance since 1993, with George Springer hitting a home run in the seventh inning in Game 7, the first go-ahead home run with his team trailing by multiple runs in the seventh inning or later in a Game 7 in MLB history.

In the World Series, the Blue Jays faced the Los Angeles Dodgers, who entered the series as the defending champions. In Game 1, Addison Barger hit a grand slam to give the Blue Jays an 11–4 win. The Blue Jays lost game 3 in the first 18-inning World Series game since 2018, but managed to take a 3–2 series lead, putting them a win away from their third franchise title. However, the Blue Jays lost both of their last two games at home, including a decisive game 7 where they lost a 4–2 lead in extra innings. The Dodgers won back-to-back World Series titles and handed the Blue Jays their first World Series loss ever.
