= Bijay =

Bijay is a given name. Notable people with this name include:

- Bijay Biswaal (born 1964), Indian painter
- Bijay Chand Mahtab (1881–1941), Maharaja of Bardhaman
- Bijay Chhetri (born 2001), Indian footballer
- Bijay Kumar Gachhadar (born 1954), Nepali politician
- Bijay Mishra (1936–2020), Indian playwright
- Bijay Mohanty (1950–2020), Indian actor
- Bijay Kumar Nayak, Indian Protestant bishop
- Bijay Singh, Indian politician
- Bijay Subba (born 1994), Indian cricketer
- Bijay Subba (politician) (born 1957), Nepali politician
- Bijay Subedi, Nepali politician

== See also ==
- Vijay (disambiguation)
- B. J. (given name)
