= BJ's =

BJ's may refer to:

- BJ's Restaurants
- BJ's Wholesale Club

== See also ==
- BJ (disambiguation)
