= B. J. =

The initials B. J. as a given name or nickname may refer to:

== In arts and entertainment ==
=== Film, television, and theatre ===
- B. J. Averell (born 1979), an American online tutor and reality television contestant
- B. J. Novak (born 1979), an American comedian and writer
- B. J. Porter (born 1971), an American actor
- B. J. Ward (actress) (born 1944), an American actress
- B. J. Whitmer (born 1978), an American professional wrestler
- B. J. Annis (born 1947), an American professional wrestler

=== Literature ===
- B. J. Daniels (writer), an American author of contemporary romance novels
- BJ Gallagher, a speaker and author
- B. J. Oliphant (1929-2016), pseudonym for Sheri Stewart Tepper, an American author
- BJ Ward (poet) (born 1967), an American poet

=== Music ===
- Billie Joe Armstrong (born 1972), lead singer of the band Green Day
- BJ the Chicago Kid, an American singer-songwriter
- B. J. Cole (born 1946), an English pedal steel guitarist famous for playing in the band Cochise
- B. J. Leiderman (born 1956), an American composer and songwriter
- B. J. Nilsen (born 1975), a Swedish sound artist
- B. J. Thomas (1942–2021), an American singer
- B.J. Wilson (1947–1990), an English drummer for the band Procol Harum

== In government and politics ==
- B. J. Cruz (born 1951), an American judge and politician from Guam
- B. J. Habibie (1936–2019), the third President of Indonesia, holding office from 1998 to 1999
- B. J. Panda, an Indian politician
- B. J. Vorster (1915–1983), Prime Minister and President of South Africa

== In sport ==
=== American and Canadian football (gridiron football) ===
- B. J. Askew (born 1980), an American football fullback for the Tampa Bay Buccaneers of the NFL
- B. J. Bello (born 1994), an American football player
- B. J. Baylor (born 1997), American football player
- B. J. Cohen (born 1975), an American football offensive lineman/defensive lineman
- B. J. Daniels (American football), American football quarterback
- B. J. Gallis (born 1975), a former football linebacker in the Canadian Football League
- B. J. Green (born 2003), American football player
- B. J. Raji (born 1986), an American football player
- B. J. Sams (American football) (born 1980), an American football player
- B. J. Sander (born 1980), an American football player
- B. J. Symons (born 1980), an American football player
- B. J. Thompson (American football) (born 1999), American football player
- B. J. Tucker (born 1980), an American football player
- B. J. Ward (American football) (born 1981), an American football player

=== Baseball ===
- B. J. LaMura (born 1981), an American baseball player
- B. J. Ryan (born 1975), an American baseball player
- B. J. Surhoff (born 1964), an American baseball player
- B. J. Upton, now known as Melvin Upton, Jr. (born 1984), an American baseball player

=== Basketball ===
- B. J. Armstrong (born 1967), a retired American professional basketball player
- BJ McKie (born 1977), an American basketball player
- B. J. Tyler (born 1971), an American former professional basketball player

=== Ice hockey ===
- B.J. Crombeen (born 1985), a Canadian professional ice hockey player
- B. J. Young (ice hockey) (1977–2005), a professional ice hockey right player

=== Other sports ===
- BJ Botha (born 1980), South African rugby union player
- B. J. Flores (born 1979), Mexican American professional boxer
- B. J. Johnson (swimmer) (born 1987), American swimmer
- B. J. Penn (born 1978), American mixed martial arts fighter

== In other fields ==
- B. J. Fogg, American behavioral psychologist
- B. J. Kennedy (1921–2003), American physician
- B. J. Palmer (1881–1961), pioneer of Chiropractic
- B. J. Sams (television) (born 1935), American news anchor on Today's THV This Morning

== Fictional characters ==
- B.J. (dinosaur) a character from the children's television program Barney & Friends
- BJ Birdie, former mascot for the Toronto Blue Jays baseball team
- B. J. Hunnicutt, a fictional doctor on the TV show M*A*S*H
- B. J. Jones, a character on the ABC soap opera General Hospital
- BJ Smith, a character in the video game Grand Theft Auto: Vice City
- B.J. Walker, a character on the American soap opera Santa Barbara
- William "B.J." Blazkowicz, the protagonist of the video game series Wolfenstein
- Billy Joe "B. J." McKay, the protagonist of the TV show B. J. and the Bear

== See also ==
- BJ (disambiguation)
