= Hateley =

Hateley is a surname. Notable people with the surname include:

- Barbara "BJ" Gallagher Hateley (born 1949), inspirational author and speaker who lives in Los Angeles, California
- Linzi Hateley (born 1970), English stage actress
- Mark Hateley (born 1961), retired English football player
- Tom Hateley (born 1989), English professional footballer
- Tony Hateley (1941–2014), former footballer who played for numerous English clubs as a striker

== See also ==
- Hateley Heath, residential area of West Bromwich in the West Midlands of England
