= Cathy Conheim =

American writer

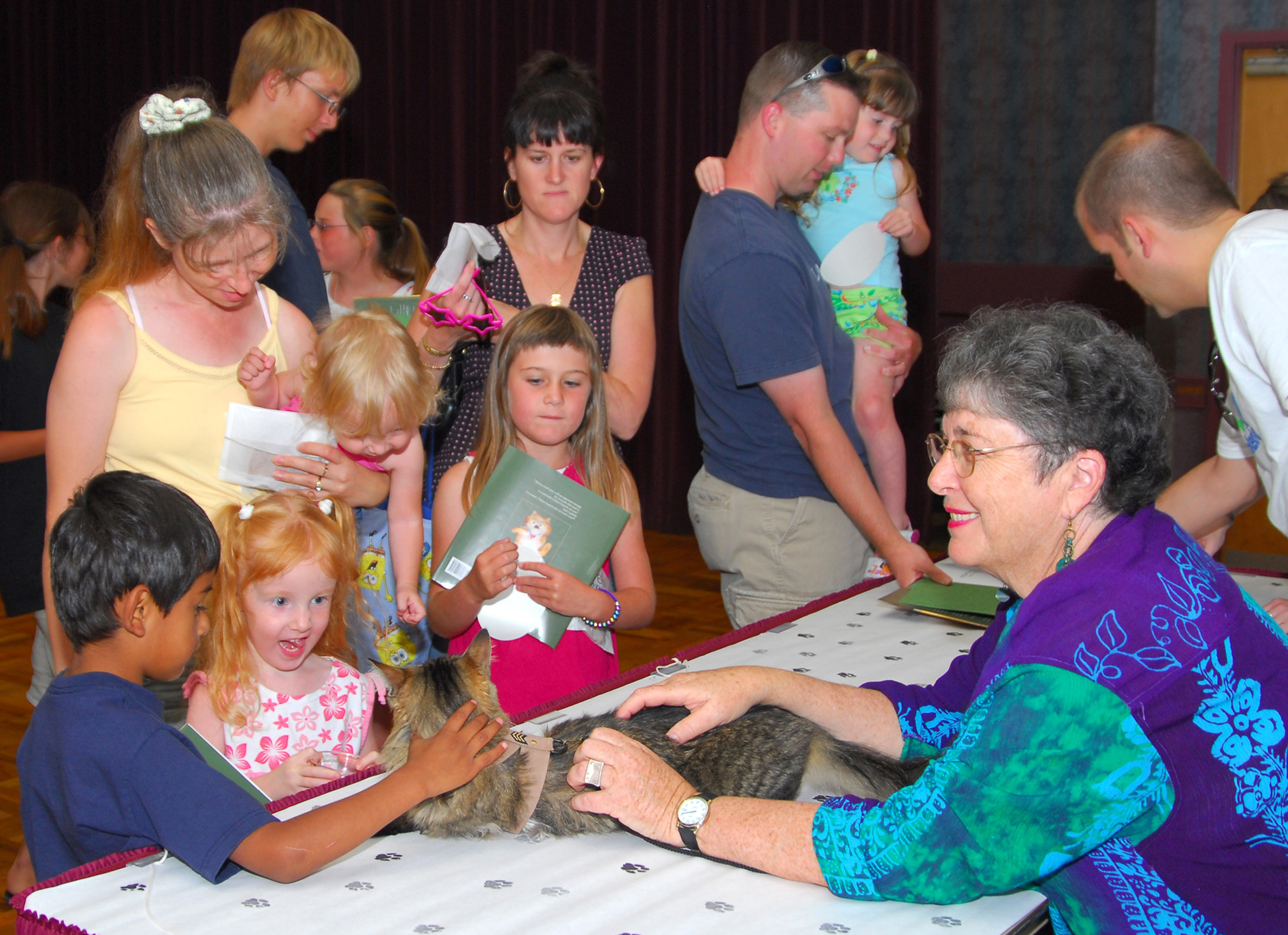
Cathy and Henry the Cat make an appearance at the Scottish Rite Center in San Diego.

Cathy Conheim LCSW is a psychotherapist and the author of several children's books.

== Works ==
- Conheim, Cathy; Gallagher, BJ (2006), What's the Matter with Henry? The True Tale of a Three-legged Cat, BreakThrough Press, ISBN 0-9679576-2-1
- Conheim, Cathy (2005), Henry's World, BreakThrough Press, ISBN 0-9679576-1-3
- Conheim, Cathy; Philips, Jan; Forester, Christine; A Circle of Women (2000), A Waist Is a Terrible Thing to Mind: A Wake Up Call, BreakThrough Press, ISBN 978-0-9679576-0-9
