= BJ =

BJ or B. J. may refer to:

== Businesses and organizations ==
- BJ Services Company, an oil and gas equipment and services company that is now a subsidiary of Baker Hughes
- BJ's Restaurant & Brewery, an American restaurant chain
- BJ's Wholesale Club, an American membership-only warehouse club chain
- B. J. Medical College, Pune, India
- Ben & Jerry's, an ice cream company
- Bergslagernas Järnvägar, a private railroad company of Sweden
- Toronto Blue Jays, a professional baseball team
- Booster Juice, a Canadian chain of juice and smoothie bars
- Nouvelair (IATA airline code)

== People ==
- B. J. (given name), people with the given name
- Boris Johnson (born 1964), former British prime minister
- Billy Joel, American singer-songwriter and pianist
- Brandon Johnson, 57th Mayor of Chicago

== Fictional characters ==
- B.J., a dinosaur character from the children's television program Barney & Friends
- BJ Birdie, former mascot for the Toronto Blue Jays baseball team
- B. J. Hunnicutt, a fictional doctor on the TV show M*A*S*H
- B. J. Jones, a character on the ABC soap opera General Hospital
- BJ Smith, a character in the video game Grand Theft Auto: Vice City
- B.J. Walker, a character on the American soap opera Santa Barbara
- William "B.J." Blazkowicz, the protagonist of the video game series Wolfenstein
- Billy Joe "B. J." McKay, the protagonist of the TV show B. J. and the Bear

== Places ==
- Beijing, China (Guobiao abbreviation BJ)
- Benin, WMO and ISO 2-letter country code
  - .bj, domain name ccTLD for Benin
- Burton Joyce, a village in Nottinghamshire

== Sport and competition ==
- Back Judge, an official in American football
- Beitar Jerusalem F.C., an Israeli football club
- Bj league, a Japanese professional basketball league
- Blackjack, a casino card game

== Other uses ==
- Bachelor of Journalism, an academic degree
- Bring-Jerrard form, a way to depress quintics
- Broadcast jockey, the Korean term for a streamer
- Blue Journey, VTuber music group
- Beijing (locomotive)
- Biochemical Journal
- Blow job, sexual slang for fellatio
- Ball joint, a part found in automobile suspension
- Bubble Jet, a Canon Inc. printer trademark
- Station code for Bojonegoro railway station, East Java, Indonesia
