= Gord Kirke =

Canadian lawyer (born 1945/1946)

- Born: 1945 or 1946 (age 80–81)^{[a]} Toronto, Ontario, Canada
- Education: University of Toronto (1967); Osgoode Hall Law School (1969)
- Occupations: Lawyer, professor
- Years active: 1971–present
- Known for: Toronto Blue Jays legal counsel Radio and television commentator

Gordon I. Kirke QC (born 1945/1946) is a Canadian sports and entertainment lawyer, university professor, and commentator on radio and television.

Kirke is a graduate of the Osgoode Hall Law School, and has Bachelor of Laws and Master of Laws degrees. He has been legal counsel to the Toronto Blue Jays since 1976, and prepared the original documents which led to the team's foundation. He was involved in contract negotiations in the Eric Lindros trade, and later became a player agent representing 45 National Hockey League players. Kirke teaches law at the University of Toronto Faculty of Law, and the Osgoode Hall Law School. He has published articles on law, and authored the 1997 Players First Report on sexual abuse and harassment in ice hockey. Kirke later became the first Canadian director of the Sports Lawyers Association of America, and served as its first Canadian president. He regularly appeared as a commentator on Off the Record with Michael Landsberg and on Sportsnet 590 The Fan radio with Bob McCown.

== Early life ==
Kirke grew up in Toronto, wanting to become a cowboy. His father worked in a coin-operated machine business, and his mother was a stay-at-home wife. Kirke was proficient in martial arts, and played football and baseball while in high school. Playing baseball, he lost his first base position to Peter Mahovlich. Kirke was a fan of the Toronto Maple Leafs as a youth.

Kirke graduated from the University of Toronto in 1967 with a Bachelor of Arts in literature and languages. Kirke earned a Bachelor of Laws from Osgoode Hall Law School in 1969, was called to the bar in Ontario in 1971, and earned a Master of Laws from Osgoode Hall Law School in 1977. In 1985, he was called to the bar in Alberta and made a Canadian Queen's Counsel. Kirke was given an honorary Juris Doctor from the International Bar Association in 1992.

== Legal career ==
=== 1971 to 2000 ===
Kirke began his legal career in 1971, as a litigation lawyer with Goodman & Goodman. He was introduced to sports and entertainment law, working under Herb Solway who had ties to the Labatt Brewing Company, which was active in 1977 Major League Baseball expansion discussions. Kirke prepared the original documents which led to the foundation of the Toronto Blue Jays in 1976. He remained as legal counsel and negotiated player contracts on behalf of the team. When he negotiated a contract for Doyle Alexander, the team refused to pay Alexander if he injured himself while hunting. Kirke worked out a compromise where Alexander would collect money while hurt, "only if he was following all hunting regulations and wearing an orange hunting jacket". Other notable contracts Kirke worked on include Joe Carter, Roberto Alomar, Carlos Delgado and Roger Clemens.

Kirke began a teaching career as a professor of sports law at the University of Toronto Faculty of Law in 1985, and has taught the Bachelor of Laws and Master of Laws courses at the Osgoode Hall Law School since 1987. He has also been a guest lecturer at other schools in Canada and the United States, and has been published in journals and authored legal articles.

In 1991, Kirke became an advisor to Eric Lindros after Lindros was chosen first overall in the 1991 NHL entry draft. Kirke was involved in negotiating the player's lucrative contract after the Eric Lindros trade to the Philadelphia Flyers. Kirke later stated about the incident that, "There were all kinds of allegations of Eric being anti-Quebec. But I knew it to be absolutely false. It had more to do with the management of the team".

Kirke was commissioned by the Canadian Hockey League to report on sexual abuse and harassment in 1997, and published his findings in the Players First Report. His research included interviews with teachers, social workers, psychiatrists, police, and prison inmates. Kirke stated, "I was surprised at how prevalent this is in society. And the second surprise is how little we know or want to know about it. It's a yucky subject". The report was later used as a guideline for conduct in minor ice hockey.

In the year 2000, Kirke was a managing partner in Sportsco International Corporation led by Pat Gillick, which submitted the highest bid in a court-supervised auction, to purchase the SkyDome where the Toronto Blue Jays played.

=== 2001 to present ===
In 2001, Kirke co-founded KSR Sports Representatives Incorporated, and began working as an agent for professional athletes. He described his work by saying, "as a player agent, you touch on almost every discipline or area of law you can think of: contracts, anti-trust, judicial reviews, arbitration/mediation, dissemination, immigration, tax laws, criminal — you name it". Through KSR, he represented 45 National Hockey League (NHL) players, of whom Lindros was the first. Kirke later represented Mike Modano and Rick Nash. The contract which Kirke negotiated on behalf of Nash in 2002, was the most lucrative contract for an NHL rookie at the time, valued at US$1.2 million per season plus bonuses and incentives from 8 to 12 million. Kirke let his license as a player lapse in 2005.

Kirke later established his own barrister and solicitor practice in Toronto. He became the first Canadian director of the Sports Lawyers Association of America, and later served as its first Canadian president. He represented the Toronto Blue Jays in the 2007 George J. Mitchell investigation into performance-enhancing substances in baseball.

In 2008, Kirke joined Global Resolutions, which specializes in arbitration and mediation. He represented the Toronto Maple Leafs in recruiting a new president and general manager, and the signing of Brian Burke to fill the role. Also in 2008, Kirke helped mediate negotiations between the Canadian Broadcasting Corporation (CBC) and Copyright Music & Visuals regarding The Hockey Theme, a theme song used during Hockey Night in Canada since 1968, composed by Dolores Claman.

Kirke has regularly appeared in media as a commentator on Off the Record with Michael Landsberg on The Sports Network, and Sportsnet 590 The Fan radio with Bob McCown. Kirke is a frequent guest on television and radio networks which include ESPN, NBC, CBC Sports, CTV Television Network, SCORE, and Sportsnet. He served on the board of directors for the 95th Grey Cup, and has a recurring role as the chairman of the Memorial Cup site selection committee.

=== Notable clientele ===
Kirke has also acted as legal counsel to professional and amateur athletes in other sports besides hockey and baseball. Notable clients include professional wrestler Bret Hart, and race car driver Kat Teasdale. He also represented Olympic athletes Donovan Bailey, Elfi Schlegel, and Tara Teigan. When Hart was suggested as a client, Kirke said "I sat down to get this over with and say I didn't want to represent him but he totally won me over. He was a very warm individual and he showed me poetry he wrote". Kirke then agreed to be his lawyer and they became good friends.

Kirke has been legal counsel to sports businesspeople including, Gord Ash, Paul Beeston, John Bitove, Ken Derrett, Rick Dudley, Pat Gillick, Chris Overholt, Richard Peddie, Keith Pelley, and Tom Wright. Kirke also represented teams including the Toronto Raptors, Toronto Argonauts, and Indianapolis Colts; and sports groups including the Canadian Hockey League, Ontario Hockey League, and World Wrestling Federation.

== Reputation ==
Kirke has been referred to as one of Canada's top sports lawyers by The Globe and Mail, Hockey Canada and York University. The Canadian Lawyer Magazine said that Kirke was "Canada’s sports lawyer extraordinaire". He was listed number 21 on the "Top 25 in Canadian sports" in 2000 by The Globe and Mail, and appeared on the same list three times total.

Pat Gillick from the Blue Jays said of Kirke that, "his style kind of stood out a little bit. Gordie has kind of a low-key style, so he puts pressure on people without the people knowing that pressure had been put on them". Canadian radio personality Bob McCown observed of Kirke, "You are in the ego business. You’re dealing with enormous egos. He has no mood swings I am aware of. He's always light-hearted and joking and never makes anything out to be World War Three. With him it never gets personal. But you always feel he is not your enemy, even on the other side of the table. And that is clearly his greatest asset".

== Personal life ==
Kirke was married with two children, and resided in Rosedale, Toronto, as of 2006. He has served as a volunteer director for charitable organizations including, the Canadian Centre for Ethics in Sports, Children's Aid Society, Easter Seals, Prostate Cancer Canada, Scarborough Distress Centre, Scarborough Health Network, Special Olympics, and Tennis Canada. He also went to Kandahar with the Canada men's national ice hockey team to provide entertainment to Canadian soldiers in Afghanistan.

== Notes ==
- ^{a} Kirke was reported to be 60 years old as of January 25, 2006.
