= Allan Leibel =

Canadian sailor

- Born: 28 February 1945 (age 81)
- Education: University of Toronto (B.Comm, 1967); University of Toronto Faculty of Law (LL.B., 1970)
- Occupation: Lawyer
- Known for: Olympic Sailor

Allan Leibel (born 28 February 1945) is a former Canadian sailor who competed in the 1972 Summer Olympics and the 1976 Summer Olympics. Leibel presently serves as a member of the Canadian Olympic Association and as a member of the International Sailing Federation Review Board.

Leibel attended the University of Toronto, earning a B.Comm degree in 1967 and an LL.B. degree in 1970. In 1972, he joined the Toronto law firm Goodmans, where he served as co-chair and continues to serve as counsel. Leibel focuses on municipal law and is a noted authority on development matters in the Toronto area. He was part of the team that drew up plans for the creation of the "Mega City" during the 1998 Amalgamation of Toronto.
