= Dale Lastman =

Canadian lawyer

Dale Lastman CM OOnt
- Born: Dale Howard Lastman; 19 March 1957 (age 69)
- Education: University of Toronto (B.A); Osgoode Hall Law School (J.D.)
- Occupations: Lawyer, professor
- Known for: Chair of Goodmans
- Parent(s): Mel Lastman; Marilyn Bornstein
- Relatives: Blayne Lastman (brother)

Dale Howard Lastman CM OOnt (born 19 March 1957) is a Canadian lawyer who serves as Chair of Goodmans law firm. He is the elder son of the late Mel Lastman, who was Mayor of Toronto from 1998 to 2003.

== Career and community involvement ==
Lastman practices corporate, commercial and securities law with Goodmans. He has held leadership and governance roles in professional sports, including as a Director of Maple Leaf Sports & Entertainment.

Lastman served as Chair of Baycrest Health Sciences Baycrest.

Lastman is a distinguished Member of the Order of Canada and the Order of Ontario. Lastman was listed among Toronto Life's "50 Most Influential People".
