= Goodmans =

Canadian corporate law firm

Goodmans LLP
- Headquarters: Bay Adelaide Centre; Toronto, Ontario, Canada
- No. of offices: 1
- No. of lawyers: 200+
- Major practice areas: Mergers and acquisitions, litigation, corporate restructuring, private equity, corporate finance and securities, mining and natural resources, banking, commercial real estate, entertainment, tax and intellectual property, among others
- Key people: Dale Lastman (chairman)
- Date founded: 1917
- Founder: David Bertram Goodman
- Company type: Limited liability partnership
- Website: www.goodmans.ca

Goodmans LLP is a Canadian corporate law firm. First established in Toronto in 1917 by David Bertram Goodman, Goodmans LLP now has approximately 200 lawyers. The firm acts for Canada's largest corporations, financial institutions and multinationals, and was recognized two years in a row as the National Law Firm of the Year for Canada at the International Financial Law Review's Americas Awards. In September 2018, Goodmans was awarded the Americas Energy Tax Deal of the Year at the 13th annual Americas Tax Awards by International Tax Review in New York City.

== Notable firm members and alumni ==
- Edwin A. Goodman – One of the founding partners: Canadian lawyer and political figure
- Mike Harris – Former advisor: MPP and 22nd Premier of Ontario (1995–2002)
- Gord Kirke – Counsel and later sports and entertainment lawyer
- Dale Lastman – Current chair of Goodmans
- Allan Leibel – Counsel and former co-chair: Canadian Olympic sailor
- David Matlow - Partner, former Chair Jewish Foundation of Greater Toronto, Chair of the Ontario Jewish Archives, member of the Board of Directors of the Centre for Israel Education and the National Marketing Committee of State of Israel Bonds (Canada), and vocal proponent for Zionism
- Bob Rae – Former partner: Member of Parliament, Leader of the Liberal Party of Canada (2011–13) and 21st Premier of Ontario (1990–1995)
- Herb Solway – Former chair of the firm: Chairman of the Toronto Blue Jays
