= Bijay Biswaal =

Indian painter

Bijayananda Biswaal
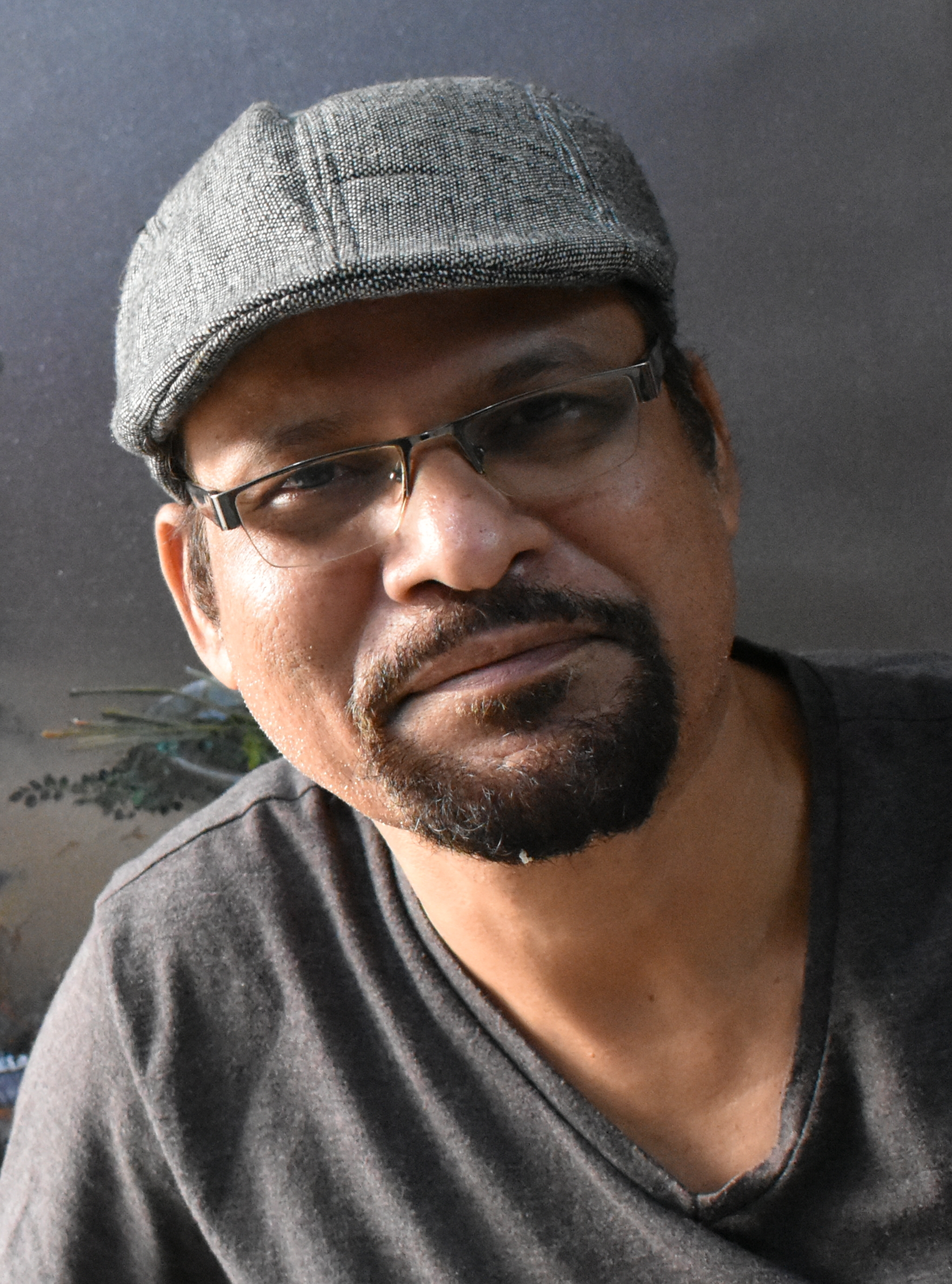
- Born: 16 May 1964 (age 62); Pallahara, Angul, Odisha
- Occupation: Painter
- Website: https://www.biswaal.in/

Bijayananda Biswaal better known as Bijay Biswaal is an Indian painter and artist. He worked as a Chief Ticket Inspector at Indian Railways at Nagpur. He voluntarily retired from Indian Railways to continue painting.

== Early life ==
Bijay was born at Pallahara in the Angul district of the Indian state of Odisha.

== Work ==
Bijay Biswaal's work is based mainly on Indian railways and themed mainly on the rural life of India. His other works consist of detailed and exquisite pen art which remains surreal for the eyes of the viewers.

== Awards ==
Biswaal was felicitated by the Government of Odisha for his painting works. He also got a special mention in the show Mann Ki Baat by Narendra Modi for his paintings.
