= Herb Solway =

Herbert Solway, K.C.
- Education: University of Toronto (B.A); University of Toronto Faculty of Law (J.D.)
- Occupation: Lawyer
- Known for: Chair of the Toronto Blue Jays

Herb Solway, KC is a founding member of the Toronto law firm Goodmans. Herb joined the firm in 1955 and served as its chair from 1982 to 1994. For five decades he was the linchpin in building the firm through a highly successful student recruitment program.

Herb has been closely involved with the Toronto Blue Jays since their inception in 1977. He advised beer company Labatts throughout the founding of the franchise, and served as a Jays director, and as Chair. According to the National Post, the Toronto Blue Jays would not have existed without the significant efforts of Herb Solway.

Solway has in past held directorships with Gluskin Sheff, Sun Media, Labatt Brewing Company, the Centre for Addiction and Mental Health and the Tarragon Theatre.

In 2017, he was honoured with the University of Toronto Faculty of Law’s Distinguished Alumni Award, for lifetime public leadership and community achievement.

A lifelong Torontonian, Herb is the son of the late Fanny (née Schwartz) and Alex Solway. Herb is married to the author Ann Shortell. He has four children, six grandchildren, and one great-grandchild.
