= Barbara "BJ" Gallagher Hateley =

American writer

Barbara "BJ" Gallagher Hateley (born 1949) is an author and speaker who lives in Los Angeles, California. She writes business books, women's books, gift books, and children's books.

== Biography ==
Hateley is a Phi Beta Kappa graduate of the University of Southern California, earning summa cum laude honors with her BA in sociology. She has completed the coursework for a PhD in social ethics, also at USC.

Hateley is the former manager of training and development for the Los Angeles Times, where she was responsible for management development, sales training, customer service seminars, diversity training, specialized programs for women, and the development of high potential managers.

Hateley and her books have been featured on CBS Evening News with Bob Schieffer, the Today Show with Matt Lauer, Fox News, PBS, CNN, and other television and radio programs. She is quoted almost weekly in various newspapers, women's magazines, and websites, including: O: The Oprah Magazine, Redbook, Woman's World, Ladies Home Journal, First for Women, The New York Times, Chicago Tribune, the Wall Street Journal, The Christian Science Monitor, Orlando Sentinel, Financial Times (U.K.), the Guardian (U.K.), CareerBuilder.com, MSNBC.com, ClubMom.com, SavvyMiss.com, CNN.com, among others.

In addition to writing books, Hateley also conducts seminars and delivers keynotes at conferences and professional meetings across the country. Her corporate clients include: IBM, Chevron, US Veteran's Administration, John Deere Credit Canada, Volkswagen, Farm Credit Services of America, Raytheon, US Department of Interior, Phoenix Newspapers Inc., the American Press Institute, Infiniti, Nissan, Atlanta Journal-Constitution, among others.

BJ Gallagher went back to her maiden name (Gallagher) in 2002, so most of her 30+ books are under that name, including an international best-seller, A Peacock in the Land of Penguins (Berrett-Koehler; 20th anniversary edition 2015), now published in 23 languages worldwide, with over 400,000 copies sold.

== Selected works ==
- Why Don't I Do the Things I Know are Good for Me? (Berkley; 2009)
- t's Never Too Late to Be What You Might Have Been (Viva Editions; 2009)
- Learning to Dance in the Rain (Simple Truths; 2009)
- The Best Way Out is Always Through (Simple Truths; 2009)
- The World's Best Advice from the World's Wisest Women (Insight Editions; 2009)
- YES Lives in the Land of NO (Berrett-Koehler; 2006)
- Who Are 'They' Anyway? (Dearborn; 2004)
- Everything I Need to Know I Learned from Other Women (Conari; 2002)
- Being Buddha at Work (Berrett-Koehler; 2015)
- Witty Words from Wise Women (Andrews McMeel; 2001)
- The Leadership Secrets of Oz (Simple Truths)
- Your Life Is Your Prayer (Mango Publishing; 2019)

== Publications ==
- A Peacock in the Land of Penguins: A Fable about Creativity and Courage, 20th Anniversary Edition (with Warren H. Schmidt, 2015), Berrett-Koehler Publishers; ISBN 9781626562431.
- Being Buddha at Work: 108 Ancient Truths on Change, Stress, Money, and Success (with Franz Metcalf, 2012), Berrett-Koehler Publishers; ISBN 9781609942922.
- Yes Lives in the Land of No: A Tale of Triumph over Negativity (with Steve Ventura, 2006), Berrett-Koehler Publishers; ISBN 9781576753392.
