= Toronto Blue Jays mascots =

Mascots of the Canadian professional baseball team

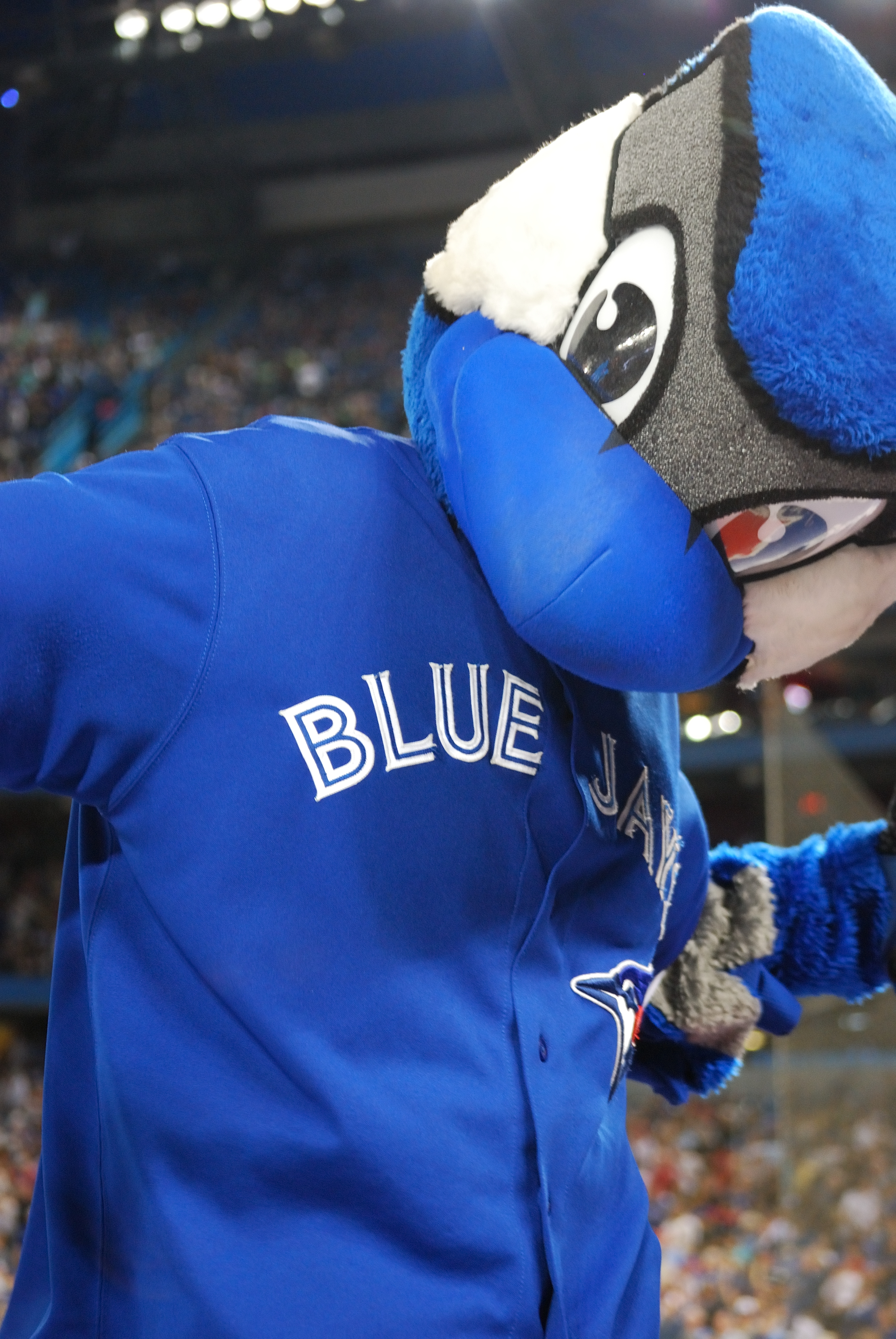
Ace at the Rogers Centre during the 2013 season.

Over the years, the Toronto Blue Jays have created three full-time mascots, all of which portray the bird for which the team was named.

BJ Birdy was the team mascot from 1979 to 1999. For the 2000 season, BJ was replaced by Ace and Diamond, two new characters. Diamond was dropped at the end of the 2003 season, leaving Ace the sole mascot. In recent years, Ace has been joined on an occasional basis by Junior. This happens on "Junior Jays Sundays", formerly "Junior Jays Saturdays".

BJ Birdy and Diamond returned in 2026 for the team's fiftieth season, alongside Domer, appearing Sundays. BJ Birdy was revived without copyright permission from his creator Kevin Shanahan, who maintained full ownership of the character during and after its run.

== Eras ==
=== BJ Birdy (1979–1999) ===
==== Early years (1979–1984) ====
Kevin Shanahan was an employee of Ontario Place, a theme park attraction run by the provincial government of Ontario, located on Toronto's lakeshore across from municipally-run Exhibition Place, site of Exhibition Stadium, the team's home field at the time. As a University of Toronto student, Shanahan designed and performed in a moose costume at the park, to replace the more "motley-looking thing" they already had. (Note: The new moose cost $700 to make, whereas the Jay cost $250 to $300, "because this time I knew what I was doing." (Patton, "Big Jay flaps for win".)) The second moose costume was uncomfortable, so he designed a more comfortable bird costume. A friend suggested to him the Blue Jays might want a mascot. Not a baseball fan, he had never seen a live game. He commented "it didn't take me long to see why a mascot was needed. The game needs a distraction. Otherwise your mind wanders." Shanahan was a part-time science student, before he later dropped out. Previously he had attended Michael Power High school, where he drew comics for the school newspaper.

The team was working on a deal with CHUM Limited to develop a mascot character, after the Montreal Expos had added the character of Youppi! earlier in the year. (Note: The Expos' final season in Montreal was 2004. The team moved to Washington, D.C., and the rights to Youppi! were sold to the Montreal Canadiens. (Rubin, Mike (September 1996). "The Round and the Fury". SPIN. Palm Coast, FL: Camouflage Associates: 142.))

Mascots are fuzzy animals hired to keep people happy—young people especially—who aren't fascinated by all the statistics we pour at them, or who just get distracted by the time they reach the sixth or seventh innings.

— Kevin Shanahan, 1998

In 1985, the BJ Birdy character was described as "lovable, irascible, curious, impudent, mischievous, and often the victim of his own impulsiveness." Much of the routines were improvised. "B.J. is a reaction character. He's a fan. He wants to know what's going on. He'll duck behind a dugout and then pop up again. He does what a lot of fans would do if they weren't so reserved." The costume had "perfect vision", and was said to be quite agile.

During the 1981 Major League Baseball strike, 22-year-old Shanahan told the Star that he would lose $7000 if the whole season was cancelled. (Note: This was listed as being $110 a home game, plus licensing fees and outside appearances.) He suggested he might return to Ontario Place, but worried the strike might permanently kill the character. During the strike, he rebuilt his Basil Beaver and Mickey Moose costume heads for Ontario Place, and received a contract to build six more animals in the autumn. By the end of the strike, he estimated a loss of $3600.

The Globe and Mail reported a rumour that Shanahan would not be offered a new contract for 1986.

The character and its actor had a continuously strained relationship with the team and some fans. When receiving complaints from the fans or media on his behavior at a game, the team front office would apparently reply "B.J. Who?" In 1985, he commented: "I'm always walking a fine wire. I found out early that Blue Jays won't back me up, that I'm on my own. So I'm on a balancing act." (Note: In the book Yes, It's Hot in Here: Adventures in the Weird, Woolly World of Sports Mascots (2014), former Mr. Met A.J. Mass noted that Shanahan would regularly verbally answer the questions of the public, contrary to standard procedure for mascots. As it set precedent, it would make other performers look inaccurately standoffish in comparison. (Mass, A. J. (April 15, 2014). Yes, It's Hot in Here: Adventures in the Weird, Woolly World of Sports Mascots. Rodale. pp. 60–61. ISBN 978-1623360047.))

==== Comic strip (1985–1988) ====
On April 1, 1985, the first BJ Birdy comic ran in the Toronto Star, created by Shanahan. In a preview article, he commented on the character: "I see him as an underbird but he'll definitely be his own bird. He'll get the odd quip in his favor, he'll second-guess like fans do but, most of the time, everything will fall back on him. Of course, he might develop into something totally different. I have ideas but that isn't to say they and B.J. won't change. Situations that B.J. got into at the stadium were limited but this way the sky's the limit. He can fall off stadiums, go through walls, do silly, little things. There's total freedom." The character often criticized Jays management. The Globe noted that fans "had grown abusive. Broadcasters question the reason for his existence. The team's front office offers only middling support." The newspaper noted a negative bent to the comic, with many strips taking shots at those groups. When Paul Beeston was asked about his opinion on a strip centering on him, vice president he commented "What comic strip? I didn't know he had one." In another strip, BJ Birdy's mother is about to hit mascot-hating broadcaster Tony Kubek on the head. He commented that the strip was based on real situations, "when I distort something, I only tone it down."

The comic ran in the sports section of the Toronto Star (during baseball season only) for about three and a half years; later strips were presented under the title BJ Birdy's Bush League. Despite — or perhaps because of — its occasionally controversial nature, the comic was not especially successful, and wound down at the conclusion of the 1988 season.

==== The SkyDome years (1989–1999, 2026) ====
On the move to SkyDome, "BJ Birdy" told the Star that the team should keep prices as is.

BJ Birdy gained wider notoriety on May 22, 1993, when he was ejected from a Blue Jays game against the Minnesota Twins for trying to influence an umpire's call on a caught line drive. In the bottom of the first inning, umpire Jim McKean ruled that Twins infielder David McCarty didn't catch a line drive hit by Roberto Alomar, ruling the play a hit. Although the ruling favoured his team, BJ Birdy was caught up in the excitement of the play and attempted to get the crowd to make the "hit" ruling just as McKean was actually making the ruling. McKean still took exception to the antic, ejecting BJ Birdy from the game, which the Jays still won 7–0.

Over the character's final seasons, Shanahan suggested that Jays management turned down multiple appearance requests for BJ Birdy. The Raptor, mascot of the Toronto Raptors basketball team, was meanwhile gaining acclaim for his acrobatic routines. The Jays noted the admiration for the NBA team's "total entertainment package". The team had its second lowest opening day attendance in 1999, desperately trying to attract audiences. The Star commented that the team's desperation was evident, suggesting that "the nadir probably reached when a van circled the field pulling a flatbed which bore B.J. Birdy, a massive plastic rodent, two dancing bears and a man firing T-shirts into the stands with a bazooka." Shanahan retained ownership of the character, despite initial attempts to sell the rights and costume to the club.

Shanahan was called into a meeting with the senior vice-president of marketing for the Toronto Blue Jays, Terry Zuk; the two apparently had not met before. He was told he was being replaced by two new mascots. Shanahan again offered to sell the costume and copyrights, but the club declined. The team suggested, if it were too hard to hold onto the costume, the Jays Care Foundation would gladly accept a donation; he flatly refused. It was also suggested Shanahan might be interested in training the new performers. Seeking legal advice, he informed the club the new mascots could not debut before his contract expired on December 31, well after the season's end. In response, the club called him at his home in Mississauga, telling him not to appear at the final two regular season home games; he would quip to the media that they were the first "two paid days off after 20 years."

In early December, the story about BJ Birdy's two replacements made the news. Shanahan commented that "there's not a great deal of pain in this. I had a good run. But it bothers me that the Jays talked about it before my contract was up. They gave their word they'd wait until December 31." General Manager Gord Ash contested that "there was no intent to reveal that. We were confronted with the story, it was out from another source and there was no sense having a bunker mentality and denying it."

BJ Birdy returned for Sunday games in April 2026, appearing with Diamond and SkyDome mascot Domer, as part of the team's fiftieth anniversary. He also appeared at at least one weekday game. It wasn't until CBC News reporter Haydn Watters contacted Shanahan for comment that he, as the copyright holder, was aware of the reboot. The new costume was created without permission. As of early May 2026, Shanahan still hadn't heard from the team, and Toronto Star didn't receive a response to their request for comment.

=== Ace (2000–present) and Diamond (2000–2003, 2026) ===
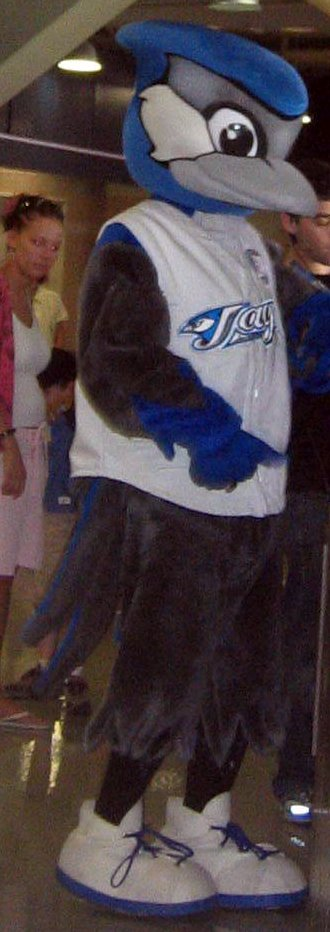
Ace appears at Rogers Centre in 2006.

Quickly, some in the sports media asked "Double the pleasure? Or, double the pain?" News of a naming contest led to suggestions like Swing and A Miss, More and Annoying, and Bird and Brain. For their part, the Globe issued an editorial calling the situation "a baseball civics lesson", suggesting that no one asked the public, "and when you don't ask citizens of a democracy if they want an icon to be changed you must expect them to rise up in revolution... or at least cry out: Give us back our bird."

As of early December 1999, four people expressed interest in applying, three of them from the United States. By the first round of auditions on January 10, 2000, the club had received about 70 applications.

The characters themselves were conceived and designed by Kelly Giannopoulos and Diane Semark. "We looked for the most interesting personality traits and then actually gave the mascots a past, a sort of legend that went with their story." The duo were designed with distinct plumage and faces, to reflect their gender. Sugar's Costume Studio built the outfits based on their designs. Their personality traits were modelled after Jim Carrey and Goldie Hawn, because "both of them have a wild and zany side." (Note: Ironically, in a 1996 article, the Raptors performer listed Carrey and Charlie Chaplin as his inspirations.) Their original names were Slider and Curveball. On March 4, 2000, two new names were unveiled through the Toronto Blue Jays "Name the Mascots Contest" ACE and DIAMOND. Winner of contest: Toronto High School Student A. McConnell.

The costumes were built by Sugar's Mascot Costumes in Toronto. An early article suggested they would wear varied clothes; "tuxedos for formal events and surgical garb for hospital visits." The new costumes were lightweight and featured athletic pants to allow for stunts.

Brennan Anderson played Ace for five years, bringing his competitive gymnastics and media background. He later became a sales manager at Sugar's. Diamond performers included then-Ryerson University student Angelina Milanovic, University of Toronto musical theatre student Larissa Bathgate, and Amanda Barker.

Ace became sole mascot of the Blue Jays in 2004, after the team removed Diamond before the season opened. She returned in 2026, for Sunday games during the team's 50th season. Ace's jersey number is double zero.

A second blue jay mascot, named Junior, is present on "Junior Jays days", usually Saturdays home games, when children are invited to run the bases after the games. Junior's number is 1/2 (half).

Affiliate team the Dunedin Blue Jays are represented by DJay the Blue Jay; he was named BJ in 1998.

Ace's official website jokingly mentioned that his father invented bird stickers commonly found on windows and his mother was a goose feather supplier.

In 2012, Ace underwent some changes when the team changed their logo and uniforms. Ace was given more fur and his beak was changed from gray to blue and the bottom of his legs were switched from black to gray. This also happened to Junior.

== See also ==
- List of Major League Baseball mascots
